= Commodore Commanding Submarines (East) =

- Pennant of the COMCOS (E) (Commodore's pennant)
- Incumbent; Commodore H. S. Kelkar since 2024
- Indian Navy
- Abbreviation: COMCOS (E)
- Reports to: Flag Officer Commanding-in-Chief Eastern Naval Command
- Seat: Visakhapatnam, Andhra Pradesh
- Formation: 1988
- First holder: Captain V. S. Vishnoi, NM (as COMSUB)

The Commodore Commanding Submarines (East) is an operational appointment in the Indian Navy. The COMCOS (E) is the commander of the all submarines and allied units of Eastern Naval Command. Based in Visakhapatnam, Andhra Pradesh, the COMCOS is also the commanding officer of the submarine base INS Virbahu. Currently, there are two COMCOS in the Indian Navy, COMCOS (East) and COMCOS (West). The COMCOS (E) is a one star officer holding the rank of Commodore. The current COMCOS (E) is Commodore H. S. Kelkar.

== History ==
The submarine arm of the Indian Navy was formed with the commissioning of INS Kalvari (S23) in December 1967. Three other submarines – Khanderi, Karanj and Kursura were acquired from the Soviet Union and the 8th Submarine squadron was formed. The submarine base INS Virbahu was commissioned on 19 May 1971 as the shore support base for submarines. The Commanding Officer of Virbahu functioned as the Captain of the submarine squadron and the class Authority for all submarines.

In the early 1970s, four Vela-class submarines were acquired. The submarines, INS Vela (S40), INS Vagir (S41), INS Vagli (S42) and INS Vagsheer (S43) were commissioned between 1973 and 1974. With this, the 9th submarine squadron was formed and was based on the west coast, in Mumbai. In the 1980s, the Sindhughosh-class submarines - INS Sindhughosh (S55), INS Sindhudhvaj (S56), INS Sindhuraj (S57) and INS Sindhuvir (S58) were commissioned. They constituted the 11th submarine squadron. In 1986, two Shishumar-class submarines INS Shishumar (S44) and INS Shankush (S45) were inducted, forming the 10th submarine squadron. Four more Sindhughosh-class submarines were to be commissioned constituting the 12th submarine squadron.

Since multiple submarine squadrons (SS) had been formed - the 8th and 11th SS in Visakhapatnam and 9th, 10th and 12th SS in Mumbai, the need to group them on each coast was felt. In April 1988, the post of Commodore Submarines East (COMSUB (E)) was created. The COMSUB (E) also commanded the submarine base INS Virbahu, apart from the submarine squadrons. In December 1996, the appointment of COMSUB was re-designated Commodore Commanding Submarines (COMCOS).

== Organisation ==
Today, under the COMCOS (E) are INS Virbahu, the 11th submarine squadron and the 14th submarine squadron, the Submarine Maintenance Unit, the NRW and the SSS. The COMCOS (E) is also the commanding officer of INS Virbahu.

== List of COMCOS ==
S.No.	Name	Assumed office	Left office	Notes
CO INS Virbahu & Commodore Submarines (East)
1	Commodore V. S. Vishnoi NM	1 April 1988 (Note: Appointed as a captain, promoted to the rank of commodore on 1 July 1989.)	19 September 1989	First COMSUB (E).
2	Captain Arun Kumar Singh NM	20 September 1989	10 March 1992	Later served as Director General of the Indian Coast Guard, Commander-in-Chief, Andaman and Nicobar Command and Flag Officer Commanding-in-Chief Eastern Naval Command.
3	Captain V. Kumar	11 March 1992	24 December 1993	
4	Commander D. V. Pandit	25 December 1993	11 April 1994	
5	Captain P. Kumar NM	12 April 1994	22 June 1995	
6	Captain Arun Kumar NM	23 June 1995	30 December 1996	
CO INS Virbahu & Commodore Commanding Submarines (East)
7	Captain A. S. Bhatyal NM	16 June 1997	9 December 1999	
8	Captain G. S. Randhawa	10 December 1999	16 April 2001	
9	Captain S. Govind	17 April 2001	29 September 2002	
10	Commodore S. H. Subramanian	30 September 2002 (Note: Appointed as a captain, promoted to the rank of commodore on 13 July 2004.)	21 February 2005	
11	Commodore C. P. Srivastava	22 February 2005 (Note: Appointed as a captain, promoted to the rank of commodore on 14 March 2005.)	30 April 2006	
12	Commodore Sunil Jetly	1 May 2006	18 December 2007	Later served as Naval Officer-in-charge (NOIC) Vizag.
13	Commodore Aspi Cawasji NM	19 December 2007	26 January 2009	
14	Commodore Rajesh Sarin NM	27 January 2009	2 May 2010	
15	Commodore S. R. Kapoor	3 May 2010 (Note: Appointed as a captain, promoted to the rank of commodore on 1 July 2011.)	17 July 2012	Also served as the Commodore Commanding Submarines (West).
16	Commodore Dilbagh Singh	18 July 2012	5 May 2013	
17	Commodore P. Ashokan NM	6 May 2013	3 July 2014	Also commanded the nuclear submarine INS Chakra.
18	Commodore Anshuman Dutt	4 July 2014	29 February 2016	
19	Commodore V. R. Peshwae VSM	1 March 2016	15 January 2019	
20	Commodore A. Y. Sardesai	16 January 2019	19 February 2020	Later Flag Officer Submarines (FOSM).
21	Commodore K. Venkatraman VSM	20 February 2020	31 March 2023	Current Flag Officer Submarines (FOSM).
22	Commodore Chetan Chandegave	1 April 2023	29 October 2023	
23	Commodore L. M. Fernandes	29 October 2023	14 October 2024	
24	Commodore H. S. Kelkar	14 October 2024	Present	Current CO INS Virbahu & COMCOS (E).

== See also ==
- Flag Officer Submarines
- Commodore Commanding Submarines (West)

== Bibliography ==
- Singh, Satyindra (1991), Blueprint to bluewater: The Indian Navy, 1951-65, Lancer International, ISBN 978-8170621485
- Hiranandani, G M (2005), Transition to eminence : the Indian navy 1976-1990, Lancer Publishers, ISBN 978-8170622666
- Hiranandani, G. M. (2010), Transition to Guardianship: The Indian Navy 1991-2000, Lancer InterConsult, Incorporated, ISBN 978-1935501268
- Singh, Anup (2018), Blue Waters Ahoy!: The Indian Navy 2001-2010, HarperCollins Publishers India, ISBN 978-9353025526
