= Commodore Commanding Submarines (West) =

- Pennant of the COMCOS (W) (Commodore's pennant)
- Incumbent; Commodore Sumeet Singh Sodhi
- Indian Navy
- Abbreviation: COMCOS (W)
- Reports to: Flag Officer Commanding-in-Chief Western Naval Command
- Seat: Mumbai, Maharashtra
- Formation: 1987

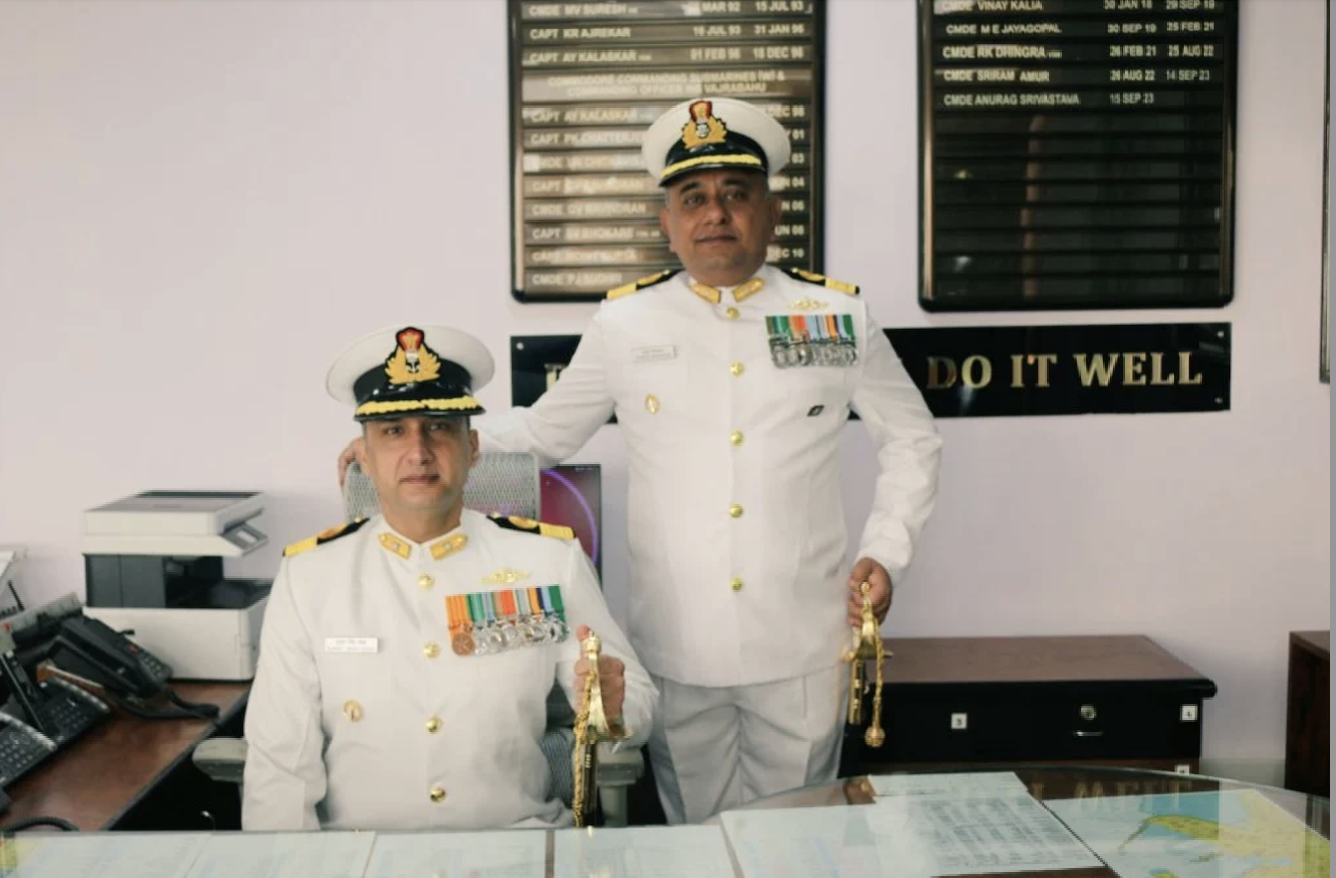
Cmde Anurag Shrivastav passing the COMCOS (W) baton to Cmde Sumeet Sodhi

The Commodore Commanding Submarines (West) is an operational appointment in the Indian Navy. The COMCOS (W) is the commander of the all submarines and allied units of Western Naval Command. Based in Mumbai, Maharashtra, the COMCOS is also the commanding officer of the submarine base INS Vajrabahu. Currently, there are two COMCOS in the Indian Navy, COMCOS (East) and COMCOS (West). The COMCOS (W) is a one star officer holding the rank of Commodore. The current COMCOS (W) is Commodore Sumeet Singh Sodhi.

== History ==
The submarine arm of the Indian Navy was formed with the commissioning of INS Kalvari (S23) in December 1967. Three other submarines – Khanderi, Karanj and Kursura were acquired from the Soviet Union and the 8th Submarine squadron was formed. The submarine base INS Virbahu was commissioned on 19 May 1971 as the shore support base for submarines. The Commanding Officer of Virbahu functioned as the Captain of the submarine squadron and the class Authority for all submarines.

In the early 1970s, four Vela-class submarines were acquired. The submarines, INS Vela (S40), INS Vagir (S41), INS Vagli (S42) and INS Vagsheer (S43) were commissioned between 1973 and 1974. With this, the 9th submarine squadron was formed and was based on the west coast, in Mumbai. In the 1980s, the Sindhughosh-class submarines - INS Sindhughosh (S55), INS Sindhudhvaj (S56), INS Sindhuraj (S57) and INS Sindhuvir (S58) were commissioned. They constituted the 11th submarine squadron. In 1986, two Shishumar-class submarines INS Shishumar (S44) and INS Shankush (S45) were inducted, forming the 10th submarine squadron. Four more Sindhughosh-class submarines were to be commissioned constituting the 12th submarine squadron.

Since multiple submarine squadrons (SS) had been formed - the 8th and 11th SS in Visakhapatnam and 9th, 10th and 12th SS in Mumbai, the need to group them on each coast was felt. In April 1987, the post of Commodore Submarines West (COMSUB (W)) was created. On 1 February 1996, the submarine base on the west coast, INS Vajrabahu was commissioned in Mumbai. Later that year, the appointment of COMSUB was re-designated Commodore Commanding Submarines (COMCOS).

== Organisation ==
Currently, INS Vajrabahu, the 10th submarine squadron (Sindhughosh-class submarine) and the 12th submarine squadron (Shishumar-class submarine) come under the COMCOS(W). The COMCOS (W) is also the commanding officer of INS Vajrabahu.

== See also ==
- Flag Officer Submarines
- Commodore Commanding Submarines (East)

== Bibliography ==
- Singh, Satyindra (1991), Blueprint to bluewater: The Indian Navy, 1951-65, Lancer International, ISBN 978-8170621485
- Hiranandani, G M (2005), Transition to eminence : the Indian navy 1976-1990, Lancer Publishers, ISBN 978-8170622666
- Hiranandani, G. M. (2010), Transition to Guardianship: The Indian Navy 1991-2000, Lancer InterConsult, Incorporated, ISBN 978-1935501268
- Singh, Anup (2018), Blue Waters Ahoy!: The Indian Navy 2001-2010, HarperCollins Publishers India, ISBN 978-9353025526
