= Ravi Kumar Dhingra =

Indian Navy Admiral

Rear Admiral R. K. Dhingra VSM
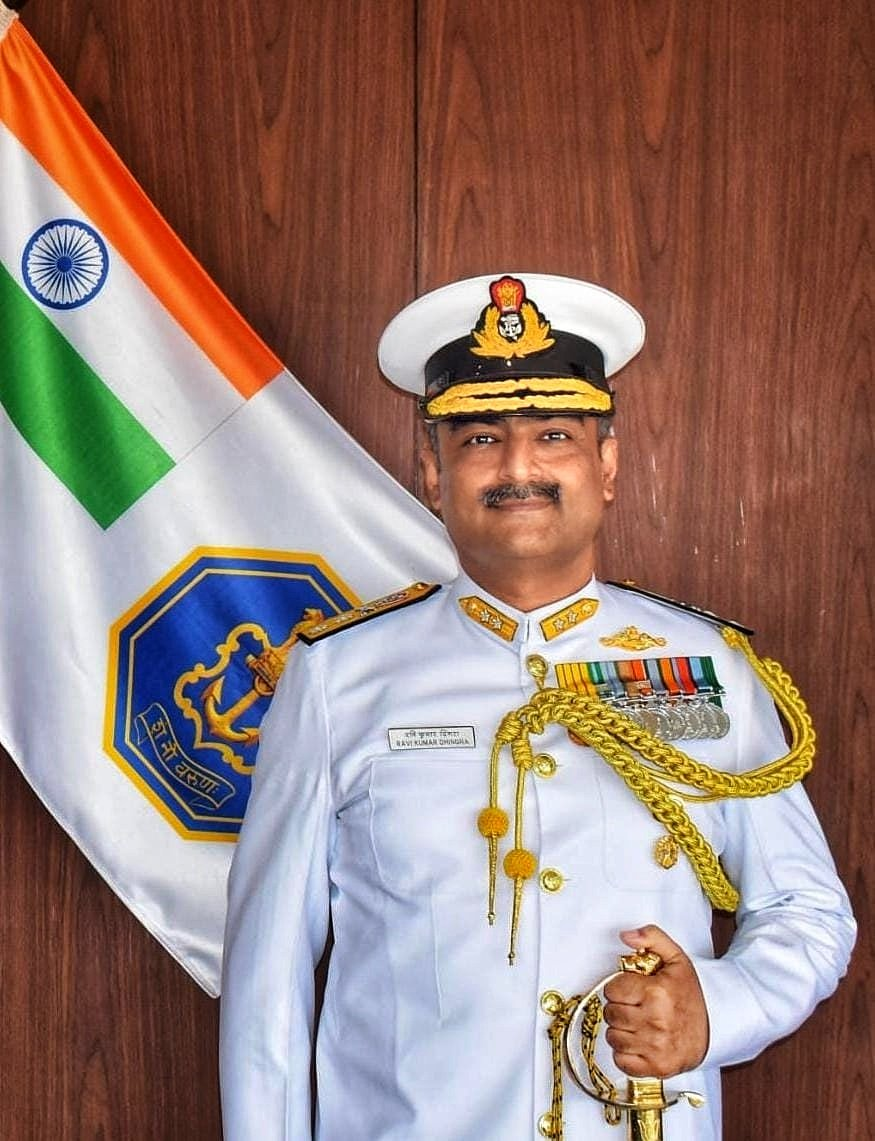
- Education: Indian Naval Academy
- Military career
- Allegiance: India
- Branch: Indian Navy
- Service years: 1992 – present
- Rank: Rear Admiral
- Commands: Tamil Nadu & Puducherry Naval Area; INS Vajrabahu; INS Gomati (F21); INS Sindhughosh (S55); INS Vagli (S42)

Rear Admiral Ravi Kumar Dhingra, VSM (born 25 July 1970) is a serving flag officer in the Indian Navy. He last served as the Flag Officer Commanding Tamil Nadu & Puducherry Naval Area. A submariner, he earlier served as the Commodore Commanding Submarines (West).

== Naval career ==
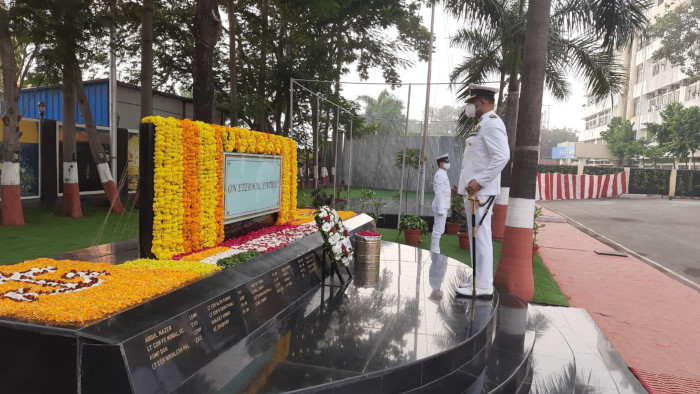
Dhingra, as COMCOS (W), laying a wreath on 54th Submarine Day at the Submarine Memorial in Mumbai.

Dhingra graduated from the National Defence Academy, Khadakwasla and was commissioned into the Indian Navy on 1 January 1992. He joined the submarine arm in 1994 and is a specialist in Navigation and Direction. After his specialisation, he served as the Navigating Officer of the Vela-class submarine INS Vagir (S41) and the Sindhughosh-class submarine INS Sindhushastra (S65).

Dhingra attended the Defence Services Staff College, Wellington. He has a Masters in Defence and Strategic Studies and an M.Phil in Strategic Studies from the University of Mumbai. In his staff appointments, Dhingra has served as Staff Officer (Operations) and Commander Submarines at the submarine base INS Vajrabahu.

Dhingra has commanded the Vela-class submarine INS Vagli (S42). He served as the executive officer of the Sindhughosh-class submarine INS Sindhuraj (S57). He subsequently commanded her sister-boat INS Sindhughosh (S55). Dhingra also commanded the Godavari-class guided missile frigate INS Gomati (F21). During his command tenure, Gomati was adjudged the 'Most Spirited Ship' of the Western Fleet in 2018. For his command of Gomati, he was awarded the Vishisht Seva Medal on 26 January 2019.

As a commodore, Dhingra was appointed Commodore Commanding Submarines (West) (COMCOS (W)). As COMCOS, he also dual-hatted as the commanding officer INS Vajrabahu and commanded the 10th submarine squadron and the 11th submarine squadron. He subsequently served as the principal director submarine operations at naval headquarters.

=== Flag rank ===
Dhingra was promoted to flag rank and was appointed Flag Officer Commanding Tamil Nadu & Puducherry Naval Area (FOTNA). As FOTNA, he is responsible for the operations and administration of all units and establishments in Tamil Nadu and Puducherry.

== Awards and decorations ==
Dhingra was awarded the Vishisht Seva Medal in 2019 and the Chief of the Naval Staff Commendation Card in 2004.

| Vishisht Seva Medal | Samanya Seva Medal | Operation Vijay Medal | Operation Parakram Medal |
| Sainya Seva Medal | 75th Independence Anniversary Medal | 50th Independence Anniversary Medal | 30 Years Long Service Medal |
| | 20 Years Long Service Medal | 9 Years Long Service Medal | |

== See also ==
- Flag Officer Commanding Tamil Nadu & Puducherry Naval Area
- Commodore Commanding Submarines (West)

Military offices
| Preceded by S. Venkat Raman | Flag Officer Commanding Tamil Nadu & Puducherry Naval Area; 2023 – 2025 | Succeeded by Satish Shenai |
