= Soviet submarine B-464 =

Soviet submarine B-464 may refer to one of the following submarines of the Soviet Navy:

- Soviet submarine B-464 (1973), a Foxtrot-class submarine; sold to India as INS Vagli (S42) of the Indian Navy's Vela class
- Soviet submarine B-464 (1991), a Kilo-class submarine; an active submarine in the Russian Navy
