= Soviet submarine B-470 =

Soviet submarine B-470 may refer to one of the following submarines of the Soviet Navy:

- Soviet submarine B-470 (1972), a Foxtrot-class submarine; sold to India as INS Vagir (S41) of the Indian Navy's Vela class
- Soviet submarine B-470 (1990), a Kilo-class submarine; probably an active submarine in the Russian Navy
