= INS Vagsheer =

INS Vagsheer is the name of the following ships of the Indian Navy:

- INS Vagsheer (S26), a Kalvari-class submarine launched in 2022
- INS Vagsheer (S43), a Vela-class submarine launched in 1974 and decommissioned in 1997
