= Puneet Chadha =

Indian Navy admiral

Rear Admiral Puneet Chadha VSM
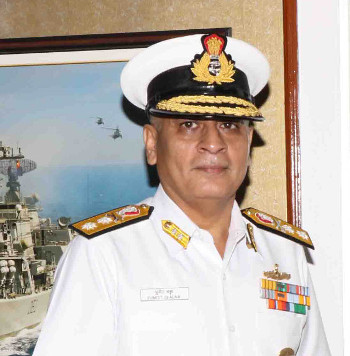
- Military career
- Allegiance: India
- Branch: Indian Navy
- Service years: 1987 - present
- Rank: Rear Admiral
- Commands: Tamil Nadu & Puducherry Naval Area; INS Viraat (R22); INS Ranjit (D53); INS Nireekshak (A15); INS Vibhuti (K45)
- Awards: Vishisht Seva Medal

Rear Admiral Puneet Chadha, VSM is a serving flag officer of the Indian Navy. He currently serves as the additional director general of the National Cadet Corps. He previously served as the flag officer commanding Tamil Nadu & Puducherry Naval Area (FOTNA) and as the deputy commandant of the Indian Naval Academy. As the last commanding officer of the aircraft carrier INS Viraat (R22), he decommissioned the carrier in 2017.

== Naval career ==
Chadha graduated from the National Defence Academy and was commissioned into the Indian Navy on 1 July 1987. He specialised in anti-submarine warfare (ASW). He attended the Malaysian Armed Forces Staff College, Kuala Lumpur. He has also attended the Higher Naval Command course at the Naval War College, Goa and the National Defence College. In his instructional appointments, Chadha has served as directing staff at Centre for Leadership and Behavioral Studies (CLABS) in Kochi and at the Defence Services Staff College, Wellington.

Chadha has commanded the Veer-class corvette INS Vibhuti (K45) and the Submarine rescue vessel INS Nireekshak (A15). He subsequently commanded the lead ship of her class of guided-missile destroyers INS Ranjit (D53). In 2016, he took over as commanding officer of the aircraft carrier INS Viraat (R22). He was in command of INS Viraat during the International Fleet Review 2016 (IFR 2016) at Visakhapatnam. IFR 2016 was the last action seen by Viraat as she was decommissioned soon after. As the 22nd and last CO of Viraat, Chadha decommissioned the aircraft carrier in a ceremony in Mumbai.

Chadha has served as the fleet operations officer of the Eastern Fleet, based in Visakhapatnam. He has served as director in the Perspective Planning directorate at the Army headquarters and as director net assessment in the Integrated Defence Staff headquarters. At Naval HQ, he has served as the director and principal director staff requirements.

=== Flag rank ===
On 27 March 2018, Chadha was promoted to the rank of rear admiral and appointed deputy commandant and chief instructor of the Indian Naval Academy, Ezhimala. After a year-long stint, he moved to Visakhapatnam as the chief staff officer (operations) of the Eastern Naval Command. As CSO (Ops), he led a delegation to China, participating in the PLA Navy International Fleet Review in April 2019. On 30 June 2020, he was appointed flag officer commanding Tamil Nadu & Puducherry Naval Area (FOTNA).

== Awards and decorations ==

Vishisht Seva Medal	Samanya Seva Medal	Special Service Medal	Operation Vijay Star
Operation Vijay Medal	Sainya Seva Medal	Videsh Seva Medal	50th Anniversary of Independence Medal
30 Years Long Service Medal	20 Years Long Service Medal		9 Years Long Service Medal

Military offices
Preceded by K. J. Kumar	Flag Officer Commanding Tamil Nadu & Puducherry Naval Area; 2020 – 2022	Succeeded by S. Venkat Raman
Preceded by M. D. Suresh	Deputy commandant Indian Naval Academy; 2018 – 2019	Succeeded by Tarun Sobti
Preceded by Rajesh Pendharkar	Commanding officer INS Viraat; 2016 - 2017	Ship decommissioned
