= College of Air Warfare =

Military unit

- Former names: School of Land and Air Warfare (SLAW); Joint Air Warfare School (JAWS)
- Motto: संगच्छध्वम (Sanskrit)
- Motto in English: United We Prepare
- Type: Defence Service Training Institute; War college
- Established: 01 July 1959
- Commandant: Air Vice Marshal Prasant Sarad Wadodkar
- Location: Secunderabad, Telangana, India
- Website: Official Website

College of Air Warfare (CAW) is a defence service training institution of the Indian Air Force. The college conducts courses and programmes in the art of Joint Warfare, with special emphasis on employment of Air Power. The functional and the administrative control of the college is with the Training Command of the IAF. The current Commandant of the college is Air Vice Marshal Prasant Sarad Wadodkar.

== History ==
The college was established on 1 July 1959 and was initially known as School of Land and Air Warfare (SLAW) situated at New Delhi. After receiving the approval from the President of India, SLAW moved to its present location in Secunderabad on 25 July 1959. Air Commodore K L Sondhi was the first Commandant. The college was inaugurated by the then Minister of Defence, V. K. Krishna Menon formally, on 3 September 1959. The School of Land Warfare was renamed as the Joint Air Warfare School (JAWS) on 25 November 1967, with the introduction of Naval aspects of warfare. It was renamed the "College of Air Warfare" in January 1976 after the IAF received sanction from the President on 9 November 1975.

== Location ==
The college is located on the busy Sardar Patel Road in Secunderabad. It overlooks the expanse of the General K. V. Krishna Rao Parade Ground. The campus is situated about 1.5 km from the Secunderabad Junction railway station and the Begumpet Airport.

== Courses ==
CAW conducts the following courses

- Higher Air Command Course (HACC)
- Professional Knowledge Course-Flying (PKC-F)
- Space Operations and Spatial Technology Course (SOSTC)
- Space Law Course (SLC)
- Warfare and Aerospace Strategy Program (WASP)
- Ground Liaison Officers Course (GLOC)
- Senior Officers Study Period (SOSP)
- Mid-Career Interaction Programme (MCIP)
- Weapon to Target Matching (WTM)

== Objectives ==
The training objectives of the college are:

- To assist in development of Air Force doctrines, concepts and strategy.
- To study and teach 'Air Power' and conduct training in concepts of Air Warfare.
- To conduct training in Joint Air Operations for officers of Army, Navy and Air Force.
- To conduct computer aided War-Games of the Air War.
- To establish and maintain liaison with similar organisations in the other countries.
- To impart training to junior and middle level officers of the Indian Air Force in leadership and behavioural sciences, so as to improve their qualities of leadership and man management.
- To research, compile and publish books on IAF Personalities, Institutions, Campaigns and Squadrons.

== List of Commandants ==
S.No	Name	Assumed office	Left office
Commandant School of Land and Air Warfare
1	Air Commodore K L Sondhi	14 July 1959	7 December 1959
2	Air Commodore S N Goyal	11 December 1959	31 March 1961
3	Air Commodore H S Ratnagar	6 June 1961	12 January 1966
4	Air Commodore A R Pandit, DFC	13 January 1966	24 November 1967
Commandant Joint Air Warfare School
1	Air Commodore A R Pandit, DFC	25 November 1967	14 December 1967
2	Air Commodore P C Ramachandran, AFC	15 December 1967	30 September 1970
3	Air Commodore FVA Scudder, AVSM	15 October 1970	7 May 1972
4	Air Commodore S S Achreja	24 May 1972	29 February 1976
5	Air Commodore R P Sinha	1 March 1976	11 November 1976
Commandant College of Air Warfare
1	Air Commodore R P Sinha	12 November 1976	31 March 1980
2	Air Commodore A M Shahane	12 November 1980	2 August 1981
3	Air Vice Marshal Man Singh, AVSM, VM, VSM	3 August 1981	16 December 1984
4	Air Vice Marshal I D Bhalla, AVSM	17 December 1984	31 July 1986
5	Air Vice Marshal R K Dhawan, AVSM, VM	20 August 1986	14 February 1988
6	Air Vice Marshal P J Jayakumar, AVSM	15 February 1988	2 July 1989
7	Air Vice Marshal Dushyant Singh, VM, VSM	3 July 1989	8 March 1991
8	Air Vice Marshal V Kapila, AVSM, VrC	11 March 1991	31 May 1992
9	Air Vice Marshal Jagbir Singh, VrC	19 October 1992	30 December 1994
10	Air Vice Marshal S S Hussain Naqvi, AVSM, VrC	31 December 1994	31 August 1997
11	Air Vice Marshal A K Trikha, AVSM, VSM	3 October 1997	31 August 1999
12	Air Vice Marshal A R Ghandhi, AVSM, VrC	1 September 1999	31 March 2001
13	Air Vice Marshal D E Jonas, AVSM	1 April 2001	31 April 2004
14	Air Vice Marshal V R Iyer	1 November 2004	31 January 2007
15	Air Vice Marshal K G Bewoor, AVSM, VM	1 February 2007	22 March 2009
16	Air Vice Marshal PS Gill, AVSM, VM	23 March 2009	31 December 2010
17	Air Vice Marshal D P Upot, VSM	2 May 2011	30 November 2014
18	Air Vice Marshal Sreekumar Prabhakaran, VM	1 December 2014	19 June 2016
19	Air Vice Marshal Upakarjeet Singh, AVSM	20 June 2016	28 February 2017
20	Air Vice Marshal R Radhish, AVSM, VM	1 March 2017	12 November 2018
21	Air Vice Marshal Suraj Kumar Jha	13 November 2018	30 September 2019
22	Air Vice Marshal Dilip Kumar Patnaik, VM	1 October 2019	31 July 2020
23	Air Vice Marshal K. S. K. Suresh, VM	1 August 2021	4 September 2022
24	Air Vice Marshal Manish Khanna	5 September 2022	2 July 2023
24	Air Vice Marshal Prasant Sarad Wadodkar	1 September 2023	Present

== See also ==
- Army War College, Mhow
- Naval War College, Goa
- Indian National Defence University
- Military Academies in India
- Tactics and Air Combat and Defence Establishment (TACDE)
- Vijeta-1982 Hindi film
