= Submarine base =

Military base that shelters submarines and their personnel

A submarine base is a military base that shelters submarines and their personnel. Examples of present-day submarine bases include HMNB Clyde, Île Longue (the base for France's Force océanique stratégique), Naval Submarine Base Kings Bay, Naval Submarine Base New London, and Rybachiy Nuclear Submarine Base (near Petropavlovsk-Kamchatsky).

INS Virbahu, INS Vajrabahu and INS Satavahana are the submarine bases of the Indian Navy. A new underground submarine base, INS Varsha is under construction near Vishakhapatnam for the new expanding fleet of Indian nuclear submarines.

The Israeli navy bases its growing submarine force in Haifa.

Former submarine bases include DORA 1, HMAS Platypus, Naval Submarine Base Bangor (now part of Naval Base Kitsap), Mare Island Naval Shipyard (a nuclear-capable base), Ordnance Island in Bermuda during World War II, and the formerly-classified Soviet base at Balaklava in the now Autonomous Republic of Crimea.

The Holland Torpedo Boat Station at hamlet of New Suffolk, New York claims to be the first submarine base in the United States: it served as the base for USS Holland, a submarine launched in May 1897 and several Plunger class submarines launched 1901–1903.

However, the United States Navy claims Naval Submarine Base New London was the Navy's first submarine base, having been so designated in 1916.

== See also ==
- Submarine pen
- List of countries operating submarines
- United States Navy submarine bases
- Shore facility
- Airbase
- Naval base
- Loss of Strength Gradient

== Gallery ==
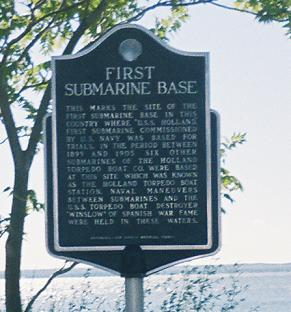
Holland Torpedo Boat Station Plaque stating New Suffolk, New York's claim to be the first submarine base.

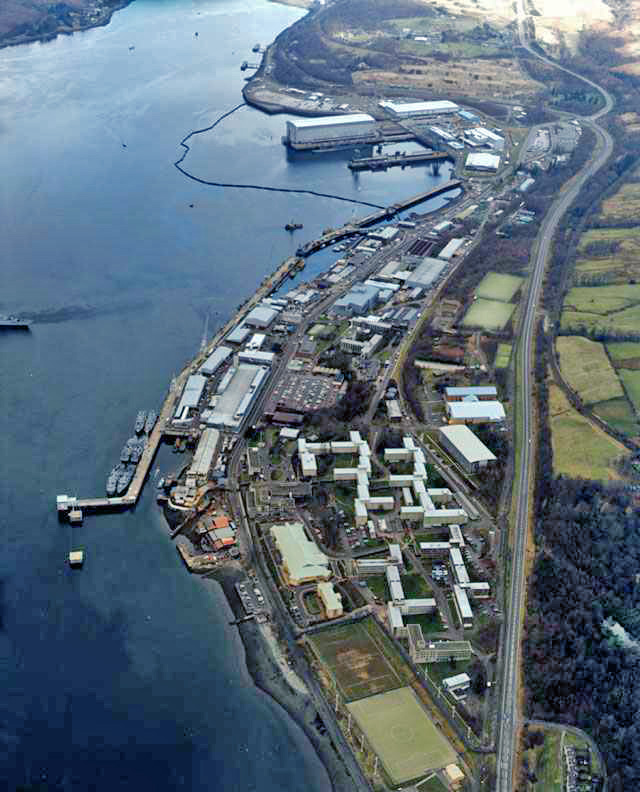
HMNB Clyde

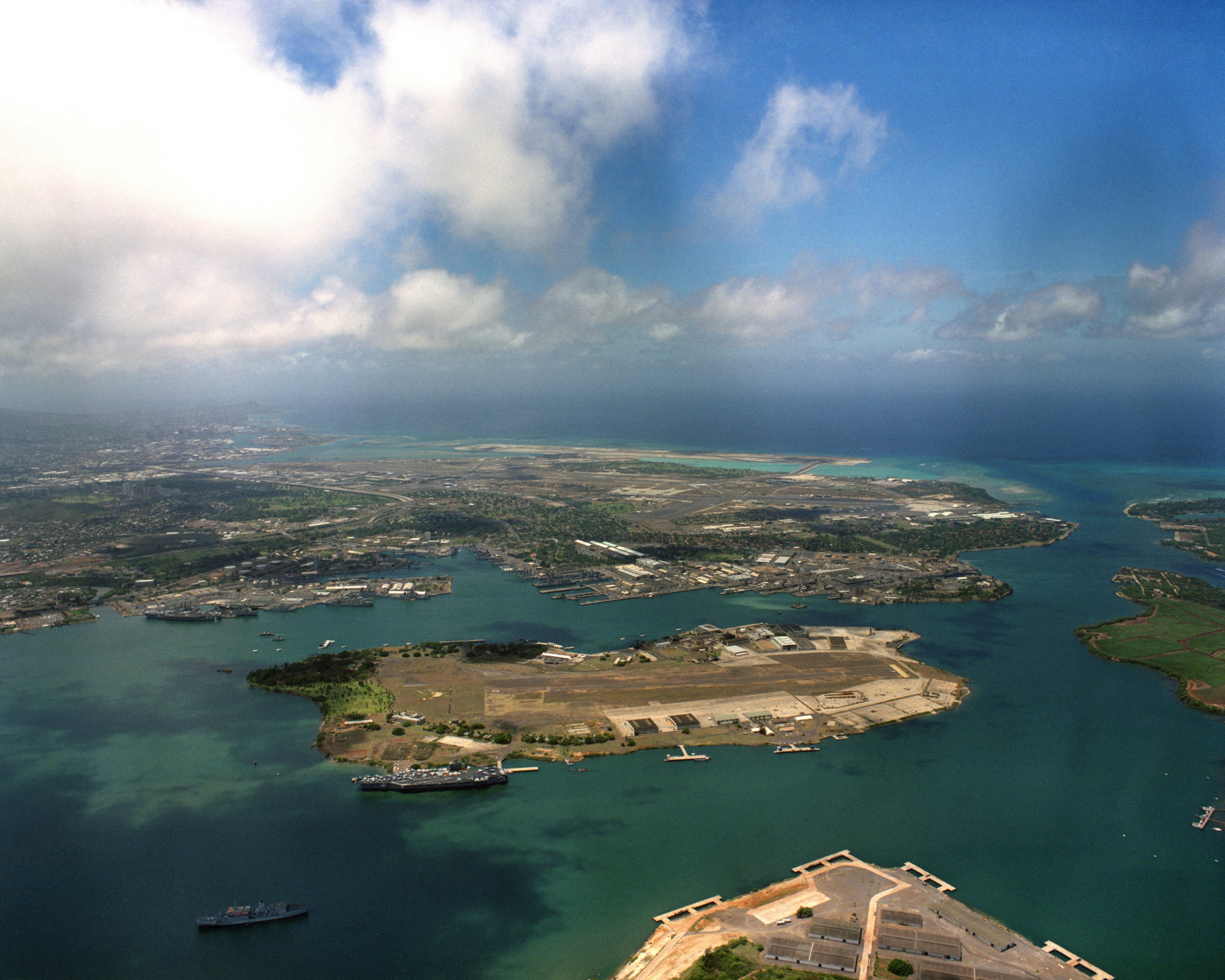
Naval Station Pearl Harbor

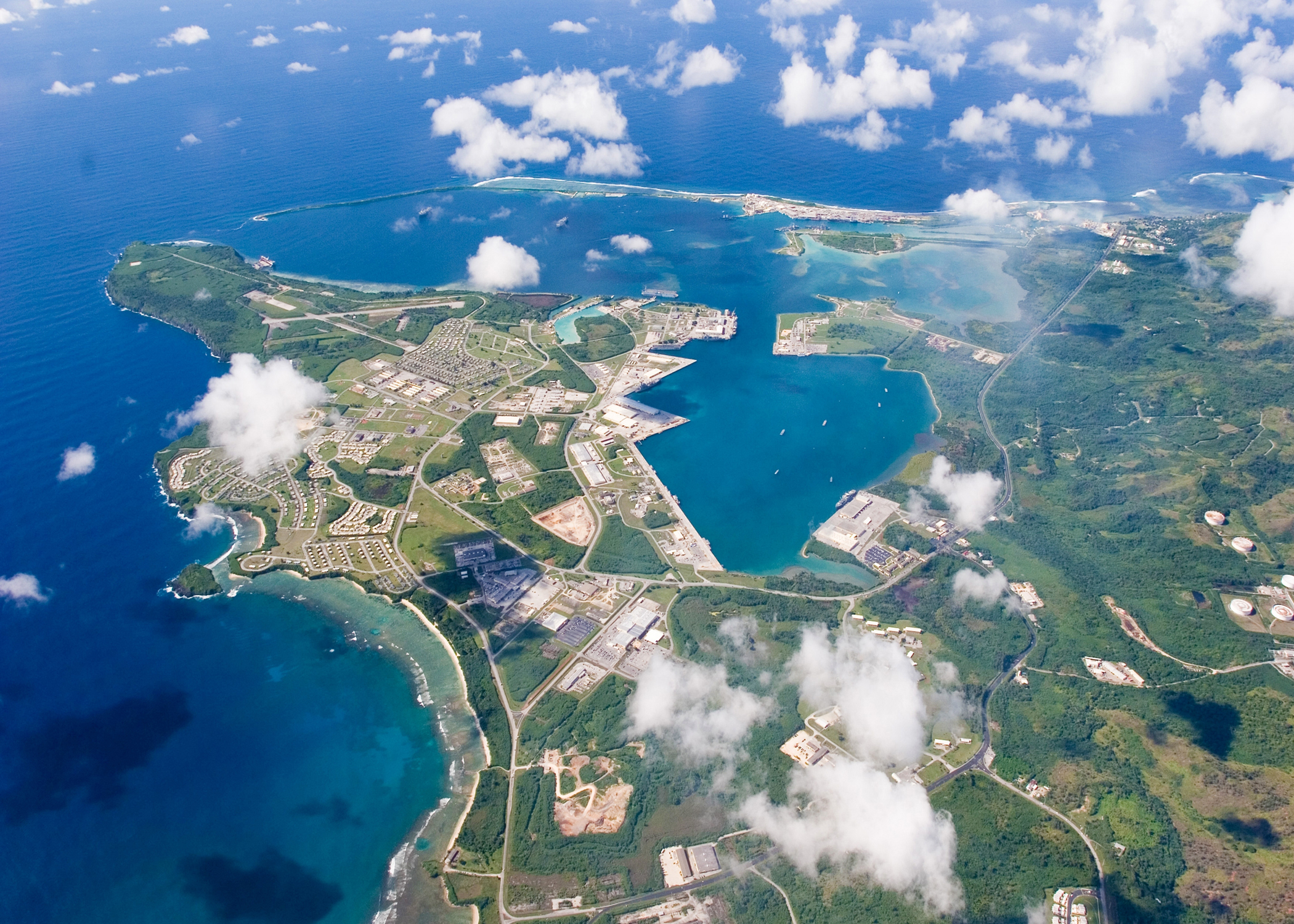
Naval Base Guam

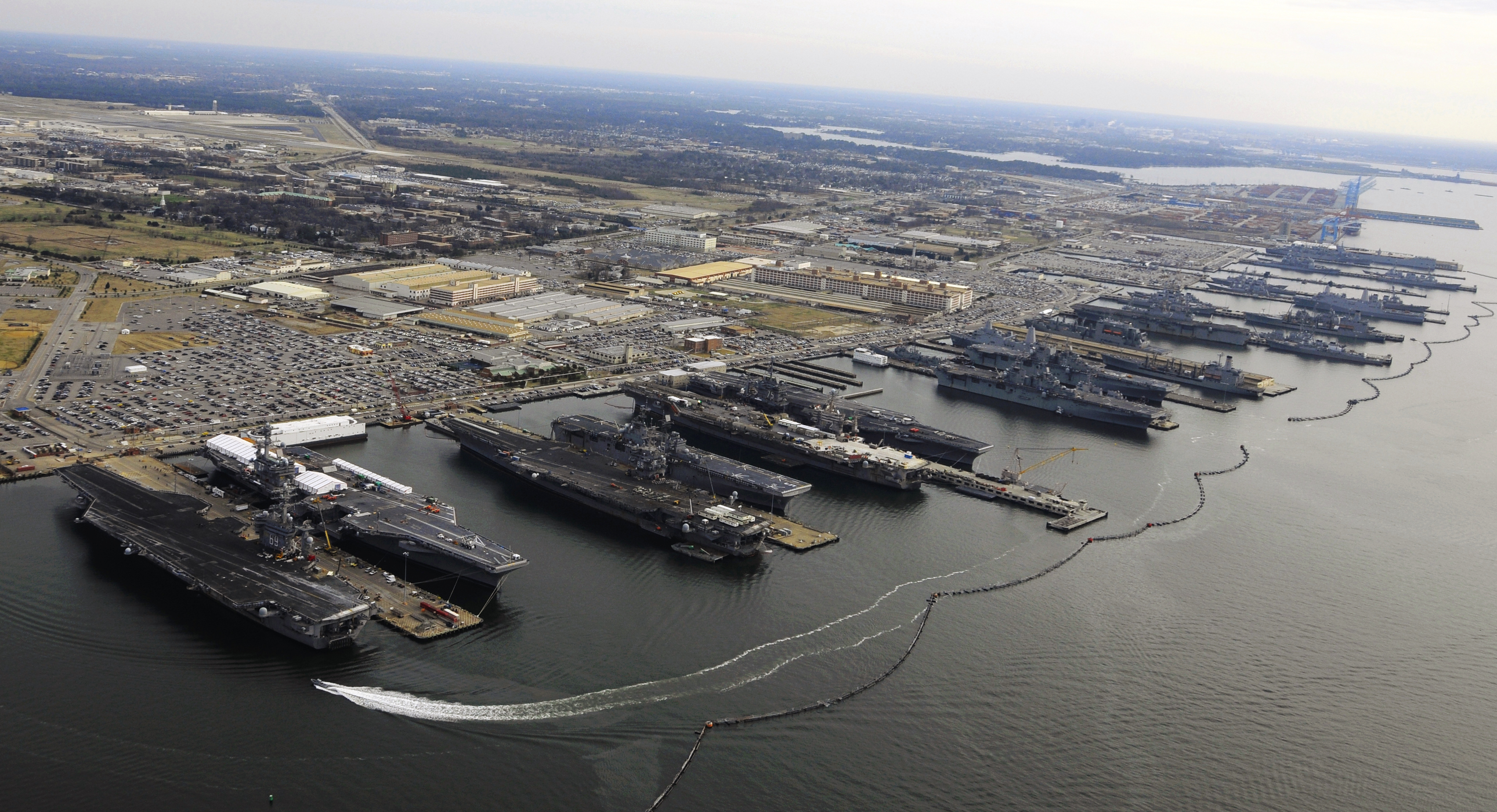
Naval Station Norfolk

Naval Base Point Loma

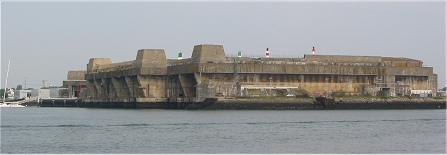
Keroman III submarine pen, part of the former German submarine base in Lorient, Brittany.

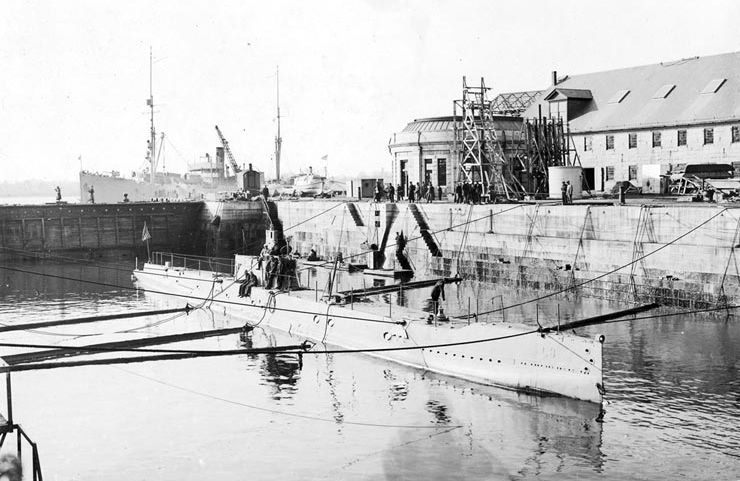
Portsmouth Naval Shipyard with L-8 in 1917, the first submarine built by a US Navy shipyard

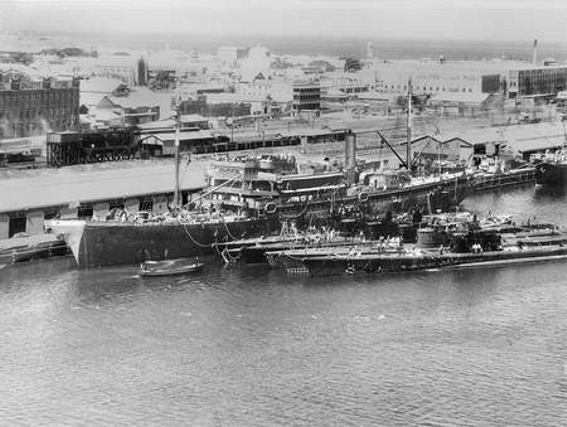
USS Holland (AS-3) tending submarines at Fremantle submarine base, Australia, on 5 March 1942

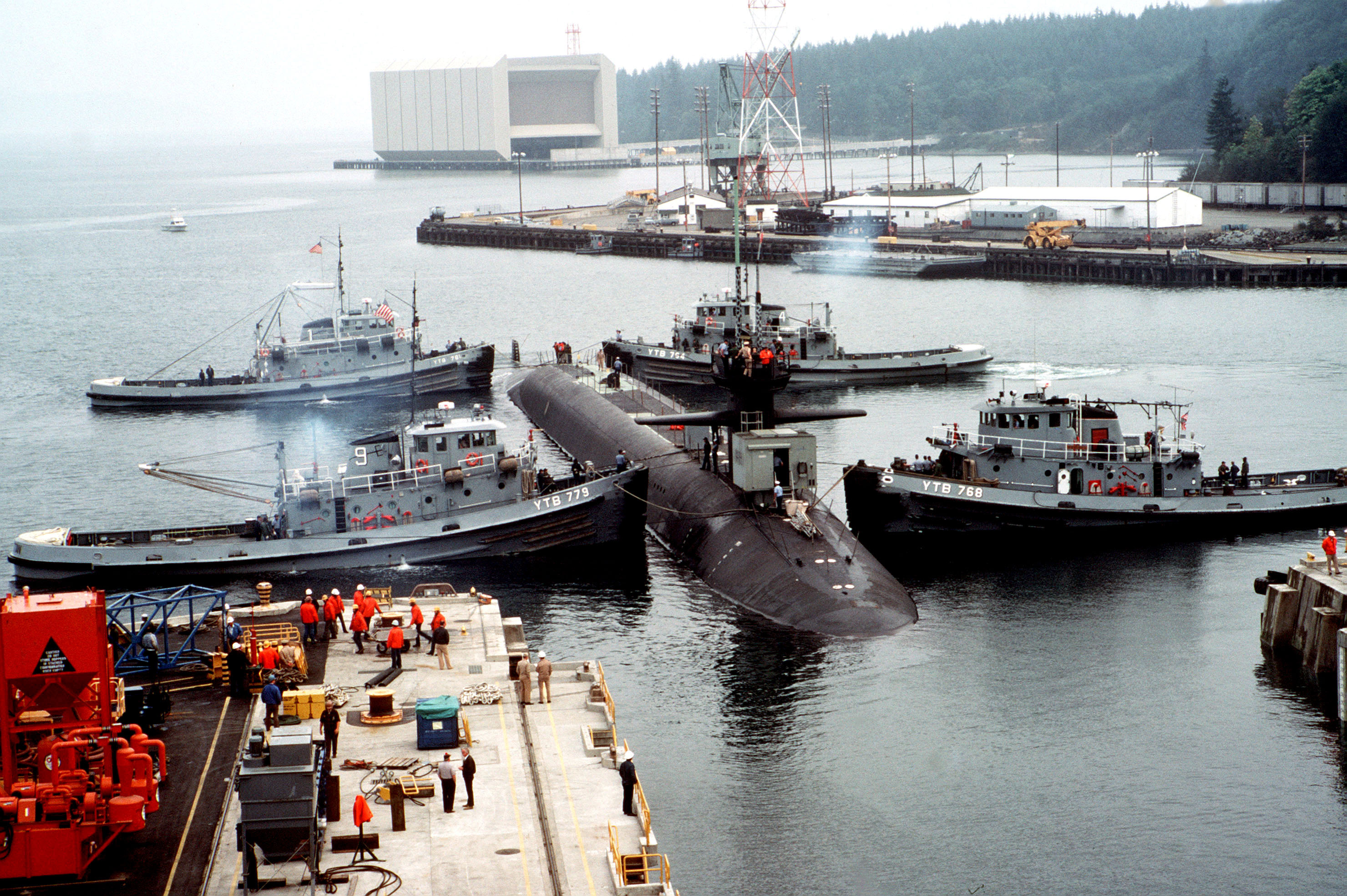
Naval Submarine Base Bangor with tug Mishawaka (rear left) and three other Natick-class tugs guiding the USS Ohio (SSGN-726) out of dry dock at Delta Pier

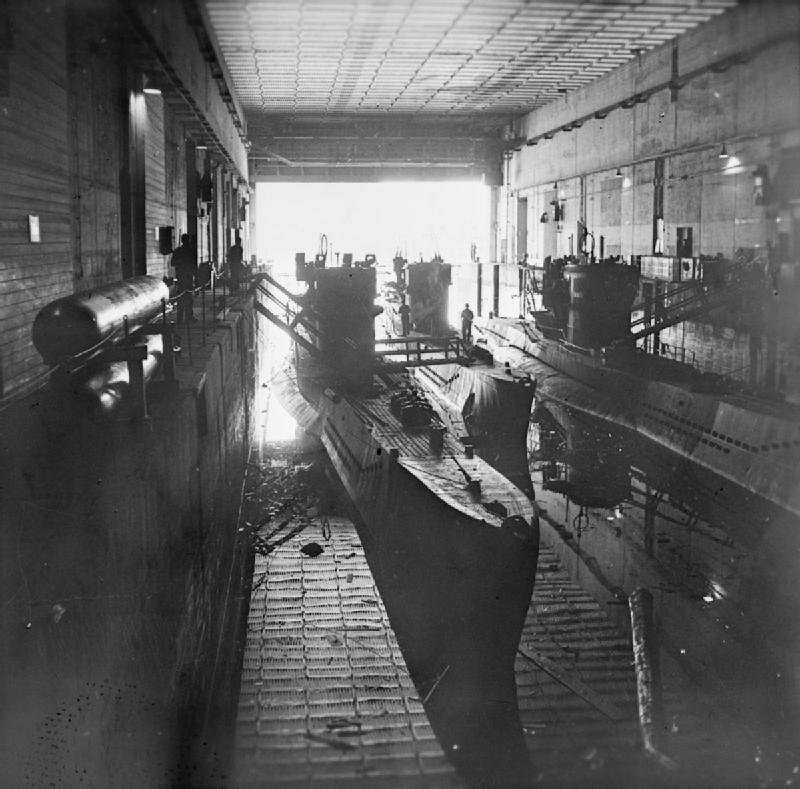
Three U-boats in a submarine pen at Dora I in Trondheim, 19 May 1945

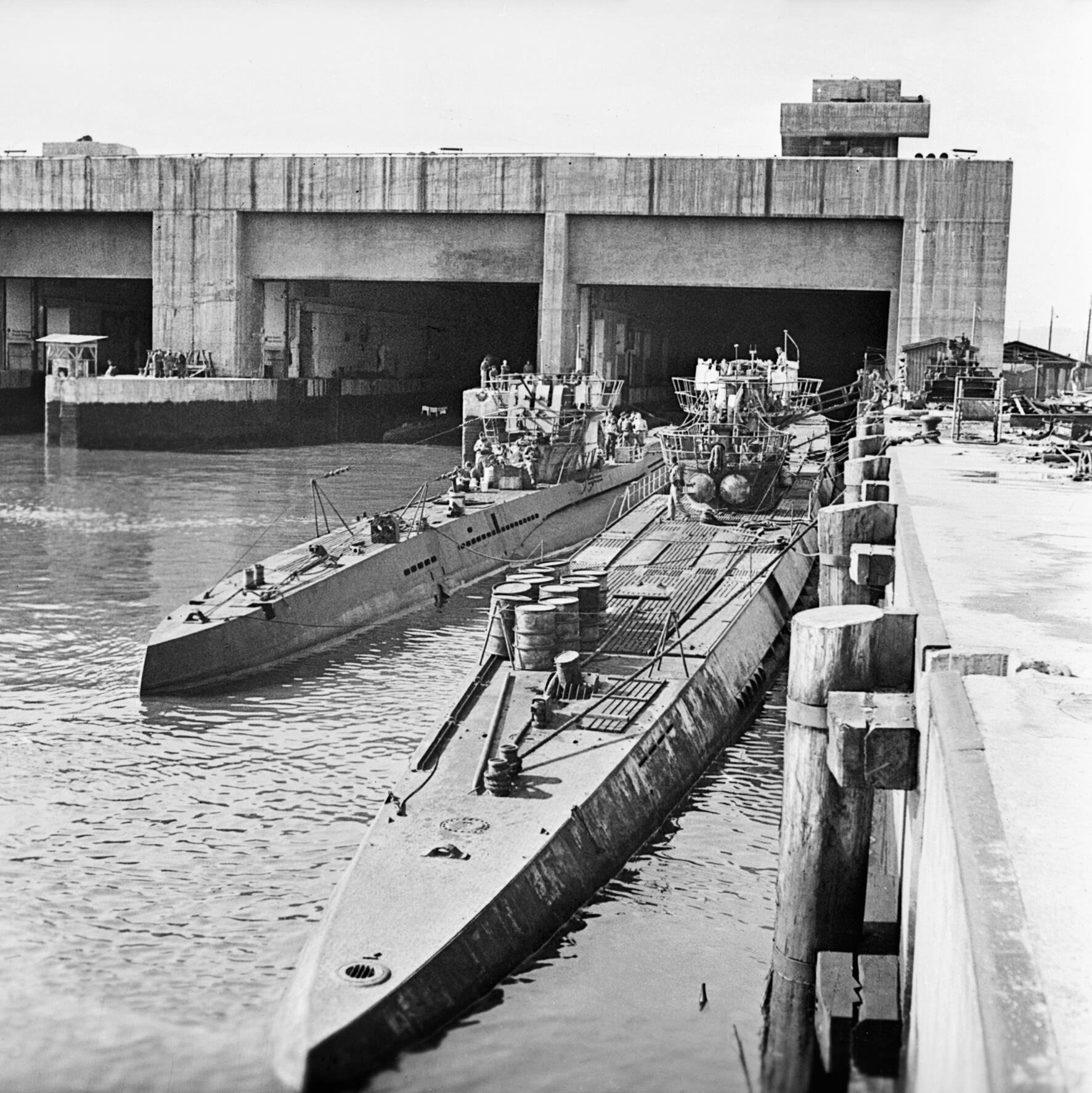
German type VII and IX U-boats at Trondheim after the war on 19 May 1945
