= INS Vajrabahu =

Coordinates: 18°55′34.428″N 72°50′11.5434″E

- Mumbai, Maharashtra
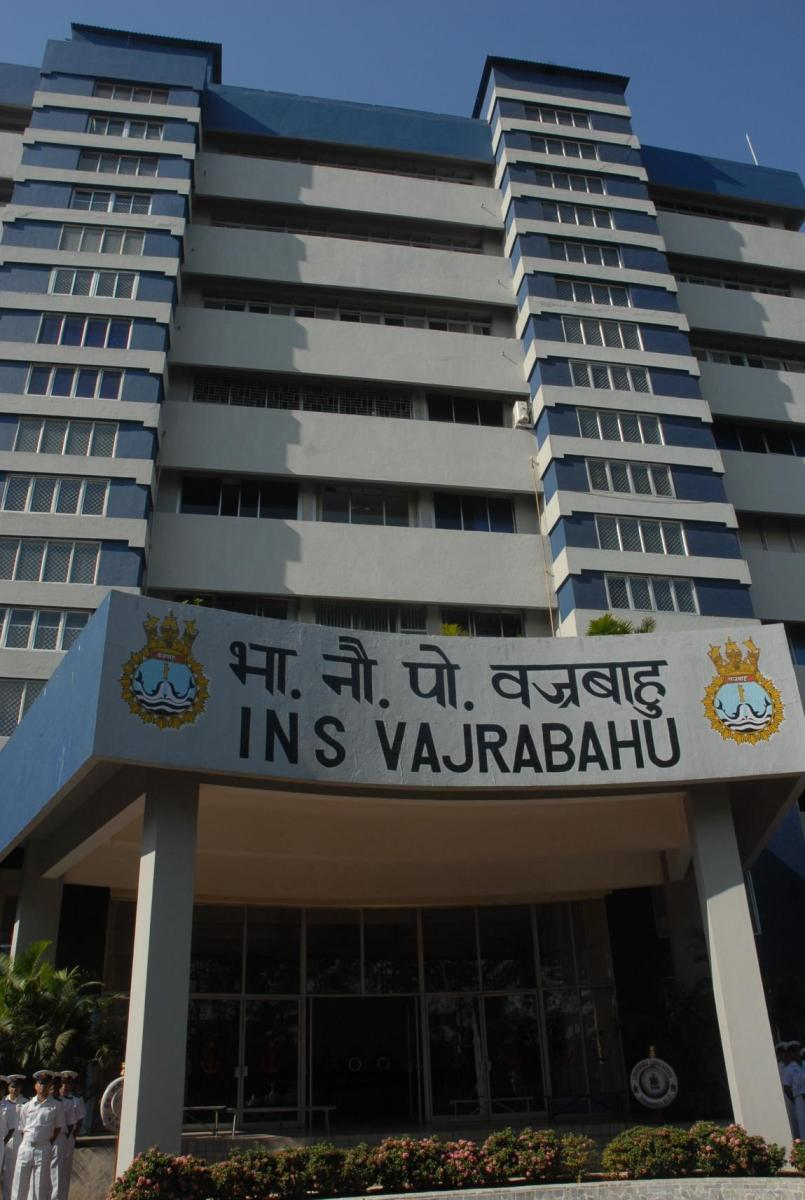

Site information
- Type: Naval station
- Controlled by: Indian Navy
- Condition: Operational

Site history
- Built: 1 February 1996
- In use: 1987-present

Garrison information
- Occupants: Western Naval Command

INS Vajrabahu is an Indian Navy submarine base of the Western Naval Command located near Mumbai in Maharashtra. It was commissioned on 1 February 1996.

== History ==
After the Indian Navy acquired the Vela class submarines in 1973 from the Soviet Union, the submarine base operated from temporary facilities in Mumbai. The base hosted the office of Captain Submarines (SM), 9th submarine squadron (who was initially the ex-officio Commanding Officer of the submarine depot ship, INS Amba. The facilities for the submarine base continued to expand over time. A submarine base complex (SMBC) was commissioned on 22 August 1987 as A-14 building by the then Chief of the Naval Staff Admiral R. H. Tahiliani in Mumbai for the submarine fleet of the Western Naval Command.

This operations base was expanded to include submarine support facilities and commissioned as INS Vajrabahu on 1 February 1996 by Admiral Vijai Singh Shekhawat. In the ensuing years, a Submarine Motion Control Simulator, Attack Simulator and a water tower building were added to the base.

== Objective ==
The base operates and maintains a sizable part of the Submarine Arm of the Indian Navy by providing material and logistic support to the Sindhughosh-class and Shishumar-class submarines based in Mumbai. The 12th submarine squadron, composed of Sindhughosh-class, was established in March 1990 and the 10th submarine squadron, composed of four Shishumar-class, was established in February 1992. It also has a non-dieted sick bay and handles preparation and maintenance of individual escape suits for submarine personnel. INS Vajrabahu is the seat of the Commodore Commanding Submarines (West) (COMCOS (W)). The COMCOS is also the commanding officer of the base.

== See also ==
Indian Navy

- Commodore Commanding Submarines (West)
- INS Virbahu
- List of Indian Navy bases
- List of active Indian Navy ships

Integrated commands and units

- Armed Forces Special Operations Division
- Defence Cyber Agency
- Integrated Defence Staff
- Integrated Space Cell
- Indian Nuclear Command Authority
- Indian Armed Forces
- Special Forces of India

Other lists

- Strategic Forces Command
- List of Indian Air Force stations
- List of Indian Navy bases
- India's overseas military bases
