= USS Charles Whittemore =

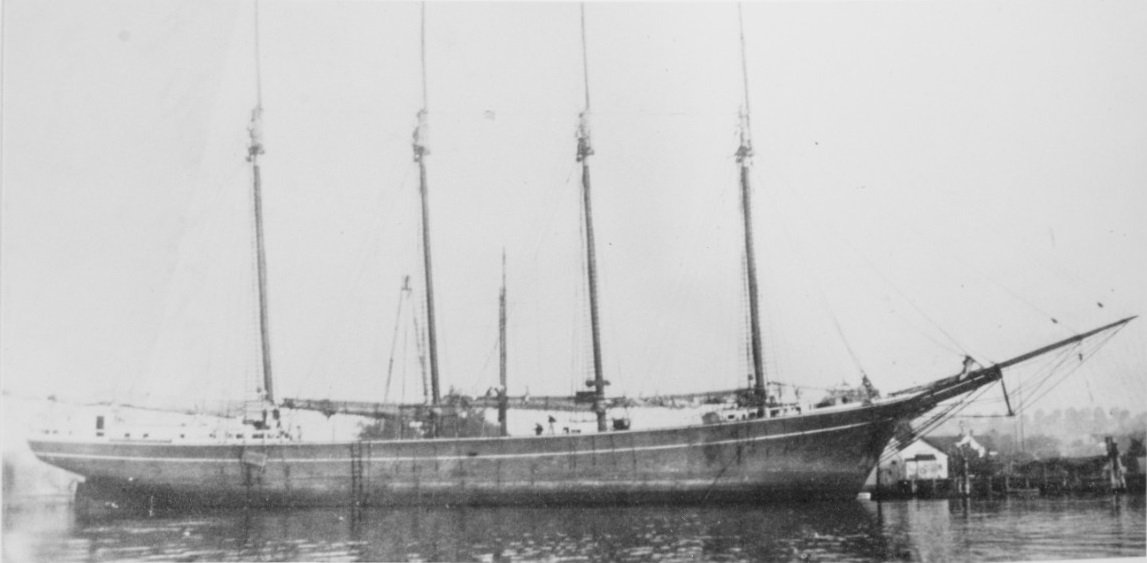
- Schooner Charles Whittemore

History

United States
- Name: Charles Whittemore
- Builder: Michael B. McDonald and Sons, Mystic, Connecticut
- Launched: 1905
- Acquired: 1918
- Commissioned: 9 August 1918
- Decommissioned: 20 May 1919
- Stricken: 20 May 1919
- Identification: ID-3232
- Fate: Abandoned at sea 11 January 1927

General characteristics
- Type: Q-ship
- Displacement: 693 long tons (704 t)
- Length: 204 ft (62 m)
- Beam: 38 ft 2 in (11.63 m)
- Draft: 15 ft 6 in (4.72 m)
- Propulsion: Sails
- Sail plan: 4-masted schooner
- Complement: 7 (as civilian cargo ship)
- Armament: None

USS Charles Whittemore (ID-3232) was a four masted lumber schooner used as a decoy ship against German U-boats during World War I.

== History ==
Charles Whittemore was built by Michael B. McDonald and Sons of Mystic, Connecticut. She was launched on September 21, 1905, six weeks after McDonald's shipyard went into receivership. Her original owner was F. P. Boggs of Boston. Her first master was Captain S. H. Perry. She was originally employed in the lumber trade between South Carolina and Nova Scotia.

On March 13, 1918 Charles Whittemore lost her rudder in a storm off of Block Island, Rhode Island. The former Spanish cruiser USS Don Juan de Austria was sent from the Naval Station in Newport, Rhode Island to tow Charles Whittemore to Newport. She was then purchased by the United States Navy and taken to New London, Connecticut, for outfitting as a "decoy vessel".

At this point, the single greatest naval threat to the United States was German U-boats. As effective anti-submarine methods had not yet been developed, many novel approaches were used. In the case of Charles Whittemore it was decided that she would resume her role as an innocuous merchant ship in the hopes that she would become a target for U-boats. As Charles Whittemore was a relatively small sailing vessel, it was likely that a U-boat commander would not consider her worth a torpedo. Instead, it was hoped, a submarine would surface and attempt to sink Charles Whittemore with its deck gun. In anticipation of this eventuality, Charles Whittemore would be towing a submarine on the theory that the submarine could sink the U-boat before Charles Whittemore would be sunk.

USS Charles Whittemore was commissioned on 9 August 1918.

The schooner cleared New London 15 August 1918 towing the submarine USS N-5 (SS-57) bound for the shipping lanes in the North Atlantic where it was hoped German submarines would attack a seemingly defenseless ship. Since no contact was made with the enemy, and N-5 broke loose during a storm, Charles Whittemore returned to New London on 9 September. She later conducted a similar mission with the submarine USS L-8 without encountering a hostile submarine.

Continuing her service with the Atlantic Submarine Force, the Charles Whittemore carried submarine supplies, vital spare parts, and other cargo between New York, Newport, New London, Bermuda, and Charleston, S. C., until 14 May 1919 when she returned to New York from Hampton Roads to be sold. She was decommissioned and transferred to her new owner 20 May 1919.

== Merchant service ==
In December 1926, the schooner was sold by Irving G Hall, Jr, of Boston to the Kelley-Wilkie Company at LaHave, Nova Scotia. She was transferred to the British flag and registered at LaHave

Charles Whittemore was damaged by fire and dismasted in a storm off Cape Cod on 11 January 1927, then abandoned at sea. By 13 January the derelict had been picked up by an American government steamer and was in tow for Provincetown, Massachusetts.

== Bibliography ==
- Beyer, Edward F. & Beyer, Kenneth M. (1991). "U. S. Navy Mystery Ships". Warship International. XXVIII (4). International Naval Research Organization: 322–372. ISSN 0043-0374.
