= War college =

Senior military academy

A war college is a senior military academy which is normally intended for veteran military officers and whose purpose is to educate and 'train on' senior military tacticians, strategists, and leaders. It is also often the place where advanced tactical and strategic thought is conducted, both for the purpose of developing doctrine and for the purpose of identifying implications and shifts in long-term patterns.

== Naval colleges ==
- Naval War College, Goa of the Indian Navy
- Naval War College (Japan) of the Imperial Japanese Navy (Defunct)
- Pakistan Navy War College of the Pakistan Navy
- Naval War College of the United States Navy
- Royal Naval War College of the Royal Navy (Defunct)

== Army colleges ==
- Army War College, Mhow of the Indian Army
- Army War College (Japan) of the Imperial Japanese Army (Defunct)
- United States Army War College of the United States Army

== Air Force colleges ==
- College of Air Warfare of the Indian Air Force
- PAF Air War College of the Pakistan Air Force
- USAF Air War College of the United States Air Force
- RAF College of Air Warfare of the Royal Air Force (Defunct)

== War colleges ==
- War College of the Azerbaijani Armed Forces of the Azerbaijani Armed Forces
- National Defence College (Bangladesh) of the Ministry of Defence (Bangladesh)
- Marine Corps War College of the United States Marine Corps
- National War College of the United States Department of Defense
- War College of the Finnish National Defence University
- National Security College (Israel)
- Prussian Staff College, also known as Prussian War College, active 1810-1914 and 1935–1945, Kingdom of Prussia, German Empire, and Nazi Germany
