= Flag Officer Commanding Tamil Nadu & Puducherry Naval Area =

Flag Officer Commanding Tamil Nadu & Puducherry Naval Area (FOTNA)
- Flag of the FOTNA (Rear Admiral's flag)
- Incumbent; Rear Admiral Upal Kundu VSM since 12 January 2025
- Indian Navy
- Abbreviation: FOTNA
- Reports to: Flag Officer Commanding-in-Chief Eastern Naval Command
- Seat: Chennai
- First holder: Rear Admiral Alok Bhatnagar (as FOTNA)

Flag Officer Commanding Tamil Nadu & Puducherry Naval Area (FOTNA) is a senior appointment in the Indian Navy. One of the five Area Commanders of the Indian Navy, the FOTNA is a two star admiral holding the rank of Rear Admiral. The FOTNA is responsible for the operations and administration of all units and establishments in the state of Tamil Nadu and the union territory of Puducherry. The Current FOTNA is Rear Admiral Upal Kundu, VSM, who assumed office on 1 February 2025.

== History ==
A Naval office was set up in Chennai in the early 1940s. The first Naval Officer-in-Charge (NOIC) was Captain R. A. Malhuish. In 1946, the NOIC was re-designated Resident Naval Officer (RNO). With INS Adyar being recommissioned in 1954, the strength of the naval base grew and in 1968, the RNO was designated NOIC (Madras), and was responsible to the Flag Officer Commanding-in-Chief Eastern Naval Command. The NOIC (Madras) also discharged the duties of Commanding Officer INS Adyar.

With increasing responsibilities, a new appointment of NOIC (Tuticorin) was created in December 1994. The Commanding Officer INS Kattabomman dual-hatted as the NOIC(T) with the responsibility of local naval defence along the coast from the Gulf of Mannar up to Kerala. The units and installations along the coast in the Bay of Bengal up to the Pamban Pass was under the NOIC (Madras). The two appointments were merged again after a few years and the new appointment of NOIC (Tamil Nadu & Pondicherry) was created.

In November 2015, the billet was upgraded to two-star rank and rechristened Flag Officer Commanding Tamil Nadu & Puducherry Naval Area (FOTNA). Commodore Alok Bhatnagar, the NOIC (TN&P) was promoted to the rank of Rear Admiral and took over as the first FOTNA.

== Organisation ==
The FOTNA is assisted by the NOIC (TN&P), a one-star appointment. The NOIC (TN&P) also serves as the Chief Staff Officer at Headquarters Tamil Nadu & Puducherry Naval Area (HQTN&P). The FOTNA is responsible to the Flag Officer Commanding-in-Chief Eastern Naval Command for the operations and administration of all units and establishments in Tamil Nadu and Puducherry. This includes all ships and submarines based at the Karwar Naval Base as well. The establishments under the FOTNA include:

- The Naval Base INS Adyar
- The naval air station INS Parundu
- The naval air station INS Rajali
- The naval helicopter training school INAS 561
- The VLF-transmission facility INS Kattabomman
- Naval Coast Battery, Chennai
- Forward Operating Base, Tuticorin
- Sagar Prahari Bal, Chennai

== List of Commanders ==
S.No.	Name	Assumed office	Left office	Notes
1	Rear Admiral Alok Bhatnagar NM	30 June 2015	31 March 2019	First FOTNA. Later Additional Director General, NCC.
2	Rear Admiral K. J. Kumar VSM	1 April 2019	30 June 2020	Earlier Flag Officer Commanding Karnataka Naval Area.
3	Rear Admiral Puneet Chadha NM	30 June 2020	20 May 2022	Later Additional Director General, NCC.
4	Rear Admiral S. Venkat Raman VSM	20 May 2022	25 April 2023	Earlier Commandant, Naval War College.
5	Rear Admiral Ravi Kumar Dhingra VSM	25 April 2023	12 January 2025	
6	Rear Admiral Satish Shenai NM	12 January 2025	31 January 2026	
7	Rear Admiral Upal Kundu VSM	1 February 2026	Present	Current FOTNA.

== Bibliography ==
- Doraibabu, M; Godbole, Amrut (2023), A Decade of Transformation: The Indian Navy 2011-2021, Harper Collins Publishers India, ISBN 9789394407909
- Hiranandani, Vice Admiral GM (2013), Transition to Guardianship: The Indian Navy 1991–2000, Lancer Publishers LLC, ISBN 978-1-935501-66-4
