= Army War College, Mhow =

Indian military institution

Army War College
- Former name: College of Combat
- Motto: युध्दाय कृत निश्चयः (Sanskrit)
- Motto in English: Enter into Battle with Resolve
- Type: War college
- Established: 1 April 1971; 55 years ago (As College of Combat)
- Affiliations: Devi Ahilya Vishwavidyalaya, Indore
- Commandant: Lieutenant General Ajay Chandpuria AVSM VSM
- Location: Mhow (Dr. Ambedkar Nagar), Madhya Pradesh, India
- Campus: 533.5 acres (2.159 km^{2})

The Army War College, Mhow (AWC) is a defence service training and research institution of the Indian Army located in Mhow, Madhya Pradesh. It conducts research in tactics, logistics, contemporary military studies and military doctrine. The college trains about 2,500–3,000 officers of the Indian Armed Forces and paramilitary forces each year.

== History ==
The college was originally the College of Combat at Mhow on 1 April 1971 following the merger of the Senior Officers' and Tactical Wings of the Infantry School, Mhow.

The Junior Command Course was also started at the College. Later they separated the College of Combat from the Infantry School.

The foundation stone of the new college campus was laid on 6 January 1983 by the then Chief of the Army Staff, General K. V. Krishna Rao. The institution remained on the campus of Infantry School until the college moved in August 1988. On 1 January 2003, the college was renamed Army War College, Mhow.

== Training ==
AWC develops doctrines and trains Army personnel for operations in environments to which the Indian Army forces are typically deployed. AWC aims to train forces for synchronised operation with other services of the armed forces.

It develops and validates new operational and logistic concepts through conceptual studies, war games, discussions and seminars.

AWC courses include:

- Higher Command Course (HC)
- Senior Command Course (SC)
- Junior Command Course (JC)
- Defence Management Course.

The Higher Command course (HCC) is part of a Master of Philosophy programme in Defence Management, affiliated with the Devi Ahilya Vishwavidyalaya (Indore University). The HCC is aimed at officers of the rank of Colonel, Captain and Group Captain who have completed their command tenure.

About 2,500–3,000 officers of the Indian Army and Indian paramilitary forces undergo training each year, accompanied by about 100 officers of foreign armies.

== Journal ==
The college publishes War College Journal, previously Combat Journal.

== Awards ==
The College was awarded the GOC-in-C (Army Training Command)'s unit citation in 2014.

== See also ==
- Naval War College, Goa
- College of Air Warfare
- Indian National Defence University
- Military Academies in India
