= Arjun Dev Nair =

Flag officer in the Indian Navy

Rear Admiral Arjun Dev Nair VSM
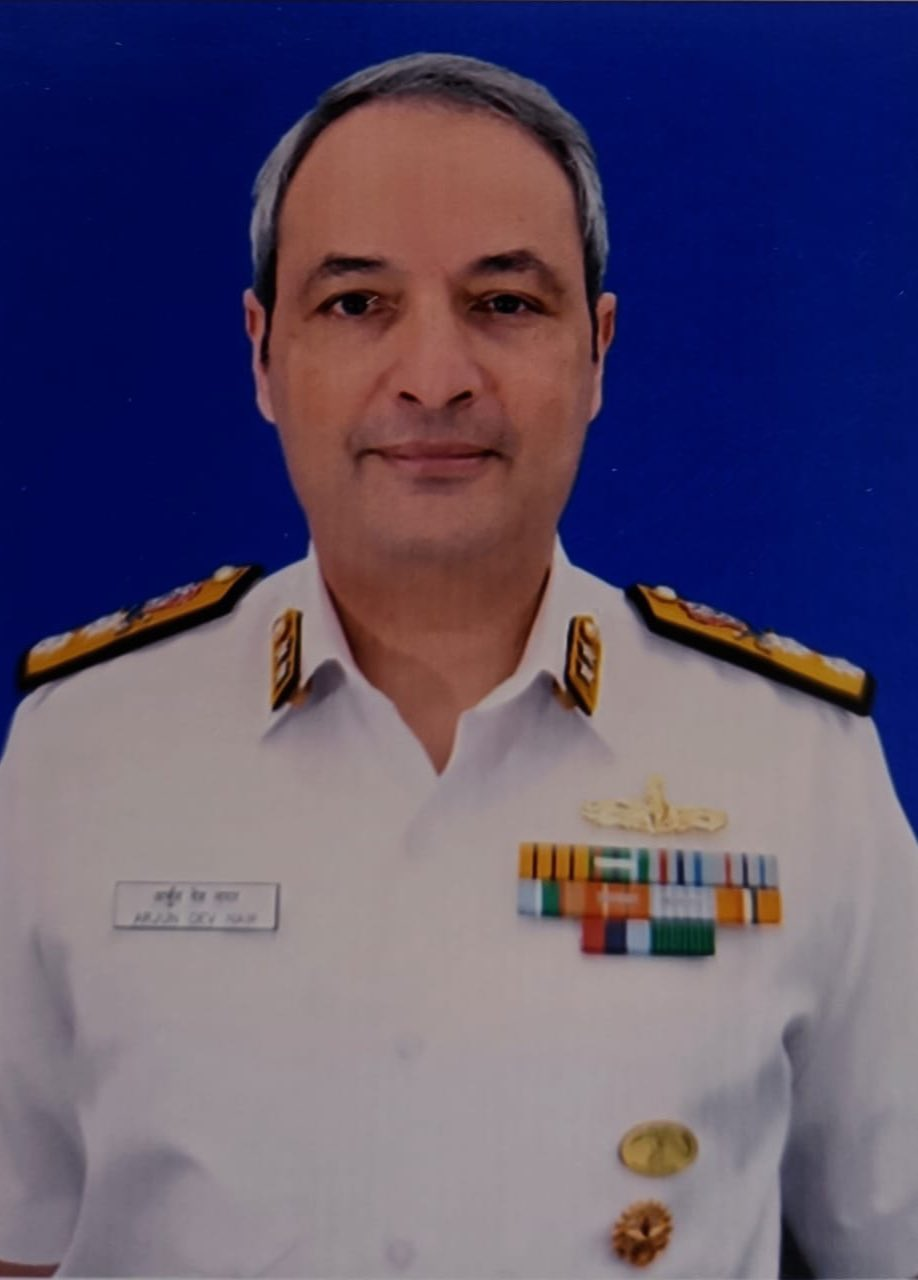
- Education: Indian Naval Academy
- Military career
- Allegiance: India
- Branch: Indian Navy
- Service years: 1991 - 31 October 2026
- Rank: Rear Admiral
- Commands: INS Trikand (F51); INS Kirpan (P44); INS Nashak (K83); TRV A72
- Awards: Vishisht Seva Medal

Rear Admiral Arjun Dev Nair, VSM is a former Flag officer in the Indian Navy. He last served as the Commandant of the Naval War College, Goa.

== Naval career ==
Nair was commissioned into the Executive Branch of the Indian Navy on 1 July 1991. He received the Midshipman Sword of Honour. He subsequently specialised in anti-submarine warfare where he was adjudged the Best All-round Officer of Long ASW course. He served as the ASWO onboard the Rajput-class destroyer INS Ranvijay (D55) and the Delhi-class destroyer INS Delhi (D61). He was the commissioning ASWO of the Talwar-class frigate INS Tabar (F44), the Project 1135.6 frigate built at Saint Petersburg, Russia in 2004. Nair attended the Defence Services Staff College, Wellington where he was awarded the Scudder Medal for standing first in merit and the Govindrajan award for best-spirited naval officer.

Nair, as CO INS Trikand, receiving the Unit Citation from CNS Adm Sunil Lanba.

He has commanded the Veer-class corvette INS Nashak (K83), the Khukri-class corvette INS Kirpan (P44) and the commanding officer of Talwar-class frigate INS Trikand (F51). Under his command, Trikand was awarded the Unit Citation and was adjudged the Best Ship of the Western Fleet in 2016-17. He was awarded the Vishisht Seva Medal on 26 January 2018.

As a Commodore, Nair served as the fleet operations officer (FOO) of the Western Fleet under Rear Admiral M. A. Hampiholi. He subsequently served as the Principal Director (Training) at the Indian Naval Academy, Ezhimala. He attended the 59th course of the National Defence College, New Delhi in 2019. He also served as the Commodore (Staff Requirements) at NHQ.

=== Flag rank ===
Defence Minister Rajnath Singh inaugurates the Chola Bhawan. CM of Goa Pramod Sawant, CNS Adm R. Hari Kumar and Nair also seen.

Nair was promoted to flag rank and appointed Assistant Chief of Personnel (Administration and Civilian) (ACOP A&C) at naval headquarters. The ACOP is an assistant principal staff officer role. He subsequently served as the Assistant Chief of the Naval Staff (Staff Requirements), also at NHQ. As ACNS (SR) and earlier as Commodore (SR), he steered disruptive changes in capability development processes and mechanisms, including creation of the Naval Innovation and Indigenisation Organisation (NIIO), the Technology Development Acceleration Cell (TDAC), conduct of Swavlamban Defence Technology seminar and extensive outreach and mentoring of defence start-ups amid COVID-19 pandemic challenges.

On 20 November 2023, he was appointed the 6th Commandant of Naval War College, Goa. He took over from Rear Admiral Rajesh Dhankhar. During his tenure, the 'Chola' Bhawan, the new home of the NWC, was inaugurated and dedicated to the nation by the Defence Minister Rajnath Singh. After a three-year tenure, he handed over to Rear Admiral M. M. Thomas and retired from the Navy on 31 October 2026.

== Awards and decorations ==

| Vishisht Seva Medal | Samanya Seva Medal | Operation Vijay Star | Operation Vijay Medal |
| Operation Parakram Medal | Sainya Seva Medal | Videsh Seva Medal | 75th Independence Anniversary Medal |
| 50th Independence Anniversary Medal | 30 Years Long Service Medal | 20 Years Long Service Medal | 9 Years Long Service Medal |

== See also ==
- Naval War College, Goa

Military offices
| Preceded by Rajesh Dhankhar | Commandant Naval War College, Goa; 2021 – 2022 | Incumbent |
