= S. Venkat Raman =

Indian Navy Admiral

Rear Admiral Sai Venkat Raman VSM
- Military career
- Allegiance: India
- Branch: Indian Navy
- Service years: 1990 – present
- Rank: Rear Admiral
- Commands: INS Tabar (F44)
- Awards: Vishisht Seva Medal

Rear Admiral Sai Venkat Raman, VSM is a serving Flag officer in the Indian Navy. He last served as the Flag Officer Commanding Tamil Nadu & Puducherry Naval Area. He earlier served as the Commandant of the Naval War College, Goa.

== Naval career ==
Raman was commissioned into the Indian Navy on 1 January 1990, after attending the National Defence Academy. He is a specialist in Communications and Electronic Warfare. He spent his early years onboard frontline warships as the communications officer. He attended the Defence Services Staff College, Wellington.

Raman commanded the Talwar-class stealth guided missile frigate INS Tabar (F44). He attended the Higher Defence Management Course at the College of Defence Management, Secunderabad. He served as the executive officer and the principal warfare officer of the lead ship of the aircraft carrier INS Viraat (R22).

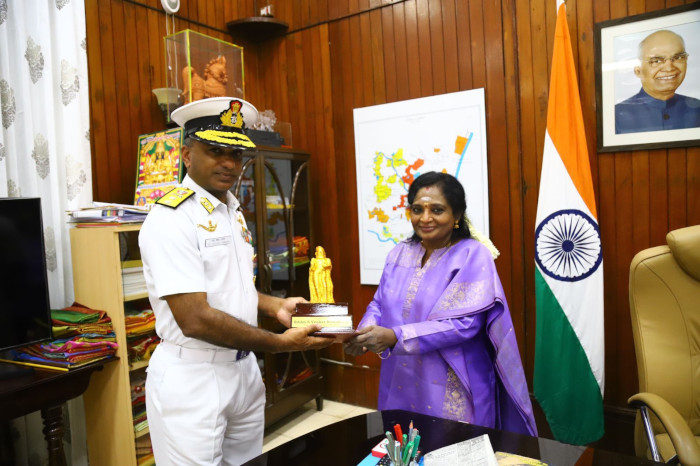
Raman with the Lieutenant Governor of Puducherry, Tamilisai Soundararajan.

Raman served as the Fleet Communications Officer of the Western Fleet. As a Commodore, he served as the head of the Directorate of Naval Intelligence. For his tenure as Principal Director Naval Intelligence, he was awarded the Vishisht Seva Medal on 26 January 2019.

=== Flag rank ===
Raman was promoted to flag rank in February 2021 and was appointed Commandant of the Naval War College, Goa (NWC). He took over as the 5th Commandant of the college, from Rear Admiral Sanjay Jasjit Singh. After a tenure of over a year as the Commandant of NWC, he was appointed Flag Officer Commanding Tamil Nadu & Puducherry Naval Area (FOTNA). He took over from Rear Admiral Puneet Chadha on 20 May 2022 at Chennai.

== Awards and decorations ==

Vishisht Seva Medal	Samanya Seva Medal	Special Service Medal	Operation Vijay Medal
Operation Parakram Medal	Sainya Seva Medal	Videsh Seva Medal	75th Independence Anniversary Medal
50th Independence Anniversary Medal	30 Years Long Service Medal	20 Years Long Service Medal	9 Years Long Service Medal

== See also ==
- Naval War College, Goa

Military offices
Preceded by Sanjay Jasjit Singh	Commandant Naval War College, Goa; 2021 – 2022	Succeeded by Rajesh Dhankhar
Preceded by Puneet Chadha	Flag Officer Commanding Tamil Nadu & Puducherry Naval Area; 2022 – 2023	Succeeded by Ravi Kumar Dhingra
