= USS L-8 =

L-class submarine of the United States

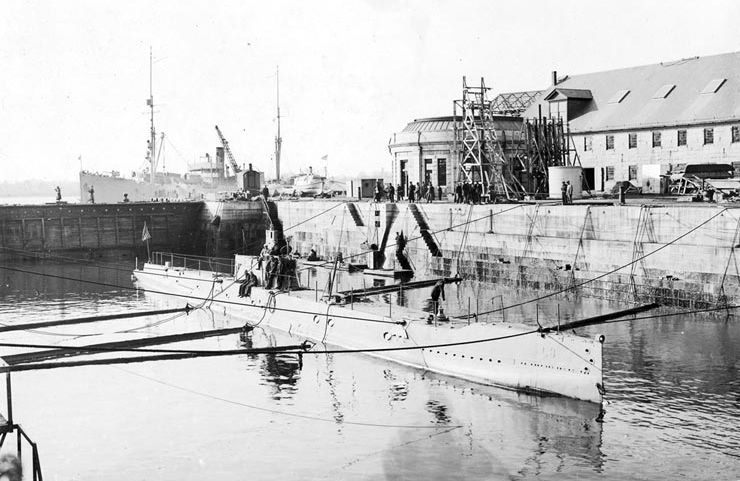
- USS L-8 in drydock at the New London Submarine Base, Groton, Connecticut, c. September 1917

History

United States
- Name: L-8
- Builder: Portsmouth Naval Shipyard, Kittery, Maine
- Cost: $572,730.42 (hull and machinery)
- Laid down: 24 February 1915
- Launched: 23 April 1917
- Sponsored by: Miss Nancy Gill
- Commissioned: 30 August 1917
- Decommissioned: 15 November 1922
- Stricken: 20 March 1925
- Identification: Hull symbol: SS-48 (17 July 1920); Call sign: NYU
- Fate: Sunk as target, 26 May 1926.

General characteristics
- Type: L-class submarine
- Displacement: 451 long tons (458 t) surfaced; 527 long tons (535 t) submerged
- Length: 165 ft (50 m)
- Beam: 14 ft 9 in (4.50 m)
- Draft: 13 ft 3 in (4.04 m)
- Installed power: 1,200 bhp (890 kW) (diesel); 800 hp (600 kW) (electric)
- Propulsion: 2 × Busch-Sulzer diesel engines; 2 × Diehl Manufacture Co. electric motors
- Speed: 14 kn (26 km/h; 16 mph) surfaced; 10.5 kn (19.4 km/h; 12.1 mph) submerged
- Range: 3,300 nmi (6,100 km; 3,800 mi) at 11 kn (20 km/h; 13 mph) surfaced; 150 nmi (280 km; 170 mi) at 5 kn (9.3 km/h; 5.8 mph) submerged
- Test depth: 200 ft (61.0 m)
- Complement: 2 officers; 26 enlisted
- Armament: 4 × 18 inch (450 mm) bow torpedo tubes (8 torpedoes); 1 × 3 in (76 mm)/23 caliber deck gun

USS L-8 (SS-48), also known as "Submarine No. 48", was an L-class submarine of the United States Navy. She patrolled off the East Coast before sailing for the Azores, during WWI. She transferred to the West Coast after the war where she worked with experimental torpedoes and underwater detection equipment, before being expended as a target.

== Design ==
The L-class boats designed by Lake Torpedo Boat (L-5 through L-8) were built to slightly different specifications from the other L boats, which were designed by Electric Boat, and are sometimes considered a separate L-5 class. The Lake boats had a length of 165 ft (50.3 m) overall, a beam of 14 ft 9 in (4.5 m), and a mean draft of 13 feet 3 inches (4.0 m). They displaced 451 long tons (458 t) on the surface and 527 long tons (535 t) submerged. The L-class submarines had a crew of two officers and 28 enlisted men. They had a diving depth of 200 ft (61.0 m).

For surface running, the boats were powered by two 600-brake-horsepower (447 kW) Busch-Sulzer diesel engines, each driving one propeller shaft. When submerged each propeller was driven by a 400-horsepower (298 kW) electric motor. They could reach 14 kn (26 km/h; 16 mph) on the surface and 10.5 kn (19.4 km/h; 12.1 mph) underwater. On the surface, the Lake boats had a range of 5,150 nmi (9,540 km; 5,930 mi), at 11 kn (20 km/h; 13 mph), and 150 nmi (280 km; 170 mi), at 5 kn (9.3 km/h; 5.8 mph), submerged.

The boats were armed with four 18-inch (450 mm) torpedo tubes in the bow. They carried four reloads, for a total of eight torpedoes. The L-class submarines were also armed with a single 3 in (76 mm)/23 caliber on a disappearing mount.

== Construction ==
L-8's keel was laid down on 24 February 1915, by the Portsmouth Navy Yard, in Kittery, Maine. L-8 was launched on 23 April 1917, sponsored by Miss Nancy Gill, and commissioned on 30 August 1917.

== Service history ==
Following training operations along the East Coast, L-8 prepared for European service. About this time, she teamed up with the decoy ship Charles Whittemore in hopes of luring a German U-boat to the surface. This effort, however, was not successful.

Departing Charleston, South Carolina, on 20 October 1917, the submarine steamed for the Azores, to join Submarine Division 6, for patrols against U-boats. She arrived in Bermuda, on 13 November, two days after the end of World War I, and was ordered to return to the United States.

After exercises and visits in Caribbean and Central American ports, and arrived San Pedro, California, on 13 February 1919, to join the submarine flotilla on the West Coast.

Remaining there from 1919 to 1922, she experimented with new torpedoes and undersea detection equipment. Following a period of commission, in ordinary, early in 1922, L-8 departed San Pedro, on 25 July, for the Atlantic, arriving Hampton Roads, Virginia, on 28 September. L-8 was decommissioned on 15 November 1922.

== Fate ==
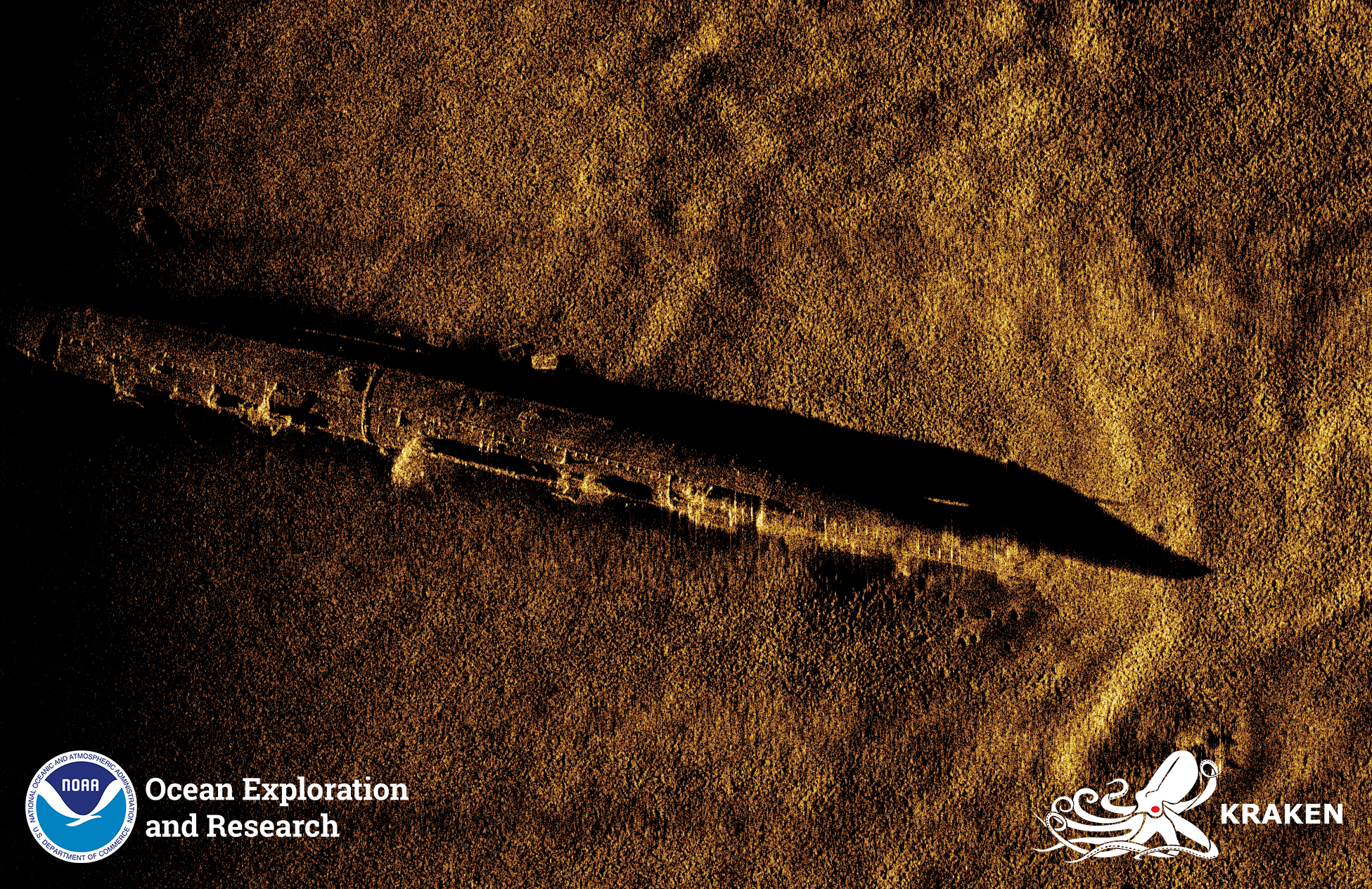
Synthetic aperture sonar imagery of the wreck of USS L-8.

Stricken from the Navy Register on 25 March 1925, ex-L-8 was expended as a target in magnetic influence torpedo exploder tests off Newport, Rhode Island, on 26 May 1926, the only such destructive test conducted in 19 years of pre-World War II magnetic influence torpedo exploder development.

== Bibliography ==
- "Table 21 - Ships on Navy List June 30, 1919". Congressional Serial Set. U.S. Government Printing Office: 767. 1921.
- Priolo, Gary. "L-8 (SS-48)". Navsource.net.
- Friedman, Norman (1995). U.S. Submarines Through 1945: An Illustrated Design History. Annapolis, Maryland: Naval Institute Press. ISBN 1-55750-263-3.
- Gardiner, Robert & Gray, Randal (1985). Conway's All the World's Fighting Ships 1906–1921. Annapolis, Maryland: Naval Institute Press. ISBN 0-85177-245-5.
- Cressman, Robert J. (10 May 2021). "L-8 (Submarine No. 48)". Dictionary of American Naval Fighting Ships. Navy Department, Naval History and Heritage Command. This article incorporates text from this source, which is in the public domain.
