= Naval Submarine Base Bangor =

US Navy submarine base in Washington state

- Near Bremerton, Washington in the United States
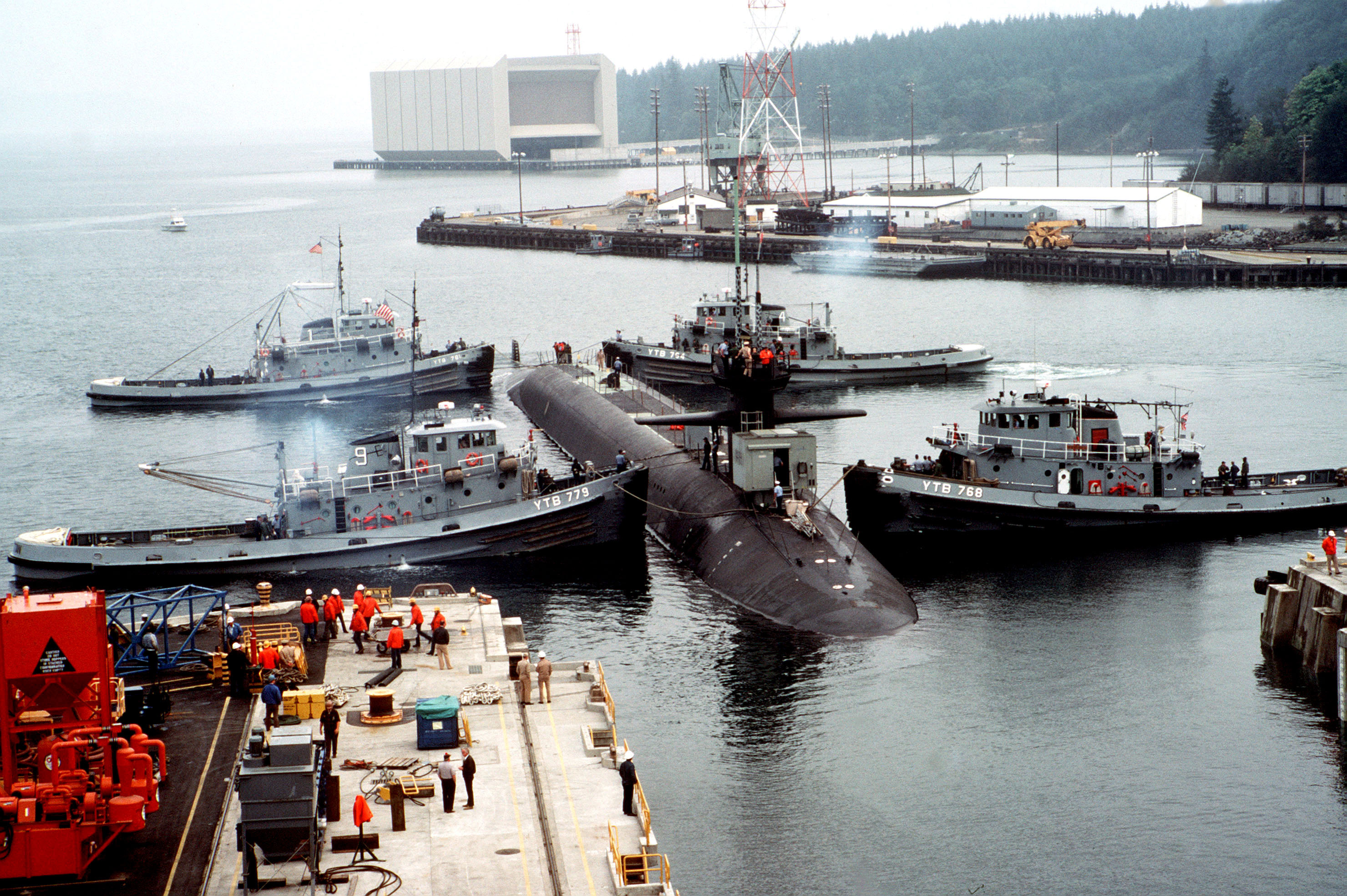
- Naval SB Bangor with tug Mishawaka (rear left) and three other Natick-class tugs guiding the USS Ohio (SSBN-726) out of dry dock at Delta Pier

Site information
- Type: Naval base
- Owner: Department of Defense
- Operator: US Navy

Location
- Coordinates: 47°43′27.84″N 122°43′12.17″W

Site history
- Built: 1942 (as Naval Support Base Bangor)
- In use: 1942–2004
- Fate: Merged in 2004 to become an element of Naval Base Kitsap

Naval Submarine Base Bangor is a former submarine base of the United States Navy that was merged with Naval Station Bremerton into Naval Base Kitsap in 2004.

== History ==
The Naval Support Base Bangor's naval history began in 1942 when it became a site for shipping ammunition to the Pacific Theater of Operations during World War II. For an expansion and to establish a permanent naval base, the U.S. Navy purchased 7,676 acres (3100 hectares) of land on the Hood Canal near the town of Bangor, Washington for approximately $18.7 million. The U.S. Naval ammunition magazine was established on June 5, 1944, for its construction, and it began operations in January 1945.

Beginning in World War II, and through the Korean War and the Vietnam War, until January 1973, the Bangor Annex continued its service as a U.S. Navy Ammunition Depot responsible for shipping conventional weapons abroad.

In 1973, the Navy announced the selection of the Bangor base as the home port for the first squadron of Ohio-class Trident Fleet Ballistic Missile submarines. On February 1, 1977, the Trident Submarine Base was officially activated. Naval Base Kitsap includes the Strategic Weapons Facility Pacific (SWFPAC) which provides maintenance, calibration, missile assembly/test, spare parts, and spare nuclear warhead storage for the UGM-133 Trident II submarine-launched ballistic missiles carried by the nuclear submarines.

In the 1970s and 1980s, the base was the site of a number of nonviolent direct action protests, including a guerrilla gardening action where activists planted a vegetable garden and sowed wheat on base land (1975) and a "Peace Blockade” (August 1982) which attempted to block the arrival of the USS Ohio (SSGN-726) nuclear-powered submarine.

This Trident submarine base is the sole one for the U.S. Pacific Fleet, with the Trident submarine base at Kings Bay, Georgia, for the U.S. Atlantic Fleet being the only other one.

The Marine Corps Security Forces Battalion Bangor has secured the ballistic missile submarines and associated infrastructure since before it was specifically designated a security unit, at company size, in October 1978.

== See also ==
- Maritime Force Protection Unit
- United States Navy submarine bases
- World War II United States Merchant Navy
