= Mishawaka (YTB-764) =

Tugboat of the United States Navy

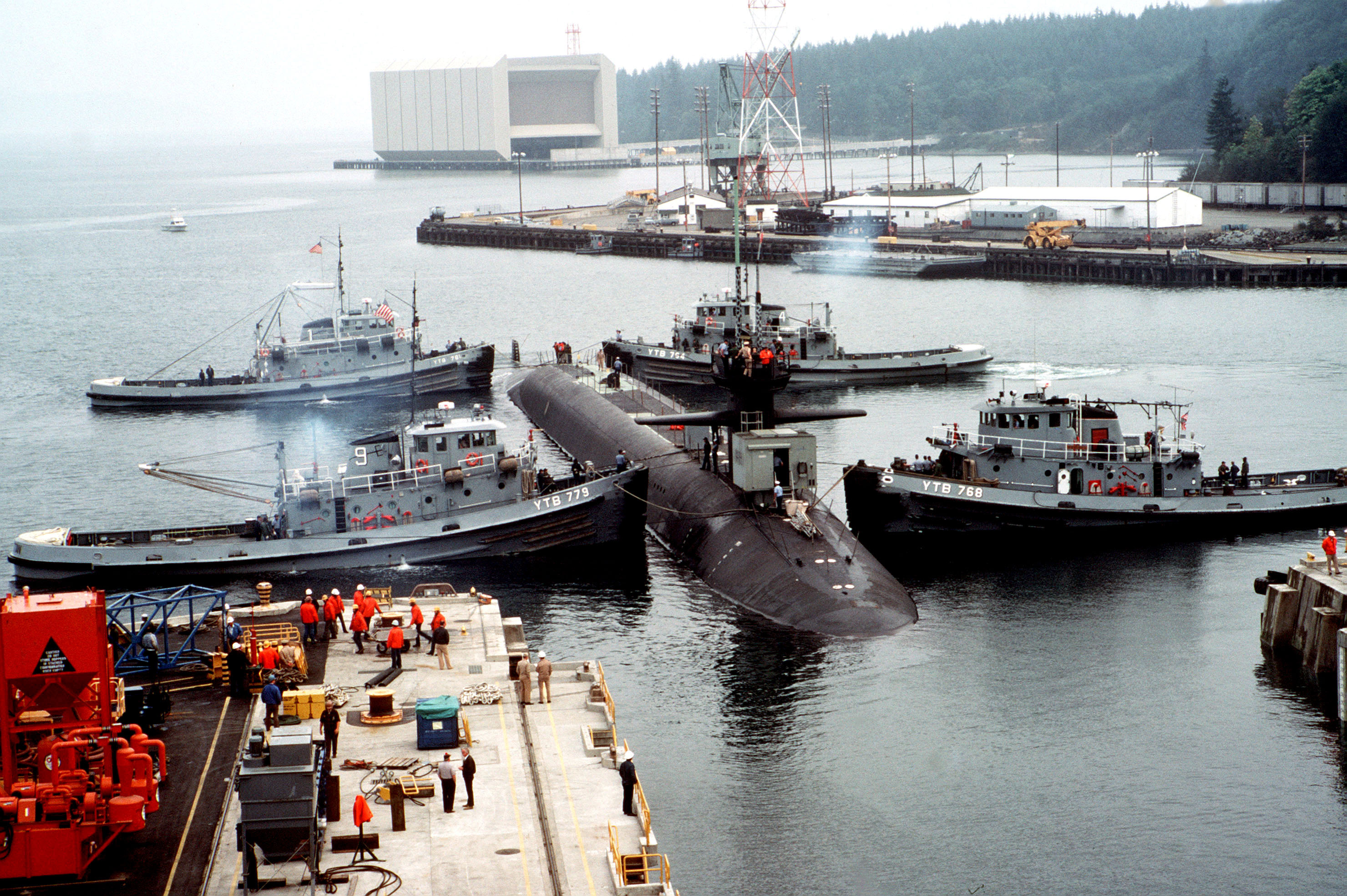
- Mishawaka (rear left) and three other Natick-class tugs guide USS Ohio (SSGN-726) out of dry dock at Delta Pier, Naval Submarine Base Bangor, Bangor, Washington.

History

United States
- Laid down: 1 February 1962
- Launched: 3 January 1963
- Completed: 19 April 1963
- In service: April 1963
- Stricken: 28 October 2002
- Identification: IMO number: 9094119
- Status: Awaiting disposal

General characteristics
- Class & type: Natick-class large harbor tug
- Displacement: 283 long tons (288 t) (light); 356 long tons (362 t) (full)
- Length: 109 ft (33 m)
- Beam: 31 ft (9.4 m)
- Draft: 14 ft (4.3 m)
- Propulsion: diesel, single screw
- Speed: 12 knots (14 mph; 22 km/h)
- Complement: 12

Mishawaka (YTB‑764) was a United States Navy Natick-class large harbor tug named for Mishawaka, Indiana.

== Construction ==
She was laid down on 1 February 1962 at Slidell, Louisiana, by Southern Shipbuilding Corporation and launched 3 January 1963.

== Operational history ==
She reported for duty in the 11th Naval District, headquartered at San Diego, in April 1963, where she remained into the 1980s.

Stricken from the Navy Directory 28 October 2002, ex-Mishawaka was sold by the Defense Reutilization and Marketing Service (DRMS) to JE Ventures LP, Nederland, Texas, for commercial service. Renamed Alois. In 2008, Alois was reported abandoned in Harlingen, Netherlands. At Harlingen, Alois was seized by court order and auctioned off by the International Transport Workers' Federation, for €400,000. In 2010 the ship was towed from Rotterdam to Port Arthur, TX, where she was berthed, awaiting sale by the bank.
