= INS Virbahu =

Coordinates: 17°41′58.9″N 83°16′14.3″E

- Virbahu
- Visakhapatnam, Andhra Pradesh

Site information
- Type: Naval station
- Controlled by: Indian Navy
- Condition: Operational

Site history
- Built: 19 May 1971
- In use: 1971-present

Garrison information
- Occupants: Eastern Naval Command

INS Virbahu is an Indian Navy submarine base of the Eastern Naval Command located near Visakhapatnam, Andhra Pradesh.

== History ==
INS Virbahu was commissioned as the shore support base for submarines on 19 May 1971. Initially, the 8th Submarine Squadron of Vela-class submarines was based here. The Commanding Officer INS Virbahu was also designated as the Captain Submarines, 8th Submarine Squadron. However, with the induction of the Sindhughosh class submarines, the 11th Submarine Squadron was established. As two Submarine Squadrons with eight submarines were based at Visakhapatnam, the scope of responsibility of the Commanding Officer, INS Virbahu, increased. The submarines were then placed under the control of Captain Submarines, 8th and 11th Submarine Squadron. With the increase of the number and type of submarines the operational authority of Submarine Squadrons was elevated from Captain Submarines to Commodore Submarines in April 1990. Since, the appointment of the Commodore Submarines had a command responsibility towards the submarines the appointment was thus re-christened as Commodore Commanding Submarines (East) in Jun 1997.

Though, all training, maintenance, operational and logistic matters pertaining to submarines were initially dealt by Virbahu, as the Submarine Arm expanded, the training role was taken over by INS Satavahana and the Class Authority functions by Submarine Headquarters. But the attachment to the old Alma Mater persists and Virbahu continues to be regarded as the 'Home of the Dolphins' even today.

== Objective ==
The role of INS Virbahu is to provide administrative and logistic support to the 8th and 11th Submarine Squadrons. It also provides accommodation, messing, welfare and recreational facilities to the crews of submarines. INS Virbahu is the seat of the Commodore Commanding Submarines (East) (COMCOS (W)). The COMCOS is also the commanding officer of the base.

== See also ==
Indian Navy

- Commodore Commanding Submarines (East)
- INS Vajrabahu
- List of Indian Navy bases
- List of active Indian Navy ships

Integrated commands and units

- Armed Forces Special Operations Division
- Defence Cyber Agency
- Integrated Defence Staff
- Integrated Space Cell
- Indian Nuclear Command Authority
- Indian Armed Forces
- Special Forces of India

Other lists

- Strategic Forces Command
- List of Indian Air Force stations
- List of Indian Navy bases
- India's overseas military bases
