= Naval War College, Goa =

Military academy of the Indian Navy

Naval War College
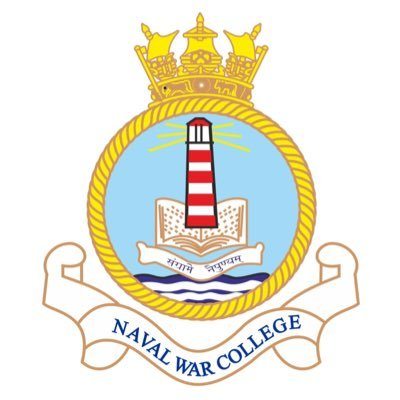
- Former name: College of Naval Warfare
- Motto: संग्रामॆ नैपुण्यम (Sanskrit)
- Motto in English: Perfection in War
- Type: War college
- Established: 1988
- Affiliations: University of Mumbai
- Commandant: Rear Admiral M. M. Thomas NM
- Location: Goa, India
- Website: Naval War College

The Naval War College (NWC) is a premier training institution of the Indian Navy, located in Goa. The college aims at developing leadership qualities of the officers of the Indian Armed Forces at the strategic and operational level. It is one of the three War Colleges of the Indian Armed Forces, Army War College, Mhow and College of Air Warfare, being the other two. The NWC operates under the Southern Naval Command, which is the training command of the Indian Navy.

== History ==
Defence Minister Rajnath Singh inaugurates the Chola Bhawan. CM of Goa Pramod Sawant, CNS Adm R. Hari Kumar and Commandant RAdm Arjun Dev Nair also seen.

The Naval War College was established on 17 September 1988 as the College of Naval Warfare at Karanja in Mumbai. The first Naval Higher Command Course began in 1988, while the first Technical Management Course commenced in 1994. By 2005, the Naval academy was to move from Goa to its new campus in Ezhimala. It was decided that CNW would move into the Naval Academy campus. On 18 August 2010, the CNW was renamed Naval War College and finally shifted to Goa in September 2011.

In March 2024, the college, under Rear Admiral Arjun Dev Nair, moved to its new home christened Chola Bhawan. Named after the Chola Empire, it was inaugurated by the Defence Minister Rajnath Singh and houses the Administrative & Training buildings of the college.

== Courses ==
The NWC conducts the following courses:

=== Naval Higher Command Course ===
This is the flagship course of NWC which runs for around 37 weeks. The course is attended by Indian Armed Forces Officers of the rank of Captain, Colonel and Group Captain.

=== Regional Maritime Security Course ===
The Regional Maritime Security Course is conducted over 8 weeks. The course is aimed at Officers of the rank of Colonel, Captain and Group Captain from the maritime security forces of Friendly Foreign Countries, like Bangladesh, Sri Lanka, Myanmar, Maldives, Oman, etc.

=== Technical Management Course ===
The Technical Management Course is a 22-week course conducted jointly by the NWC and Jamnalal Bajaj Institute of Management Studies, Mumbai. The course is attended by Naval officers of the rank of Commander.

== Accreditations and degrees ==
The participants of the Naval Higher Command Course receive a Master of Philosophy degree from the University of Mumbai, while the participants of the Technical Management Course receive the Postgraduate diploma from Jamnalal Bajaj Institute of Management Studies.

== Other events and programmes ==
The NWC conducts the Goa Maritime Conclave and Goa Maritime Symposium annually. These events are organised as a regional cooperation and diplomatic forum on maritime subjects. The NWC also has faculty exchange programmes with its counterparts in the United States, Japan, and Myanmar. The Commanders' Conclave is held at the NWC annually and is attended by the Chief of the Naval Staff and the Flag Officers Commanding-in-Chief Western Naval Command, Eastern Naval Command, Southern Naval Command and the Andaman and Nicobar Command.

== Leadership ==
=== Commandants ===
The College of Naval Warfare was headed by a director. The appointment was filled by a Commodore. The appointment was upgraded to two-star rank and re-designated Commandant Naval War College. Rear Admiral R. Hari Kumar, VSM was appointed the first Commandant on 30 January 2012.

The Commandant leads the Senior Directing Staff of the College, who function as the faculty and is assisted by the Deputy Commandant, held by a Commodore.

S.No.	Name	Assumed office	Left office	Notes
1	Rear Admiral R. Hari Kumar VSM	30 January 2012	30 January 2014	Later Chief of the Naval Staff.
2	Rear Admiral Monty Khanna AVSM, NM	30 January 2014	29 November 2017	
3	Rear Admiral Sandeep Beecha	29 November 2017	18 February 2020	Earlier Flag Officer Commanding Gujarat Naval Area.
4	Rear Admiral Sanjay Jasjit Singh AVSM, NM	18 February 2020	26 February 2021	Later Flag Officer Commanding-in-Chief Western Naval Command.
5	Rear Admiral S. Venkat Raman VSM	26 February 2021	23 May 2022	Later Flag Officer Commanding Tamil Nadu & Puducherry Naval Area.
6	Rear Admiral Rajesh Dhankhar NM	23 May 2022	9 November 2023	Current Deputy Chief of the Integrated Defence Staff (Doctrine, Organisation & Training).
7	Rear Admiral Arjun Dev Nair VSM	20 November 2023	31 October 2026	
8	Rear Admiral M. M. Thomas NM	1 November 2026	Present	Current Commandant.

=== Deputy Commandants ===
S.No.	Name	Assumed office	Left office	Notes
1	Commodore Srikant Kesnur	31 March 2012	5 July 2013	
2	Commodore K. G. Vishwanathan VSM	21 August 2013	24 March 2015	
3	Commodore V. R. Peshwae	25 March 2015	22 February 2016	
4	Commodore Shiv Tewari	23 February 2016	24 July 2016	
5	Commodore Ashok Rai	25 July 2016	26 May 2019	
6	Commodore Gurcharan Singh NM	16 July 2019	8 January 2021	Current Chief of Personnel.
7	Commodore Nitin Kapoor	9 January 2021	30 April 2023	
7	Commodore Prashant Chandrasekharan	1 May 2023	12 September 2025	
8	Commodore P. Sasi Kumar	13 September 2025	Present	

== See also ==
- Army War College, Mhow
- College of Air Warfare
- Indian National Defence University
- Military Academies in India
