= Shishumar-class submarine =

Diesel-electric attack submarines of the Indian Navy

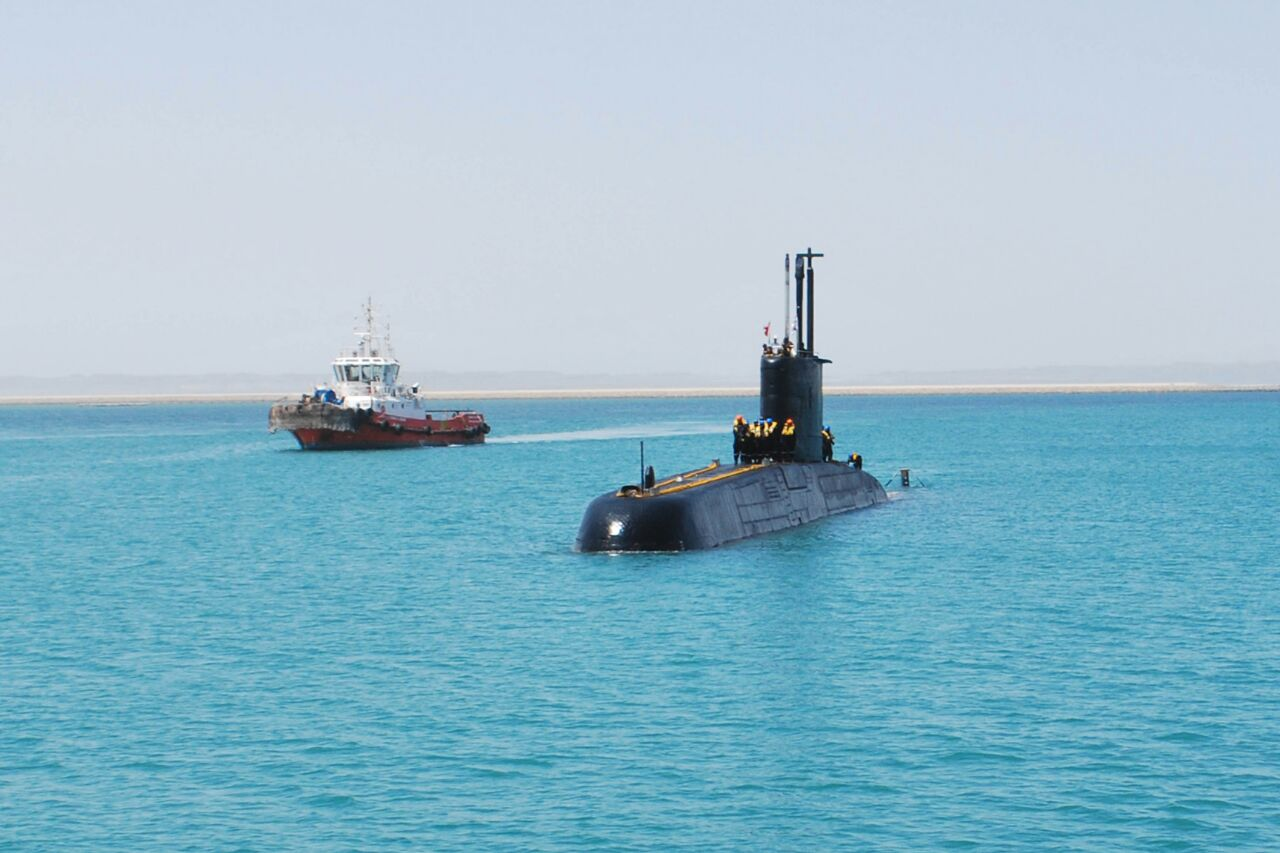
- INS Shishumar enters Port of Duqm, Oman.

Class overview
- Name: Shishumar class
- Builders: Howaldtswerke-Deutsche Werft; Mazagon Dock Limited
- Operators: Indian Navy
- Preceded by: Vela class
- Succeeded by: Kalvari class
- Cost: €300 million each
- In commission: 1986–present
- Planned: 6
- Completed: 4
- Cancelled: 2
- Active: 4

General characteristics
- Type: Attack submarine
- Displacement: 1,450 t (1,427 long tons) standard; 1,660 t (1,634 long tons) surfaced; 1,850 t (1,821 long tons) submerged
- Length: 64.4 m (211 ft 3 in)
- Beam: 6.5 m (21 ft 4 in)
- Draught: 6 m (19 ft 8 in)
- Propulsion: 4 × MTU 12V 493 AZ80 GA31L diesel-electric motors, 2,400 hp (1,790 kW) each; 1 × Siemens motor, 4,600 hp (3,430 kW); 4 × 1.8 MW Siemens alternators; 1 shaft
- Speed: 11 knots (20 km/h; 13 mph) surfaced; 22 knots (41 km/h; 25 mph) submerged
- Range: 8,000 nmi (15,000 km; 9,200 mi) at 8 kn (15 km/h; 9.2 mph); 13,000 nmi (24,000 km; 15,000 mi) at 10 kn (19 km/h; 12 mph)
- Complement: 40 (8 officers)
- Sensors & processing systems: Atlas Elektronik CSU 83 sonar; Thomson Sintra DUUX-5 passive sonar; Thomson-CSF Calypso surface search radar
- Electronic warfare & decoys: Argo Phoenix II AR 700 or Kollmorgen Sea Sentry; C 303 acoustic decoys
- Armament: 14 × AEG-SUT Mod-1 torpedoes; 24 × external strap-on mines; UGM-84L Harpoon Block II missiles (S46 and S47 only)

The Shishumar-class submarines (lit. 'Dolphin') are diesel-electric attack submarines, currently in active service with the Indian Navy. These submarines are an Indian variant of the Type 209 submarines developed by the German yard Howaldtswerke-Deutsche Werft under the internal designation "Type 1500". The first two vessels were built by HDW at Kiel, Germany, while the remainder were built by Mazagon Dock Limited, at Mumbai, India, under a technology transfer agreement. The submarines were commissioned between 1986 and 1994. These submarines have a displacement of 1,660 tons when surfaced, a speed of 22 knots (41 km/h; 25 mph), and a complement of 40 including eight officers.

The Shishumar class is unique among Type 209s for having an IKL-designed integrated escape sphere. The sphere has accommodations for the entire crew with an eight-hour air supply.

The submarines form the 10th Submarine Squadron at INS Vajrabahu, Mumbai.

== History ==
India signed the agreement for these submarines with Howaldtswerke-Deutsche Werft (HDW) on 11 December 1981. The agreement called for building of two submarines in West Germany, the supply of knocked-down kits for assembling two more submarines in Mazagon Dock Limited (MDL), and training for construction and logistics services. An agreement was announced in 1984 for the construction of two additional submarines in MDL, but was subsequently cancelled due to economic crisis in the late 1980s. The four submarines that were finally built form the 10th submarine squadron based at Mumbai.

=== Timeline ===
- February 1979: The Cabinet Committee on Political Affairs (CCPA) — the apex body for approval of all international contracts under the then Prime Minister of India Morarji Desai — approved the Indian Navy's programme to acquire four hunter-killer submarines (SSKs) capable of diving to a depth of 350 m (1,150 ft). The acquisition, worth ₹350 crore (equivalent to ₹90 billion or US$940 million in 2023), would include the technology transfer for their indigenous co-production.
- February 1979: Four offers were shortlisted by a nine-member negotiating committee, led by Additional Secretary of Defence M. K. Mukherjee. The four firms selected were Sweden's Kockums, West Germany's HDW, Italy's Sauro and the TNSW-1400.
- March 1979: The then Vice Chief of the Naval Staff, Vice Admiral Swaraj Parkash, appointed a six-member expert committee. The chief of the committee was Rear Admiral S. L. Sethi and also included Captain M. Kondath, the then Director (Submarines).
- 16 May 1979: The six-member Sethi committee submitted its report to the Vice Chief of the Naval Staff. The Swedish 45-Kockums followed by the Italian Sauro submarine were the first and second preference of the committee, respectively. The HDW's submarine offer was rejected as it had a maximum diving depth of 250 m (820 ft) against the Navy's depth requirement of 350 m (1,150 ft).
- 15 June 1979: HDW was put back on list by the committee given that they would improve the submarine's design to meet the Navy requirements.
- Late June 1979: A delegation of officials from various ministries, led by Rear Admiral D. S. Painthal and including Captain Kondath, visited several shipyards across Europe and the United States to assess available options. The delegation concluded that the Kockums design was the best fit for the Indian Navy.
- July 1979: There were significant changes in the Indian politics including the collapse of Desai ministry, which led to changes in the CCPA composition. Meanwhile, the Defence Ministry had prepared a draft paper for the CCPA, identifying the Kockums design as the best option at a cost of ₹318.79 crore (equivalent to ₹82 billion or US$850 million in 2023), compared to the more expensive HDW which would cost ₹336.81 crore (equivalent to ₹87 billion or US$900 million in 2023). The paper also recommended reconstituting the negotiating team to enable a quick and final decision. However, due to the prevailing political uncertainty, the CCPA was unable to convene.
- Early 1980: The competitors extended their offers until 30 June 1980. The Ministry of Defence kept forwarding their proposal where Kockums and HDW was shortlisted and it was recommended that the committee be headed by the Secretary (Defence Production).
- 10 April 1980: The CCPA met under the new Prime Minister Indira Gandhi where the shortlisting was approved. However, the reconstitution of the committee was agreed to be decided upon by the Prime Minister.
- 14 April 1980: The original committee met again but was presided over by the then newly appointed Additional Secretary Shivinder Singh Sidhu. There were neither any written directives from the Prime Minister's Office (PMO) nor any official records found as to how Sidhu replaced the Secretary of Defence in the committee. During the meeting, he claimed that the CCPA had asked to constitute a new seven-member committee chaired by himself. However, there were reportedly no records for such a statement. Other members of the committee included B. M. Menon [Financial Adviser (Defence Services)], S. K. Banerjee (Solicitor, Ministry of Law), Vice Admiral M. R. Schunker, Lt General S .G. Payara [Chief Co-ordinator (R&D)], Joint Secretary D. N. Prashad and Vice Admiral N. R. Dutta (the then chief of the Mazagon Docks).
- May 1980: Sidhu committee toured Germany and Sweden.
- 17 May 1980: The committee held a formal meeting and switched its decision to HDW from the initial Kockums, citing the Kockums cost to be ₹403 crore (equivalent to ₹93 billion or US$970 million in 2023) against HDW's ₹332 crore (equivalent to ₹77 billion or US$800 million in 2023)
- 30 June 1980: The CCPA convened a meeting and approved the committee's proposal though it directed them to hold further negotiations. Following this, Sidhu was temporarily replaced by S. K. Bhatnagar, who chaired further meetings for all purposes and set the stage for the deal.
- July 1980: Sanction was accorded for the acquisition of two Type 1500 submarines from HDW< West Germany and the indigenous contstruction of two more at the Mazagon Docks Limited (MDL.
- 11 December 1981: The contract was signed for four HDW submarines, along with torpedoes, at a cost of ₹465 crore (equivalent to ₹95 billion or US$990 million in 2023). The submarines were to be delivered by 1987 following which another deal for further two boats could be placed.
- November 1985: The government sanctioned to execute the option acquisition of two additional Type 1500 submarines. However, the proposal was dismissed in June 1989 due to the alleged transfer of illegal commissions from HDW to government officials.

=== Corruption charges ===
By mid-1987, only two submarines were delivered. Meanwhile, the then Defence Minister V. P. Singh, under the Rajiv Gandhi Ministry, he was informed that the Germans might have overcharged India and attempted so that the next batch of two submarines could be priced correctly. However, things took a turn when J. C. Ajmani, the Indian ambassador to Bonn, telegrammed the Defence Minister on 24 February 1987 that the Gernans alleged that the price could not be reduced since the contract included 7% commissions.

V. P. Singh first saw this message in April and ordered an immediate inquiry in 9 April. On 12 April, Singh resigned from the ministry. In May 1990, the Central Bureau of Investigation (CBI) filed a First Information Report (FIR) in a New Delhi court identifying seven persons as principal conspirators in a criminal plot to award the contract to HDW, including S. K. Bhatnagar, former Defence Secretary; S. S. Sidhu, former Additional Secretary of Defence and the then secretary-general, International Civil Aviation Organization (ICAO); Captain M. Kondath, former Director (Submarines); B. S. Ramaswamy, former financial adviser to the Defence Ministry; Directors and agents of HDW; Directors and agents of AEG-T West Germany (torpedo supplier) and Directors of Ferrostaal. The charges included the failure of Indian Civil Servants to stand against HDW during negotiations and their acquiescence to its unrealistic financial demands, incorrect calculation of the HDW deal cost by Defence Ministry officials, manipulations to various technical and financial parameters of the HDW offer by senior officials and the members of the committee so as to rank HDW first against its earlier second preference and the change of price quotations by HDW, AEG-T and Ferrostaal without informing the government. The payments spanned between 1982 and mid-1988.

S. S. Sidhu was the prime accused as per the CBI investigation. Allegations registered against him ranged from manipulation of techno-commercial data as well as declaring himself chairman of negotiating committee without documentation which was accepted as a fait accompli and misinforming the CCPA about the Germans willing to sign a memorandum of understanding on transfer of technology. The Germans under the norms of NATO security compulsions were not meant to transfer the technology and they ultimately did not do so.

S. K. Bhatnagar had taken over Sidhu as the Additional Secretary of Defence and was responsible for finalising the deal. He reportedly dismissed the suggestions of the committee members to reopen the deal process before CCPA in due to the altered technical and financial details. He also ignored the then Vice Admiral M. R. Schunker's appeal during the meeting of 18 October 1980 about the technical specifications of HDW being unacceptable to the Navy. Schunker also stated during a meeting in November that the capabilities of the torpedo to be supplied by AEG-T could not be evaluated since classified data were not disclosed by the German Government. However, the appeal was also ignored by Bhatnagar.

Captain M. Kondath, a key official in the SSK project, allegedly manipulated figures in favour of HDW while serving as Director (Submarine Armament). Accused of inflating Kockums' cost and seeking post-retirement employment with HDW, he applied for premature retirement soon after the deal's approval. Though denied permission to join HDW, he continued liaising with its associates and later joined Ferrostaal. Meanwhile, financial adviser B.S. Ramaswamy allegedly inflated Kockums' cost by misapplying escalation to fixed components, making HDW appear cheaper. Both the CBI and PAC later found Kockums was actually less expensive, contradicting Ramaswamy's calculations used to justify the HDW deal.

=== Mid Life Upgrades and Service history ===
The Indian Navy awarded a $151 million contract for mid-life upgrade and certification of INS Shishumar in 2018. The refit was carried out by MDL at Mumbai with technical cooperation from ThyssenKrupp Marine Systems. The refit was planned to be completed by 2021 with a similar upgrade for another vessel of Shishumar-class submarine to follow. The ship was expected to be delivered by 2021 but owing to COVID-19 delays the ship will now be delivered to the Indian Navy in August 2023.

Similarly, a second mid-life upgrade contract was awarded to the Mazagon Dock for refit and life certification of the second submarine Shankush on 30 June 2023. The completion date of mid-life upgrade and certification is 2026. The total estimated cost to be around ₹2,725 crore (US$280 million).

Total three ships out of four will undergo mid-life refit and certification, this will extend the life of the submarine by 10–15 years.

One of the submarine participated in Exercise Malabar 2024 which was held from 8 to 18 October.

Two of these submarines were deployed alongside INS Vikrant along with seven frontline warships and four submarines (Kalvari class and Sindhughosh class) on 7 November 2024. The operations included carrier operations of MiG-29K, missile firing drills, submarine manoeuvres and flypasts by 30 aircraft demonstrated to the President of India Droupadi Murmu who was present on board INS Vikrant.

== Ships of the class ==
Name	Pennant	Builder	Laid down	Launched	Commissioned	Upgrade	Note
Indian Navy
Shishumar	S44	Howaldtswerke-Deutsche Werft	1 May 1982	13 December 1984	22 September 1986	2018 — 2023	
Shankush	S45	Howaldtswerke-Deutsche Werft	1 September 1982	11 May 1984	20 November 1986	2023 — 2026	
Shalki	S46	Mazagon Dock	5 June 1984	30 September 1989	7 February 1992	—N/a	
Shankul	S47	Mazagon Dock	3 September 1989	21 March 1992	28 May 1994	—N/a	

== See also ==
- List of submarine classes in service

Equivalent submarines of the same era

- Västergötland class
- Ula class
- Jang Bogo class
