= INS Shishumar =

1984 Shishumar-class submarine

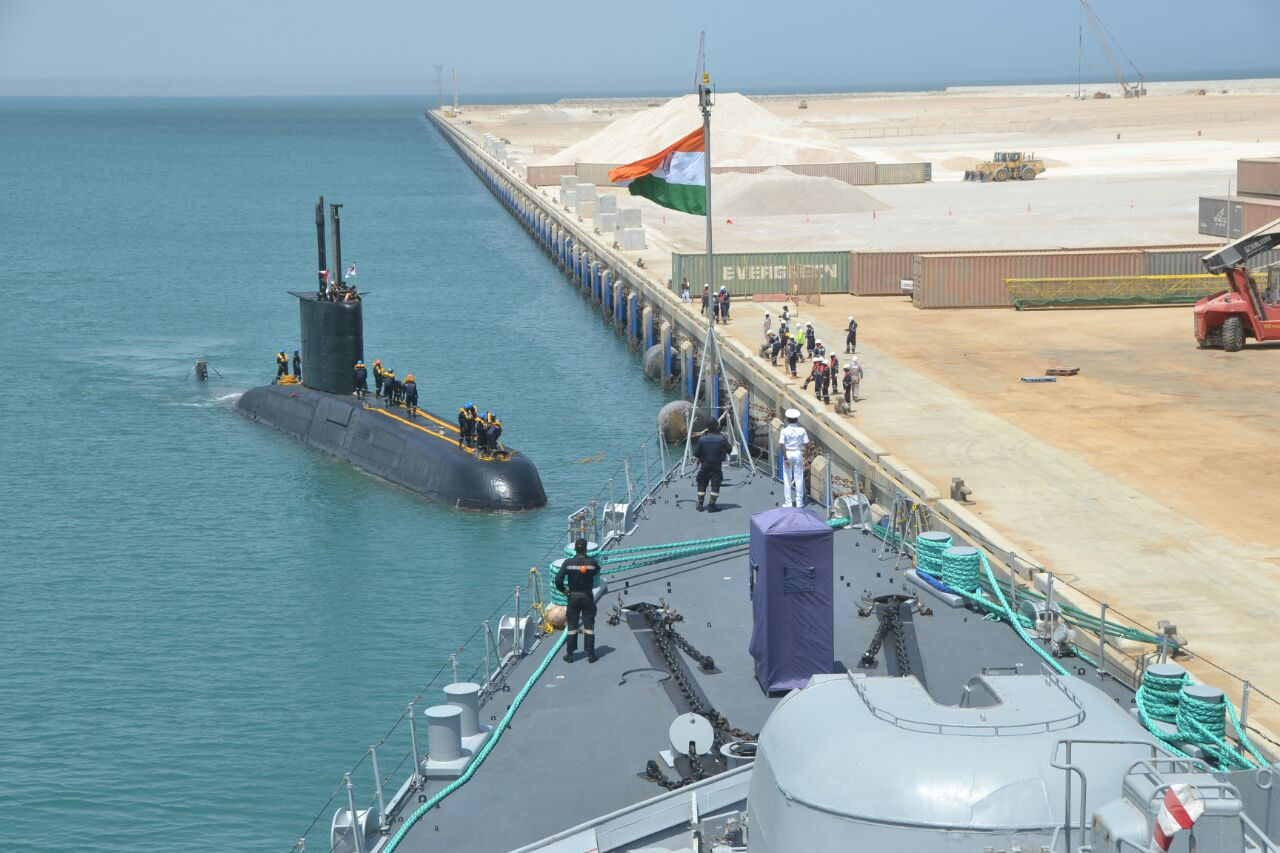
- INS Shishumar at Port of Duqm, Oman.

History

India
- Name: INS Shishumar
- Namesake: Ganges river dolphin
- Builder: Howaldtswerke-Deutsche Werft, Kiel, Germany
- Launched: 13 December 1984
- Commissioned: 22 September 1986
- Status: in active service

General characteristics
- Class & type: Shishumar-class submarine
- Displacement: 1450 tons surfaced; 1850 tons submerged
- Length: 64.4 m (211 ft)
- Beam: 6.5 m (21 ft)
- Draught: 6 m (20 ft)
- Propulsion: 4 × 2,400 hp (1,800 kW) diesel-electric motors; 1 × Siemens 4,600 hp (3,400 kW) motor; 4 × 1.8 MW (2,400 hp) Siemens alternators; 1 shaft
- Speed: Surfaced 11 knots (20 km/h); Submerged 22 knots (41 km/h)
- Range: Snorting 8,000 nautical miles (15,000 km) at 8 kn (15 km/h)
- Test depth: Test depth 260 m (850 ft)
- Complement: 40 (incl 8 officers)
- Armament: 14 × AEG-SUT Mod 1 wire-guided active/passive torpedoes; 24 × external strap-on mines

INS Shishumar (S44) (lit. 'Dolphin') is the lead vessel of the Shishumar class of diesel-electric submarines of the Indian Navy. She was commissioned on 22 September 1986 under Commander P M Bhate.

== Mid Life Upgrade ==
Indian Navy awarded $151 million contract for mid-life upgrade and certification of INS Shishumar, the refit will be carried out by Mazagon Dock, Mumbai with technical cooperation from ThyssenKrupp Marine Systems.

The refit is planned to be completed by 2021 with a similar upgrade for another vessel of Shishumar class to follow.
