= INS Vela (S40) =

History

India
- Name: INS Vela
- Namesake: Vela (Stingray)
- Launched: 28 January 1972
- Commissioned: 31 August 1973
- Decommissioned: 25 June 2010

General characteristics
- Class & type: Vela-class submarine
- Displacement: 1,952 t (1,921 long tons) surfaced; 2,475 t (2,436 long tons) submerged
- Length: 91.3 m (299 ft 6 in)
- Beam: 7.5 m (24 ft 7 in)
- Draught: 6 m (19 ft 8 in)
- Speed: 16 knots (30 km/h; 18 mph) surfaced; 15 knots (28 km/h; 17 mph) submerged
- Range: 20,000 mi (32,000 km) at 8 kn (15 km/h; 9.2 mph) surfaced; 380 mi (610 km) at 10 kn (19 km/h; 12 mph) submerged
- Test depth: 250 m (820 ft)
- Complement: 75 (incl 8 officers)
- Armament: 10 x 533 mm (21 in) torpedo tubes with 22 SET-65E/SAET-60 torpedoes; 44 mines in lieu of torpedoes

INS Vela (S40) was the lead ship of four diesel-electric Vela-class submarines of the Indian Navy. The submarine was commissioned on 31 August 1973 in Riga, Latvian SSR. Along with her sister ship Vagli, she spent almost 10 years undergoing a protracted refit by Hindustan Shipyard. After 37 years of service, the submarine was decommissioned on 25 June 2010. The submarine was claimed by the Eastern Naval Command to be the oldest operational submarine in the world at the time of her decommissioning.

Vela is the name of an Indian fish from the stingray species known for its aggression and offensive power, and the ability to camouflage itself from predators.
