= INS Shankush =

1984 Shishumar-class submarine

History

India
- Name: INS Shankush
- Builder: Howaldtswerke-Deutsche Werft, Kiel, Germany
- Launched: 11 May 1984
- Commissioned: 20 November 1986
- Status: Active

General characteristics
- Class & type: Shishumar-class submarine
- Displacement: 1450 tons surfaced; 1850 tons submerged
- Length: 64.4 m (211 ft)
- Beam: 6.5 m (21 ft)
- Draught: 6 m (20 ft)
- Propulsion: 4 × 2,400 hp (1,800 kW) diesel-electric motors; 1 × Siemens 4,600 hp (3,400 kW) motor; 4 × 1.8 MW (2,400 hp) Siemens alternators; 1 shaft
- Speed: Surfaced 11 knots (20 km/h); Submerged 22 knots (41 km/h)
- Range: Snorting 8,000 nautical miles (15,000 km) at 8 kn (15 km/h)
- Test depth: Test depth 260 m (850 ft)
- Complement: 40 (incl 8 officers)
- Armament: 14 × AEG-SUT Mod 1 wire-guided active/passive torpedoes; 24 × external strap-on mines

INS Shankush (S45) (lit. 'Ray of Light') is a Shishumar-class diesel-electric submarine of the Indian Navy.

== Mid Life Upgrade ==
Indian Navy awarded a contract for mid-life upgrade and certification of Shankush on 30 June 2023, the refit will be carried out by Mazagon Dock, Mumbai with technical cooperation from ThyssenKrupp Marine Systems.

The refit is planned to be completed by 2026 and the total cost associated is ₹2,725 crore (equivalent to ₹30 billion or US$310 million in 2026).
