= INS Vagli =

Indian submarine

History

India
- Name: INS Vagli
- Launched: 19 April 1973
- Commissioned: 10 August 1974
- Decommissioned: 9 December 2010

General characteristics
- Class & type: Vela-class submarine
- Displacement: 1,952 t (1,921 long tons) surfaced; 2,475 t (2,436 long tons) submerged
- Length: 91.3 m (299 ft 6 in)
- Beam: 7.5 m (24 ft 7 in)
- Draught: 6 m (19 ft 8 in)
- Speed: 16 knots (30 km/h; 18 mph) surfaced; 15 knots (28 km/h; 17 mph) submerged
- Range: 20,000 mi (32,000 km) at 8 kn (15 km/h; 9.2 mph) surfaced; 380 mi (610 km) at 10 kn (19 km/h; 12 mph) submerged
- Test depth: 250 m (820 ft)
- Complement: 75 (incl 8 officers)
- Armament: 10 x 533 mm (21 in) torpedo tubes with 22 SET-65E/SAET-60 torpedoes; 44 mines in lieu of torpedoes

INS Vagli (S42) was a Vela-class diesel-electric submarine of the Indian Navy, commissioned in 1974. Along with her sister ship Vela, she spent almost 10 years undergoing a protracted refit by Hindustan Shipyard. After 36 years of active service, INS Vagli was decommissioned on 9 December 2010.

== Submarine museum proposal ==
It has been proposed to convert INS Vagli into a museum like her sister ship INS Kursura. The ship was brought to the Chennai Harbour on 25th March 2013 and later moved to Mammalapuram on April 6. and was handed over to the state for conversion into a maritime heritage museum based near Mamallapuram. Tradex ltd received a work order to tow the submarine to Mahabalipuram in April 2013 using air bags and flotation collars, against the opinion of the Indian Maritime University. Despite this several attempts were made from April 6 to 24th to beach the submarine. Facing strong underwater currents and high tide, the towing agency gave up and the submarine was brought back to chennai on April 30th. The whole mishap costed close to ₹4.41 crore (equivalent to ₹7.7 crore or US$800,000 in 2026).

However, following various contractual setbacks, the process did not come to fruition and the submarine was towed to a vacant berth at the Chennai port in June 2014. The ship is still maintained by dock officials, though its condition continues to deteriorate. TTDC was incurring a monthly expenditure of Rs 3.20 lakh towards recurring charges of port charges, insurance and husbandry charges for berthing the submarine at the Chennai port. The submarine is presumed to have been sold to a shipbreakers in 2021 following a long and lengthy court trail.
