= INS Vagir (S41) =

History

India
- Name: INS Vagir
- Namesake: Vagir (Sandfish)
- Builder: Sudomekh, Admiralty Shipyard
- Launched: 7 July 1972
- Commissioned: 3 November 1973
- Decommissioned: 7 June 2001
- Fate: Decommissioned

General characteristics
- Class & type: Vela-class submarine
- Displacement: 1,952 t (1,921 long tons) surfaced; 2,475 t (2,436 long tons) submerged
- Length: 91.3 m (299 ft 6 in)
- Beam: 7.5 m (24 ft 7 in)
- Draught: 6 m (19 ft 8 in)
- Speed: 16 knots (30 km/h; 18 mph) surfaced; 15 knots (28 km/h; 17 mph) submerged
- Range: 20,000 mi (32,000 km) at 8 kn (15 km/h; 9.2 mph) surfaced; 380 mi (610 km) at 10 kn (19 km/h; 12 mph) submerged
- Test depth: 250 m (820 ft)
- Complement: 75 (incl 8 officers)
- Armament: 10 x 533 mm (21 in) torpedo tubes with 22 SET-65E/SAET-60 torpedoes; 44 mines in lieu of torpedoes

INS Vagir (S41) was a Vela-class diesel-electric submarine of the Indian Navy.

Vagir was named after a species of sandfish.
