= Vela-class submarine =

Indian Navy ship class (1973–2010)

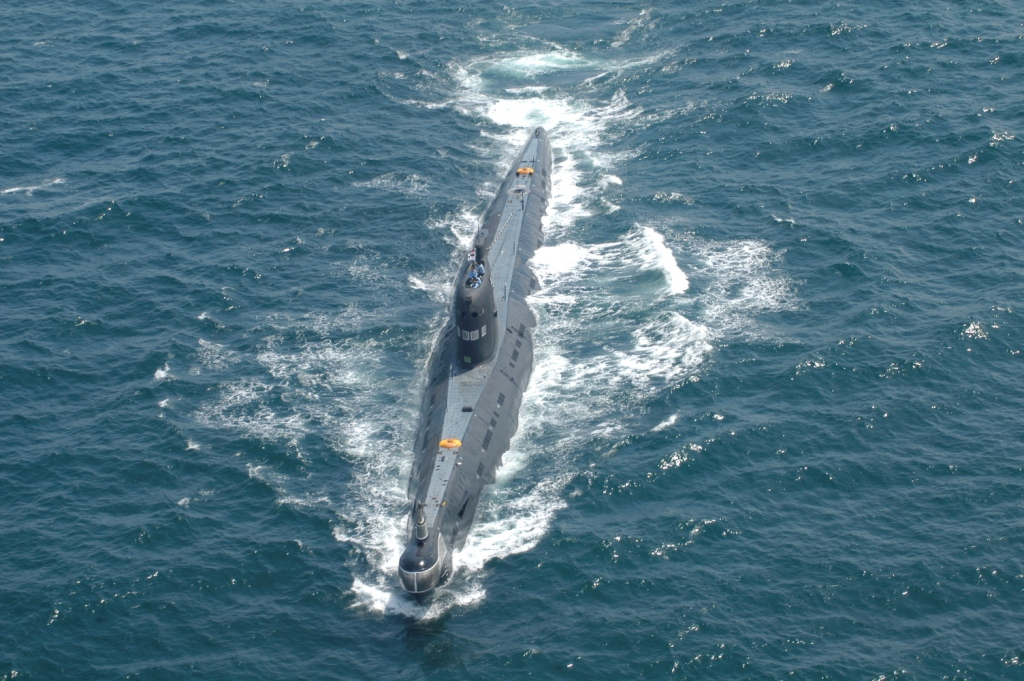
- A variant of the Foxtrot-class submarine of the Indian Navy

Class overview
- Name: Vela class
- Builders: Sudomekh, Admiralty Shipyard
- Operators: Indian Navy
- Preceded by: Kalvari class
- Succeeded by: Sindhughosh class; Shishumar class
- In commission: 1973–2010
- Planned: 4
- Completed: 4
- Retired: 4

General characteristics
- Type: Submarine
- Displacement: 1,952 t (1,921 long tons) surfaced; 2,475 t (2,436 long tons) submerged
- Length: 91.3 m (299 ft 6 in)
- Beam: 7.5 m (24 ft 7 in)
- Draught: 6 m (19 ft 8 in)
- Speed: 16 knots (30 km/h; 18 mph) surfaced; 15 knots (28 km/h; 17 mph) submerged
- Range: 20,000 mi (32,000 km) at 8 knots (15 km/h; 9.2 mph) surfaced; 380 mi (610 km) at 10 knots (19 km/h; 12 mph) submerged
- Test depth: 250 m (820 ft)
- Complement: 75 (incl 8 officers)
- Sensors & processing systems: Panchendriya sonar
- Armament: 10 533mm torpedo tubes with 22 SET-65E/SAET-60 torpedoes; 44 mines in lieu of torpedoes

Vela-class submarines of the Indian Navy were variants of the later Soviet Foxtrot-class submarines. The last of the class was decommissioned from the Indian Navy in December 2010. The submarines formed the 8th Submarine Squadron and were based at INS Virbahu.

INS Vagli is planned to be preserved as a museum in Tamil Nadu, though the process has been plagued with issues and is currently on hold.

== Ships of the class ==
Name	Pennant	Builder	Commissioned	Decommissioned	Status
INS Vela	S40	Sudomekh	31 August 1973	25 June 2010	
INS Vagir	S41	Sudomekh	3 November 1973	7 June 2001	
INS Vagli	S42	Sudomekh	10 August 1974	9 December 2010	To be preserved as a museum
INS Vagsheer	S43	Sudomekh	26 December 1974	30 April 1997	

== See also ==
Equivalent submarines of the same era

- Yūshio class
- Zwaardvis class
- Tango class
- Type 035A
