= INS Kalvari (S21) =

Kalvari-class submarine of the Indian Navy

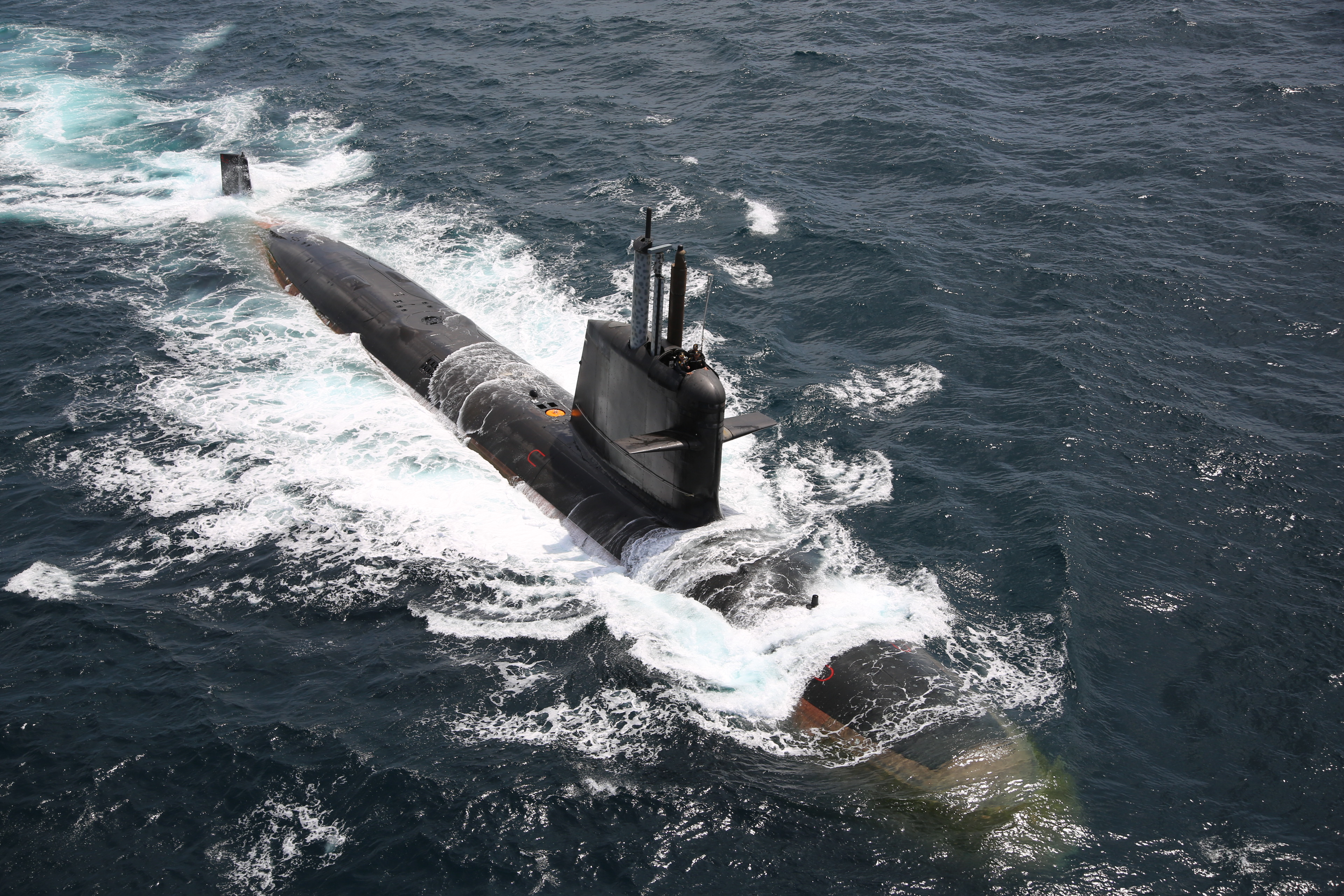
- INS Kalvari (S21) at sea

History

India
- Name: Kalvari
- Namesake: Kalvari (S23)
- Ordered: 2005
- Builder: Mazagon Dock Limited, Mumbai
- Launched: 27 October 2015
- Acquired: 2 December 2017
- Commissioned: 14 December 2017
- Identification: S21
- Motto: Ever Onward
- Status: in active service
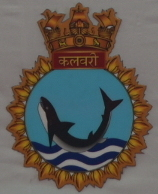
- Badge

General characteristics
- Class & type: Kalvari-class submarine
- Displacement: Surfaced: 1,615 tonnes (1,780 short tons); Submerged: 1,775 tonnes (1,957 short tons)
- Length: 67.5 m (221 ft)
- Beam: 6.2 m (20 ft)
- Height: 12.3 m (40 ft)
- Draught: 5.8 m (19 ft)
- Propulsion: 4 x MTU 12V 396 SE84 diesel engines; 360 x battery cells; DRDO PAFC Fuel Cell AIP (To be added in mid-life refit)
- Speed: Surfaced: 11 kn (20 km/h); Submerged: 20 kn (37 km/h)
- Range: 6,500 nmi (12,000 km) at 8 kn (15 km/h) (surfaced); 550 nmi (1,020 km) at 4 kn (7.4 km/h) (submerged)
- Endurance: 50 days
- Test depth: 350 metres (1,150 ft)
- Complement: 8 officers; 35 sailors
- Electronic warfare & decoys: C303/S anti-torpedo countermeasure system
- Armament: 6 x 533 mm (21 in) torpedo tubes for 18 SUT torpedoes OR; SM.39 Exocet anti-ship missiles; 30 mines in place of torpedoes

INS Kalvari (S21) (lit. 'Tiger shark') is the first of the six indigenous Kalvari-class submarines currently in service with the Indian Navy. It is a diesel-electric attack submarine, designed by DCNS (French naval defence and energy company) and was manufactured at Mazagon Dock Limited in Mumbai.

== Etymology and motto ==
The ship inherits its name from INS Kalvari (S23) which served in the Indian Navy from 1967 to 1996. Kalvari is the Malayalam word for tiger shark, a deep-sea predator in the Indian Ocean. The name symbolizes agility, strength and predatory power. The tiger shark (Galeocerdo cuvier) is a species of requiem shark which are found in tropical and temperate waters. The ship's motto is "Ever Onward" which represents the submarine's zeal and indomitable spirit.

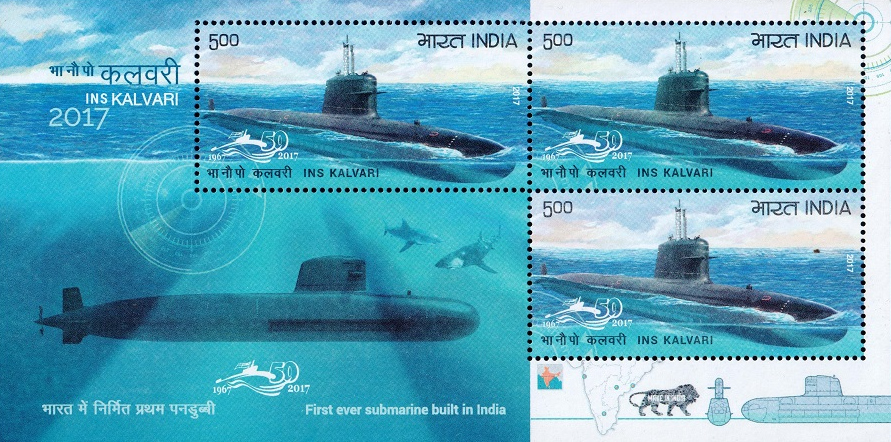
INS Kalvari stampsheet issued in 2017

== History and construction ==
The submarine was designated as Yard 11875 at Mazagon Dock Limited and construction began on 14 December 2006 with the first cutting of steel. The keel laying was completed on 1 April 2009. The five separate sections of the submarine were welded together, called "Boot Together", on 30 July 2014. She was undocked to a pontoon from the East Yard dock on 6 April 2015 in the presence of the then Defence Minister Manohar Parrikar. The submarine hull construction was completed in 30 October 2015 and was delivered to the Indian Navy by September 2016.

She is the first Indian Naval vessel to be built using a modular approach. After completing the important milestones of vacuum test and battery loading, she was launched at the Naval Dockyard on 27 October 2015 by Ritu Shrawat, wife of then CMD, Rear Admiral R K Shrawat (Retd). She was brought back to Mazagon Dock Limited for completion of the Basin trials and Harbour Acceptance trials phase. After conquering numerous challenges faced during the ‘Setting to Work’ phase and undergoing rigorous Harbour tests & trials to the complete satisfaction of the customer, she commenced sea trials on 1 May 2016. She was expected to be inducted into the Indian Navy fleet in 2012 but this was delayed.

The submarine successfully fired a torpedo and an Exocet SM39 Block 2 anti-ship missile in the Arabian Sea on 2 March 2017 during sea trials. She was delivered to the Indian Navy on 21 September 2017 after successful completion of sea trials. She was commissioned by Prime Minister Narendra Modi on 14 December 2017 at Mazagon Dock Limited. Her commissioning officer is Captain S D Mehendale.

== Operational history ==
=== Post Balakot ===
Following the 2019 Balakot airstrike conducted by the Indian Air Force, Indian Navy deployed INS Chakra along with INS Kalvari to search for the Pakistani submarine PNS Saad which was believed to be deployed.

As per Pakistan Navy, INS Kalvari was detected by its P3C Orion anti-Submarine aircraft, localised and blocked from entering Pakistani waters, while in Pakistani Exclusive Economic Zone, some 86 miles from Gwadar.

=== Scheduled Refit ===
It was reported on 4 August 2025 that the DRDO-developed AIP plug was still not ready for integration onto the submarines. As a result, Kalvari's maiden maintenance refit, which is underway, will be completed without being retrofitted with the AIP system. The system is now expected to be ready before the scheduled maintenance refit of the second submarine, Khanderi, during mid-2026.

== See also ==
- List of submarines of the Indian Navy
