= INS Shalki =

1989 Shishumar-class submarine

History

India
- Name: INS Shalki
- Namesake: Common dolphin
- Builder: Mazagon Dock Limited
- Launched: 30 September 1989
- Commissioned: 7 February 1992
- Status: in active service

General characteristics
- Class & type: Shishumar-class submarine
- Displacement: 1450 tons surfaced; 1850 tons submerged
- Length: 64.4 m (211 ft)
- Beam: 6.5 m (21 ft)
- Draught: 6 m (20 ft)
- Propulsion: 4 × 2,400 hp (1,800 kW) diesel-electric motors; 1 × Siemens 4,600 hp (3,400 kW) motor; 4 × 1.8 MW (2,400 hp) Siemens alternators; 1 shaft
- Speed: Surfaced 11 knots (20 km/h); Submerged 22 knots (41 km/h)
- Range: Snorting 8,000 nautical miles (15,000 km) at 8 kn (15 km/h)
- Test depth: Test depth 260 m (850 ft)
- Complement: 40 (incl 8 officers)
- Armament: 14 × AEG-SUT Mod 1 wire-guided active/passive torpedoes; 24 × external strap-on mines

INS Shalki (S46) (lit. 'Dolphin') is a Shishumar-class diesel-electric submarine of the Indian Navy. The submarine was the first ever submarine to be built in India.

== Service history ==
On 2 August 2024, INS Shalki arrived at the Port of Colombo, situated in Colombo, Sri Lanka, as part of a formal visit. Following the completion of the official engagement, the submarine is scheduled to depart from the island country on 4 August 2024. This is the third submarine to visit Sri Lanka after the visit of INS Vagir and INS Karanj in June 2023 and February 2024, respectively.
