= INS Karanj =

INS Karanj may refer to the following vessels of the Indian Navy:

- INS Karanj (S21), a Kalvari-class submarine launched in 1968 and decommissioned in 2003
- INS Karanj (S23), a Kalvari-class submarine that was launched in 2018
