= INS Vagir =

Two ships of the Indian Navy have been named INS Vagir:

- INS Vagir (S41) was a Vela-class submarine launched in 1972 and decommissioned in 2001
- INS Vagir (S25) is a Kalvari-class submarine launched in 2020
