= INS Vela =

Two ships of the Indian Navy have been named INS Vela:

- INS Vela (S40) was a Vela-class submarine launched in 1972 and decommissioned in 2010
- INS Vela (S24) is a Kalvari-class submarine launched in 2019
