= INS Vela (S24) =

Kalvari-class submarine of the Indian Navy

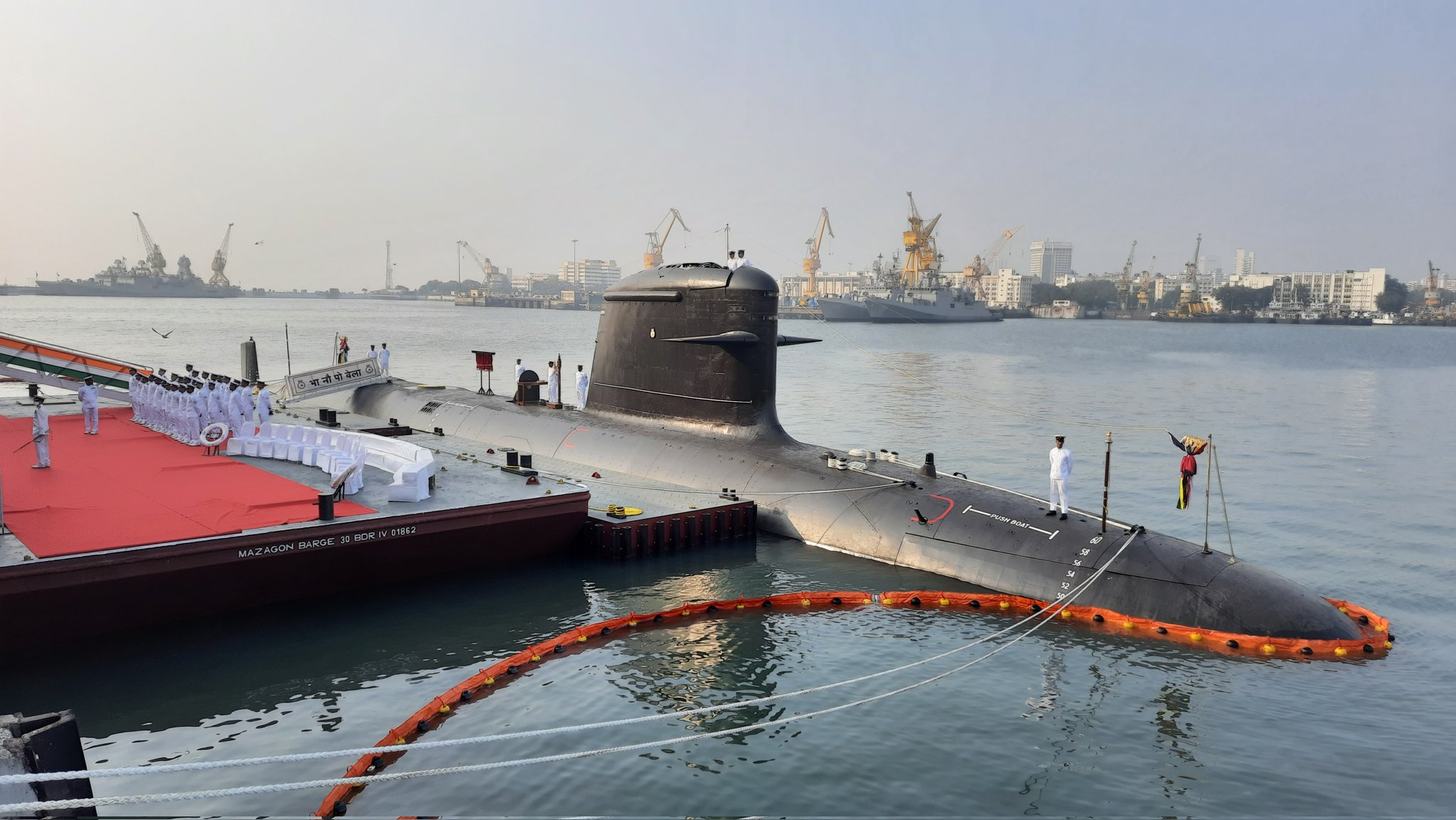
- INS Vela (S24) during its commissioning ceremony

History

India
- Name: INS Vela
- Namesake: Vela (S40)
- Ordered: 2005
- Builder: Mazagon Dock Shipbuilders Limited, Mumbai
- Launched: 6 May 2019
- Acquired: 9 November 2021
- Commissioned: 25 November 2021
- Identification: Pennant number: S24
- Motto: Vigilant, Valiant, Victorious
- Status: In Service
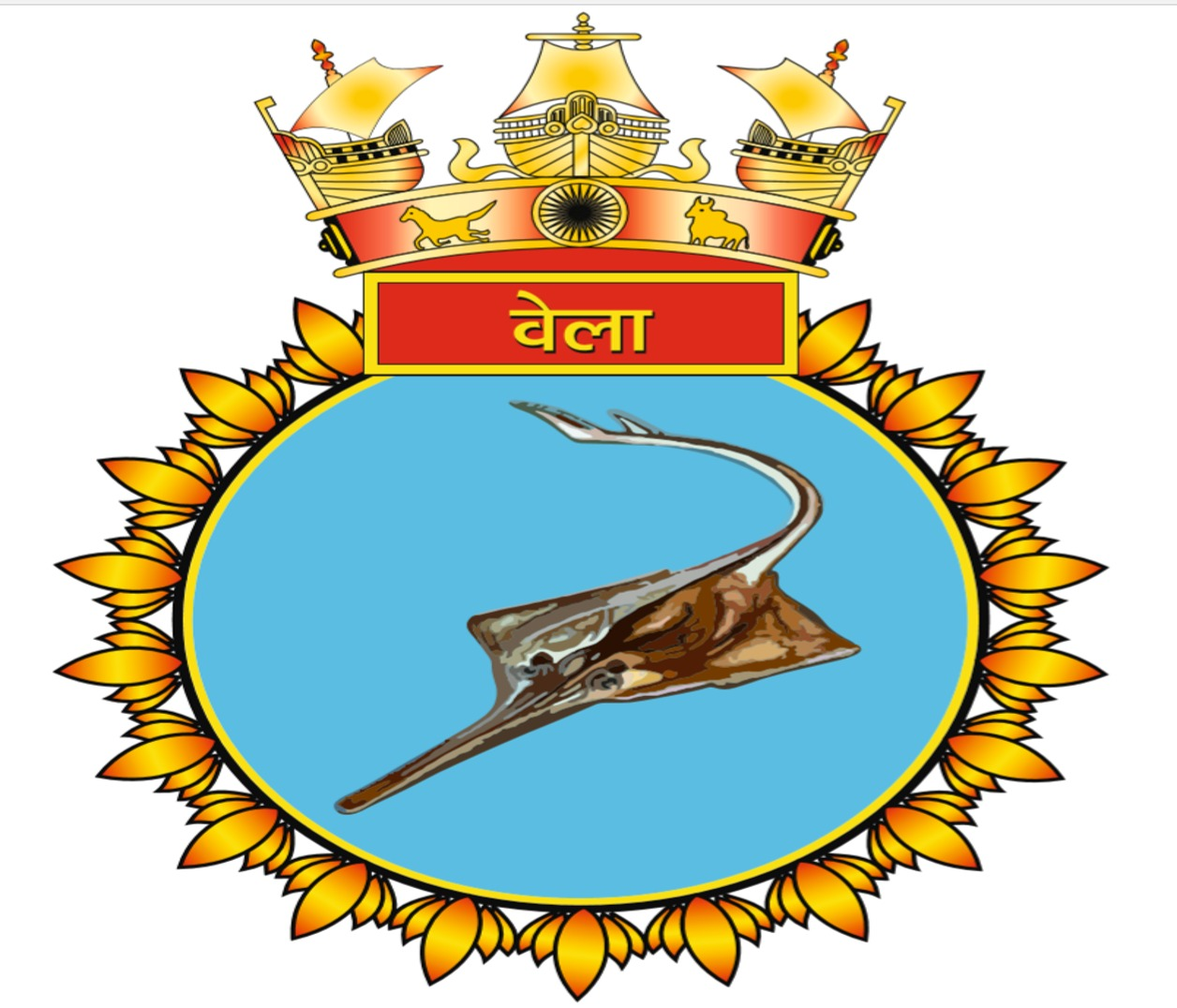
- Badge

General characteristics
- Class & type: Kalvari-class submarine
- Displacement: Surfaced: 1,615 tonnes (1,780 short tons); Submerged: 1,775 tonnes (1,957 short tons)
- Length: 67.5 m (221 ft)
- Beam: 6.2 m (20 ft)
- Height: 12.3 m (40 ft)
- Draught: 5.8 m (19 ft)
- Propulsion: 4 x MTU 12V 396 SE84 diesel engines; 360 x battery cells; DRDO PAFC Fuel Cell AIP (To be added in mid-life refit)
- Speed: Surfaced: 11 kn (20 km/h); Submerged: 20 kn (37 km/h)
- Range: 6,500 nmi (12,000 km) at 8 kn (15 km/h) (surfaced); 550 nmi (1,020 km) at 4 kn (7.4 km/h) (submerged)
- Endurance: 50 days
- Test depth: 350 metres (1,150 ft)
- Complement: 8 officers; 35 sailors
- Electronic warfare & decoys: C303/S anti-torpedo countermeasure system
- Armament: 6 x 533 mm (21 in) torpedo tubes for 18 SUT torpedoes OR; SM.39 Exocet anti-ship missiles; 30 mines in place of torpedoes

INS Vela (S24) (lit. 'Stingray') is the fourth submarine of the first batch of six Kalvari-class submarines for the Indian Navy. It is a diesel-electric attack submarine based on the Scorpène class, designed by French naval defence and energy group DCNS and manufactured by Mazagon Dock Limited, an Indian shipyard in Mumbai. The first cutting of steel for the submarine began on 14 July 2009, and the ship was launched on 6 May 2019.

The submarine was delivered to Indian Navy on 9 November 2021, and formally commissioned into the service by Chief of the Naval Staff Admiral Karambir Singh on 25 November.

The submarine inherits its name from INS Vela (S40) which served in the Navy from 1973 to 2010, and was the lead ship of the Vela-class. The crew of the INS Vela (S40) was present at the commissioning ceremony of the INS Vela (S24). Vela is the name of an Indian fish from the stingray species known for its aggression and offensive power, and the ability to camouflage itself from predators. The submarine's crest depicts the stingray swimming across the blue seas. The ship's mascot is a sub-ray, a portmanteau of submarine and stingray. The mascot symbolises the "metamorphosis of the submarine’s character with the qualities of a stingray".

== Service history ==
INS Vela made a port call at Port of Colombo, Sri Lanka for a three day visit from 11 to 13 November 2024 under the command of Commander Kapil Kumar.

== See also ==
- List of submarines of the Indian Navy
- List of active Indian Navy ships
