= INS Karanj (S23) =

Kalvari-class submarine of the Indian Navy

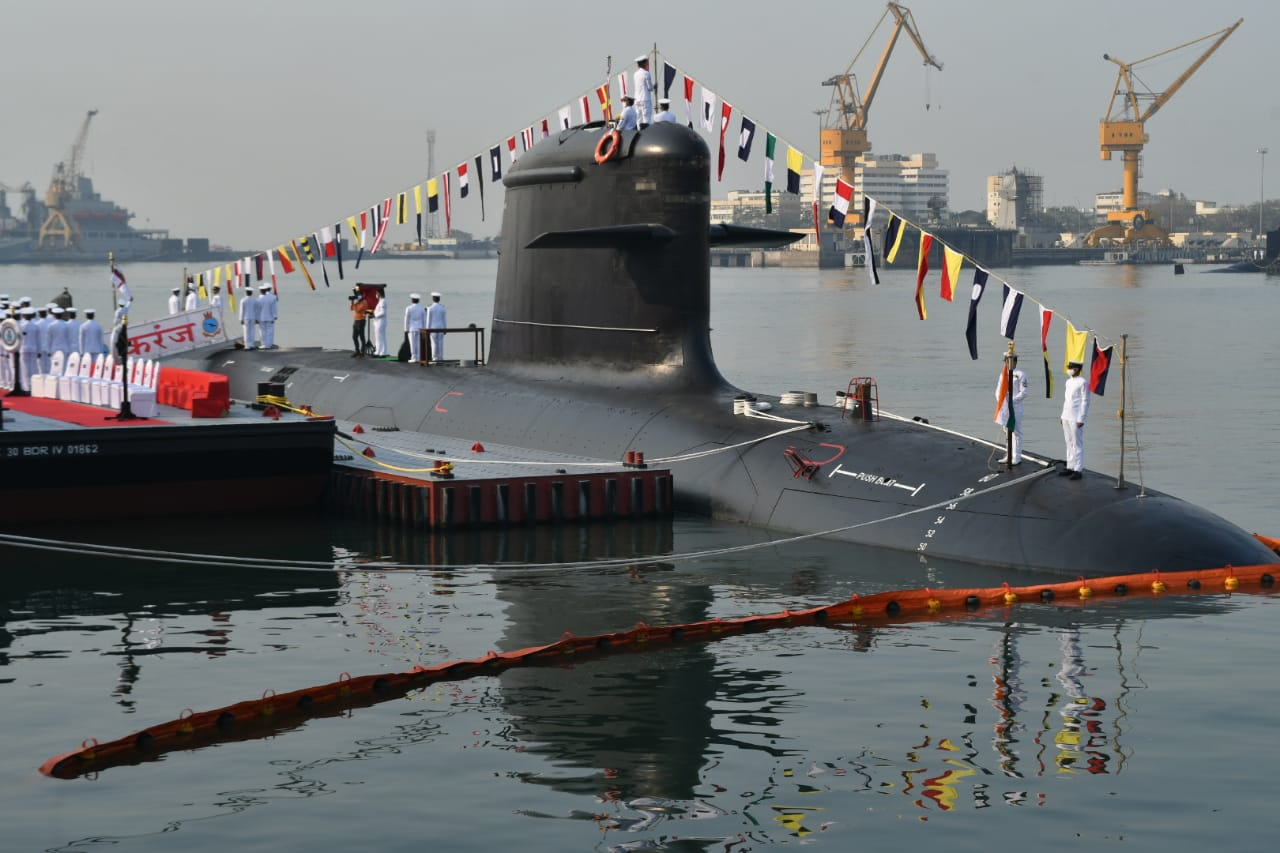
- INS Karanj (S23) during commissioning ceremony.

History

India
- Name: INS Karanj
- Namesake: Karanj (S21)
- Ordered: 2005
- Builder: Mazagon Dock Shipbuilders Limited, Mumbai
- Launched: 31 January 2018
- Acquired: 15 February 2021
- Commissioned: 10 March 2021
- Identification: Pennant number: S21
- Motto: Sanskrit: Nity Nirghosh Nirbheek
- Status: in active service

General characteristics
- Class & type: Kalvari-class submarine
- Displacement: Surfaced: 1,615 tonnes (1,780 short tons); Submerged: 1,775 tonnes (1,957 short tons)
- Length: 67.5 m (221 ft)
- Beam: 6.2 m (20 ft)
- Height: 12.3 m (40 ft)
- Draught: 5.8 m (19 ft)
- Propulsion: 4 x MTU 12V 396 SE84 diesel engines; 360 x battery cells; DRDO PAFC Fuel Cell AIP (To be added in mid-life refit)
- Speed: Surfaced: 11 kn (20 km/h); Submerged: 20 kn (37 km/h)
- Range: 6,500 nmi (12,000 km) at 8 kn (15 km/h) (surfaced); 550 nmi (1,020 km) at 4 kn (7.4 km/h) (submerged)
- Endurance: 50 days
- Test depth: 350 metres (1,150 ft)
- Complement: 8 officers; 35 sailors
- Electronic warfare & decoys: C303/S anti-torpedo countermeasure system
- Armament: 6 x 533 mm (21 in) torpedo tubes for 18 SUT torpedoes OR; SM.39 Exocet anti-ship missiles; 30 mines in place of torpedoes

INS Karanj (S23) is the third submarine of the first batch of six Kalvari-class submarines for the Indian Navy. It is a diesel-electric attack submarine based on the Scorpène class, designed by French naval defence and energy group DCNS and manufactured by Mazagon Dock Limited, an Indian shipyard in Mumbai. The submarine was launched on 31 January 2018, delivered to Indian Navy on 15 February 2021, commissioned on 10 March 2021 in Mumbai in presence of Chief of Naval Staff Admiral Karambir Singh and Admiral VS Shekhawat (retd.).

The submarine inherits its name from INS Karanj (S21) which served in the Navy from 1969 to 2003, and was named after Karanja island, also known as Uran island, located in the Raigad district of Maharashtra.

== Service history ==
On 3 February 2024, INS Karanj arrived at the Port of Colombo, situated in Colombo, Sri Lanka, as part of a formal visit. Following the completion of the official engagement, the submarine is scheduled to depart from the island on 5 February 2024.

On 21 November 2024, INS Karanj collided with a fishing boat FV Marthoma around 70 NM (130 km) off the coast of Goa. The accident resulted in the death of 2 crew of the fishing boat and a damage worth ₹10 crore (equivalent to ₹11 crore or US$1.1 million in 2026) for the submarine. The rest of 11 crew members of the boat were rescued as the boat sank. The captain of the boat was arrested. However, the submarine remains operational and minor repair works are being undertaken.

== See also ==
- List of submarines of the Indian Navy
- List of active Indian Navy ships
