= INS Khanderi (2017) =

Kalvari-class submarine of the Indian Navy

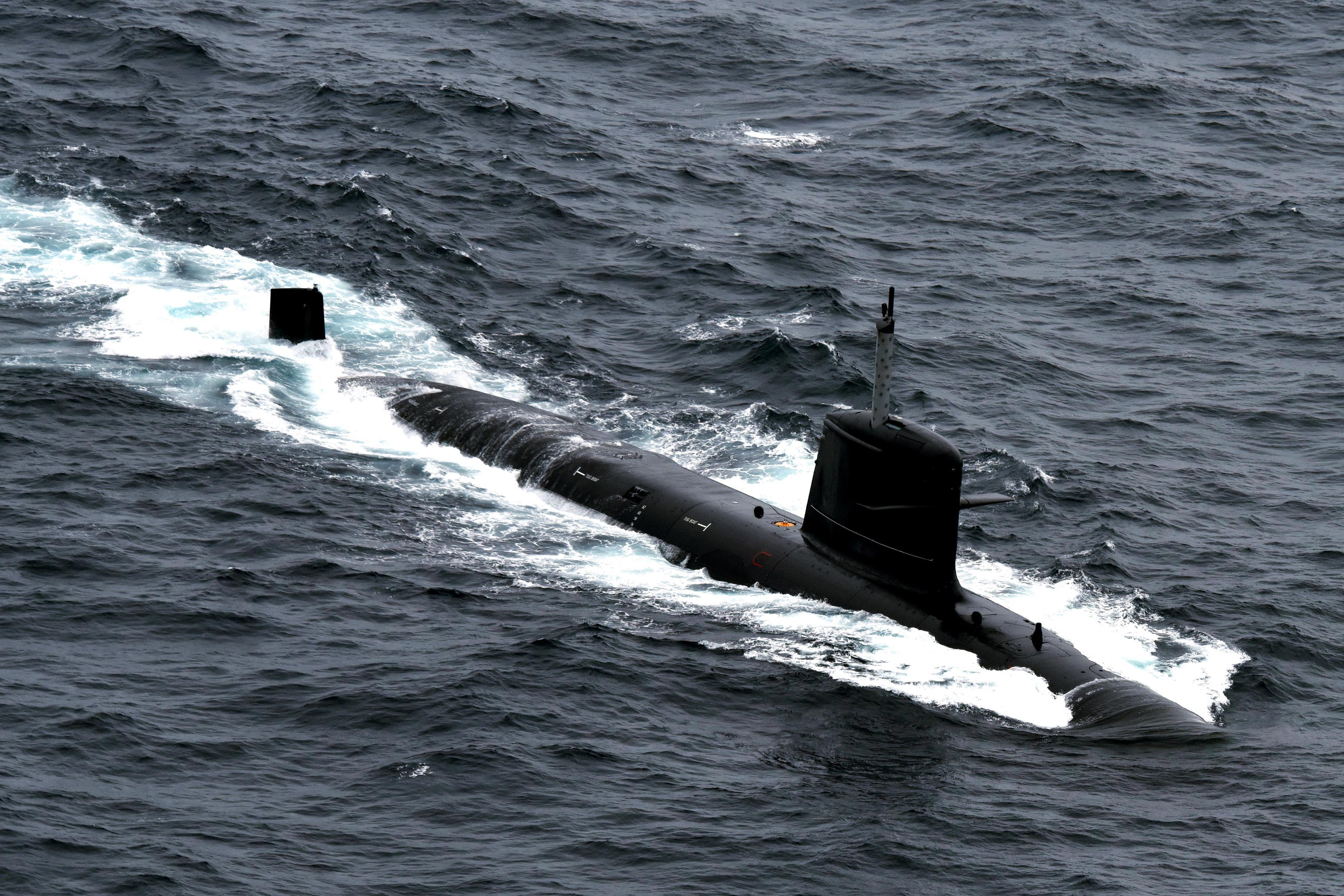
- INS Khanderi at sea

History

India
- Name: INS Khanderi
- Namesake: INS Khanderi (1968)
- Ordered: 2005
- Builder: Mazagon Dock Limited, Mumbai
- Launched: 12 January 2017
- Acquired: 20 September 2019
- Commissioned: 28 September 2019
- Identification: Pennant number: S22
- Motto: Sanskrit: Akhand Abhedya Adrishya
- Status: In active service
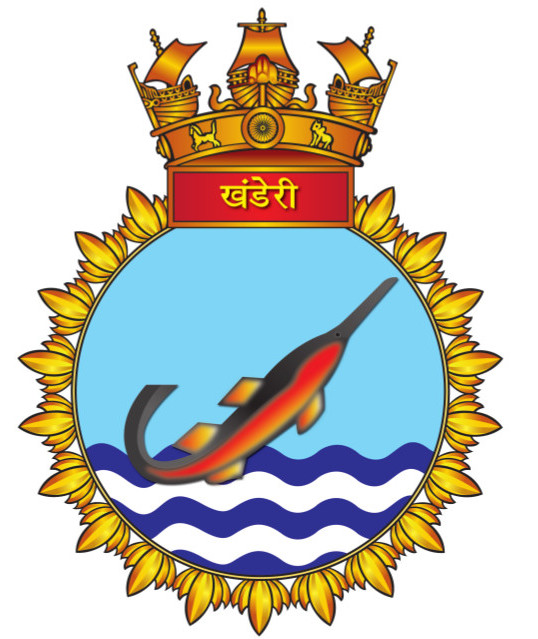
- Badge

General characteristics
- Class & type: Kalvari-class submarine
- Displacement: Surfaced: 1,615 tonnes (1,780 short tons); Submerged: 1,775 tonnes (1,957 short tons)
- Length: 67.5 m (221 ft)
- Beam: 6.2 m (20 ft)
- Height: 12.3 m (40 ft)
- Draught: 5.8 m (19 ft)
- Propulsion: 4 x MTU 12V 396 SE84 diesel engines; 360 x battery cells; DRDO PAFC Fuel Cell AIP (To be added in mid-life refit)
- Speed: Surfaced: 11 kn (20 km/h); Submerged: 20 kn (37 km/h)
- Range: 6,500 nmi (12,000 km) at 8 kn (15 km/h) (surfaced); 550 nmi (1,020 km) at 4 kn (7.4 km/h) (submerged)
- Endurance: 50 days
- Test depth: 350 metres (1,150 ft)
- Complement: 8 officers; 35 sailors
- Electronic warfare & decoys: C303/S anti-torpedo countermeasure system
- Armament: 6 x 533 mm (21 in) torpedo tubes for 18 SUT torpedoes OR; SM.39 Exocet anti-ship missiles; 30 mines in place of torpedoes

INS Khanderi (S22) is the second of the Indian Navy's six Kalvari-class submarines, built in India. It is a diesel-electric attack submarine which was designed by French naval defence and energy company DCNS and manufactured at Mazagon Dock Limited in Mumbai.

The submarine inherits its name and pennant number from INS Khanderi (S22) which served in the Navy from 1968–1989, and was named after Maratha Emperor Chhatrapati Shivaji Maharaj's island fort of Khanderi.

== Construction ==
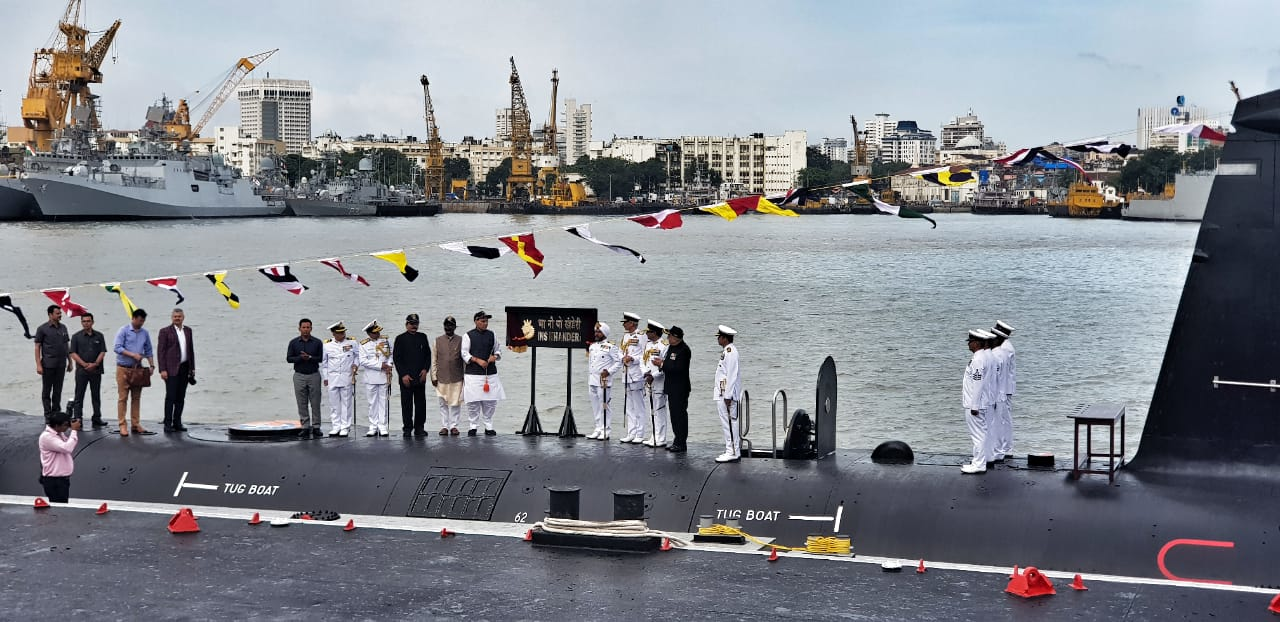
Commissioning of INS Khanderi

The construction started on 7 April 2009 at Mazagon Dock's Yard number Y11876 with the steel cutting ceremony. The five separate sections of the submarine were welded together, called "Boot Together", in November 2016. The submarine was launched in the presence of Minister of State for Defence Subhash Bhamre, Chief of the Naval Staff Admiral Sunil Lanba and other dignitaries on 12 January 2017. The submarine began its sea trials on 1 June 2017. The submarine was delivered to the Navy on 19 September 2019.

The submarine was commissioned by Defence Minister Rajnath Singh on 28 September 2019.

== Operational history ==
On 27 May 2022, Defence Minister Rajnath Singh conducted a sea sortie on INS Khanderi during his visit to Karwar Naval Base in Karnataka. During the sortie, Rajnath Singh was showcased the offensive capabilities of the submarine types through a wide range of operational drills with the submarine demonstrating the advanced sensor suite, combat system and weapon capability which provides it a distinct advantage in the subsurface domain.

The submarine has a scheduled maintenance refit in mid-2026 during which it is expected to be the first submarine to be retrofitted with the DRDO-developed AIP module. The AIP module would increase the submarine's length by 20 meters and mass by up to 1,700 tons. The refit is scheduled from mid-2026 and the integration is expected to be completed by December 2026. This would be followed by initial sea trials commencing in July–August 2027 with the full refit process to conclude by early-2028. The systems has already reached advanced stages of trials.

== See also ==
- List of submarines of the Indian Navy
