= INS Vagir (S25) =

Kalvari-class submarine of the Indian Navy

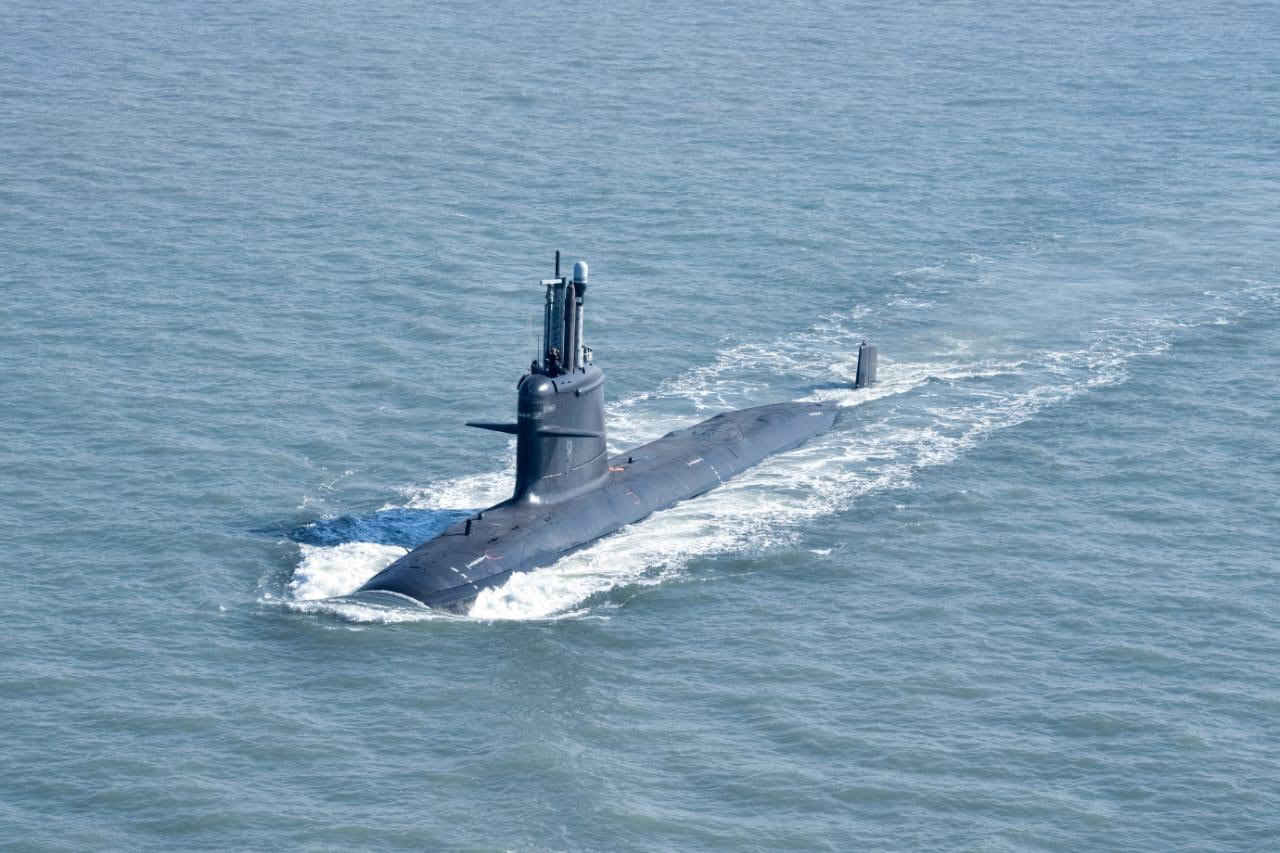
- Vagir during its sea sortie

History

India
- Name: INS Vagir
- Namesake: Vagir (S41)
- Ordered: 2005
- Builder: Mazagon Dock Shipbuilders Limited, Mumbai
- Launched: 12 November 2020
- Acquired: 20 December 2022
- Commissioned: 23 January 2023
- Home port: INS Vajrabahu, Mumbai
- Status: in active service

General characteristics
- Class & type: Kalvari-class submarine
- Displacement: Surfaced: 1,615 tonnes (1,589 long tons); Submerged: 1,775 tonnes (1,747 long tons)
- Length: 67.5 m (221 ft 5 in)
- Beam: 6.2 m (20 ft 4 in)
- Height: 12.3 m (40 ft 4 in)
- Draught: 5.8 m (19 ft 0 in)
- Propulsion: 4 x MTU 12V 396 SE84 diesel engines; 360 x battery cells; DRDO PAFC Fuel Cell AIP (to be added in mid-life refit)
- Speed: Surfaced: 11 kn (20 km/h); Submerged: 20 kn (37 km/h)
- Range: 6,500 nmi (12,000 km) at 8 kn (15 km/h) (surfaced); 550 nmi (1,020 km) at 4 kn (7.4 km/h) (submerged)
- Endurance: 50 days
- Test depth: 350 metres (1,150 ft)
- Complement: 8 officers; 35 sailors
- Electronic warfare & decoys: C303/S anti-torpedo countermeasure system
- Armament: 6 x 533 mm (21 in) torpedo tubes for 18 SUT torpedoes OR; SM.39 Exocet anti-ship missiles; 30 mines in place of torpedoes

INS Vagir (S25) (lit. 'Sandfish') is the fifth submarine of the first batch of six Kalvari-class submarines for the Indian Navy. It is a diesel-electric attack submarine based on the Scorpène class, designed by French naval defence and energy group Naval Group and manufactured by Mazagon Dock Limited, an Indian shipyard in Mumbai, Maharashtra.

== History and construction ==
The ship was launched on 12 November 2020.

The submarine inherits its name from INS Vagir (S41) which served in the Navy from 1973 to 2001, and was named after a species of sandfish.

Vagir, the fifth submarine in the Kalvari class, started its maiden sea trials on 2 February 2022. The ship was commissioned on 23 January 2023.

== Service history ==
Vagir was deployed on an extended patrol in the Indian Ocean. It first reached the Sri Lankan Port of Colombo on 19 June 2023 for a formal visit and departed the island on 22 June 2024. Later it covered nearly 7000 kilometres to reach Fremantle, Australia on 20 August 2023. This is the first time an Indian Scorpene submarine was on such a long deployment.

== Gallery ==
Vagir

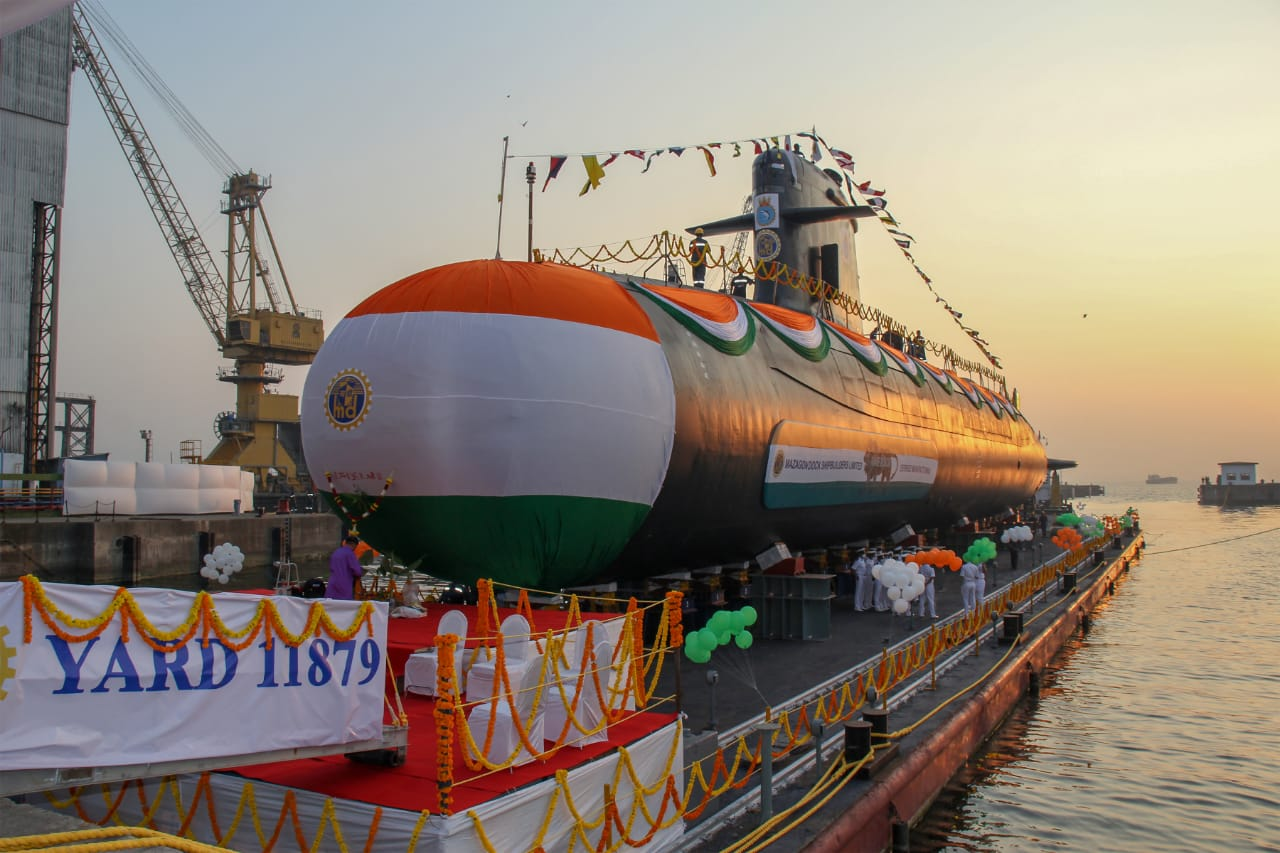
Launch of Vagir at Mazgaon Docks

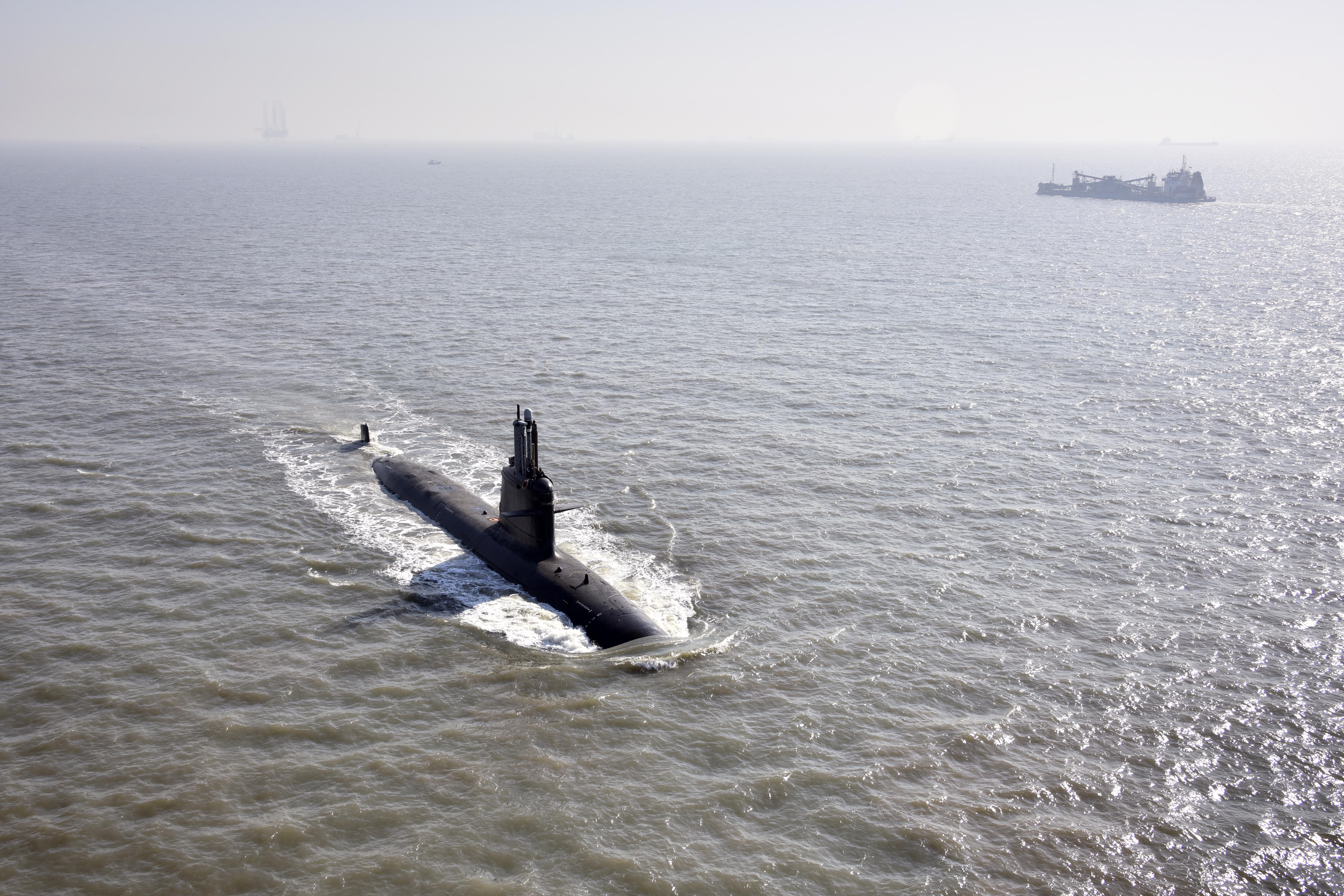
Vagir submarine during its maiden sea trials

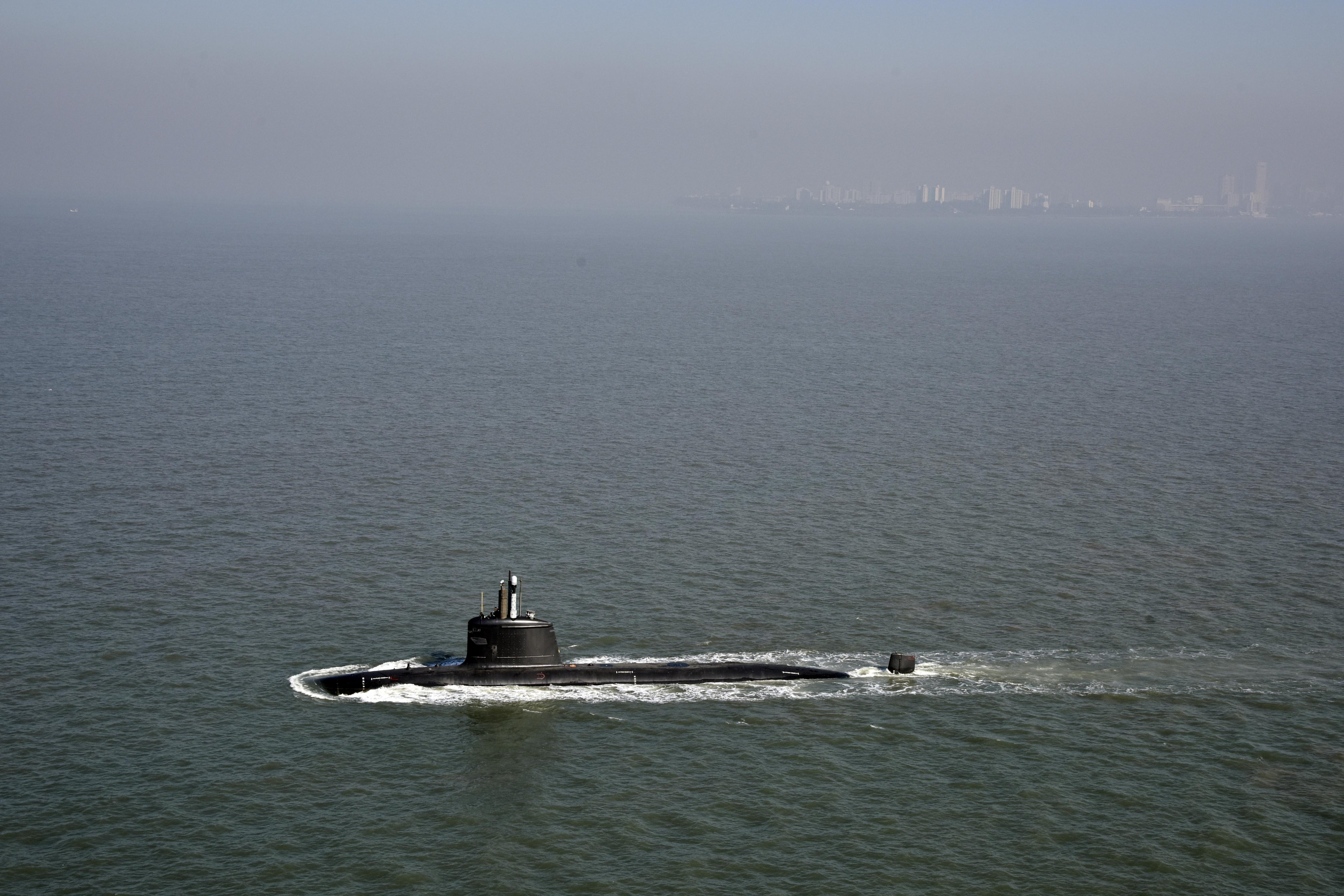
Vagir (S25) during its maiden sea trials

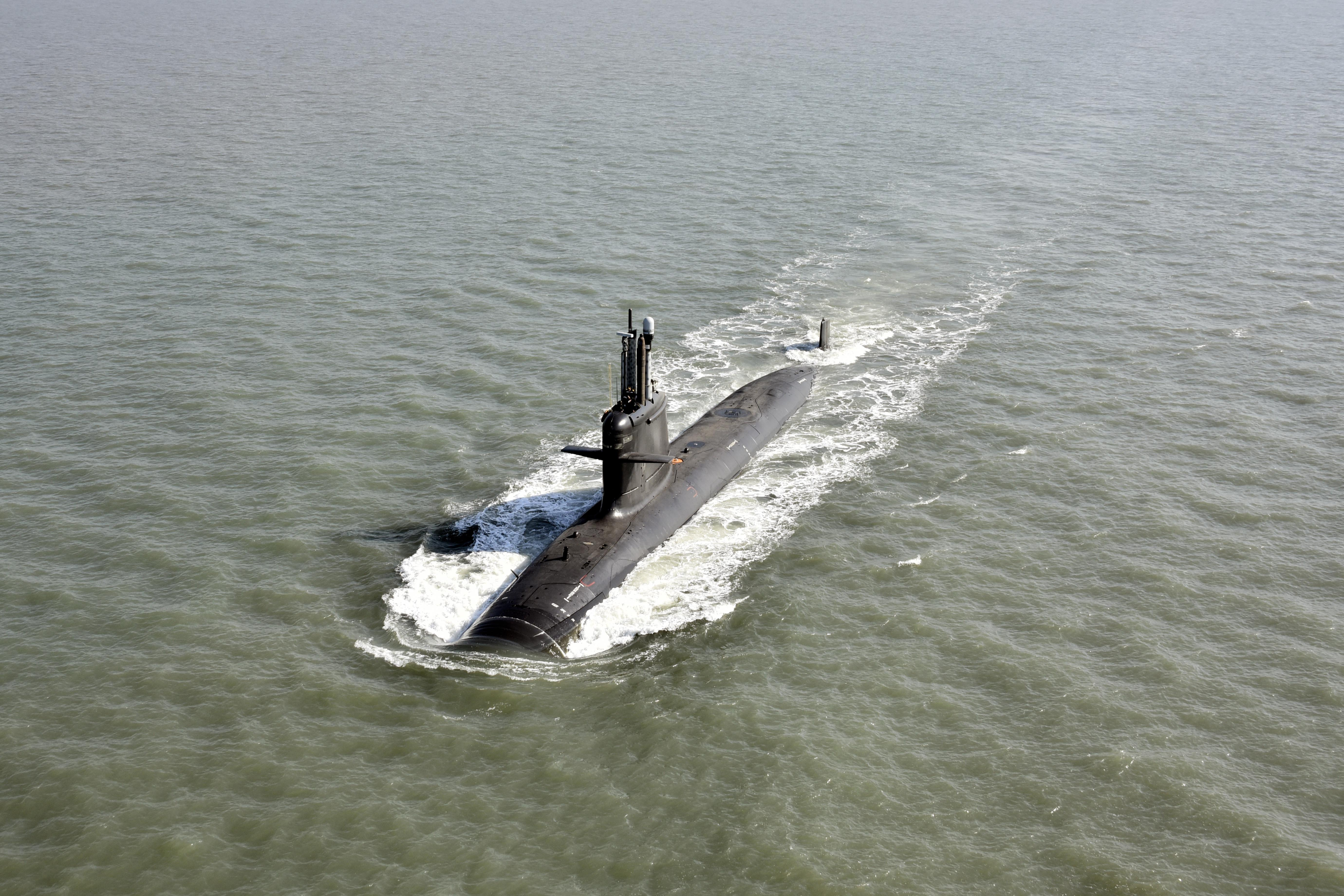
Vagir (S25) submarine during its maiden sea sortie

== See also ==
- List of submarines of the Indian Navy
- List of active Indian Navy ships
