= Air-independent propulsion =

Propulsion system for submarines which operates without access to atmospheric oxygen

Air-independent propulsion (AIP), or air-independent power, is any marine propulsion technology that allows a non-nuclear submarine to operate without access to atmospheric oxygen (by surfacing or using a snorkel). AIP can augment or replace the diesel-electric propulsion system of non-nuclear vessels.

Modern non-nuclear submarines are potentially stealthier than nuclear submarines; although some modern submarine reactors are designed to rely on natural circulation, most naval nuclear reactors use pumps to constantly circulate the reactor coolant, generating some amount of detectable noise. Non-nuclear submarines running on battery power or AIP, on the other hand, can be virtually silent. While nuclear-powered designs still dominate in submergence times, speed, range, and deep-ocean performance, small, high-tech non-nuclear attack submarines can be highly effective in coastal operations and pose a significant threat to less-stealthy and less-maneuverable nuclear submarines.

AIP is usually implemented as an auxiliary source, with the traditional diesel engine handling surface propulsion. Most such systems generate electricity, which in turn drives an electric motor for propulsion or recharges the boat's batteries. The submarine's electrical system is also used for providing "hotel services"—ventilation, lighting, heating etc.—although this consumes a small amount of power compared to that required for propulsion.

AIP can be retrofitted into existing submarine hulls by inserting an additional hull section. AIP does not typically provide the endurance or power to replace atmospheric dependent propulsion, but allows for longer underwater endurance than a conventionally propelled submarine. A typical conventional power plant provides 3 megawatts maximum, and an AIP source around 10% of that. A nuclear submarine's propulsion plant is usually much greater than 20 megawatts.

The United States Navy uses the hull classification symbol "SSP" to designate boats powered by AIP, while retaining "SSK" for classic diesel-electric attack submarines. (Note: United States Navy Glossary of Naval Ship Terms (GNST). SSI is sometimes used, but SSP has been declared the preferred term by the USN. SSK (ASW Submarine) as a designator for classic diesel-electric submarines was retired by the USN in the 1950s, but continues to be used colloquially by the USN and formally by navies of the British Commonwealth and corporations such as Jane's Information Group.)

== History ==
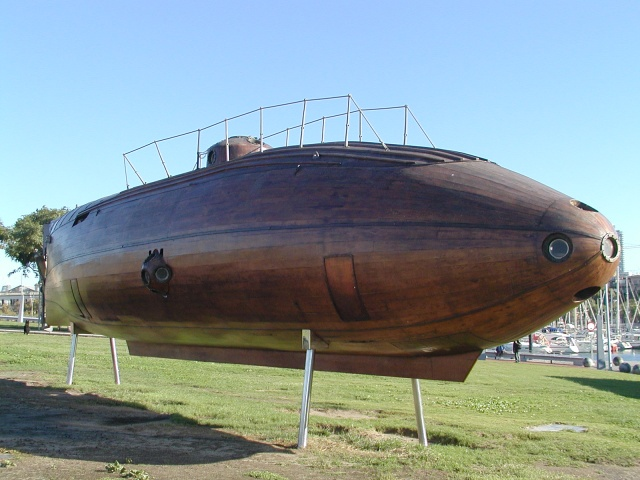
A replica of Ictineo II, Monturiol's pioneering submarine, in Barcelona.

In the development of submarines, the challenge of finding satisfactory forms of underwater propulsion has been persistent. The earliest submarines were powered by hand-cranked propellers, which quickly depleted the air supply; as a result, these vessels often had to operate on the surface with hatches open or use some form of breathing tube, both of which were inherently dangerous and led to numerous early accidents. Later, mechanically driven vessels utilized compressed air, steam, or electricity, which needed to be recharged from shore or from an onboard aerobic engine.

The earliest attempt at a fuel that would burn anaerobically was in 1867, when Spanish engineer Narciso Monturiol successfully developed a chemically powered anaerobic or air independent steam engine. The engine was powered by a mixture of potassium chlorate and zinc, which reacted to generate heat and, conveniently, oxygen.

In 1908 the Imperial Russian Navy launched the submarine Pochtovy, which used a gasoline engine fed with compressed air and exhausted under water.

These two approaches, the use of a fuel that provides energy to an open-cycle system, and the provision of oxygen to an aerobic engine in a closed cycle, characterize AIP today.

== Types ==
Air independent propulsion (non-nuclear) can take various forms. All currently active AIP submarines require oxygen for AIP, which is commonly stored as a liquid (LOX). AIP submarine range is primarily limited by the amount of LOX it can carry.

=== Open-cycle systems ===
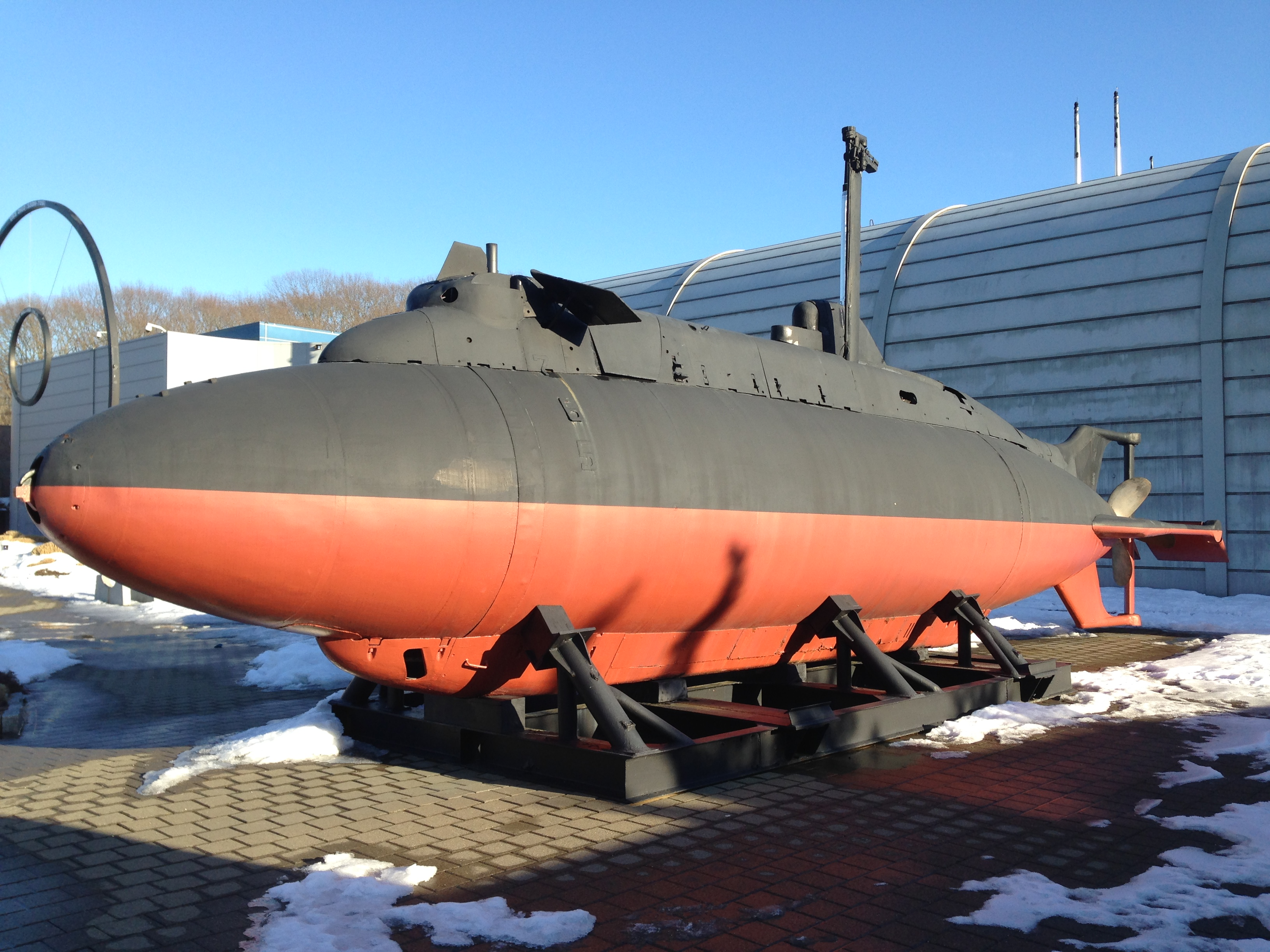
X-1 midget submarine on display at the Submarine Force Library and Museum in the United States

During World War II the German firm Walter experimented with submarines that used high-test (concentrated) hydrogen peroxide as their source of oxygen under water. These used steam turbines, employing steam heated by burning diesel fuel in the steam/oxygen atmosphere created by the decomposition of hydrogen peroxide by a potassium permanganate catalyst.

Several experimental boats were produced, though the work did not mature into any viable combat vessels. One drawback was the instability and scarcity of the fuel involved. Another was that while the system produced high underwater speeds, it was extravagant with fuel; the first boat, V-80, required 28 tons of fuel to travel 50 nautical miles (93 kilometres), and the final designs were little better.

After World War II, a Type XVII boat, U-1407, which had been scuttled at the end of World War II, was salvaged and recommissioned into the Royal Navy as HMS Meteorite. The British built two improved models in the late 1950s, HMS Explorer and HMS Excalibur. Meteorite was not popular with its crews, who regarded it as dangerous and volatile; she was officially described as 75% safe. The reputations of Excalibur and Explorer were little better; the boats were nicknamed Excruciater and Exploder.

The Soviet Union also experimented with the technology and one experimental boat was built which utilized hydrogen peroxide in a Walter engine.

The United States also received a Type XVII boat, U-1406, and went on to begin two AIP submarine projects. Project SCB 66 developed an experimental midget submarine, X-1, which was launched in September 1955. It was originally powered by a hydrogen peroxide/diesel engine and battery system until an explosion of her hydrogen peroxide supply on 20 May 1957. X-1 was later converted to a diesel-electric.

The second U.S. Navy project was of a full sized AIP submarine under SCB 67 in 1950, later SCB 67A. This submarine, designated SSX, would have one of three propulsion plants under development: a Walther open cycle hydrogen peroxide plant (termed Alton), a liquid oxygen steam plant (Ellis), and an AIP gas turbine (Wolverine). By late 1951 the Navy realized that while the competing nuclear designs were heavier due to shielding, they were more compact than the three AIP plants: the SSX would be longer than the SSN by nearly 40 feet. The SSN would likely be quieter and less complicated than the AIP technology of this time. By 1952 the nuclear reactors were so far along in development it appeared that the SSX submarine would not be needed as a stopgap. The project was cancelled on 26 October 1953.

The USSR and the UK, the only other countries known to be experimenting with the technology at that time, also abandoned it when the US developed the nuclear reactor small enough for submarine propulsion. Other nations, including Germany and Sweden, would later recommence AIP development.

It was retained for propelling torpedoes by the British and the Soviet Union, although hastily abandoned by the former following the HMS Sidon tragedy. Both this and the loss of the Russian submarine Kursk were due to accidents involving hydrogen peroxide propelled torpedoes.

=== Closed-cycle diesel engines ===
This technology uses a submarine diesel engine which can be operated conventionally on the surface, but which can also be provided with oxidant, usually stored as liquid oxygen, when submerged. Since the metal of an engine would burn in pure oxygen, the oxygen is usually diluted with recycled exhaust gas. Argon replaces exhaust gas when the engine is started.

In the late 1930s the Soviet Union experimented with closed-cycle engines, and a number of small M-class vessels were built using the REDO system, but none were completed before the German invasion in 1941.

During World War II the German Kriegsmarine experimented with such a system as an alternative to the Walter peroxide system, designing variants of their Type XVII U-boat and their Type XXVIIB Seehund midget submarine, the Type XVIIK and Type XXVIIK respectively, though neither was completed before the war's end.

After the war the USSR developed the small 650-ton Quebec-class submarine, of which thirty were built between 1953 and 1956. These had three diesel engines—two were conventional and one was closed cycle using liquid oxygen.

In the Soviet system, called a "single propulsion system", oxygen was added after the exhaust gases had been filtered through a lime-based chemical absorbent. The submarine could also run its diesel using a snorkel. The Quebec had three drive shafts: a 32D 900 bhp (670 kW) diesel on the centre shaft and two M-50P 700 bhp (520 kW) diesels on the outer shafts. In addition a 100 hp (75 kW) "creep" motor was coupled to the centre shaft. The boat could be run at slow speed using the centreline diesel only.

Because liquid oxygen cannot be stored indefinitely, these boats could not operate far from a base. It was dangerous; at least seven submarines suffered explosions, and one of these, M-256, sank following an explosion and fire. They were sometimes nicknamed cigarette lighters. The last submarine using this technology was scrapped in the early 1970s.

The German Navy's former Type 205 submarine U-1 (launched 1967) was fitted with an experimental 3,000 hp (2,200 kW) unit.

=== Closed-cycle steam turbines ===
The French MESMA (Module d'Energie Sous-Marin Autonome) system is offered by French shipyard DCNS. MESMA is available for the Agosta 90B and Scorpène-class submarines. It is essentially a modified version of their nuclear propulsion system with heat generated by ethanol and oxygen. Specifically, a conventional steam turbine power plant is powered by steam generated from the combustion of ethanol and stored oxygen at a pressure of 60 atmospheres. This pressure-firing allows exhaust carbon dioxide to be expelled overboard at any depth without an exhaust compressor.

Each MESMA system costs around $50–60 million. As installed on the Scorpènes, it requires adding an 8.3-metre (27 ft), 305-tonne hull section to the submarine, and results in a submarine able to operate for greater than 21 days underwater, depending on variables such as speed. On the Agosta 90B, the AIP system allows the submarine to operate 16 days under water and gives it a range of 1,400 nautical miles (2,600 km; 1,600 mi).

An article in Undersea Warfare Magazine notes that: "although MESMA can provide higher output power than the other alternatives, its inherent efficiency is the lowest of the four AIP candidates, and its rate of oxygen consumption is correspondingly higher."

=== Stirling cycle engines ===
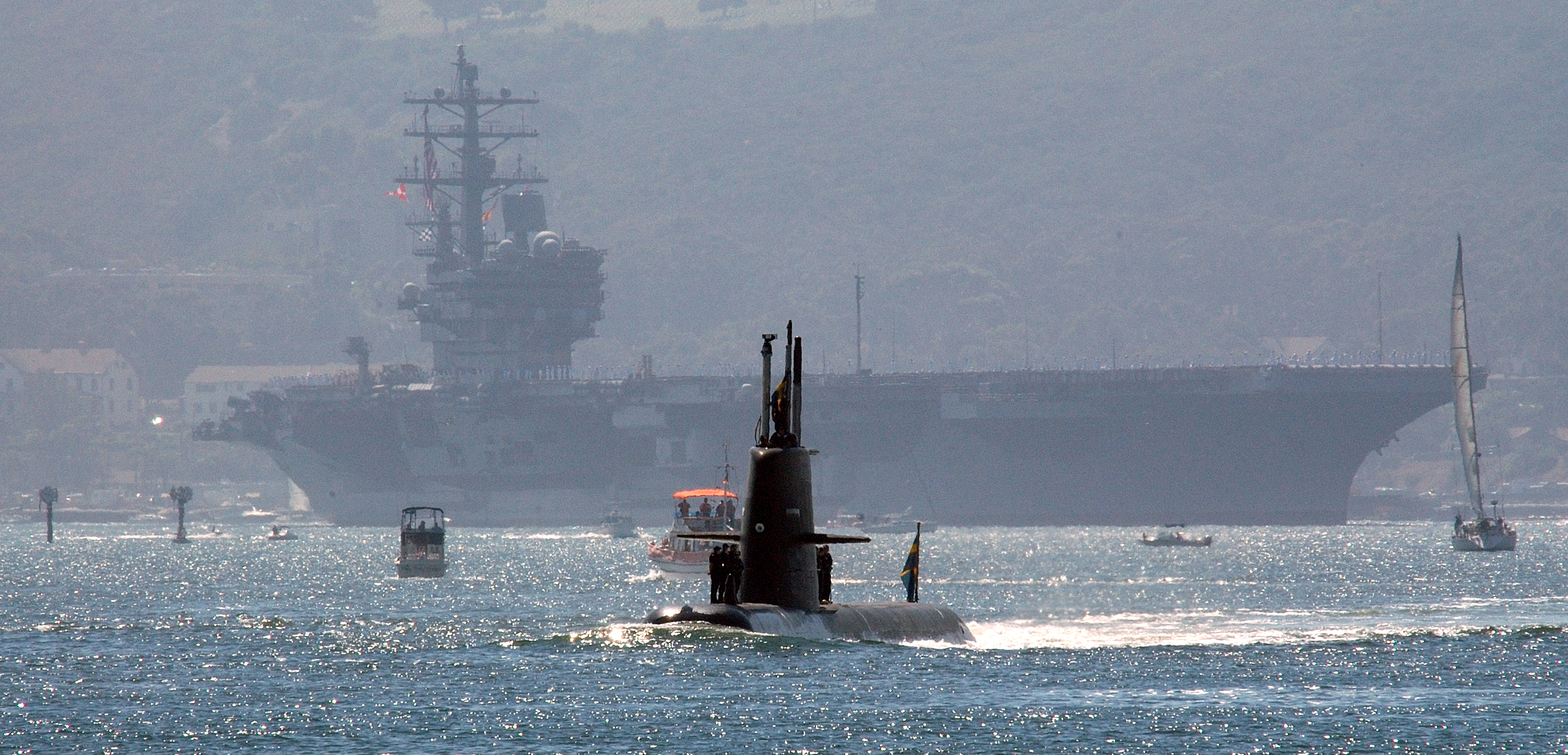
HSwMS Gotland in San Diego

The Swedish shipbuilder Kockums constructed three Gotland-class submarines for the Swedish Navy that are fitted with an auxiliary Stirling engine that burns diesel fuel with liquid oxygen to drive 75 kW electrical generators for either propulsion or charging batteries. The underwater endurance of the 1,500-tonne vessels is around 14 days at 5 kn (5.8 mph; 9.3 km/h), with an approximate range of 1700 nautical miles.

Kockums refurbished and upgraded the Swedish Västergötland-class submarines with a Stirling AIP plugin section. Two (Södermanland and Östergötland) are in service in Sweden as the Södermanland class, and two others are in service in Singapore as the Archer class (Archer and Swordsman).

Kockums also delivered Stirling engines to Japan. Ten Japanese submarines were equipped with Stirling engines. The first submarine in the class, Sōryū, was launched on 5 December 2007 and delivered to the navy in March 2009. The eleventh of the class is the first one that is equipped with lithium-ion batteries without a Stirling engine. This submarine may have a range from AIP of 6500 nautical miles and can remain submerged for 40 days.

The new Swedish Blekinge-class submarine has the Stirling AIP system as its main energy source. The submerged endurance will be more than 18 days at 5 knots using AIP.

=== Fuel cells ===
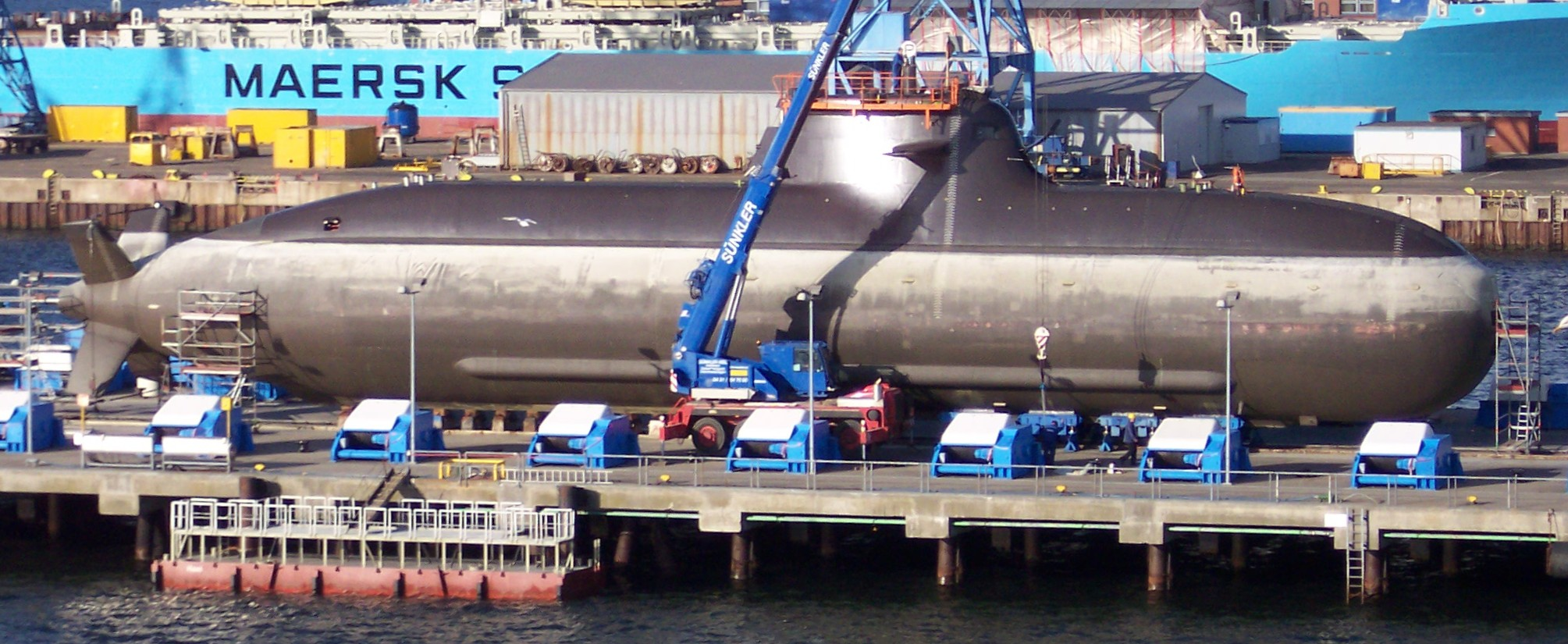
A Type 212 submarine of the German Navy, equipped with a fuel-cell AIP.

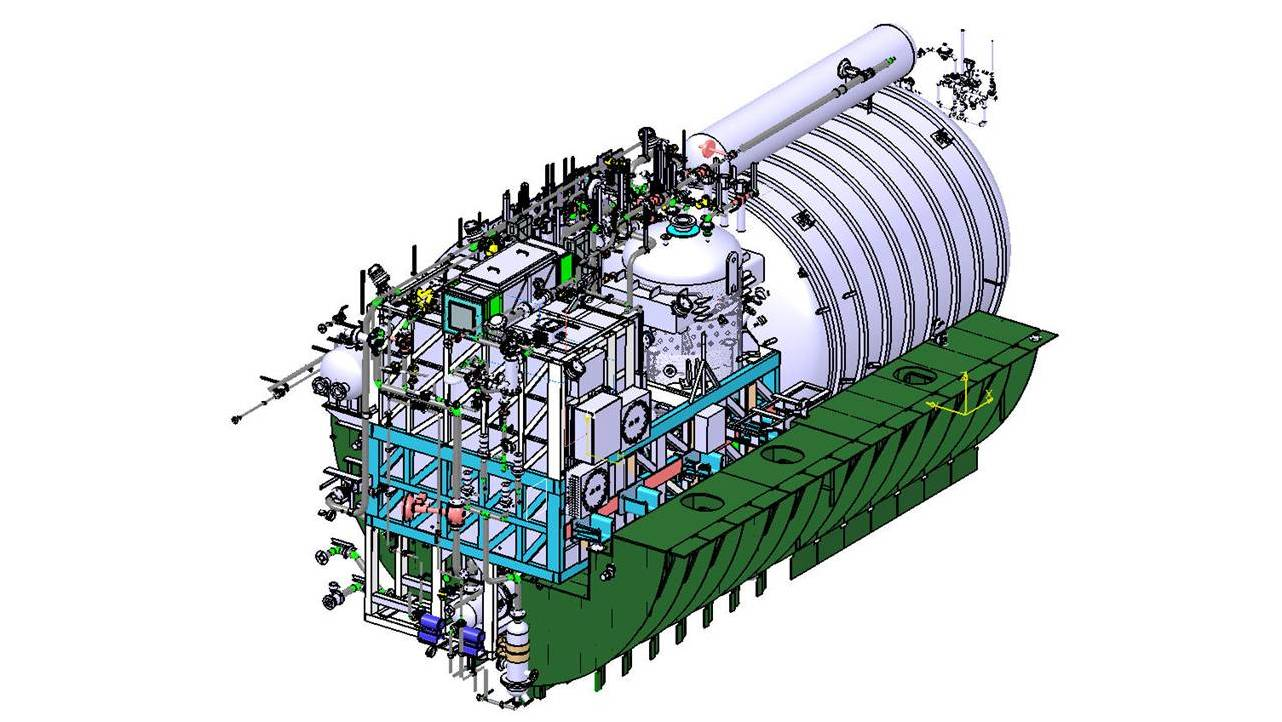
A diagram of the fuel-cell AIP module developed by the DRDO of India

Siemens has developed a 30–50 kilowatt fuel cell unit, a device that converts the chemical energy from a fuel and oxidiser into electricity. Fuel cells differ from batteries in that they require a continuous source of fuel (such as hydrogen) and oxygen, which are carried in the vessel in pressurized tanks, to sustain the chemical reaction. Nine of these units are incorporated into Howaldtswerke Deutsche Werft AG's 1,830 t submarine U-31, lead ship for the Type 212A of the German Navy. The other boats of this class and HDW's AIP equipped export submarines, Dolphin class, Type 209 mod and Type 214, use two 120 kW (160 hp) modules, also from Siemens. The Type 212 can remain submerged for 21 days; one such submarine conducted a 1600 nautical mile journey solely on AIP in 2016. After the success of Howaldtswerke Deutsche Werft AG in its export activities, several builders developed fuel-cell auxiliary units for submarines, but as of 2008 no other shipyard has a contract for a submarine so equipped.

The AIP implemented on the S-80 class of the Spanish Navy is based on a bioethanol-processor (provided by Hynergreen from Abengoa) consisting of a reaction chamber and several intermediate Coprox reactors, that transform the BioEtOH into high purity hydrogen. The output feeds a series of fuel cells from Collins Aerospace (which also supplied fuel cells for the Space Shuttle). The reformer is fed with bioethanol as fuel, and oxygen (stored as a liquid in a high pressure cryogenic tank), generating hydrogen as a sub-product. The produced hydrogen and more oxygen is fed to the fuel cells.

China has been researching fuel cell engines for AIP submarines. The Dalian Institute of Chemical Physics reportedly developed 100 kW and 1 MW fuel cell engines.

The Naval Materials Research Laboratory of the Indian Defence Research and Development Organisation in collaboration with Larsen & Toubro and Thermax has developed a 270 kilowatt phosphoric acid fuel cell (PAFC) to power the Kalvari-class submarines, which are based on the Scorpène design. All six Kalvari-class submarines will be retrofitted with AIP during their first refit. It produces electricity by reacting with hydrogen generated from sodium borohydride and stored oxygen with phosphoric acid acting as an electrolyte.

The Portuguese Navy Tridente-class submarines are also equipped with fuel cells.

== Nuclear power ==
Air-independent propulsion is a term normally used in the context of improving the performance of conventionally propelled submarines. However, as an auxiliary power supply, nuclear power falls into the technical definition of AIP. For example, a proposal to use a small 200-kilowatt reactor for auxiliary power—styled by Atomic Energy of Canada Limited (AECL) as a "nuclear battery"—could improve the under-ice capability of Canadian submarines.

Nuclear reactors have been used since the 1950s to power submarines. The first such submarine was USS Nautilus commissioned in 1954. Today, China, France, India, Russia, the United Kingdom and the United States are the only countries to have built and operated nuclear-powered submarines successfully.

== Non-nuclear AIP submarines ==
As of 2017, some ten nations are building AIP submarines with almost twenty nations operating AIP based submarines:

Country	AIP type	Builders	Submarines with AIP	Operators	Numbers with AIP, and notes
France	MESMA	Naval Group	Agosta 90B	Pakistan	Three modules in operational service.
Germany	Fuel cell	Siemens-ThyssenKrupp	Dolphin class	Israel	Three modules currently in operational service with the Dolphin-II submarines. Three more planned to enter service on the Dakar-class submarines, starting from 2031.
Germany	Fuel cell	Siemens-ThyssenKrupp	Type 209-1400mod	South Korea Greece; Egypt	One confirmed retrofit with AIP, up to nine additional Chang Bogo class possibly retrofit.
Germany	Fuel cell	Siemens-ThyssenKrupp	Type 212	Germany; Italy; Norway (planned)	Ten active / eight more planned Norway plans to procure four submarines based on the Type 212 by 2025.
Germany	Fuel cell	Siemens-ThyssenKrupp	Type 214	South Korea; Greece; Portugal; Turkey	Thirteen active / two under construction / eight more planned Three Turkish orders are being built at Gölcük Naval Shipyard. Three more are planned.
Germany	Fuel cell	Siemens-ThyssenKrupp	Type 218SG	Singapore	Four modules planned, of which two are slated to enter operational service by 2023.
India	Fuel cell	Naval Materials Research Laboratory Larsen & Toubro	Kalvari class	India	Six modules planned to be integrated during the mid-life refit of each submarine, which is set to commence from mid-2026 with INS Khanderi.
Japan	Stirling AIP	Kawasaki-Kockums	Harushio class	Japan	One retrofit: Asashio.
Japan	Stirling AIP	Kawasaki-Kockums	Sōryū class	Japan	12 active
China	Stirling AIP	711 Research Institute-CSHGC	Type 039A Yuan-class / 041 Zhou-class	China	20 completed and 5 under construction
China	Stirling AIP	711 Research Institute-CSHGC	Type 032 Qing-class	China	Experimental submarine
China	Stirling AIP	711 Research Institute-CSHGC	Hangor class	Pakistan	Eight modules planned, with the first four to be integrated by China and the latter four by Pakistan. First module estimated to become operational by 2023.
Russia	Fuel cell	Rubin Design Bureau; NIISET Krylov	Project 677 Лада (Lada)	Russia	None currently operational, with indications of no future plans to install them on submarines, as of 2019.
Republic of Korea	Fuel cell	Hanwha Ocean; HD Hyundai Heavy Industries	Dosan Ahn Changho class	Republic of Korea	Two module operational, with one under trials. Three more modules planned, with the first to enter service by 2028.
Spain	Fuel cell	Navantia	S-80 class	Spain	Four modules planned to be integrated, with the first module planned to be installed on the Cosme García (S-83) during its construction, while AIP retrofits are planned for Isaac Peral (S-81) and Narciso Monturiol (S-82) during its respective maintenance overhauls.
Sweden	Stirling AIP	Kockums	Gotland class	Sweden	Three active
Sweden	Stirling AIP	Kockums	Archer class	Singapore	Two active (retrofit of the Västergötland class)
Sweden	Stirling AIP	Kockums	Södermanland class	Sweden	2 active (retrofit of the Västergötland class)
Sweden	Stirling AIP	Kockums	Blekinge-class submarine	Sweden	2 planned

== Sources ==
- Friedman, Norman (1994). U.S. Submarines Since 1945: An Illustrated Design History. Annapolis, Maryland: United States Naval Institute. ISBN 1-55750-260-9.
