= Kalvari-class submarine (2015) =

Class of submarines based on the Scorpène-class submarine

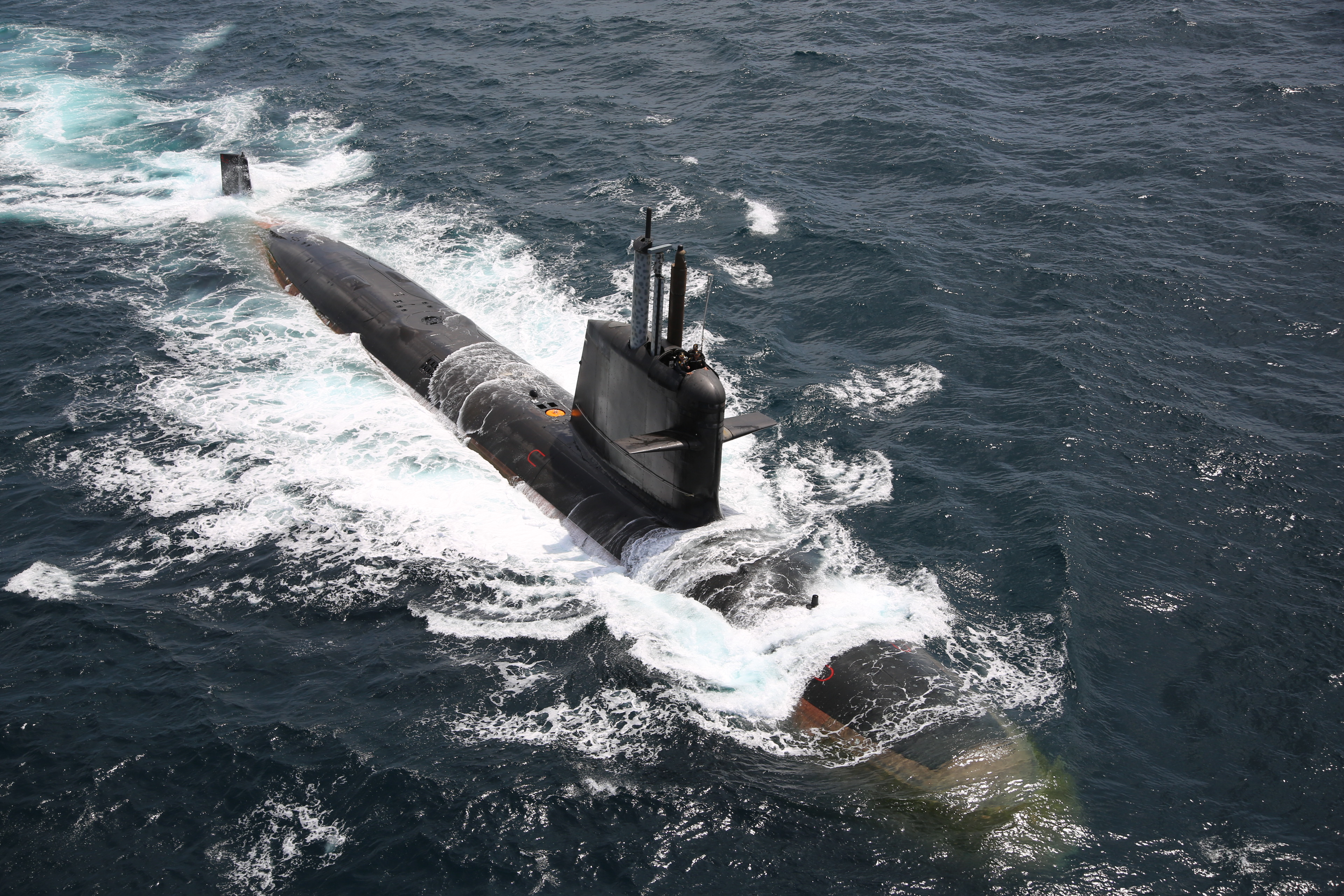
- Kalvari, the lead vessel of the class, at sea

Class overview
- Name: Kalvari class
- Builders: Mazagon Dock Limited
- Operators: Indian Navy
- Preceded by: Sindhughosh class; Shishumar class
- Succeeded by: Project 75I
- Cost: ₹23,652 crore (equivalent to ₹370 billion or US$3.9 billion in 2026) for six units; ₹3,942 crore (equivalent to ₹62 billion or US$640 million in 2026) per unit (FY 2016)
- In commission: 2017 – present
- Planned: 9
- Completed: 6
- Canceled: 3
- Active: 6

General characteristics
- Type: Attack submarine
- Displacement: Surfaced: 1,615 tonnes (1,589 long tons); Submerged: 1,775 tonnes (1,747 long tons)
- Length: 67.5 m (221 ft 5 in)
- Beam: 6.2 m (20 ft 4 in)
- Height: 12.3 m (40 ft 4 in)
- Draught: 5.8 m (19 ft 0 in)
- Propulsion: 4 x MTU 12V 396 SE84 diesel engines; 360 x battery cells; DRDO PAFC Fuel Cell AIP (expected to be added in Fleet I submarines from September 2025 onwards)
- Speed: Surfaced: 11 knots (20 km/h; 13 mph); Submerged: 20 knots (37 km/h; 23 mph)
- Range: 6,500 nmi (12,000 km; 7,500 mi) at 8 kn (15 km/h; 9.2 mph) (surfaced); 550 nmi (1,020 km; 630 mi) at 4 kn (7.4 km/h; 4.6 mph) (submerged)
- Endurance: 50 days
- Test depth: 350 metres (1,150 ft)
- Complement: 8 officers; 35 sailors
- Electronic warfare & decoys: C303/S anti-torpedo countermeasure system
- Armament: 6 × 533 mm (21 in) weapon launching tubes.; 18 charges for SUT torpedo or SM39 Exocet AShM; OR; 30 naval mines

The Kalvari-class submarines (lit. 'Tiger shark'), formally classified as the Project-75 submarines (P-75), is a class of diesel-electric attack submarines operated by the Indian Navy (IN). Built by a syndicate of French and Indian shipyards, namely, Naval Group and Mazagon Dock Limited (MDL) respectively, the class is an export derivative of the French-origin Scorpène-class submarine, originally designed by Naval Group.

A namesake of the former Foxtrot-class submarines that the IN operated between 1967 and 2010, the class was originally planned in the late-1990s as an initial phase of a 30-year long naval rearmament roadmap to replace the IN's conventional submarine fleet, namely the Sindhughosh and Shishumar-class submarines. India's Ministry of Defence (MoD) placed an order of six submarines in 2005, at a cost of ₹23,562 crore (equivalent to ₹870 billion or US$9.1 billion in 2026). The final submarine entered service on 15 January 2025.

First introduced to operational service in 2017, the submarines are currently operated by the IN for a variety of missions, namely, littoral surveillance, intelligence gathering, anti-submarine warfare, anti-surface warfare and minelaying operations.

== History ==
=== Origins ===
In 1997, the Cabinet Committee on Security (CCS), the highest-decision-making body of India's Ministry of Defence (MoD), approved a proposal for the purchase of two Type 209/1500 attack submarines (SSK) for the Indian Navy (IN), at a then-estimated cost of ₹700 crore (equivalent to ₹39 billion or US$400 million in 2026). The two examples of the design, originally conceived by the German-based Howaldtswerke-Deutsche Werft, were proposed to be built at Mazagon Dock Shipbuilders (MDL), located in Mumbai, with the assistance of a foreign naval firm in a corroborative role.

In accordance with the scheme, the IN and MDL approached several naval enterprises for assistance; however, the French-based Thomson-CSF (TCSF) was the only firm willing to participate. Two years later, in 1999, the MoD approved a two-phase plan to build 24 submarines over a 30-year period. For the first phase, which called for the construction of SSKs at MDL, two options were proposed: the former option recommending the construction of the Type 209/1500 at MDL with the assistance of TCSF; the latter option recommending the construction of SSKs based on the newer Scorpène submarine design, conceived by the French-based Armaris (later DCNS, now Naval Group).

Ultimately, the IN chose the latter, reasoning that the Scorpène, which had been offered with a provision of technology transfer (TOT), was more advanced than the Type 209/1500. Another reason for choosing the Scorpène design was because of the IN's interest in acquiring submarine-launched missiles. At the time, the French-designed Exocet, the US-designed Harpoon and the Russian-designed Kalibr were the only such missiles that were commercially obtainable; however, the Harpoon was unavailable to the IN and the Kalibr was incompatible with the Type 209/1500's torpedo tubes. This led to the Exocet being preferred and subsequently, the Scorpène design. It was also thought that the Scorpène design won the deal because of its capability to fire Exocet anti-ship missiles and an agreement on the air-independent propulsion (AIP).

=== Order ===
On 6 October 2005, India signed a series of contracts for transfer of technology to construct six submarines at MDL with Armaris, along with the supply of SM39 Exocet missiles manufactured by MBDA. DCN International was designated as the prime contractor in partnership with Navantia. Armaris was responsible for supply of combat systems and technical advisors for construction of submarines at MDL. Valued at a then-total cost of €2.4 billion, the deal included a 30% offset clause and a delivery timeline wherein the six ordered units were to be delivered between 2012 and 2017.

=== Add-on programme ===
On 10 July 2023, the Indian Navy formally proposed the plans to acquisition of three additional submarines to the Ministry of Defence along with the same for 26 Rafale M aircraft. On 13 July, the Defence Acquisition Council (DAC), headed by the Defence Minisiter Rajnath Singh, of India granted the Acceptance of Necessity (AoN) for the add-on submarine and fighter aircraft projects for the Navy. On 11 August, Mazagon Dockyard was officially approached for the project.

In December 2023, MDL submitted a bid to construct the three submarines, equipped with higher measures of indigenously developed technology along with an AIP module for enhanced underwater endurance. By June 2024, the price negotiations for the project were at advanced stages. Initially, the bid was sent back by the Navy since the cost estimate had exceeded ₹50,000 crore (equivalent to ₹550 billion or US$5.7 billion in 2026). The entire upgraded combat management system for the proposed submarines would be indigenously developed by Bharat Electronics Limited. The first submarine shall be delivered after six years of contract signing.

As of 13 January 2025, the deal worth ₹38,000 crore (equivalent to ₹390 billion or US$4.1 billion in 2026) would be cleared by the Cabinet Committee on Security (CCS) by early February while the contract could be signed during the visit of the Indian Prime Minister Narendra Modi to France on 11 and 12 February. As per a report on 9 February, the final cost of the project was around ₹36,000 crore (equivalent to ₹370 billion or US$3.9 billion in 2026) post cost negotiations, excluding the cost of the air-independent propulsion systems. The project was being pursued under the Buy (Indian) category of Defence Acquisition Procedure (DAP) 2020.

The high costs for the three P-75 (add-on) submarines were attributed to their relatively larger size, similar to Riachuelo-class submarine of the Brazilian Navy, and a higher indigenous content of 60% which is twice of the initial batch of submarines. Moreover, the submarines will have double the mission endurance with higher accommodations, increased food and water storage, and expanded sanitary and oil storage facilities as well as double armament storage and is also expected to configure additional weapons. Additionally, the diesel generators, with 20% improved efficiency and reduced lower vacuum build-up while snorting, will be sourced from a different firm and the electric motors will be upgraded to operate at lower power consumption and ease maintenance. The design also incorporates improved stealth capabilities with reduced infrared signatures.

Though the cost negotiations were completed with the documents submitted by 7 July 2025, a report on 27 July suggested that the Indian Navy has proposed a follow-on deal for three Project-75 (India) submarines instead of pursuing the P-75 (add-on) programme for three upgraded Scorpène-class submarines. If approved by the CCS, the P-75(I) follow-on deal could be finalised within a year of the original P-75(I) contract, which would be finalised by fiscal year 2025–26. As a result, no further orders for Scorpène submarines are anticipated. The Navy favours the P-75(I) class due to its superior stealth, advanced capabilities, and the lack of an operational AIP system in the Scorpène, which is based on an older-generation design.

A report published on 14 October states that the Indian Navy considered the P-75I design a generation ahead of the Scorpène. While the government had not officially "scrapped" the deal yet, the project is not being pursued as per a top government official. The Navy is "not keen" in the deal as of March 2026, though Naval Group has re-affirmed its support to the project.

On 13 October 2026, Hindustan Times reported that the deal was again accelerated with a cost estimate of ₹33,000 crore (US$3.4 billion) and that a modified proposal is being prepared for the Prime Minister-led CCS. The "evolved Kalvari" will feature NATO standard and DRDO developed torpedoes alongside SCALP submarine-launched missiles. Initially, they will be fitted with lead-acid batteries (LAB) which can be replaced by more efficient lithium ion batteries (LIB) during refit. This will allow India to lease out submarines or construct them at 100% ToT to friendly foreign countries. The proposal was revived after the P-75I was delayed, pending the validation of DRDO's AIP modules despite TKMS being ready to supply the same for the submarines.

== Construction ==
=== 2006–07 ===
The steel cutting for the first submarine, the Kalvari, commenced on 14 December 2006, with its hull construction beginning on 23 May 2007. However, work stalled when public disclosures revealed that the 2005 agreement had omitted the procurement of specific components, including engines, generator and raw materials. The issue prompted the MoD to establish a public entity, the Mazagaon Procured Materials (MPM), to directly procure the aforementioned materials. Protracted negotiations between the MoD and DCNS for the components lead to the additional sanctioning of ₹4,764 crore (equivalent to ₹120 billion or US$1.2 billion in 2026) by the CCS, which further delayed the project by two years.

=== 2010–19 ===
In 2011, The project suffered another setback following a breach and flooding at MDL's dockyard in which components, including sections of the already fabricated hull of at least one of the six units, were submerged under seawater; however, the incident was dismissed by the IN as a "minor obstacle".

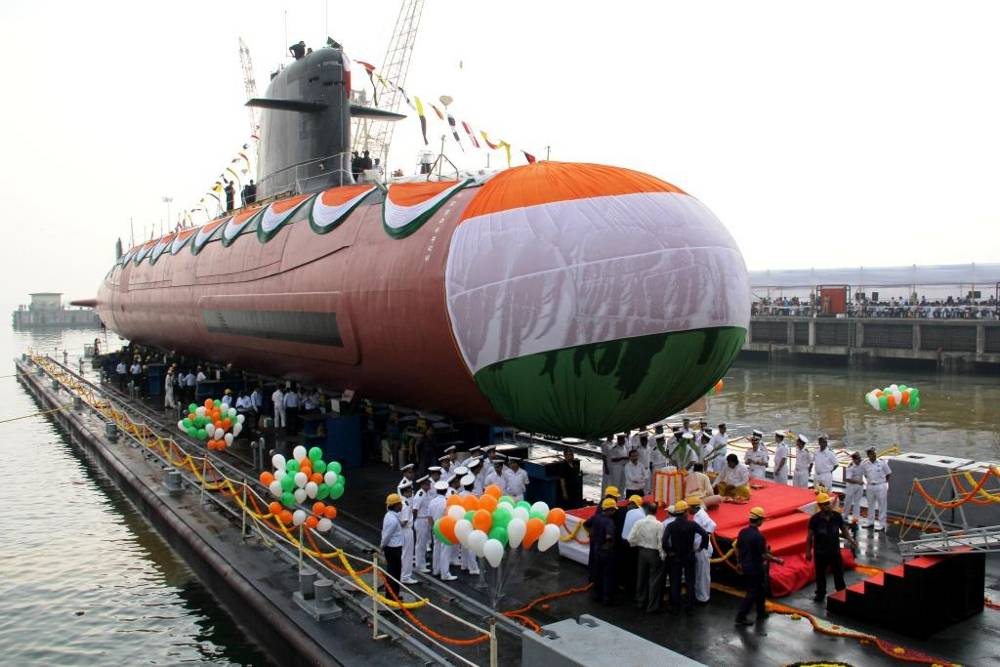
The launch of the lead unit, the Kalvari, in 2015

In 2015, the project suffered further delays after Navantia exited the project. After eight years in construction, Kalvari was finally launched in October 2015 and commenced sea trials a year later, on 1 May 2016.

In June 2016, initial plans to purchase ninety-eight Black Shark torpedoes from the Italian-based munitions manufacturer Whitehead Alenia Sistemi Subacquei (WASS) were cancelled in response to corruption allegations against WASS's sister company, AgustaWestland. Although alternatives, such as the SeaHake torpedoes from Germany's Atlas Elektronik and the F21 torpedoes France's Naval Group were considered, the MoD resorted to installing its existing inventory of older AEG SUT 264 torpedoes on the submarines as a stopgap measure.

The second unit, the Khanderi, was launched in January 2017, which was soon followed by the commissioning of Kalvari in December 2017. The third and fourth units, the Karanj and the Vela respectively, were launched between January 2018 and May 2019, while Khanderi was commissioned in September 2019.

The AIP programme began in June 2017, at a cost of ₹270 crore (equivalent to ₹413 crore or US$43 million in 2026).

=== 2020–23 ===
The fifth unit, the Vagir, was launched in November 2020, while Karanj and Vela were commissioned between March and November 2021, respectively.

The sixth and final unit of the class, the Vagsheer, was launched in April 2022, which was soon followed by the commissioning of Vagir in January 2023. The same month, India's Naval Materials Research Laboratory (NMRL) and Naval Group reached an agreement to integrate NMRL's locally developed AIP technology into the six submarines. Vagsheer commenced its first sea sortie in May 2023, with delivery scheduled for early 2024. On 22 June, Larsen & Toubro signed a contract with DRDO for the construction of two units of AIP system modules for the Kalvari class.

=== 2024–25 ===
February 2024: The Defence Acquisition Council (DAC) granted an Acceptance of Necessity (AoN) in February 2024 for the purchase of forty-eight heavyweight torpedoes for the submarines under a global tender as a stopgap measure until an indigenous option, supposedly a submarine-launched version of Varunastra torpedo, becomes available.

September 2024: On 14 September, the Indian Navy commissioned the Kalvari Submarine Escape Training Facility, Vinetra, at INS Satavahana, Visakhapatnam to train personnel in escape procedures during a distress situation. The facility was constructed by Larsen & Toubro and is equipped with a five-metre (16 ft) escape tower integrated with an adjacent diving basin.

December 2024: On 30 December, the Indian Ministry of Defence signed two contracts with Mazagon Dock Limited (MDL) and Naval Group, France for upgrades related to the Kalvari-class submarines. The first contract, the one signed with MDL [worth ₹1,990 crore (equivalent to ₹21 billion or US$220 million in 2026)], is for the construction and integration of AIP Plug into the submarines, while the second contract signed with Naval Group [worth ₹877 crore (equivalent to ₹934 crore or US$97 million in 2026)] is for the integration of indigenous Electronic Heavy Weight Torpedo (EHWT) systems.

January–March 2025: The final submarine, INS Vagsheer, commissioned on 15 January. On 18 March, MDL announced the commencement of production plate cutting for AIP plugs under the contract signed earlier to retrofit air-independent propulsion modules into the submarines.

April 2025: Italy's Black Shark torpedo was reportedly the frontrunner for the 48 heavyweight torpedo tender. Meanwhile, Germany's ThyssenKrupp Marine Systems exited the tender and France's Naval Group offer was higher priced. The project is a revival of the Navy's 98 torpedo procurement in 2008–09, which was dropped in 2013 due to a corruption scandal.

July 2025: Naval Group and Mazagon Dockyard signed a formal agreement on 23 July in order to support the integration of DRDO's AIP system, referred to as the indigenous energy system plugs. The agreement follows the contract signed with MDL on 30 December 2024 for the same purpose. Following the agreement, the submarines will undergo Jumboisation — which involves precision cutting of the hull, plug insertion and re-joining of the hull. Naval Group, as the Original Equipment Manufacturer (OEM), will provide technical oversight, proprietary materials as well as specialised training to MDL's engineers. The firm will also ensure seamless integration and safe and operational submarine following the procedure.

August 2025: It was reported on 4 August that the DRDO-developed AIP plug was still not ready for integration onto the submarines. As a result, Kalvari's maiden maintenance refit, which is underway, will be completed without being retrofitted with the AIP system. The system is now expected to be ready before the scheduled maintenance refit of the second submarine, Khanderi, during mid-2026. The energy module is expected to be ready by December 2025.

30 December 2025: The defence ministry signed a deal worth ₹1,896 crore (equivalent to ₹20 billion or US$200 million in 2026) with WASS Submarine Systems for the purchase of 48 Black Shark heavyweight torpedoes which will be delivered between April 2028 and 2030.

=== 2026 ===
6 March: Reports confirmed that Khanderi will be the first submarine to be equipped with the AIP system. The DRDO expects to deliver the Energy Module to the Navy within three to four months. The refit is scheduled from July 2026 and the integration is expected to take three months and will be completed by December 2026. This would be followed by initial sea trials commencing in July–August 2027 with the full refit process to conclude by early-2028. The systems has already reached advanced stages of trials.

13 March: Naval Group India commissioned Pneumatic RAM test facility at its technical workshop in Karwar in the presence of Vice Admiral B. Sivakumar, the Chief of Materiel of the Indian Navy. The facility will be used to test, maintain and service critical pneumatic systems installed on Kalvari-class submarines. The facility was earlier established only in France and Brazil which meant the servicing required to be sent to France implying more turnaround timeline as well as higher logistical costs.

== Design ==
=== Hull ===
A silhouette profile of the design's hull, barring air-independent propulsion

The Kalvari class is capable of offensive operations across the entire spectrum of naval warfare including anti-surface warfare, anti-submarine warfare, intelligence gathering, mine laying and area surveillance. They have a length of 67.5 m (221 ft 5 in), height of 12.3 m (40 ft 4 in), overall beam of 6.2 m (20 ft 4 in) and a draught of 5.8 m (19 ft 0 in). They can reach a top speed of 20 knots (37 km/h; 23 mph) when submerged and a maximum speed of 11 knots (20 km/h; 13 mph) when surfaced. Each submarine has a complement of 8 officers and 35 sailors.

The hull, fin and hydroplanes are designed for minimum underwater resistance and all equipment inside the pressure hull is mounted on shock absorbing cradles for enhanced stealth. Special steel was used in its construction which has high tensile strength, capable of withstanding high yield stress and hydro-static force. Each submarine has 60 km (37 mi) of cabling and 11 km (6.8 mi) of piping.

The class displaces 1,615 tonnes (1,589 long tons) when surfaced and 1,775 t (1,747 long tons) when submerged.

=== Propulsion ===
The submarine is powered by two 1,250 kW MAN diesel engines, which are complemented 360 battery cells (750 kg, 1,650 lb each) that powers a Permanently Magnetised Propulsion Motor for extremely-silent underwater operation, thus allowing it have an operational range of around 6,500 nautical miles (12,000 km; 7,500 mi) at 8 knots (15 km/h; 9.2 mph) when surfaced.

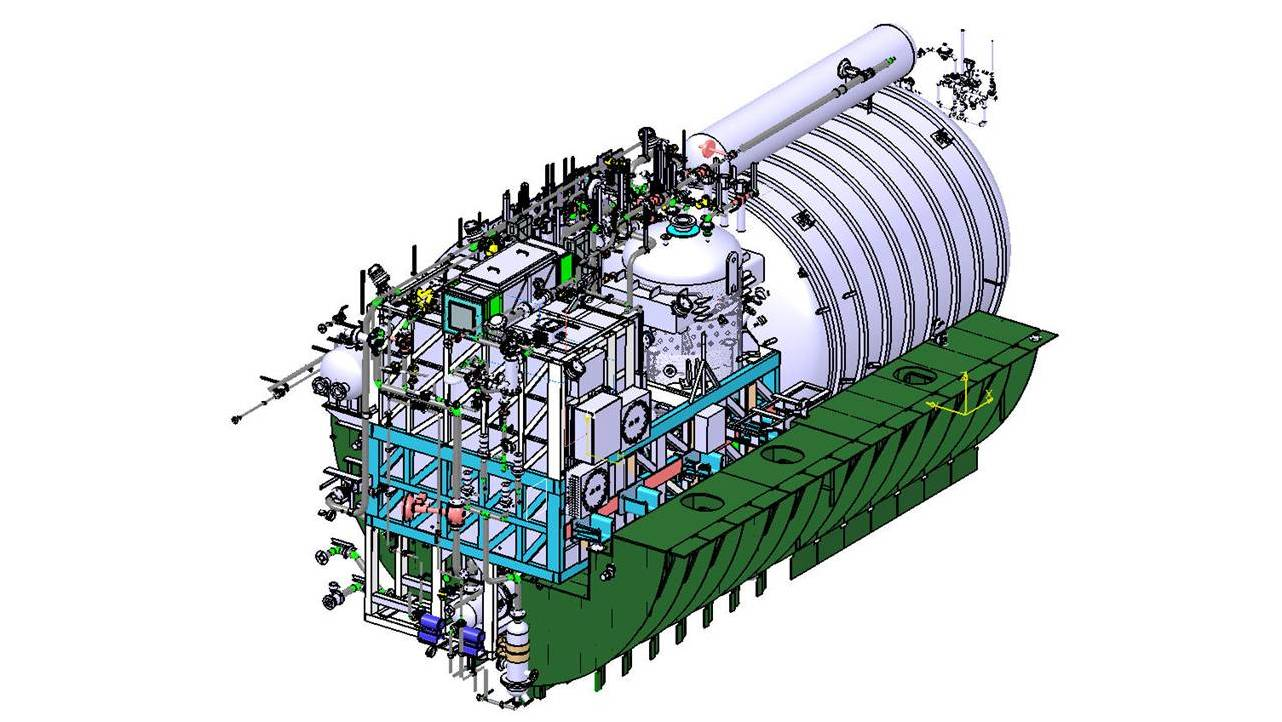
A visual of the NMRL-design air-independent propulsion module that is to be equipped on the submarines

The six submarines are expected to retro-fitted with an DRDO-developed AIP module during their respective mid-life refits. The retrofit will involve cutting the submarine’s pressure hull and inserting a new hull section housing the air-independent propulsion system or the Energy Module. This increases the submarine’s overall length and displacement. On 30 December 2024, Mazagon Dock received a contract, worth ₹1,990 crore (equivalent to ₹21 billion or US$220 million in 2026), for the fabrication of AIP Plug and its integration into the submarines. This requires some design changes in the submarines which will be conducted by the Naval Group.

The refit of the Kalvari was scheduled from September 2025. However, the development was delayed and Khanderi will be the first submarine to be equipped with the AIP system. The DRDO expects to deliver the Energy Module to the Navy within three to four months. The refit scheduled from July 2026 and the integration is expected to take three months and will be completed by December 2026. This would be followed by initial sea trials commencing in July–August 2027 with the full refit process to conclude by early-2028. The system has already reached advanced stages of trials.

As of 2025, it is planned to issue the first AIP cell to INS Khanderi during its refit in December 2026. Following that, the first sailing would begin by April 2027 and the refitting process will be concluded by July 2027.

The Naval Materials Research Laboratory (NMRL) is the primary designing agency, with Larsen & Toubro (L&T) being the development and production partner and Thermax as an industry partner. The Energy Modules are the core component of the AIP system. The modules are composed of phosphoric acid fuel cells (PAFC) and the on-board Hydrogen generation system. The hydrogen generation system excludes the need of hydrogen storage and the by-product is non-polluted water which is to be released into the oceans. This feature is unique to this design. The overall AIP is a stack of 24 phosphoric acid fuel cells (PAFC) with each cell generating 13.5 kW (18.1 hp) of power. The design results in a power output which is greater than the overall requirement. The system will provide an enhanced submerged endurance of about 14 days in endurance mode and 2 days in power mode. However, without the AIP system, the maximum endurance of the Kalvari design is two to four days.

=== Armament ===
This class is equipped with six 533 mm (21 in) weapon launching tubes. A total of 18 weapons can be carried with a combination of heavyweight German-origin SUT torpedo and SM39 Exocet anti-ship missiles. In place of torpedoes and missiles, 30 mines can be carried.

On 30 December 2024, the Naval Group was contracted to integrate DRDO developed EHWT Takshak on the submarines. The defence ministry signed a deal to acquire 48 Black Shark heavyweight torpedoes from WASS Submarine Systems. Deliveries are expected between April 2028 and 2030.

The High Energy Materials Research Laboratory (HEMRL) based in Pune of DRDO has also developed the Signal Star Naval Flare, an underwater signalling device, for the class of submarines. The flare system has been designed to be stored in a pressure-resistant casing and as and when required, launched from the submarine's signal ejector travel through the water column and activate on reaching the surface. After activating the flare would ignite a high-intensity pyrotechnic charge, by following a hydrostatic mechanism, to produce a bright, star-like light making it visible from long distances even in night or adverse weather conditions. The flare light is available in two colours — either brilliant red or green star signals — while its deployment depends on tactical requirements. The fully indigenised system was handed over to the Director General of Naval Armament Inspection (DG-NAI) on 29 August 2025.

=== Sensors ===
The class is also fitted with mobile C303/S anti-torpedo decoys for self-defence. The weapon systems and sensors are integrated with Submarine Tactical Integrated Combat System (SUBTICS). It has a sonar system is capable of Low Frequency Analysis and Ranging (LOFAR) enabling long range detection and classification.

== 2016 information leak ==
In mid-August 2016, The Australian newspaper published documents containing old technical information about the Scorpène submarines and reported that design details of the Scorpène-class submarine and other ships had been leaked. The leaked information spreads over 22,400 pages and includes detailed information about the submarine's combat and stealth capabilities. The leak also included information about noise levels, submarine frequencies and more. Despite all the information leaks, Indian Navy Chief, Admiral Sunil Lanba, was quoted as saying that the leaks were being viewed "very seriously", but were "not a matter of much worry". The report also suggested that an ex-French Navy officer working as a sub-contractor for Naval Group may have been the source of the leak, and that the leaked data may have been written in France in 2011. However, on 30 August 2016, a court in New South Wales temporarily banned The Australian from releasing any more confidential data on the Indian Scorpène-class submarines.

Naval Group filed a complaint against the newspaper with the Supreme Court of the State of New South Wales in Australia. The Australian court ruled in favour of Naval Group on 29 August and confirmed its decision on 1 September.

== Operational history ==
In June 2023, Vagir was deployed on an extended patrol in the Indian Ocean. As a part of the deployment, the submarine reached Colombo, Sri Lanka, on 19 June 2023. Then, it covered nearly 7,000 kilometres (4,300 mi) to reach Fremantle, Australia, on 20 August 2023. This was the first time that a submarine of this class was on a long-range deployment.

On 24 March 2024, a Kalvari-class submarine reached Campbell Bay, the southernmost port of India in the Nicobar Islands, for the first time.

Three of these submarines were deployed alongside the aircraft carrier INS Vikrant along with seven frontline warships and three other submarines (Shishumar class and Sindhughosh classes) on 7 November 2024. The operations included carrier operations of MiG-29K aircraft, missile firing drills, submarine manoeuvres and flypasts by 30 aircraft demonstrated to the President of India Droupadi Murmu who was present on board Vikrant.

In an incident on 22 November 2024, a submarine of the Kalvari class collided with a fishing boat about 70 nautical miles (130 km; 81 mi) off the coast of Goa. The Navy rescued 11 fishermen before their boat sank. Two fishermen were reported missing, with the Navy and Coast Guard deploying various ships to locate them.

== Ships of the class ==
Name	Pennant	Yard	Builder	Launched	Commissioned	Ref.	Status
Kalvari	S21	11875	Mazagon Dock Limited	27 October 2015	14 December 2017		Under Refit
Khanderi	S22	11876	Mazagon Dock Limited	12 January 2017	28 September 2019		Active
Karanj	S23	11877	Mazagon Dock Limited	31 January 2018	10 March 2021		Active
Vela	S24	11878	Mazagon Dock Limited	6 May 2019	25 November 2021		Active
Vagir	S25	11879	Mazagon Dock Limited	12 November 2020	23 January 2023		Active
Vagsheer	S26	11880	Mazagon Dock Limited	20 April 2022	15 January 2025		Active

== Gallery ==
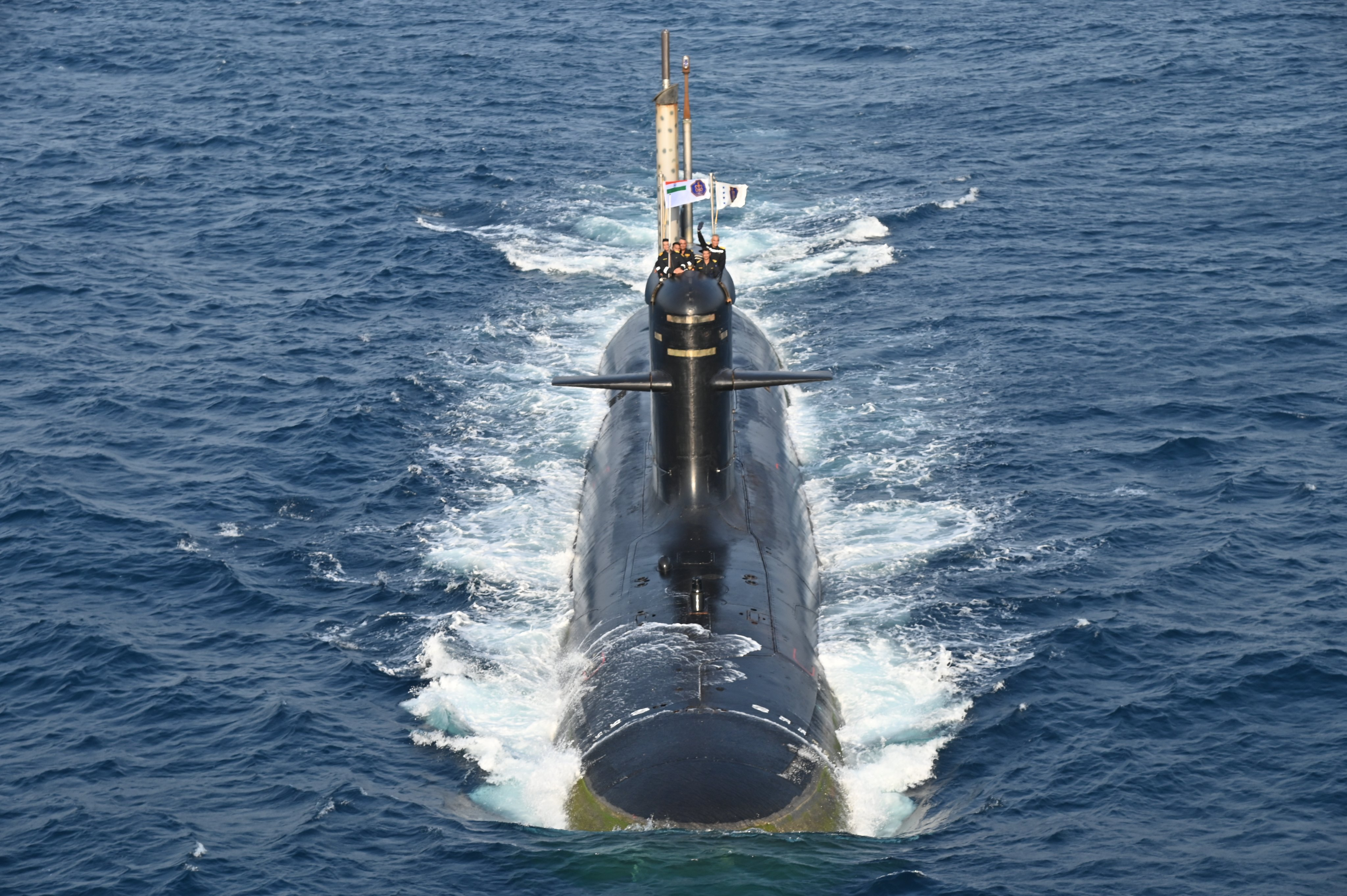
A Kalvari-class submarine up close during an exercise

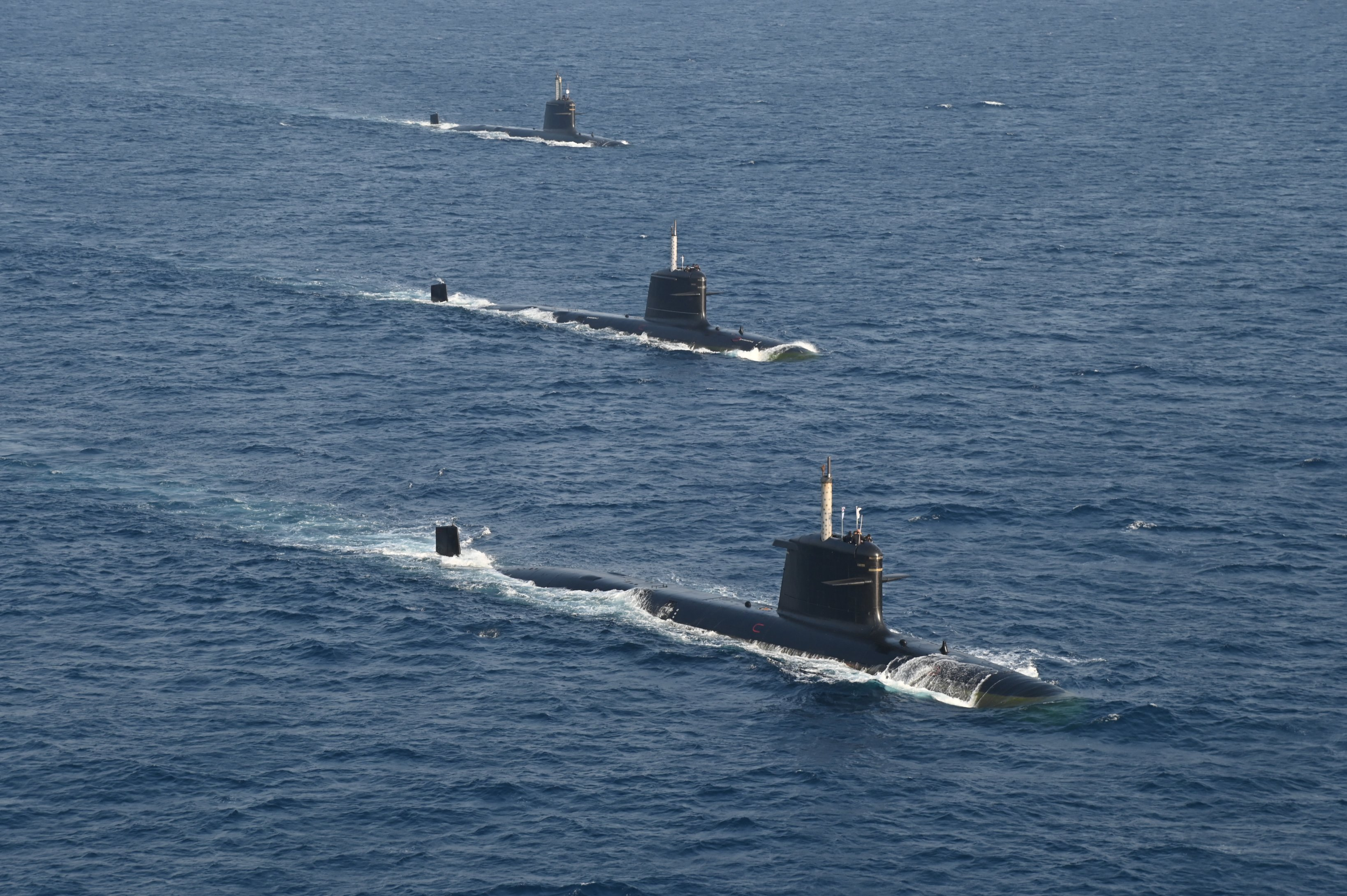
A trio of Kalvari-class submarines during an exercise

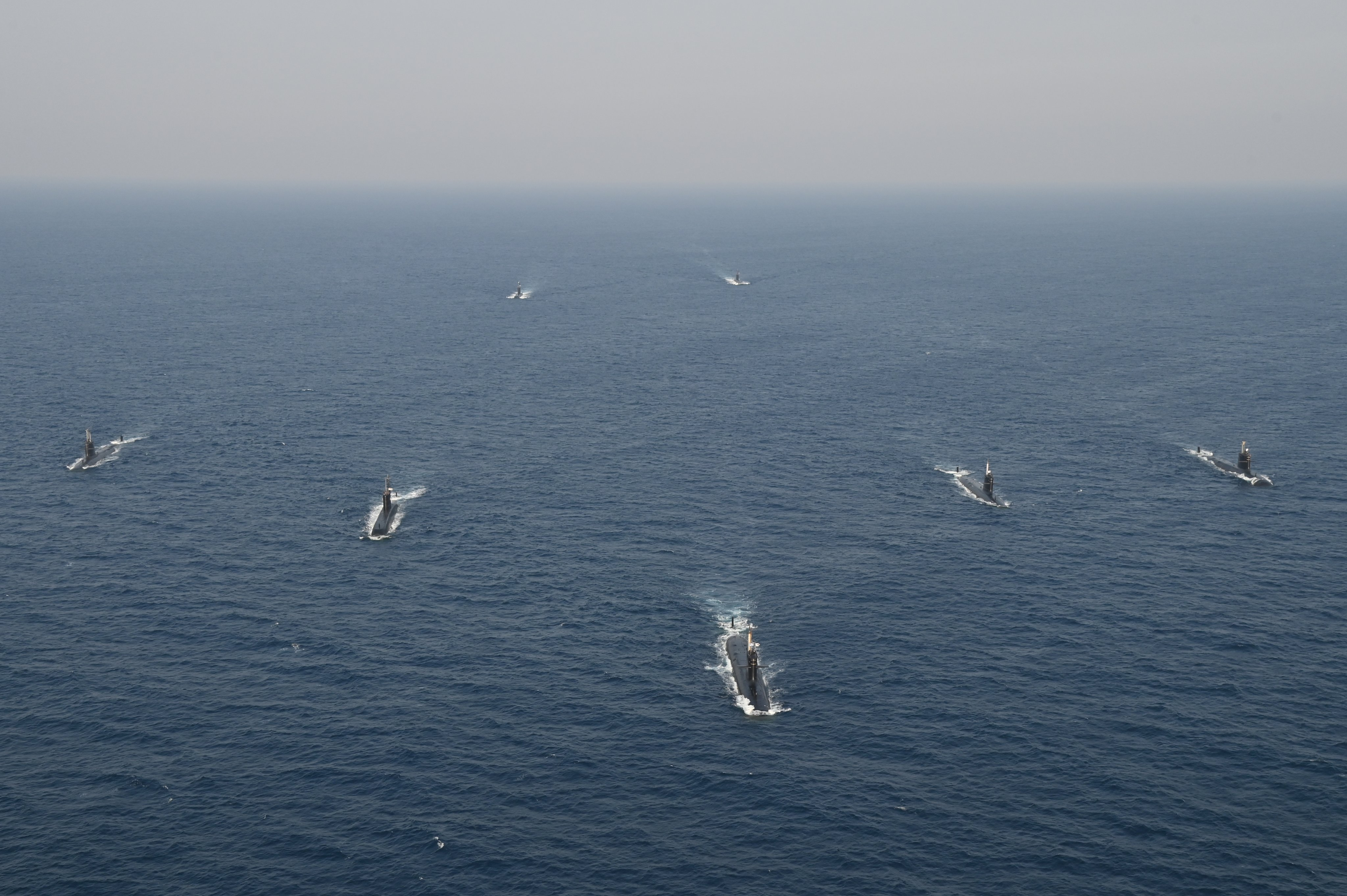
A Kalvari-class and Shishumar-class submarine during an exercise

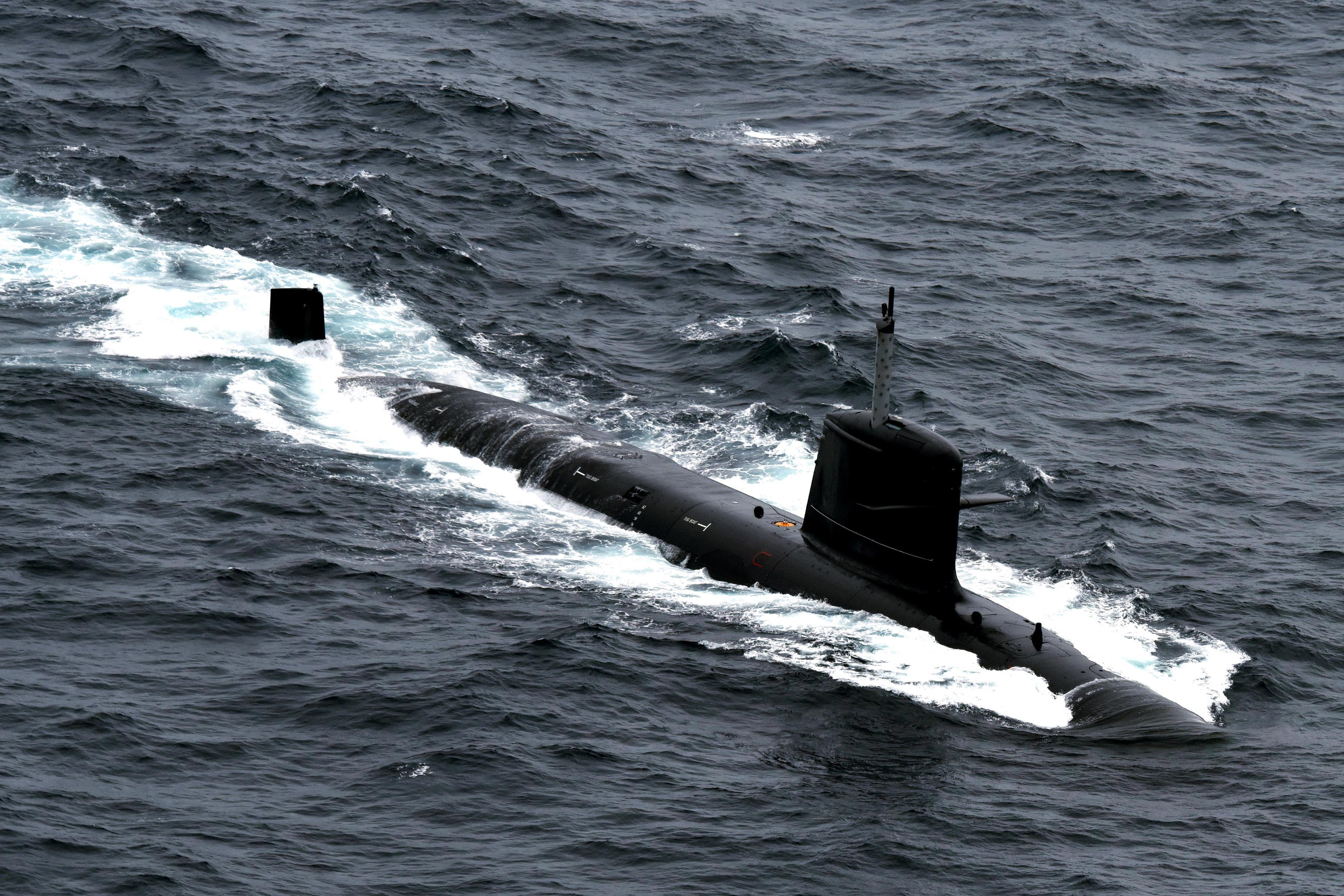
Khanderi at sea

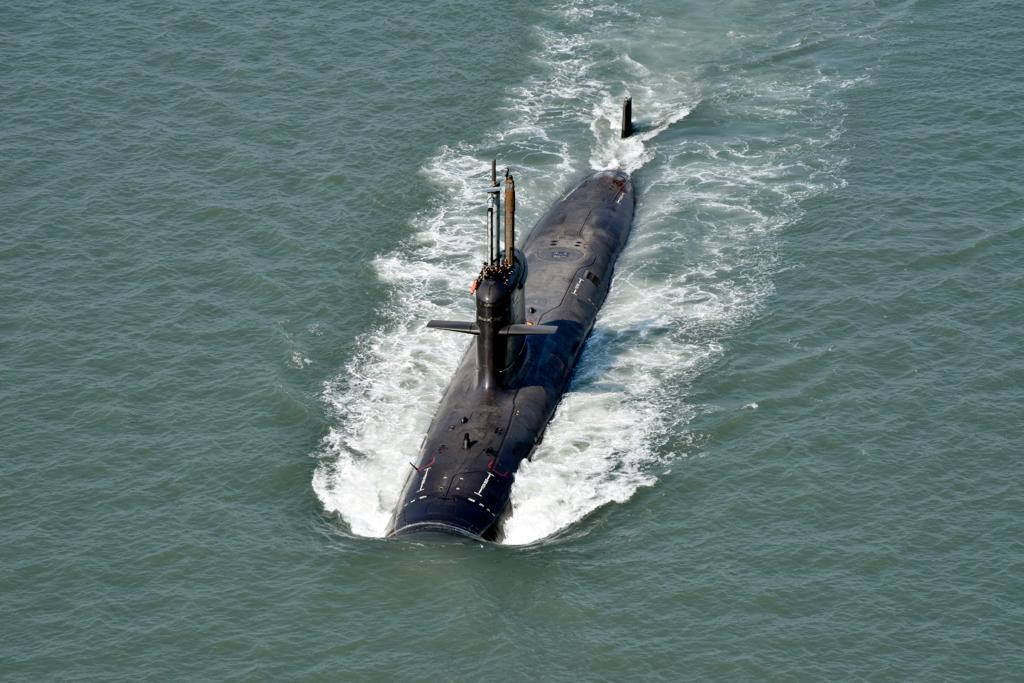
Vela during sea trials

Vagir

== See also ==
- List of submarines of the Indian Navy

Equivalent submarines of the same era

- U212 NFS
- Invincible class
- Reis class
- Nagapasa class
