= SUT torpedo =

German torpedo

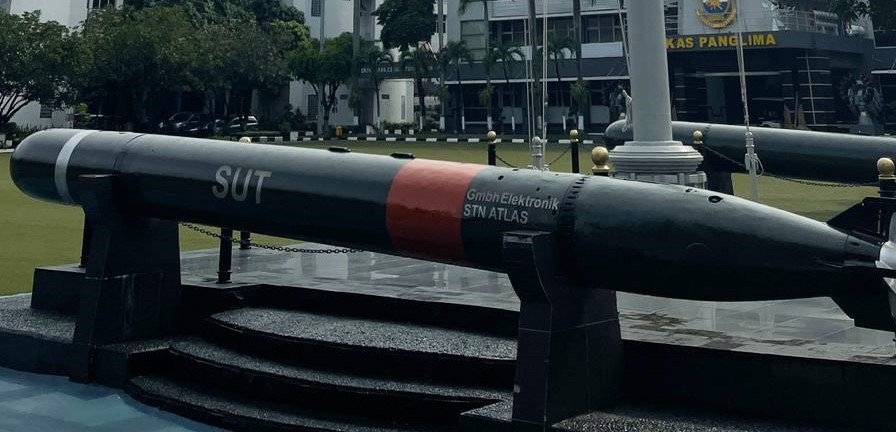
- Type: Heavyweight dual-purpose ASW and ASuW torpedo
- Place of origin: West Germany / Germany (since 1990)

Service history
- In service: 1980-Present

Production history
- Manufacturer: Atlas Elektronik
- Variants: Mod 1, Mod 2

Specifications
- Mass: 1,419 kilograms (3,128 lb)
- Diameter: 533 mm
- Maximum firing range: 30 kilometres (16 nmi)
- Warhead weight: 259 kilograms (571 lb)
- Detonation mechanism: Proximity or contact detonation
- Engine: Electrical batteries
- Maximum speed: 35 knots (65 km/h)
- Guidance system: Wire-guided with autonomous active terminal homing sonar

The AEG SUT 264 is a West Germany / German (since 1990) dual-purpose 21 inch heavyweight wire-guided torpedo produced by Atlas Elektronik, which entered service in 1980. The torpedo is primarily produced for export and has been sold to numerous countries.

== Description ==
SUT stands for Surface and Underwater Target. It is a dual-purpose weapon that can be launched from surface ships, submarines, and shore positions.

=== Mod 2 ===
The SUT Mod 2 has as special feature that it can send additional data, including audio, from the homing head back to the vessel it launched from. It has been compared favorably to the Chinese Yu-4 and Yu-6.

== Production ==
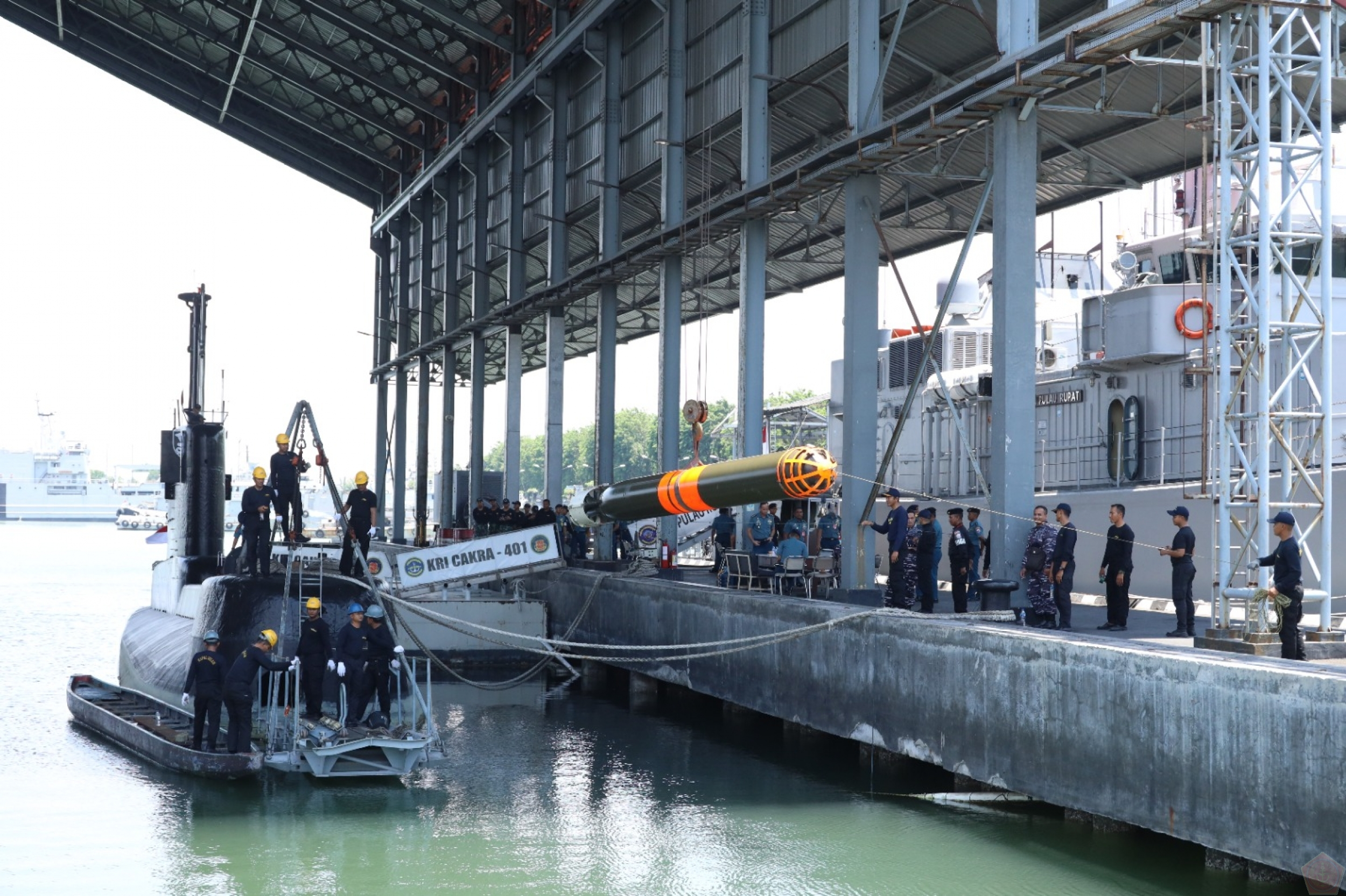
Loading of SUT Torpedo into Indonesian navy submarine, KRI Cakra (401).

In 1986 Indonesia signed a contract to obtain a license for long-term indigenous production of the SUT torpedo. A production line was set up in Indonesia with the cooperation of the Indonesian Navy and Indonesian Aerospace. Taiwan received 200 torpedoes from this production line in 1998.

== Service history ==
=== Chile ===
In 2004 the Chilean Scorpène-class submarine O'Higgins fired a SUT while running at depth during its acceptance tests off Lorient, France.

=== India ===
In 2013 OEM Atlas Elektronik was contracted to upgrade the 64 SUTs remaining in Indian service.

The SUT was the first torpedo fired by the Kalvari-class submarine because of a lack of procurement of planned heavyweight torpedoes. A planned purchase of Black Shark torpedoes fell through because their manufacturer Finmeccanica was blacklisted by the Indian government for procurement corruption.

=== Taiwan ===
The SUT was originally procured along with the two Hai Lung-class submarines. The torpedoes were procured from the Indonesian production line. In addition to money Taiwan exchanged landing craft and 100,000 tons of rice for the torpedoes.

On September 4, 2003 a war shot SUT fired by a submarine during the Hankuang No. 19 training exercise broke its control wires and went out of control. The torpedo was recovered four hours later from a Yilan County beach. Representatives of the manufacturer traveled to Taiwan to participate in the incident investigation. On October 8 the Navy tested a second torpedo with satisfactory results. On October 14 the Navy held a full test in Pingtung County, the first torpedo experienced similar problems to the one on September 4 but the issue was resolved and a second torpedo successfully destroyed the target, a decommissioned Yang-class destroyer.

In 2010 the Taiwanese Navy offered a reward to local fishermen for the recovery of a training SUT lost during an exercise. The SUT will be replaced by the Mk 48 torpedo in Taiwanese service.

== Users ==
- Chilean Navy
- Colombian Navy
- Ecuadorian Navy
- Egyptian Navy
- Hellenic Navy
- Indian Navy
- Indonesian Navy
- South Korean Navy
- South African Navy
- Republic of China Navy
- Peruvian Navy

== See also ==
- SST torpedo
