= Phosphoric acid fuel cell =

Type of fuel cell

Diagram of a phosphoric acid fuel cell

Phosphoric acid fuel cells (PAFC) are a type of fuel cell that uses liquid phosphoric acid as an electrolyte. They were the first fuel cells to be commercialized. Developed in the mid-1960s and field-tested since the 1970s, they have improved significantly in stability, performance, and cost. Such characteristics have made the PAFC a good candidate for early stationary applications.

== Design ==
Electrolyte is highly concentrated or pure liquid phosphoric acid (H_{3}PO_{4}) saturated in a silicon carbide (SiC) matrix. Operating range is about 150 to 210 °C. The electrodes are made of carbon paper coated with a finely dispersed platinum catalyst.

== Electrode reactions ==
Anode reaction: 2H_{2}(g) → 4H^{+} + 4e

Cathode reaction: O_{2}(g) + 4H^{+} + 4e‾ → 2H_{2}O

Overall cell reaction: 2 H_{2} + O_{2} → 2H_{2}O

== Advantages and disadvantages ==
At an operating range of 150 to 200 °C, the expelled water can be converted to steam for air and water heating (combined heat and power). This potentially allows efficiency increases of up to 70%. PAFCs are CO_{2}-tolerant and can tolerate a CO concentration of about 1.5%, which broadens the choice of fuels they can use. If gasoline is used, the sulfur must be removed. At lower temperatures phosphoric acid is a poor ionic conductor, and CO poisoning of the platinum electro-catalyst in the anode becomes severe. However, they are much less sensitive to CO than proton-exchange membrane fuel cells (PEMFC) and alkaline fuel cells (AFC).

Disadvantages include rather low power density and chemically aggressive electrolyte.

== Applications ==
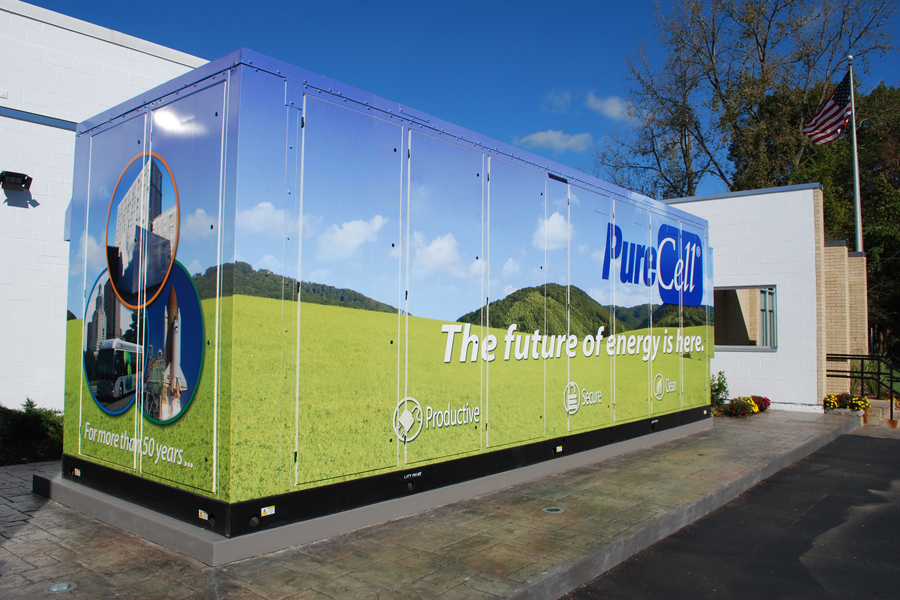
PureCell System 400 CEP

PAFC have been used for stationary power generators with output in the 100 kW to 400 kW range and are also finding application in large vehicles such as buses.

Major manufacturers of PAFC technology include Doosan Fuel Cell America Inc. (formerly ClearEdge Power & UTC Power) and Fuji Electric.

India's DRDO has developed PAFC based air-independent propulsion for integration into their Kalvari-class submarines.

== See also ==
- Glossary of fuel cell terms
