= List of submarines of the Indian Navy =

This is a list of known submarines of the Indian Navy, grouped by class, and pennant numbers within the class.

== In service ==
Nuclear ballistic missile submarine (3)
Class	Image	Boat	No.	Disp. (t)	Comm.	Origin	Homeport	Note
Arihant class		INS Arihant	S2	6,000	2016	India	Visakhapatnam	First ever indigenously-built class of nuclear ballistic missile submarines.
Arihant class		INS Arighaat	S3	6,000	2024	India	Visakhapatnam	First ever indigenously-built class of nuclear ballistic missile submarines.
Arihant class		INS Aridhaman	S4	7,000	2026	India	Visakhapatnam	First ever indigenously-built class of nuclear ballistic missile submarines.
Attack submarine (16)
Class	Image	Boat	No.	Disp. (t)	Comm.	Origin	Homeport	Note
Kalvari class		INS Kalvari	S21	1,800	2017	France; India	Mumbai	Indian-specific variant of the Scorpène-class submarine.
Kalvari class		INS Khanderi	S22	1,800	2019	France; India	Karwar	Indian-specific variant of the Scorpène-class submarine.
Kalvari class		INS Karanj	S23	1,800	2021	France; India	Karwar	Indian-specific variant of the Scorpène-class submarine.
Kalvari class		INS Vela	S24	1,800	2021	France; India	Mumbai	Indian-specific variant of the Scorpène-class submarine.
Kalvari class		INS Vagir	S25	1,800	2023	France; India	Mumbai	Indian-specific variant of the Scorpène-class submarine.
Kalvari class		INS Vagsheer	S26	1,800	2025	France; India	Mumbai	Indian-specific variant of the Scorpène-class submarine.
Sindhughosh class		INS Sindhuraj	S57	3,076	1987	Soviet Union; Russia	Mumbai	Indian-specific variant of the Kilo-class submarine (P.877).
Sindhughosh class		INS Sindhuratna	S59	3,076	1988	Soviet Union; Russia	Mumbai	Indian-specific variant of the Kilo-class submarine (P.877).
Sindhughosh class		INS Sindhukesari	S60	3,076	1988	Soviet Union; Russia	Visakhapatnam	Indian-specific variant of the Kilo-class submarine (P.877).
Sindhughosh class		INS Sindhukirti	S61	3,076	1989	Soviet Union; Russia	Visakhapatnam	Indian-specific variant of the Kilo-class submarine (P.877).
Sindhughosh class		INS Sindhuvijay	S62	3,076	1991	Soviet Union; Russia	Visakhapatnam	Indian-specific variant of the Kilo-class submarine (P.877).
Sindhughosh class		INS Sindhurashtra	S65	3,076	2000	Soviet Union; Russia	Visakhapatnam	Indian-specific variant of the Kilo-class submarine (P.877).
Shishumar class		INS Shishumar	S44	1,850	1986	West Germany; India	Mumbai	Indian-specific variant of the Type 209/1500 submarine.
Shishumar class		INS Shankush	S45	1,850	1986	West Germany; India	Mumbai	Indian-specific variant of the Type 209/1500 submarine.
Shishumar class		INS Shalki	S46	1,850	1992	West Germany; India	Mumbai	Indian-specific variant of the Type 209/1500 submarine.
Shishumar class		INS Shankul	S47	1,850	1994	West Germany; India	Mumbai	Indian-specific variant of the Type 209/1500 submarine.

== Under construction ==
Class	Picture	Type	Boats	Origin	Displacement	Status	Note
Nuclear submarines (11-13)
S5 class		Ballistic missile submarine (SSBN)	4	India	13,500 tonnes	Under construction (2)	Project was approved with a budget of ₹10,000 crore (US$1.0 billion).Construction of two hulls are underway as of December 2025.

== Planned ==
Class	Picture	Type	Boats	Origin	Displacement	Status	Note
Nuclear submarines (11-13)
Project 77		Attack submarine (SSN)	6	India	10,000 tonnes	6 planned	6 boats are planned and are expected to be constructed at the Shipbuilding Centre (SBC) at Visakhapatnam. Project clearance was granted by the Cabinet Committee on Security in February 2015.
Akula class		Attack submarine (SSN)	1	Russia	12,770 tonnes	1 planned	In March 2019, India signed a US$3 billion agreement with Russia to lease another Akula-class submarine, which is expected to join the Indian Navy by 2026.
Diesel-electric submarines (21)
Project 75(I) Class		Attack submarine (SSK)	6	India	3,000-4,000t	6 approved	It had been approved by the government worth ₹43,000 crore in June 2020. The chosen submarine is an modified design of the German Type 214 submarine.
Kalvari class		Attack submarine	3	India/ France	>2,000t	3 planned	New plug module that would give the submarine AIP capability. These units will be larger in size and it is planned that all previous units will be upgraded during their next overhaul cycle.
Project 76 class		Attack submarine	12	India	3,000t	12 planned	Approval from the Cabinet Committee on Security (CCS) due as of February 2025.

== Decommissioned ==
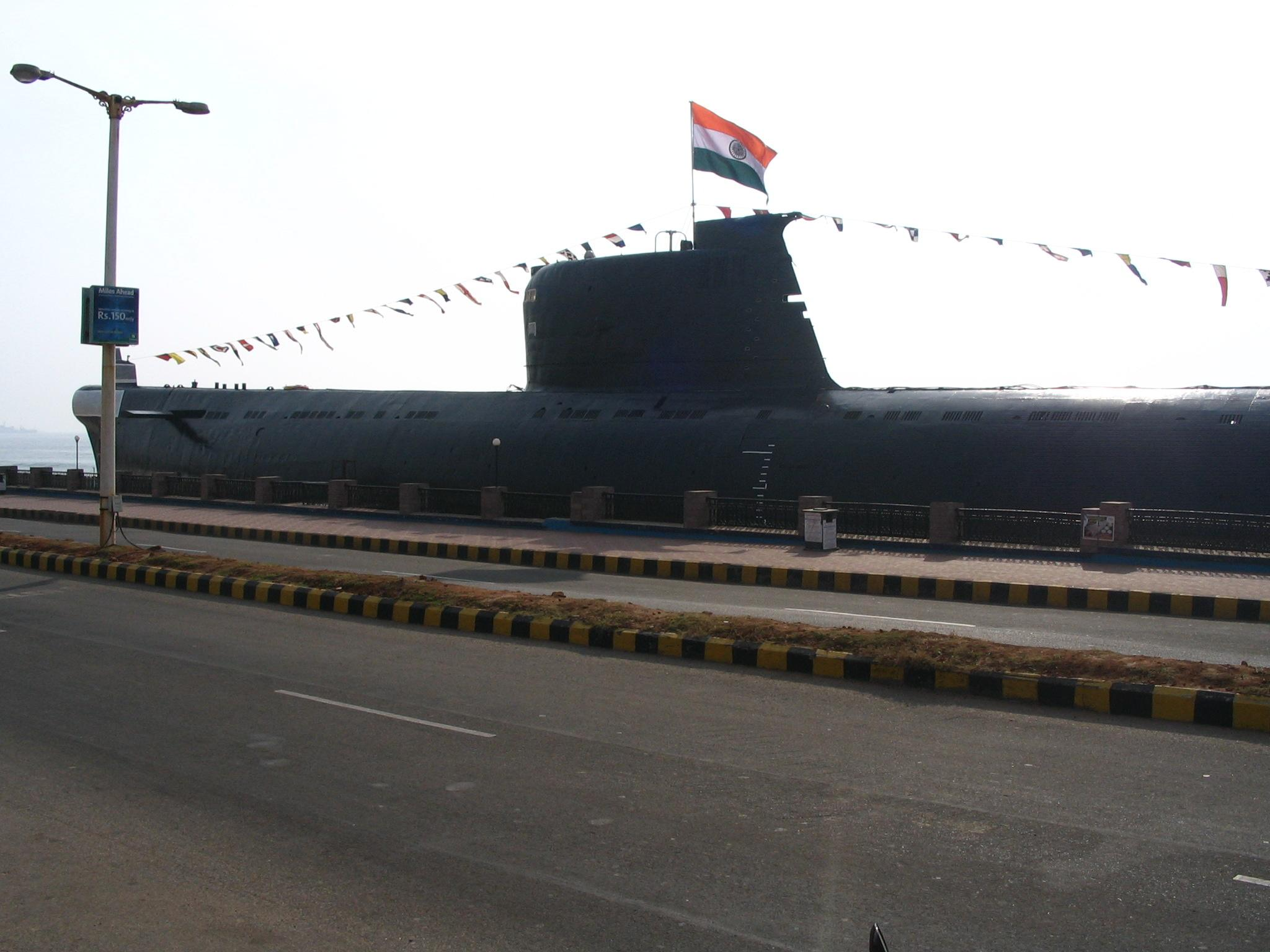
INS Kursura museum ship

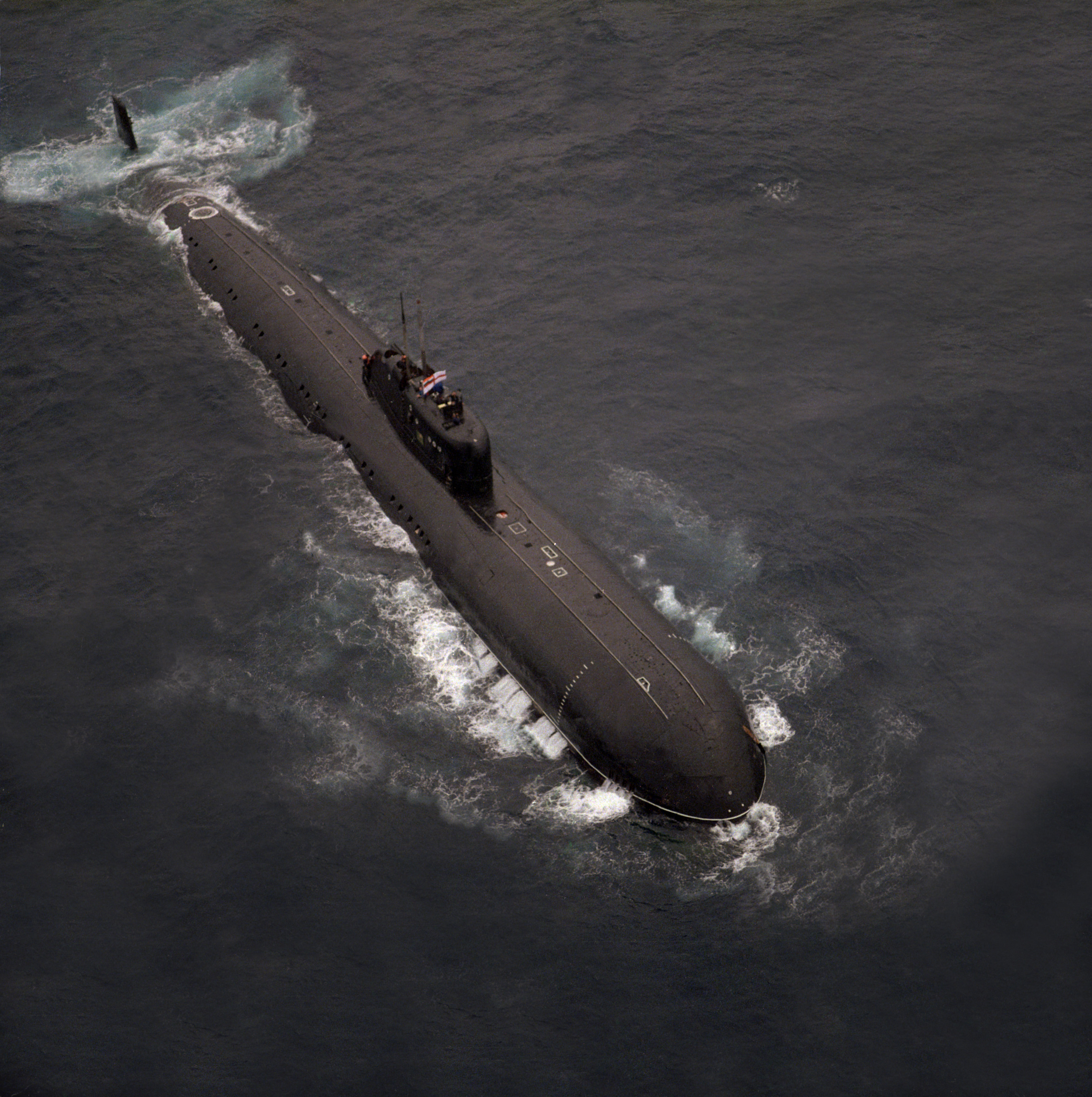
INS Chakra (S71), a leased Soviet Charlie-class nuclear submarine

Boat	Pennant	Class	Commissioned	Decommissioned	Fate	Notes
Nuclear Submarines
INS Chakra	S71	Charlie class	1 September 1987	Returned to Soviet Union in January 1991	Scrapped in Russia.	Leased from the Soviet Union.
INS Chakra	S71	Akula class	4 April 2012	Returned to Russia June 2021		Returned to Russia before 10-year lease completed, due to extensive damage suffered in service.
Conventional Submarines
INS Khanderi	S22	Kalvari class	6 December 1968	18 October 1989	Scrapped but sail fin on display	
INS Kalvari	S23	Kalvari class	8 December 1967	31 May 1996	Scrapped but sail fin on display	
INS Kursura	S20	Kalvari class	18 December 1969	27 September 2001	Converted to Museum Ship at Ramakrishna Mission Beach, Visakhapatnam.	
INS Karanj	S21	Kalvari class	4 September 1969	1 August 2003		
INS Vagsheer	S43	Vela class	26 December 1974	30 April 1997		
INS Vagir	S41	Vela class	3 November 1973	7 June 2001		
INS Vela	S40	Vela class	31 August 1973	25 June 2010		
INS Vagli	S42	Vela class	10 August 1974	9 December 2010	To be preserved as a museum in Tamil Nadu.	
INS Sindhurakshak	S63	Sindhughosh class	24 December 1997	6 March 2017	Sunk	Exploded and sank on 14 August 2013. After being salvaged in June 2014, she was decommissioned in March 2017 and disposed of at sea that June.
INS Sindhuvir	S58	Sindhughosh class	26 August 1988	March 2020	Transferred to Myanmar Navy	
INS Sindhudhvaj	S56	Sindhughosh class	12 June 1987	16 July 2022	Decommissioned	
INS Sindhughosh	S55	Sindhughosh class	30 April 1986	19 December 2025	Decommissioned	

== See also ==
Indian navy related lists

- Aircraft of the Indian Navy
- List of active Indian Navy ships
- List of Indian naval aircraft
- List of Indian Navy bases
- List of ships of the Indian Navy

Indian military related

- India-China Border Roads
- Indian military satellites
- List of active Indian military aircraft
- List of Indian Air Force stations
- India's overseas military bases
- Indian Nuclear Command Authority
