= INS Sindhukirti =

Indian submarine warship

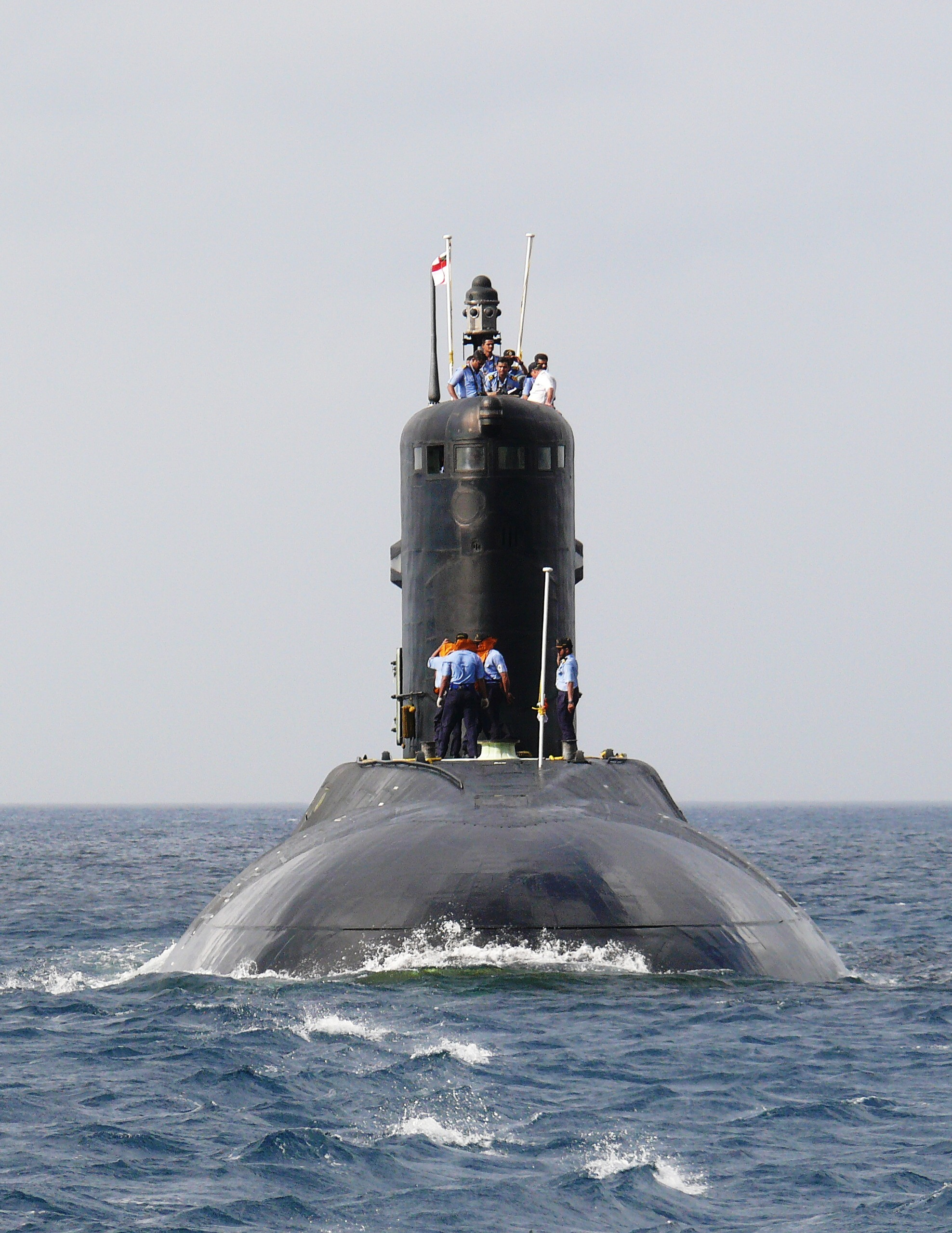
- A Sindhughosh-class submarine underway

History

India
- Name: INS Sindhukirti
- Builder: Admiralty Shipyard and Sevmash
- Launched: 26 August 1989
- Commissioned: 9 December 1989
- Recommissioned: 23 May 2015
- Refit: June 2006 – May 2015
- Status: in active service
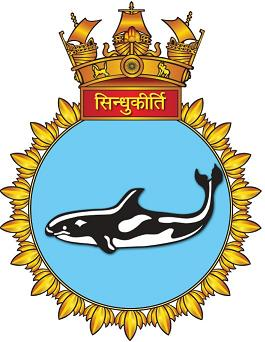
- Badge

General characteristics
- Class & type: Sindhughosh-class submarine
- Displacement: 2,300 t (2,500 short tons) surfaced; 3,100 t (3,400 short tons) dived
- Length: 72.6 m (238 ft)
- Beam: 9.9 m (32 ft)
- Draught: 6.6 m (22 ft)
- Propulsion: 2 × 3,650 hp (2,720 kW) diesel-electric motors; 1 × 5,900 hp (4,400 kW) motor; 2 × 204 hp (152 kW) auxiliary motors; 1 × 130 hp (97 kW) economic speed motor
- Speed: Surfaced; 11 knots (20 km/h); Submerged; 19 knots (35 km/h)
- Range: Snorting: 6,000 mi (9,700 km) at 7 kn (13 km/h); Submerged: 400 miles (640 km) at 3 knots (5.6 km/h)
- Endurance: Up to 45 days
- Test depth: Operational Depth; 240 m (790 ft); Maximum Depth; 300 m (980 ft)
- Complement: 68 (incl. 7 Officers)
- Armament: 9M36 Strela-3 (SA-N-8) SAM launcher; Klub-S (3M-54E) ASCM; Type 53-65 passive wake homing torpedo; TEST 71/76 anti-submarine, active-passive homing torpedo; 24 DM-1 mines in lieu of torpedo tube
- Notes: underwent refit from June 2006 – May 2015 at Hindustan Shipyard

INS Sindhukirti (S61) (lit. 'Glory of the Sea') is the seventh Sindhughosh-class diesel-electric submarine of the Indian Navy. She was built at the Admiralty Shipyard and Sevmash in the Soviet Union.

Sindukirti was commissioned on 9 December 1989 in the Soviet Union, with Cdr. Ramdas executing her commissioning warrant. She underwent a protracted "medium refit" from June 2006 until May 2015 at the Hindustan Shipyard at Visakhapatnam. The midlife upgrade was projected to be completed in 3 years but numerous delays postponed the submarine's return. Having spent one-third of her life in refit, she finally returned to service on 23 May 2015. She participated in the International Fleet Review 2026 in Visakapatanam.

== Description ==
Sindhukiriti has a length of 72.6 m (238 ft) overall, a beam of 9.9 m (32 ft) and a draft of 6.5 m (21 ft). She displaces 2,300 t (2,264 long tons) surfaced, 3,100 t (3,051 long tons) submerged and has a maximum diving depth of 300 m (980 ft). The complement is about 68, including 7 officers and 61 sailors.

The submarine has a shaft with one seven-blade propeller. It is powered by two diesel generators, each of which produce 1,000 kW (1,300 hp). It also has an electric motor with 5,500–6,800 hp (4,100–5,100 kW) of power. She can achieve a maximum speed of 10–12 knots (19–22 km/h) when on surface and 17–25 knots (31–46 km/h) when submerged.

== Operational service and refit ==
INS Sindhukirti was commissioned on 9 December 1989, by Cdr. Kannan Ramdas. She is the seventh of the ten Sindhughosh-class submarines.

=== Midlife Medium refit ===
Sindhukirti was docked at Hindustan Shipyard in June 2006 for a midlife refit which included installation of USHUS sonar and the Klub-S cruise missiles and other hull works. It was originally planned to send her to Russia for the upgrade, like her sister ships Sindhughosh, Sindhuvir, Sindhuratna, and Sindhuvijay. However, it was decided that Sindhukirti would be upgraded indigenously. Hindustan Shipyard was selected for the refit due to political wrangling, against the wishes of the navy staff. HSL had a history of prolonging submarine refits, taking ten years to upgrade each of the Vela-class submarines Vela and Vagli.

Sindhukirti's refit was scheduled for 3 years, but the refit dragged on as problems arose. The ship became known as the dockyard queen. In 2009, Admiral Sureesh Mehta explained, "That kind of expertise did not exist in India before and this is for the first time that we are trying it out here. Instead of sending them to Russia all the way, this one is being offloaded to Hindustan Shipyards. There are some problems in their procurement procedures. It takes a little longer than is expected". While a Russian shipyard would deploy 200 workers in three shifts to complete the refit in two years, HSL deployed only 50 workers to work on Sindhukirti.

The refit included the addition of an MCA inertial navigation suite, a Palady nerve system a Pirit ship control console, BEL's indigenous USHUS sonar and a modernised CCS Mark II communications suite. Its torpedo tube was also modified to launch the Klub missile system.

After nine years in refit, Sindhukirti finally returned to sea on 23 May 2015.

The submarine underwent another "normal refit" at HSL between January 2025 and 3 August 2025. By May 2025, HSL completed two of its surface sorties and was scheduled for full-power sea trials by month-end. The refit was a result of ₹934 crore (equivalent to ₹10 billion or US$110 million in 2026) worth contract signed between the Ministry of Defence and Hindustan Shipyard.

== In popular culture ==
INS Sindhukirti was featured in series 'Breaking point Indian Submariners' which was released on Veer by Discovery YouTube channel.
