= USHUS (sonar) =

Indian submarine sonar system

USHUS is an Integrated Submarine Sonar System developed by the Naval Physical and Oceanographic Laboratory (NPOL) of the Defence Research and Development Organisation (DRDO) of India and manufactured by Bharat Electronics Limited (BEL). It has been developed for use in submarines of the Indian Navy, especially for Sindhughosh-class submarines. Some reports also suggest that Arihant-class nuclear ballistic missile submarines are also equipped with USHUS system. USHUS replaces Russian systems like MGK-400 and MGK-519 sonars on Indian submarines.

== Design and description ==
USHUS is a multipurpose integrated sonar suite used for detecting and tracking enemy submarines, surface vessels, and torpedoes as well as for underwater communication and obstacles avoidance operations. The sonar capabilities of includes active and passive sonar surveillance, underwater communication and is capable of interception and. The sub-systems of the sonar includes Active Sonar Array, Passive Sonar Array, Intercept Sonar Array (low to medium frequency), Obstacle Avoidance System and Underwater Telephony. The USHUS-2 variant has a detection range of 30 km.

The team developing the sonar was awarded the AGNI Award for self-reliance by the then Prime Minister of India Dr. Manmohan Singh in May 2007.

== Production ==
The production of the sonar is done by Bharat Electronics (BEL) at its Bengaluru unit, after transfer of technology from NPOL. NPOL continues to provide technical consultancy and support. The Indian Ministry of Defence signed a contract worth ₹167 crore with BEL for the delivery of the sonars for four Kilo-class submarines between 2003 and 2007. Initially one sonar system was installed and integrated in Russia and other system was installed on board an Indian submarine.

=== CAG report ===
A CAG audit report filed in December 2012 criticised the program for the delays, and mentioned that by then, only three submarines were upgraded with the sonar, and two of those had completed sea trials. The report also stated that due to delays in implementing the upgrade, a large portion of the sonar's technical life had expired. In 2005, two submarines were outfitted, of which one completed sea trial in January 2011. In 2008, the third submarine was upgraded and it completed the trial in December 2011.

== Current status ==
Indian Nuclear Submarine Project starting with INS Arihant (ATV-1) include the advanced USHUS sonar system.

By April 2013, five Sindhughosh class submarines of the navy were upgraded to include the USHUS system. They are, in order of their upgrade: INS Sindhuvir (S58), INS Sindhudhvaj (S56), INS Sindhuvijay (S62) and INS Sindhurakshak (S63). INS Sindhukirti (S61) was upgraded in India at Hindustan Shipyard. The remaining submarines of the class are expect to follow.

As of 2024, USHUS-1 has been installed on 5 of the Sindhughosh-class submarines whereas USHUS-2 variant of the sonar system is expected to be installed on INS Sindhughosh (S55), INS Sindhuraj (S57) and INS Sindhuratna (S59).

== See also ==
- Panchendriya (sonar)
