= List of Indian Naval accidents =

This is a list of accidents that have taken place in the Indian Navy. The list may be incomplete for years before 2000.

Article in India Today reported that since 1990, the Indian Navy has lost one warship in peacetime every five years. Since 2004, it has lost one naval combatant every two years. While peacetime losses of warships are not uncommon, the magazine mentioned that few global navies have such a dubious record. According to the Times of India, while some of accidents reported since August 2013 were serious, many of them were trivial incidents exaggerated in public.

These accidents have been attributed to ageing ships in need of maintenance (refit/repairs delayed in spite of laid down rules for refit cycles), delayed acquisitions by the Ministry of Defence, and human error. However naval commentators also argue that as India's large navy of 160 ships clocks around 12,000 ship-days at sea every year, in varied waters and weather, some incidents are inevitable. Captains of erring ships are dismissed from their command following an enquiry. The navy is envisaging a new 'Safety Organisation' to improve safety of its warships, nuclear submarines and aircraft in view of its planned increase in fleet strength over the next decade.

== 1990–2000 ==
- August 1990 : INS Andaman, an Arnala-class corvette sank during an anti-submarine warfare exercise on the return journey to Visakhapatnam from the Andaman Islands. A small leak in the aft steering led to flooding and engine shutdown (considered routine amid deferred maintenance). However it could not be repaired and flooded and sank amid choppy seas. 15 sailors died.

== 2000–2010 ==
- December 2005: INS Trishul, a Talwar-class frigate, collided with a commercial vessel, Ambuja Laxmi, outside Mumbai harbor while returning from a training mission. This class of ship uses stealth technology and a special hull design to ensure a reduced radar cross section. Radar systems installed by the port authorities and those on board Ambuja Laxmi were unable to detect INS Trishul and prevent the side on collision. No casualties were reported.
- April 2006: INS Prahar, a Veer-class corvette, sank after colliding with MV Rajiv Gandhi about 20 nautical miles (37 km; 23 mi) away from the Goa coast. No casualties were reported. The commanding officer of the ship, Lieutenant Commander Yogesh Tripathi was found guilty of negligence by an Indian Navy court-martial and removed from Command.
- September 2006: INS Dunagiri, a Nilgiri-class frigate, collided with a Shipping Corporation of India merchant vessel, MV Kiti, off the coast of Mumbai. There were no casualties, but the Dunagiri suffered damage and required extensive repairs.
- January 2008: INS Sindhughosh, a Kilo-class submarine, collided with a foreign merchant vessel MV Leeds Castle while trying to surface in waters north of Mumbai. The submarine was taking part in fleet-level war games, when the accident occurred. The Navy termed it a minor incident with no casualties reported.
- August 2009: A collision of the missile corvette INS Kuthar with destroyer INS Ranvir in the Bay of Bengal was traced to a rudder failure, compounded by a flawed maneuver.

== 2010–2020 ==
- In 2010, three crew members on destroyer INS Mumbai were killed when an AK-630 Close-in weapon system went off as safety drills were not followed.
- January 2011: INS Vindhyagiri, a Nilgiri-class frigate, capsized after a collision with the Cyprus-flagged merchant vessel MV Nordlake near Sunk Rock Lighthouse, following which a major fire broke out in the ship's engine and boiler room. Everyone on board was evacuated as soon as the fire broke out and hence there were no casualties. INS Vindhyagiri was later decommissioned.
- August 2013: Blasts ripped through the torpedo compartment of the submarine INS Sindhurakshak while it was berthed at the naval dockyard off the Mumbai coast. Fifteen sailors and three officers were killed. Other sources state that a small explosion occurred around midnight which then triggered the two larger explosions. The disaster was thought to be the Indian navy's worst since the sinking of a frigate by a Pakistani submarine during the Bangladesh Liberation War.
- December 2013: In the second incident in the same month, INS Talwar, the lead ship of the Talwar-class frigates of the Indian Navy, collided with a fishing trawler of the coast of Maharashtra injuring four of the 27 people on board the trawler and sinking it. The fishing trawler was operating without lights. The captain of the ship was subsequently stripped of command.
- December 2013: In the third incident in the same month, INS Tarkash, again a Talwar-class frigate, suffered damage to its hull when it hit the jetty while docking at the Mumbai naval base. The navy ordered a board of inquiry.
- January 2014: INS Betwa, a Brahmaputra-class guided missile frigate, ran aground and collided with an unidentified object while approaching the Mumbai naval base. The sonar system of the frigate was cracked, leading to faulty readings and an ingress of saltwater into sensitive equipment.
- February 2014: On 26 February, INS Sindhuratna, a Kilo-class submarine, had a fire detected on board when trials were being conducted which resulted in smoke leading to suffocation and death of two officers. Seven sailors were reported injured and were airlifted to the naval base hospital in Mumbai. According to the naval board of inquiry, the fire was caused due to problems in the cables of the vessel. This particular incident led to the resignation of Chief of Naval Staff (CNS) Admiral D K Joshi on 26 February, who owned moral responsibility for the incidents in the past few months.
- March 2014: While in Mumbai, INS Kolkata had a malfunction on board which led to a toxic gas leak killing Commander Kuntal Wadhwa. According to the Indian Navy, the ship suffered a malfunction in its carbon dioxide unit while undergoing machinery trials, leading to gas leakage. Since the ship was not commissioned at the time of the incident, the enquiry into the mishap will be done by Mazagon Dock Limited, where the ship was constructed.
- March 2014: One civilian worker was killed and two people were injured in an accident in Vishakapatnam where India was building its nuclear ballistic submarines. The incident took place when the pressure of the hydraulic tank of the Arihant class submarine was being tested and the tank's lid fell on the workers at Building-5 of the shipbuilding centre.
- May 2014: INS Ganga suffered a minor explosion in the boiler room while undergoing a refit at the Mumbai dockyard. Four people suffered minor injuries. There was no fire and no equipment was damaged.
- November 2014: Indian Navy's Astravahini-class torpedo recovery vessel TRV A 72 sank off Vishakapatnam during a routine exercise on 6 November; one sailor was killed during the rescue and four were missing, feared dead. The auxiliary ship sank to a depth of about 370 meters, about 35 nautical miles south of Visakhapatnam and 28 nautical miles from the closest point of the coast. At the time of incident there were 28 personnel on board of which 24 were rescued by naval ships. The main cause of the accident was indicated as cracks in the seals attached to the shaft, which allowed in seawater and resulted in flooding This was one of 24 accidents in the previous 3 years involving Indian naval ships and submarines reported in the Rajya Sabha by the Defence Minister in response to a query
- April 2016: A sailor lost his leg while two others were injured in an oxygen cylinder explosion on board INS Nireekshak. The explosion took place on 16 April while a diving bailout bottle, a small 12-inch (30 cm) oxygen bottle that is carried by divers in their diving helmet, was being charged. The sailors were admitted to the Military Hospital, Thiruvananthapuram as the ship was on it way to Mumbai from Visakhapatnam.
- June 2016: Two people, a sailor and a civilian contractor, were killed by a toxic gas leak that occurred during maintenance work in the Sewage Treatment Plant compartment during the first refit of the aircraft carrier INS Vikramaditya at Karwar, Karnataka. Two other people were injured and taken to the naval hospital.
- August 2016: A minor fire broke out at INS Dega after a MiG-29K accidentally jettisoned one of its drop tanks.
- October 2016: Sub Lieutenant Tejveer Singh died on 11 October 2016 onboard INS Kuthar after he accidentally fired his 9mm pistol. He was shifted to Naval Hospital INHS Kalyani in Visakhapatnam where he succumbed to his injuries.
- November 2016: The front portion of INS Nashak was damaged when its GT engines failed in Mumbai harbor and it collided with a jetty on 18 November.
- December 2016: Two sailors died and 14 others were injured when INS Betwa tipped over and crashed on its side while it was undocking in Mumbai on 6 December. The main mast of the ship broke when it tipped over due to a failure in the dock block mechanism. The ship was being undocked after undergoing a midlife refit.
- January 2017: A minor fire broke out at 11.40am on 10 January in the Gyro compartment of INS Pralay during welding work at Mumbai naval dockyard. The fire was extinguished by the ship's staff and the Naval Dockyard fire station and no one was injured during the incident.

== 2020–present ==
- October 2021: Four sailors were injured when a fire broke out on the INS Ranvijay while it was berthed in Vishakapathanam.
- January 2022: Three sailors died and eleven others were injured when an explosion took place aboard the INS Ranvir while it was docked in Mumbai.
- July 2024: A fire broke out on INS Brahmaputra, a Brahmaputra-class guided missile frigate, whilst it was undergoing a refit, after which the ship proceeded to list on its side. One junior sailor was missing following the incident. His body was later recovered.

== See also ==
- List of submarine incidents since 2000
- List of Russian military accidents
- List of Chinese military accidents
