= Sindhughosh-class submarine =

Class of diesel-electric submarines used by the Indian Navy

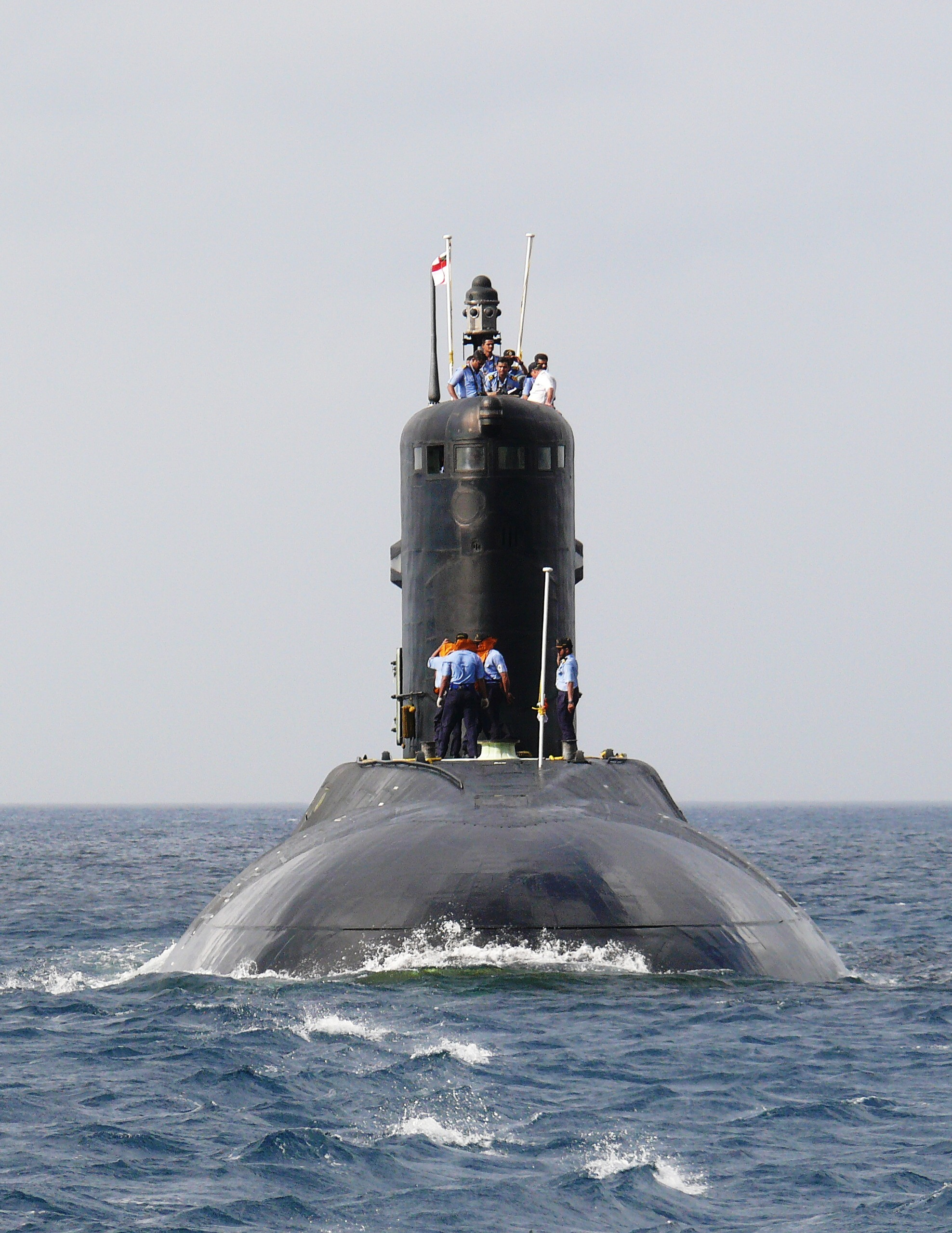
- INS Sindhuvijay (S62)

Class overview
- Name: Sindhughosh class
- Operators: Indian Navy; Myanmar Navy
- Preceded by: Vela class
- Succeeded by: Kalvari class
- In commission: 1986–present
- Planned: 10
- Completed: 10
- Active: 6
- Retired: 4

General characteristics
- Type: Attack Submarine
- Displacement: 2,325 t (2,288 long tons) surfaced; 3,076 t (3,027 long tons) submerged
- Length: 72.6 m (238 ft 2 in)
- Beam: 9.9 m (32 ft 6 in)
- Draught: 6.6 m (21 ft 8 in)
- Propulsion: 2 × diesel-electric motors, 3,650 hp (2,722 kW) each; 1 × motor, 5,900 hp (4,400 kW); 2 × auxiliary motors, 204 hp (152 kW); 1 × economic speed motor, 130 hp (97 kW)
- Speed: 11 knots (20 km/h; 13 mph) surfaced; 19 knots (35 km/h; 22 mph) submerged
- Range: 6,000 mi (9,700 km) at 7 kn (13 km/h; 8.1 mph) snorkeling; 400 mi (640 km) at 3 kn (5.6 km/h; 3.5 mph) submerged
- Test depth: 300 m (980 ft)
- Complement: 53 (13 Officers)
- Armament: Club-S missile; Type 53-65 torpedo; TEST 71/76 anti-submarine, active-passive homing torpedo; 24 × DM-1 mines in lieu of torpedoes

Sindhughosh-class (lit. 'Roar of the Sea') submarines are Kilo-class diesel-electric submarines in active service with the Indian Navy. Their names are in Sanskrit, but in their Roman-alphabet forms sometimes a final short -a is dropped.

The Sindhughosh submarines, designated 877EKM, were designed as part of Project 877, and built under a contract between Rosvooruzhenie and the Ministry of Defence (India).

The submarines have a displacement of 3,000 tonnes, a maximum diving depth of 300 meters, top speed of 18 knots, and are able to operate solo for 45 days with a crew of 53. The final unit was the first to be equipped with the 3M-54 Klub (SS-N-27) antiship cruise missiles with a range of 220 km.

As of 2024, three of the submarines (S55, S57, S59) based at INS Vajrabahu, Mumbai, form 12th Submarine Squadron while four of the submarines (S60, S61, S62, S65) based at INS Virbahu, Mumbai, form 11th Submarine Squadron.

== Life extension and refit ==
INS Sindhuvijay has been upgraded with the hydro acoustical USHUS complex and the CCS-MK radio communications system. On 29 August 2014, the Defence Acquisition Council (DAC) cleared the long-awaited mid-life upgrade of the four Kilo-class submarines, which would be carried out in Indian shipyards and is likely to cost ₹4,800 crore (equivalent to ₹77 billion or US$810 million in 2023). On 5 November 2014 official sources at HSL said more than 90% of the work has been completed on the seventh submarine of the Sindhughosh class INS Sindhukirti. Scheduled to re-join the fleet on 31 March 2015, she re-entered service on 23 May.

The Indian Navy signed a contract with the Russian shipbuilder Sevmash to refit and upgrade the existing submarines and to extend their operational life by 35 years. The first submarine, INS Sindhukesari, will be sent for refit starting June 2016. The extensive refit, the value for which is pegged at ₹5,000 crore (equivalent to ₹72 billion or US$760 million in 2023) for a total of four submarines, will not only extend the life of the boats but will also upgrade their combat potential and fitted with Klub land attack cruise missile.

In December 2015, L&T was chosen by the Russian shipbuilder Sevmash to be its Indian partner in the refit project. While the first of the four Kilo class subs will go to the Russian Zvezdochka shipyard for inspection and refit, the remaining three are likely to be modernized at the Kattupalli shipyard. The first of the submarines to be modernized at private yard, a first for India, will go in by 2017. An order for 2-3 more submarines could also be commissioned, depending on ongoing acquisition plans of the Indian Navy.

As reported on 3 September 2025, INS Sindhuvijay is expected to undergo a refit at the Hindustan Shipyard. While the Navy has acquired the Acceptance of Necessity (AoN) from the Defence Acquisition Council of the Ministry of Defence, the contract finalisation is expected to be completed within two or three weeks. Given that all the procedures are completed on schedule, the submarine is expected to begin its refit by the end of the year. The refits will include hull repair, equipment overhauling, upgrading sensors and weaponry, extending the submarine's life as well as enhancing combat readiness of the vessel.

== Service history ==
In 2015, the naval exercise Malabar, between the navies of India and the United States, involved Sindhudhvaj and USS City of Corpus Christi hunting each other. India Today reported that Sindhudhvaj managed to track Corpus Christi and score a simulated kill without being detected.

It was reported in April 2023 that India would be purchasing over 20 Klub anti-ship cruise missiles worth $120 million. On 4 February 2025, it was reported that the deal has been concluded for cruise missiles for Sindhughosh-class submarines in the presence of the Defence Secretary Rajesh Kumar Singh.

One of the submarine was deployed alongside INS Vikrant along with 7 frontline warships and 5 submarines (Shishumar class and Kalvari class) on 7 November 2024. The operations included carrier operations of MiG-29K, missile firing drills, submarine manoeuvres and flypasts by 30 aircraft demonstrated to the President of India Droupadi Murmu who was present on board INS Vikrant.

The lead ship of the class, Sindhughosh, was decommissioned after 40 years of service in Mumbai in the presence of the Western Naval Command chief, Vice Admiral Krishna Swaminathan. The submarine was paid off under the command of Lieutenant Commander Rajat Sharma.

== Incidents ==
- On 10 January 2008, INS Sindhughosh collided with the cargo ship MV Leeds Castle. The submarine was reported to have sustained superficial damage to its conning tower. As a result, the submarine was out of service for a month. The cargo ship was in restricted shallow waters.
- On 26 February 2010, a fire on board INS Sindhurakshak killed one sailor and injured two others. The fire was due to a defective battery.
- On 14 August 2013 an explosion, followed by a fire, was reported to have occurred on Sindhurakshak. Sindhurakshak sank in the dock.
- On 17 January 2014, Sindhughosh ran aground due to the low tide, while returning to the Naval Dockyard, Mumbai.
- On 26 February 2014, smoke was detected on board INS Sindhuratna resulting in 7 sailors being rendered unconscious and two dead. Those unconscious were airlifted to hospital.

== Ships of the class ==
Name	Pennant	Builder	Commission date	Decommission date	Status
Sindhughosh	S55	Sevmash, Severodvinsk	30 April 1986	19 December 2025	Decommissioned
Sindhudhvaj	S56	Sevmash, Severodvinsk	12 June 1987	16 July 2022	Decommissioned; being scrapped
Sindhuraj	S57	Sevmash, Severodvinsk	20 October 1987		Refitted under project 08773 at Zvezdochka shipyard.
Sindhuvir	S58	Sevmash, Severodvinsk	26 August 1988	March 2020	Refit at Hindustan Shipyard completed. Transferred to Myanmar Navy in March 2020.
Sindhuratna	S59	Sevmash, Severodvinsk	22 December 1988		Refitted to project 08773 2001-2003 at Zvezdochka shipyard
Sindhukesari	S60	Sevmash, Severodvinsk	16 February 1989		Refitted under project 08773 at Zvezdochka shipyard.
Sindhukirti	S61	Sevmash, Severodvinsk	4 January 1990		Refitted to project 08773 from 2007-2015 in at Hindustan Shipyard Visakhapatnam.
Sindhuvijay	S62	Sevmash, Severodvinsk	18 March 1991		Refitted to project 08773 2005-2007 at Zvezdochka shipyard
Sindhurakshak	S63	Sevmash, Severodvinsk	24 December 1997	5 September 2017	Refitted to project 08773 09/08/2010-2012 at Zvezdochka shipyard. Exploded and sank in Mumbai 14 August 2013
Sindhushastra	S65	Sevmash, Severodvinsk	19 July 2000		To be Refitted to project 08773

== Gallery ==
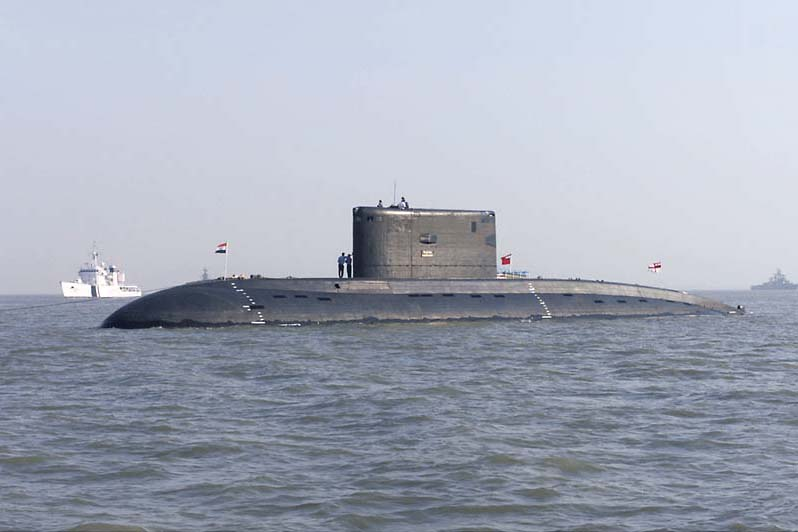
INS Sindhurakshak

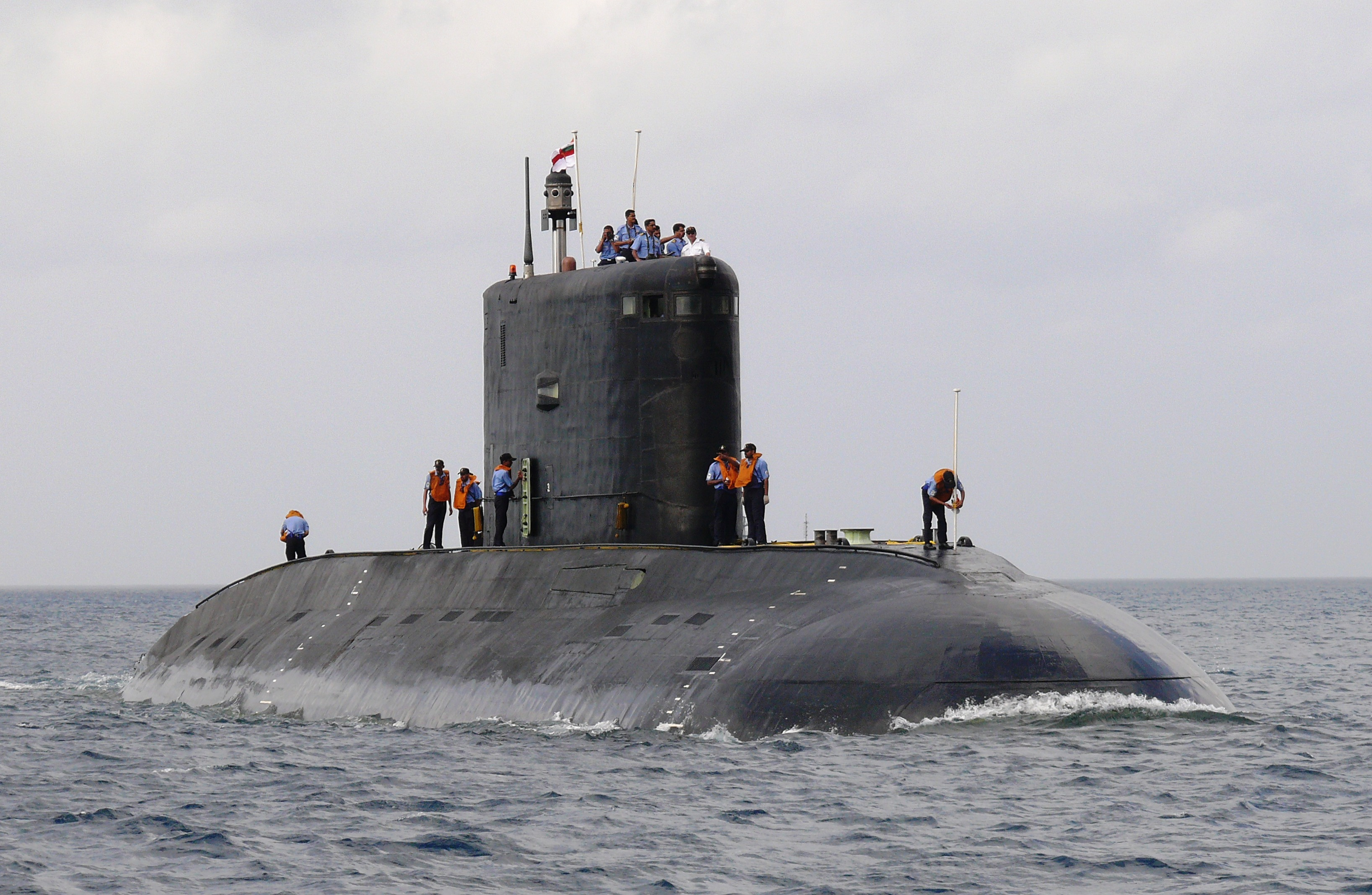
INS Sindhuvijay

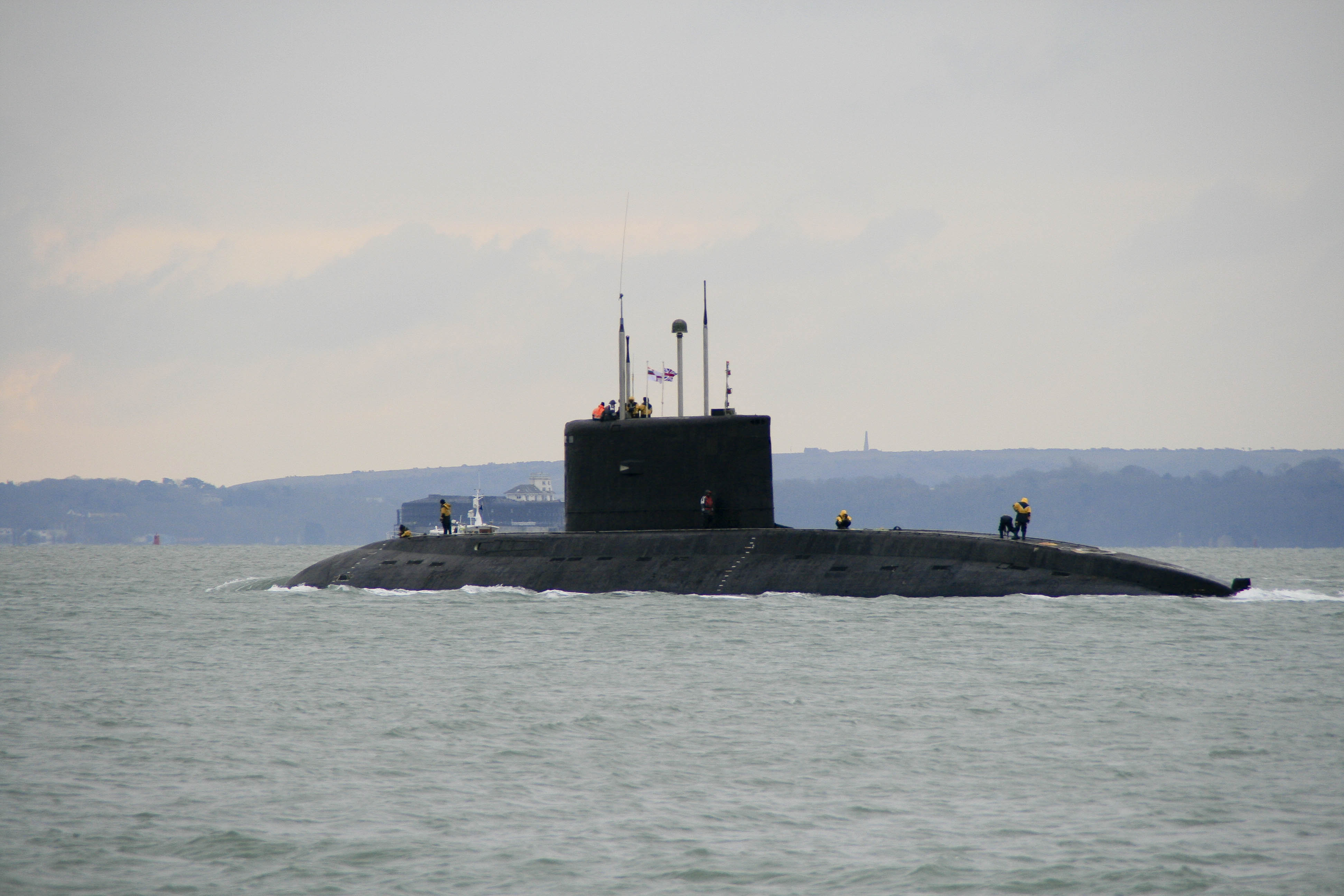
INS Sindhurakshak at Portsmouth Harbour, UK in 2013

design of submarines

== See also ==
- List of active Indian Navy ships

Equivalent submarines of the same era

- Harushio class
- Upholder/Victoria class
- Walrus class
- Santa Cruz class
- Hai Lung class
