= S59 =

S59 may refer to:

- S59 (Long Island bus)
- S59 (New York City bus), serving Staten Island
- Dharawal language
- HMAS Otway (S 59), a submarine of the Royal Australian Navy
- INS Sindhuratna (S59), a submarine of the Indian Navy
- S59: Refer to manufacturer/supplier for information on recovery/recycling, a safety phrase
- Savoia-Marchetti S.59, an Italian flying boat
- SIA Engineering Company, a Singaporean aerospace company
- Sikorsky S-59, a prototype American helicopter
