= USS City of Corpus Christi =

Los Angeles-class nuclear-powered attack submarine of the US Navy

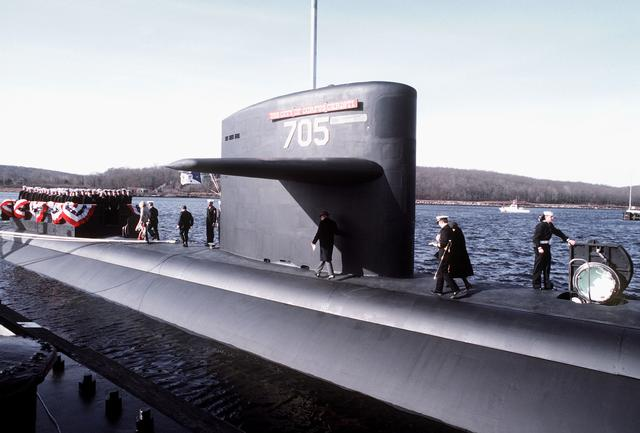
- USS City of Corpus Christi

History

United States
- Name: USS City of Corpus Christi
- Namesake: Corpus Christi, Texas
- Ordered: 31 October 1973
- Builder: General Dynamics Electric Boat
- Laid down: 4 September 1979
- Launched: 25 April 1981
- Commissioned: 8 January 1983
- Decommissioned: 3 August 2017
- Stricken: 3 August 2017
- Motto: For God and Country
- Fate: Disposed of by submarine recycling
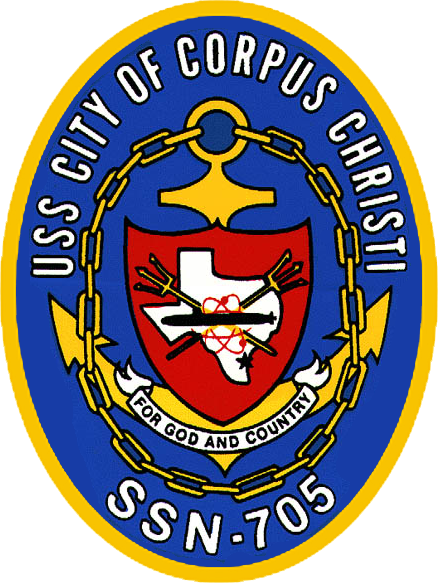
- Badge

General characteristics
- Class & type: Los Angeles-class submarine
- Displacement: 5770 tons light, 6144 tons full, 374 tons dead loaded
- Length: 110.3 m (361 ft 11 in)
- Beam: 10 m (32 ft 10 in)
- Draft: 9.7 m (31 ft 10 in)
- Propulsion: One S6G reactor
- Speed: 25 knots (46 km/h)
- Complement: 12 officers, 98 enlisted

USS City of Corpus Christi (SSN-705), a Los Angeles-class submarine, was the second ship of the United States Navy to be named for Corpus Christi, Texas. The Navy originally planned to use the name "USS Corpus Christi."

== Etymology ==
The "City of" prefix was added before its 1983 commissioning to clarify that the ship is meant to honor the city, in response to Catholic politicians, including then-Speaker of the House Tip O'Neill, who protested against naming a warship using Latin words which translate to "Body of Christ."

== History ==
The contract to build her was awarded to the Electric Boat Division of General Dynamics Corporation in Groton, Connecticut on 31 October 1973 and her keel was laid down on 4 September 1979. She was launched on 25 April 1981 sponsored by Mrs. John Tower, and commissioned on 8 January 1983. The ship's patch was chosen by the crew based on entries to an art contest sponsored by the Corpus Christi, Texas city government.

During the naval Exercise Malabar, between the navies of India, the United States and Japan, in a simulated battle, the Indian Navy's INS Sindhudhvaj reportedly scored a kill against City of Corpus Christi. Sindhudhvaj is a Soviet-built Kilo class, but upgraded with the Indian USHUS sonar.

The ship was berthed at Puget Sound Naval Shipyard in Bremerton, Washington, having moved there after being deactivated on 30 May 2016, eventually scrapped as of 15 November 2024.
