= INS Sindhukesari =

Kilo class submarine of the Indian navy

History

India
- Name: INS Sindhukesari
- Launched: 16 August 1988
- Commissioned: 19 December 1988
- Status: in active service

General characteristics
- Class & type: Sindhughosh-class submarine
- Displacement: 2325 tons surfaced; 3076 tons dived
- Length: 72.6 m (238 ft)
- Beam: 9.9 m (32 ft)
- Draught: 6.6 m (22 ft)
- Propulsion: 2 × 3,650 hp (2,720 kW) diesel-electric motors; 1 × 5,900 hp (4,400 kW) motor; 2 × 204 hp (152 kW) auxiliary motors; 1 × 130 hp (97 kW) economic speed motor
- Speed: Surfaced; 11 knots (20 km/h); Snorkel Mode; 9 knots (17 km/h); Submerged; 19 knots (35 km/h)
- Range: Snorting: 6,000 mi (9,700 km) at 7 kn (13 km/h); Submerged: 400 miles (640 km) at 3 knots (5.6 km/h)
- Endurance: Up to 45 days with a crew of 52
- Test depth: Operational Depth; 240 m (790 ft); Maximum Depth; 300 m (980 ft)
- Complement: 52 (incl. 13 Officers)
- Armament: 9M36 Strela-3 (SA-N-8) SAM launcher; Klub-S (3M-54E) ASCM; Type 53-65 passive wake homing torpedo; TEST 71/76 anti-submarine, active-passive homing torpedo; 24 DM-1 mines in lieu of torpedo tube

INS Sindhukesari (S60) (lit. 'Lion of the Sea') is a Sindhughosh-class diesel-electric submarine of the Indian Navy.

== Mid life upgrades and career ==
INS Sindhukesari, inducted in 1989, underwent a mid-life upgrade in 2018 at the Zvezdochka Shipyard in Severodvinsk in Russia, according to The Indian Navy reports. The upgrade included a refit and modernization, aiming to extend the submarine's service life. This upgrade is part of a broader program to modernize the Indian Navy's Kilo-class submarines. She participated in the International Fleet Review 2026 held at Visakapatnam. The submarine was on a port call at the Port of Colombo, Sri Lanka for an operational turnaround on 3 May 2026.
