= INS Sindhudhvaj =

History
- Name: INS Sindhudhvaj
- Commissioned: 12 June 1987
- Decommissioned: 16 July 2022
- Fate: Scrapped

General characteristics
- Class & type: Sindhughosh-class submarine
- Displacement: 2325 tons surfaced; 3076 tons submerged
- Length: 72.6 m (238 ft)
- Beam: 9.9 m (32 ft)
- Draught: 6.6 m (22 ft)
- Propulsion: 2 × 3,650 hp (2,720 kW) diesel-electric motors; 1 × 5,900 hp (4,400 kW) motor; 2 × 204 hp (152 kW) auxiliary motors; 1 × 130 hp (97 kW) economic speed motor
- Speed: Surfaced;11 knots (20 km/h); Snorkel Mode; 9 knots (17 km/h); Submerged;19 knots (35 km/h)
- Range: Snorting: 6,000 mi (9,700 km) at 7 kn (13 km/h); Submerged: 400 miles (640 km) at 3 knots (5.6 km/h)
- Endurance: Up to 45 days with a crew of 52
- Test depth: Operational depth; 240 m (790 ft); Maximum depth; 300 m (980 ft)
- Complement: 52 (incl. 13 Officers)
- Sensors & processing systems: USHUS sonar
- Armament: 9M36 Strela-3 (SA-N-8) SAM launcher; Klub-S (3M-54E) ASCM; Type 53-65 passive wake homing torpedo; TEST 71/76 anti-submarine, active-passive homing torpedo; 24 DM-1 mines in lieu of torpedo tube

INS Sindhudhvaj (S56) was a Sindhughosh-class submarine of the Indian Navy in service from 1987 until 16 July 2022, when she was decommissioned.

The name Sindhudhvaj means "flag bearer at sea". The submarine's crest depicts a grey nurse shark. Sindhudhvaj was the submarine to operationalise several indigenously built systems including the USHUS sonar, the Rukmani and MSS satellite communication systems, the inertial navigation system and the torpedo fire control system.

The submarine also completed a successful mating and personnel transfer with a deep-submergence rescue vehicle. It was the only submarine to be awarded the Chief of the Naval Staff's Rolling Trophy for Innovation by Prime Minister Narendra Modi.

As of July 2024, the submarine, weighing 2000 tonnes, is under the process of being dismantled at Steel Industrials Kerala Limited (SILK) at Azhikkal in Kannur by 40 workers. The process will take 6 months to complete.
