= INS Sindhurakshak =

Indian naval vessel

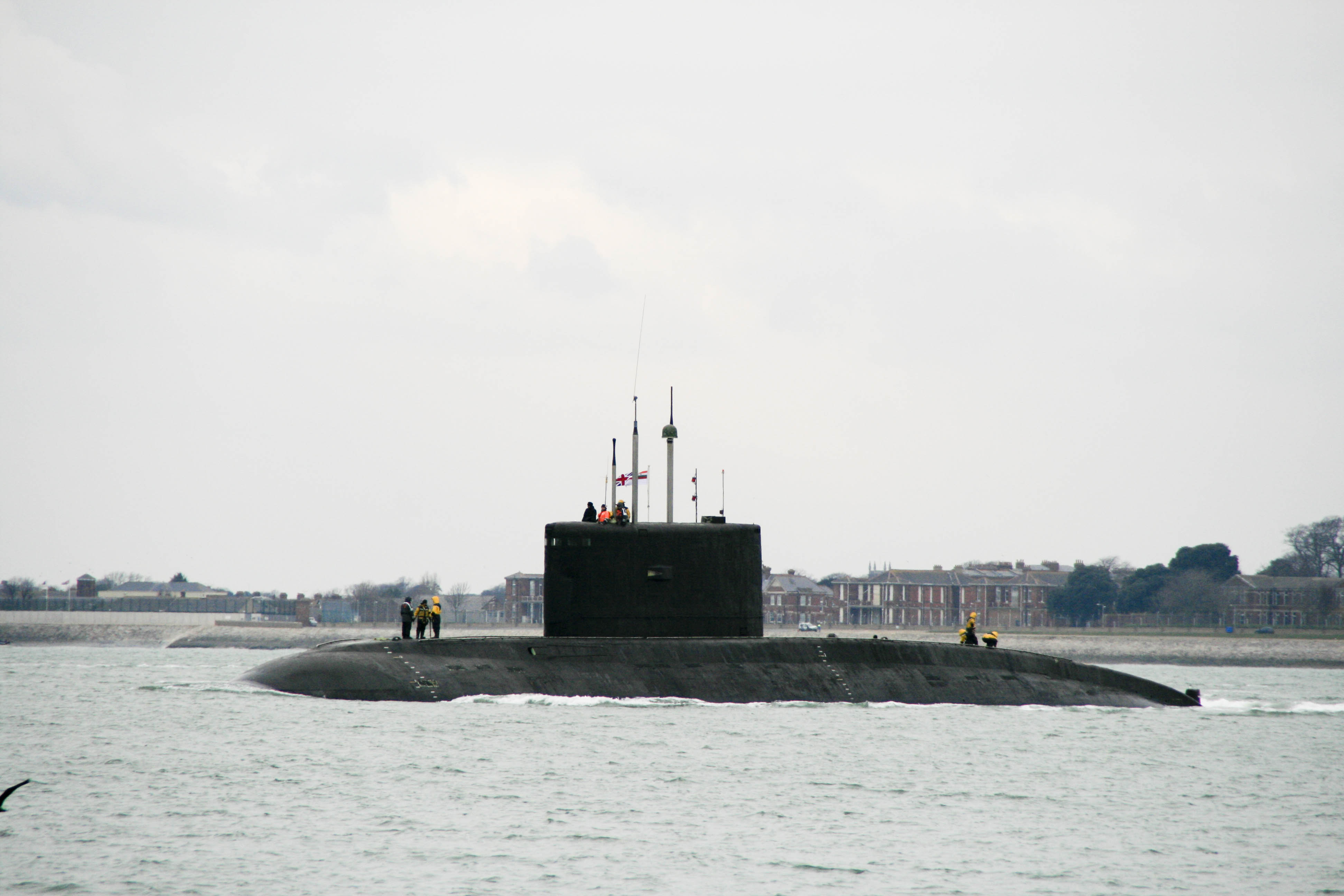
- INS Sindhurakshak in 2013.

History

India
- Name: INS Sindhurakshak
- Builder: Admiralty Shipyard, Saint Petersburg
- Laid down: 16 February 1995
- Launched: 26 June 1997
- Commissioned: 24 December 1997
- Decommissioned: 6 March 2017
- Out of service: 14 August 2013
- Identification: Pennant number: S63
- Fate: Severely damaged on 14 August 2013 due to on-board explosions; sunk in deep water in Arabian Sea in June 2017

General characteristics
- Class & type: Sindhughosh-class submarine
- Displacement: 2,325 t (2,563 short tons) surfaced; 3,076 t (3,391 short tons) submerged
- Length: 72.6 m (238 ft)
- Beam: 9.9 m (32 ft)
- Draught: 6.6 m (22 ft)
- Propulsion: 2 × 3,650 hp (2,720 kW) diesel-electric motors; 1 × 5,900 hp (4,400 kW) motor; 2 × 204 hp (152 kW) auxiliary motors; 1 × 130 hp (97 kW) economic speed motor
- Speed: Surfaced: 10 knots (19 km/h); Snorkel Mode: 9 knots (17 km/h); Submerged: 17 knots (31 km/h)
- Range: Snorkel Mode: 6,000 mi (9,700 km) at 7 kn (13 km/h); Submerged: 400 miles (640 km) at 3 knots (5.6 km/h)
- Endurance: Up to 45 days with a crew of 52
- Test depth: Operational depth: 240 m (790 ft); Maximum depth: 300 m (980 ft)
- Complement: Seven officers and 61 ratings
- Armament: 9M36 Strela-3 (SA-N-8) surface-to-air missile; 3M-54 Klub-S anti-ship and land-attack missiles; Type 53-65 passive wake-homing torpedo; TEST 71/76 anti-submarine active-passive homing torpedo; 24 × DM-1 mines in lieu of torpedo tube

INS Sindhurakshak (Sanskrit, for Protector of the Seas) was a Russian-made Kilo-class 877EKM (Sindhughosh-class) diesel-electric submarine of the Indian Navy. Commissioned on 24 December 1997, it was the ninth of the ten Kilo-class submarines in the Indian Navy. On 4 June 2010, the Indian Defence Ministry and Zvezdochka shipyard signed a contract worth US$80 million to upgrade and overhaul the submarine. After the overhaul, it returned to India from Russia between May and June 2013.

The submarine suffered a major fire and explosion on 14 August 2013 and sank at Mumbai's naval dockyard with the death of 18 crew members.

== Construction ==
Sindhurakshak was constructed at the Admiralty Shipyard in Saint Petersburg, Russia. Construction of the submarine began in 1995. It was launched in June 1997 and delivered to India in December 1997.

== Service history ==
=== Kargil war (1999) ===
Sindhurakshak was deployed very close to Karachi, Pakistan during the Kargil War in 1999.

=== President Kalam (2006) ===
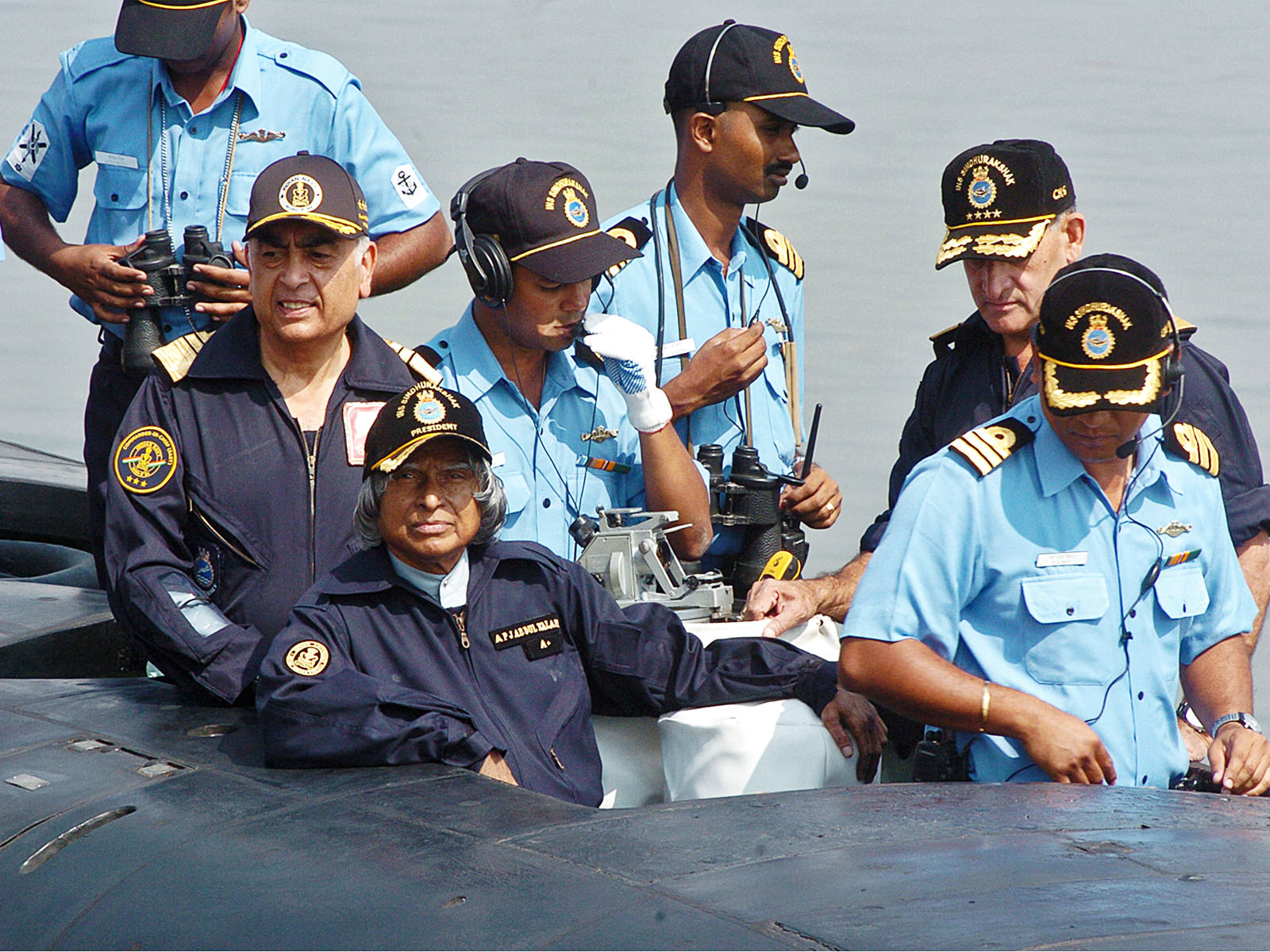
President APJ Abdul Kalam on-board Sindhurakshak

On 13 February 2006, during the submarine's deployment in Vishakhapatnam under the Eastern Naval Command, the then President of India A. P. J. Abdul Kalam became the first Indian head of state to sail in a submarine. He was given a demonstrative excursion, during which the submarine dived and sailed in the Bay of Bengal for a few hours. He was accompanied by the Chief of Naval Staff Arun Prakash. The submarine was commanded by Commander P S Bisht.

=== Accident (2010) ===
A fire broke out aboard Sindhurakshak while the vessel was in Visakhapatnam in February 2010. One sailor was killed and two others were injured. Navy officials reported that the fire had been caused by an explosion in the submarine's battery compartment, which occurred due to a faulty battery valve that leaked hydrogen gas.

=== Upgrades ===
After the fire damage in 2010, Sindhurakshak was transported to Russia on board a heavy lift ship from Visakhapatnam in June 2010 for refit, overhaul and upgrade which lasted two and a half years. In August 2010, Sindhurakshak arrived at the Zvezdochka shipyard in Russia. The submarine was modernised, repaired and retrofitted under Project 08773, and after the upgrade, the sea trials started in October 2012. The upgrades included improved electronic warfare systems, an integrated weapon control system and a new cooling system, and were expected to extend the service life of the submarine by ten years. The Club-S (3M54E1 anti-ship and 3M14E land attack) missiles, USHUS sonar, СCS-MK-2 radio communication systems and Porpoise radio-locating radar, and other safety-enhancing features were incorporated. The submarine was handed back to the Indian Navy on 27 January 2013, after which it sailed back to India, under Commander Rajesh Ramkumar. This was the first time an Indian submarine had navigated under ice.

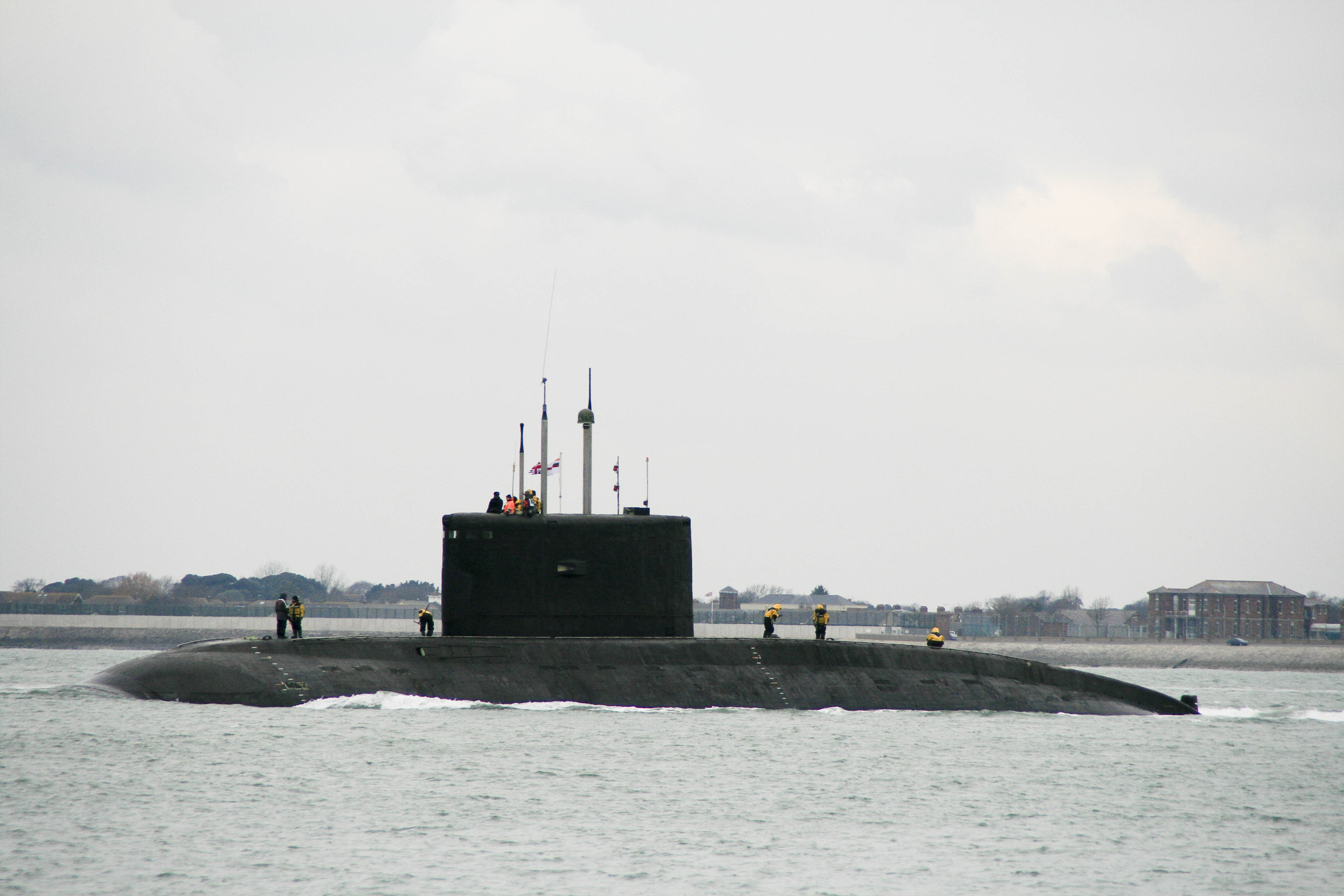
Sindhurakshak at Portsmouth, UK, where it was berthed on its way to India after the mid-life overhaul

=== Incident in the Mediterranean ===
In March 2013, while returning from the refit, Sindhurakshak encountered severe storms in the Mediterranean Sea when it was travelling near Alexandria. This was part of the submarine's extensive three-month-long deployment, where it traveled 10,000 miles. The severity of the storms prevented the Alexandria port authorities from sending a tugboat, and the shallow waters prevented the submarine from diving. An emergency call was placed via the Indian Ministry of External Affairs to the Egyptian Navy, which sent its latest tugboats and towed the submarine to Port Said.

=== Explosion and sinking (2013) ===
On 14 August 2013, the Sindhurakshak sank after explosions caused by a fire on board when the submarine was berthed at Mumbai. The fire, followed by a series of ordnance blasts on the armed submarine, occurred shortly after midnight. Though the fire was put out within two hours, due to damage from the explosions, the submarine sank and was partially submerged in 15 metres deep water at its berth, with only a portion of the sail visible above the water surface. Three sailors on board reportedly jumped off to safety. Navy divers were also brought in as there was a possibility that 18 personnel were trapped inside and Defence Minister A. K. Antony confirmed that there were fatalities. Other sources stated that a small explosion occurred around midnight which then triggered the two larger explosions.

Due to the explosion, the front section of the submarine was twisted, bent and crumpled, and water had entered the forward compartment. Another submarine, INS Sindhughosh was berthed very close to Sindhurakshak in the congested Mumbai naval dockyard; and sustained minor fire damage, though the navy did not release details of the extent of damage. Sindhurakshak's double hull was credited with preventing further damage to surrounding vessels. Official sources at the time said it was "highly unlikely" the submarine could be returned to service. The navy planned to begin salvage operations after the rescue operation was completed. By 19 August, seven bodies had been recovered, with 11 still missing. On 31 August, six of the eleven recovered bodies had been identified and sent home for last rites with military honours.

The Navy's preliminary report indicated that "an accident or inadvertent mishandling of ammunition" was the cause of the explosions; the full incident report would only be completed after the submarine was raised. The salvage contract was awarded on 31 January 2014 to Resolve India, a subsidiary of the US-based Resolve Marine Group. The submarine was brought to the surface on 6 June 2014. In December 2014, a naval court of inquiry arrived at the preliminary conclusion that human error as a result of crew fatigue caused the disaster. A senior officer stated that "the crew was working beyond their prescribed hours. Fatigue and exhaustion may have triggered human error that led to the accident. Standard operating procedures were violated at several levels". A 2017 report by the Comptroller and Auditor General of India quoted the Navy's Board of Inquiry stating that "Submarine authorities concerned didn’t properly assess the crew fatigue, besides, the submarine was holding ammunition nearing life expiry".

Initially, the navy was hopeful of using Sindhurakshak after it was salvaged, but on Navy Day 2015, Vice Admiral Cheema confirmed the Sindhurakshak would be disposed of. After a period of use for the training of marine commandos, the submarine was sunk in 3000 metres of water in the Arabian Sea in June 2017.

== See also ==
- List of submarine incidents since 2000
