= UMS Minye Theinkhathu =

Diesel-electric submarine of the Myanmar Navy

History

India
- Name: INS Sindhuvir (S58)
- Builder: Rubin Design Bureau and refitted by Hindustan Shipyard
- Launched: 13 September 1987
- Commissioned: 26 August 1988
- Decommissioned: 2020
- Fate: Transferred to Myanmar, 2020

Myanmar
- Name: UMS Minye Theinkhathu
- Namesake: Mingyi Swe
- Acquired: 2020
- Commissioned: 24 December 2020
- Status: in active service

Service record
- Part of: Indian Navy (1988–2020); Myanmar Navy (2020–present)

General characteristics
- Class & type: Sindhughosh-class submarine (Kilo Project-877EKM variant)
- Displacement: 2325 tons surfaced; 3076 tons dived
- Length: 72.6 m (238 ft)
- Beam: 9.9 m (32 ft)
- Draught: 6.6 m (22 ft)
- Propulsion: 2 × 3,650 hp (2,720 kW) diesel-electric motors; 1 × 5,900 hp (4,400 kW) motor; 2 × 204 hp (152 kW) auxiliary motors; 1 × 130 hp (97 kW) economic speed motor
- Speed: Surfaced: 11 knots (20 km/h); Snorkel Mode: 9 knots (17 km/h); Submerged: 19 knots (35 km/h)
- Range: Snorting: 6,000 nmi (11,000 km) at 7 kn (13 km/h); Submerged: 400 nautical miles (740 km) at 3 knots (5.6 km/h); Full run: 12.7 nmi (23.5 km) at 21 knots (39 km/h)
- Endurance: Up to 45 days with a crew of 52
- Test depth: Operational Depth; 240 m (790 ft); Maximum Depth: 300 m (980 ft)
- Complement: 52 (incl. 13 Officers)
- Sensors & processing systems: Surface Search: MRK-50E (Snoop Tray-2) general purpose detection radar with Target Separating System (TSS); Sonar; MGK-400E Rubikon-E (Shark Teeth) active/passive sonar; Control Systems; MVU-110EM automatic digital combat management system; AICS Lama EKM Integrated Combat Control Console System; PIRIT Control System; Navigation Systems and Communication System; Andoga Navigation System; GPS Navigation System; Nereides VLF/LF Communication System
- Electronic warfare & decoys: MRP-25E ECM suite; MRP-25ZM ESM system; Radar warning receiver; 6701E Quad Loop Direction Finder (DF)
- Armament: 18 torpedoes (6 in tubes and 12 on the racks) for; Type 53-65 passive wake homing torpedoes; TEST-71MKE TV guided electric homing torpedoes; Up to 24 DM-1 mines in the lieu of torpedo tubes; 9M36 Strela-3 (SA-N-8) MANPAD

UMS Minye Theinkhathu (71) (Burmese: မင်းရဲသိင်္ခသူ; Burmese pronunciation: [mɪ́ɴjɛ́ θèiɴgəðù]) is a Sindhughosh (Kilo)-class submarine owned by the Myanmar Navy. It is the first of two submarines procured by the country's navy, followed by the UMS Minye Kyaw Htin. Before being acquired by Myanmar, it served in the Indian Navy as INS Sindhuvir (S58) (Brave at the Sea).

== Background ==
Beginning in the 1980s and ending in 2000, the Indian Navy acquired ten Kilo-class submarines from the Soviet Union and its successor state Russia. Within India, they are known as the Sindhughosh class.

== Myanmar Navy service ==
Myanmar acquired Sindhuvir in 2020. The ship was refitted by Hindustan Shipyard before the handover.

The submarine was first seen publicly as a Myanmar Navy ship, as UMS Minye Theinkhathu, on 15 October 2020 as part of a naval fleet exercise (‘Bandoola 2020’). The submarine was formally commissioned along with other six new ships at the 73rd Navy Day ceremony on 24 December 2020. The ceremony was attended by the Indian and Russian ambassadors to Myanmar, which the military intelligence company Jane's believes could indicate Russian involvement in the submarine's transfer to Myanmar.

It appears to be named after Minye Theinkhathu of Toungoo (Taungoo), who was the father of King Bayinnaung and served as viceroy of Toungoo from 1540 to 1549.

The Minye Theinkhathu was in naval exercises alongside the Minye Kyaw Htin on July 6, 2022 in the Bay of Bengal.

== Gallery ==
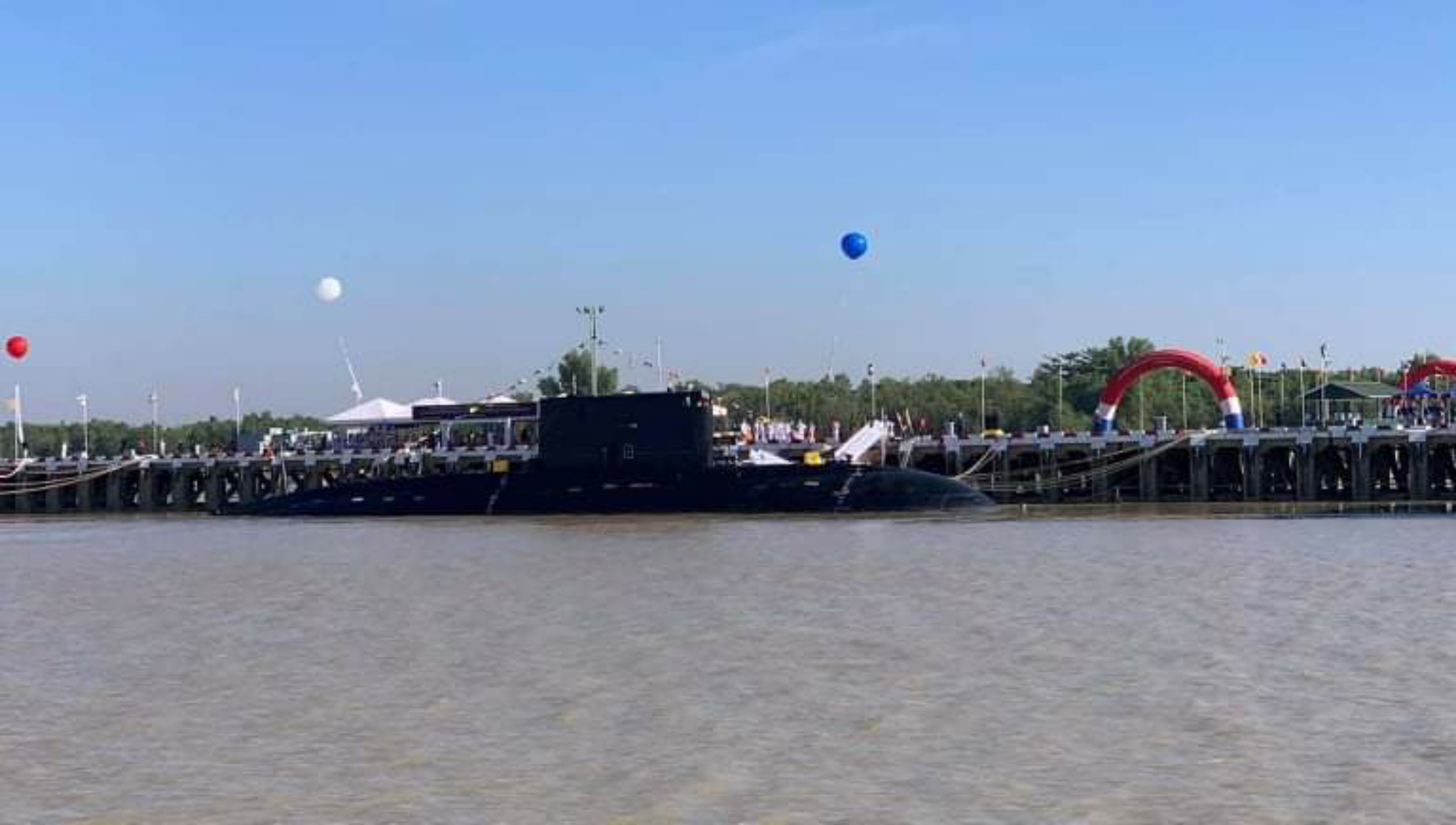
UMS Minye Theinkhathu at the commissioning ceremony
