= Compressed fluid =

Fluid under thermodynamic or mechanical conditions which force it to be a liquid

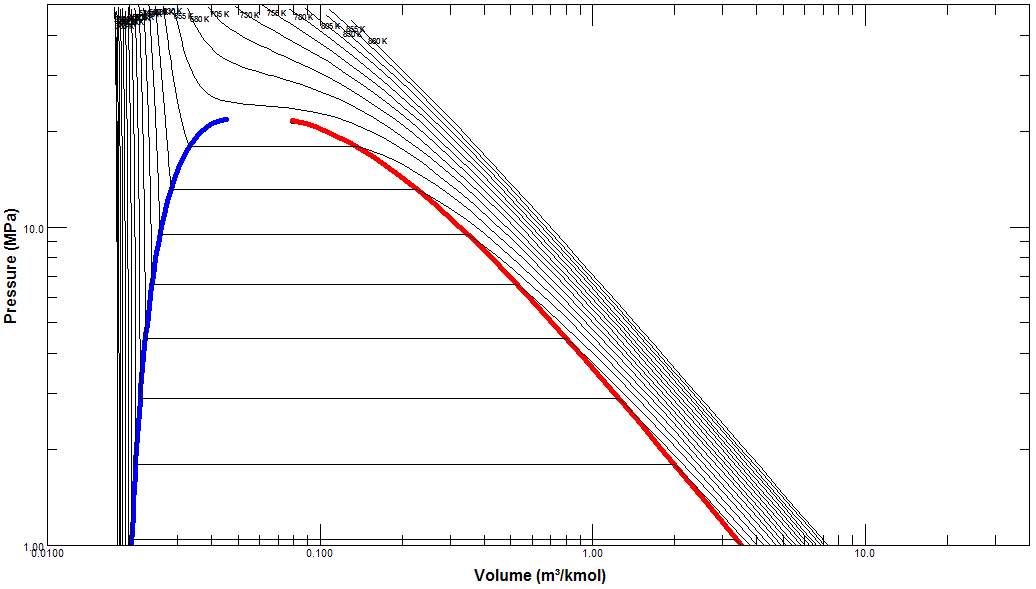
A p-v diagram for liquid water. The compressed fluid region is located to the left of the blue line (the liquid-vapor phase boundary).

The international pictogram for compressed gases.

A compressed fluid (also called a compressed or unsaturated liquid, subcooled fluid or liquid) is a fluid under mechanical or thermodynamic conditions that force it to be a liquid.

At a given pressure, a fluid is a compressed fluid if it is at a temperature lower than the saturation temperature. This is the case, for example, for liquid water at atmospheric pressure and room temperature. In a plot that compares pressure and specific volume (commonly called a p-v diagram), compressed fluid is the state to the left of the saturation curve.

Conditions that cause a fluid to be compressed include:

- Specific volume and enthalpy inferior to that of a saturated liquid;
- Temperature below the saturation temperature;
- Pressure above the saturation pressure.

The term compressed liquid emphasizes that the pressure is greater than the saturation pressure for the given temperature. Compressed liquid properties are relatively independent of pressure.
