= INS Sindhuvijay =

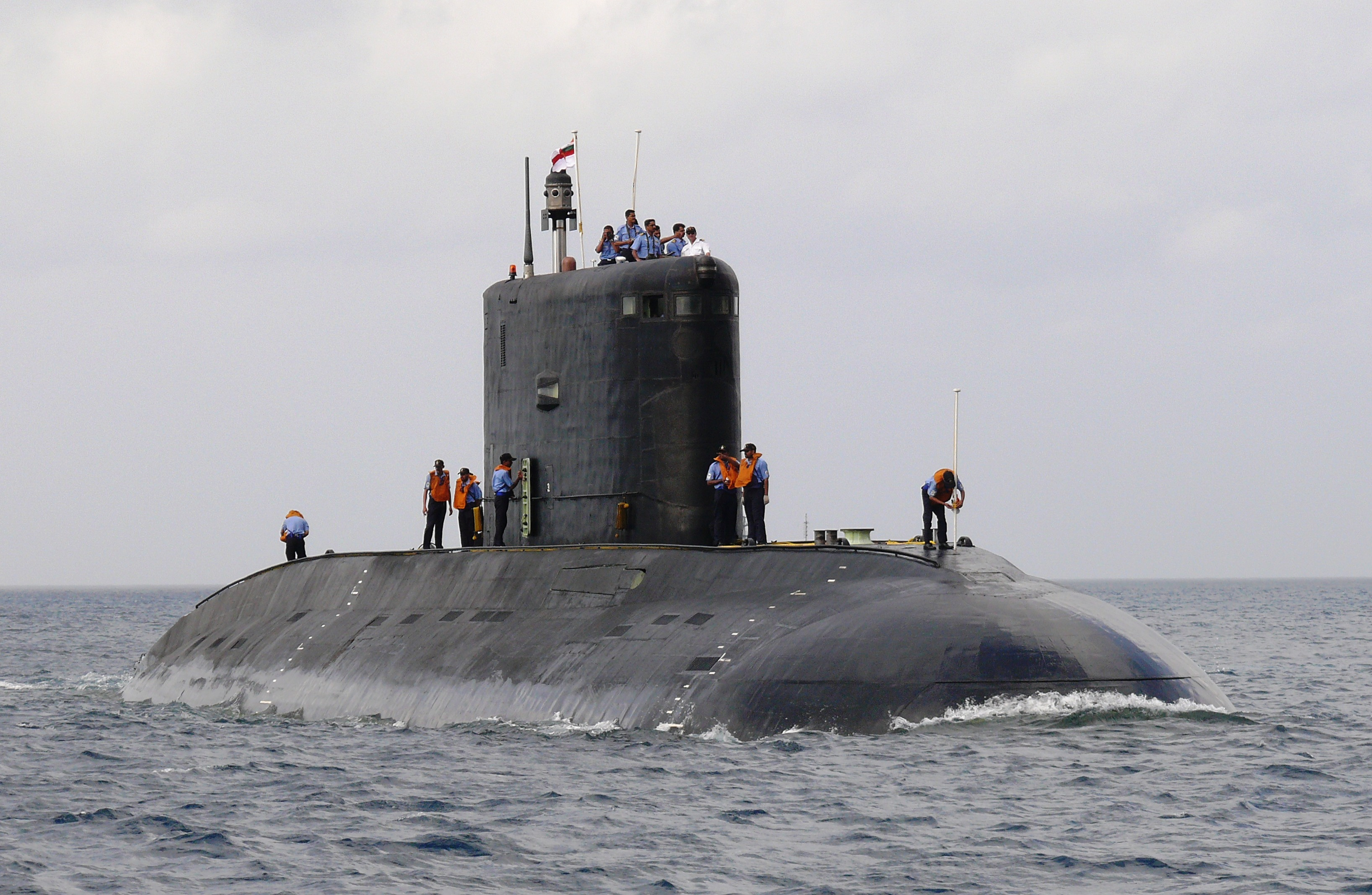

History

India
- Name: INS Sindhuvijay
- Launched: 27 July 1990
- Commissioned: 8 March 1991
- Status: Active

General characteristics
- Class & type: Sindhughosh-class submarine
- Displacement: 2325 tons surfaced; 3076 tons dived
- Length: 72.6 m (238 ft)
- Beam: 9.9 m (32 ft)
- Draught: 6.6 m (22 ft)
- Propulsion: 2 × 3,650 hp (2,720 kW) diesel-electric motors; 1 × 5,900 hp (4,400 kW) motor; 2 × 204 hp (152 kW) auxiliary motors; 1 × 130 hp (97 kW) economic speed motor
- Speed: Surfaced; 11 knots (20 km/h); Snorkel Mode; 9 knots (17 km/h); Submerged; 19 knots (35 km/h)
- Range: Snorting: 6,000 mi (9,700 km) at 7 kn (13 km/h); Submerged: 400 miles (640 km) at 3 knots (5.6 km/h)
- Endurance: Up to 45 days with a crew of 52
- Test depth: Operational Depth; 240 m (790 ft); Maximum Depth; 300 m (980 ft)
- Complement: 52 (incl. 13 Officers)
- Armament: 9M36 Strela-3 (SA-N-8) SAM launcher; Klub-S (3M-54E) ASCM; Type 53-65 passive wake homing torpedo; TEST 71/76 anti-submarine, active-passive homing torpedo; 24 DM-1 mines in lieu of torpedo tube

INS Sindhuvijay (S62) (lit. 'Conqueror of the Sea') is a Sindhughosh-class diesel-electric submarine of the Indian Navy. The submarine was commissioned at Riga in the then Soviet Union.

== 2025 Refit ==
As reported on 3 September 2025, the submarine is expected to undergo a refit at the Hindustan Shipyard. While the Navy has acquired the Acceptance of Necessity (AoN) from the Defence Acquisition Council of the Ministry of Defence, the contract finalisation is expected to be completed within two or three weeks. Given that all the procedures are completed on schedule, the submarine is expected to begin its refit by the end of the year. The refits will include hull repair, equipment overhauling, upgrading sensors and weaponry, extending the submarine's life as well as enhancing combat readiness of the vessel. The submarine is to serve another two decades following this refit.
