= INS Sindhughosh =

1985 Sindhughosh-class submarine

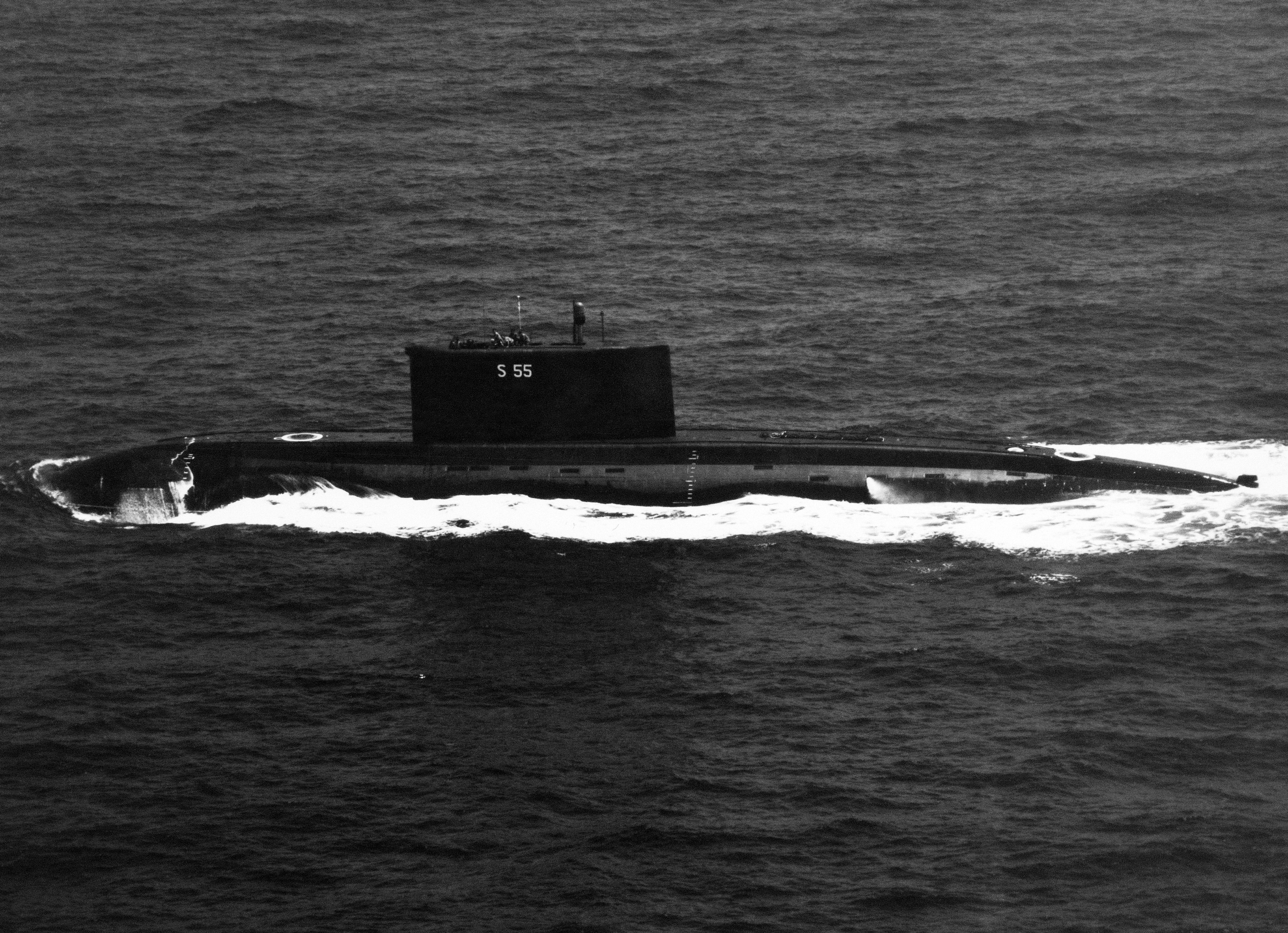

History

India
- Name: INS Sindhughosh
- Namesake: "Roar of the Sea"
- Launched: 29 June 1985
- Commissioned: 30 April 1986
- Decommissioned: 19 December 2025
- Status: Decommissioned

General characteristics
- Class & type: Sindhughosh-class submarine
- Displacement: 2325 tons surfaced, 3076 tons submerged
- Length: 72.6 m (238 ft)
- Beam: 9.9 m (32 ft)
- Draught: 6.6 m (22 ft)
- Propulsion: 2 × 3,650 hp (2,720 kW) diesel-electric motors; 1 × 5,900 hp (4,400 kW) motor; 2 × 204 hp (152 kW) auxiliary motors; 1 × 130 hp (97 kW) economic speed motor
- Speed: Surfaced; 11 knots (20 km/h); Snorkel mode; 9 knots (17 km/h); Submerged; 19 knots (35 km/h)
- Range: Snorting:6,000 mi (9,700 km) at 7 kn (13 km/h); Submerged:400 miles (640 km) at 3 knots (5.6 km/h)
- Endurance: Up to 45 days with a crew of 52
- Test depth: Operational depth; 240 m (790 ft); Maximum depth; 300 m (980 ft)
- Complement: 52 (incl. 13 Officers)
- Armament: 9M36 Strela-3 (SA-N-8) SAM launcher; Klub-S (3M-54E) ASCM; Type 53-65 passive wake homing torpedo; TEST 71/76 anti-submarine, active-passive homing torpedo; 24 DM-1 mines in lieu of torpedo tube

INS Sindhughosh (S55) (lit. 'Roar of the Sea') is the lead ship of her class of diesel-electric submarines of the Indian Navy.

The submarine was commissioned on 30 April 1986 in Riga, Latvia under the command of Commander K C Varghese. The submarine is diesel-powered and has a total of six motors. INS Sindhughosh was the first submarine in Indian Navy to be equipped with the Klub ZM-54E SS-N-27 antiship cruise missiles with a range of 220 kilometres (140 mi). The submarine has a displacement of nearly 3,100 tons when submerged, a maximum diving depth of 300 metres (980 ft), speed of up to 17 knots (31 km/h), and is able to operate solo for 45 days with a crew of 52.

== Service history ==
=== Collision with a foreign vessel (2008) ===
INS Sindhughosh collided with a foreign merchant vessel - MV Leeds Castle - while trying to surface in the seas north of Mumbai on 7 January 2008. The submarine was taking part in fleet level war games when the accident occurred. The boat has reportedly suffered slight damage to the conning tower area. Naval officials said the submarine was submerged and had its radars off and periscope down when it slammed into the merchant vessel off India's Diu Island, 400 nautical miles (740 km) from Mumbai. The boat was apparently maintaining total radio and radar silence to escape detection, when the accident took place. It has also been reported that the indigenously developed USHUS sonar malfunctioned and played a direct role in the accident. A Navy officer, on condition of anonymity, stated that the MV Leeds Castle was in restricted waters and in that area the ocean depth is not great and thus the reason for the mishap. Other naval officials expressed surprise that how in the high seas, the submarine was cruising at only at a depth of 10 to 20 feet (6.1 m). The submarine was towed to a naval dockyard at Mumbai and a Board of Inquiry was ordered to probe the mishap. The crew of INS Sindhughosh had a miraculous escape as the accident was caused at surface level. The reports of structural damage is a cause of concern. Normally the submarine has two hulls. But any damage to structure means checking the entire review of the whole structure. Even if one steel bar has a weakness, the submarine will face adverse conditions at 250 metres (820 ft) below sea level.

=== Fire damage (2013) ===
On 14 August 2013, Sindhughosh sustained minor damage in a fire which caused explosions and the sinking of INS Sindhurakshak, while at dock in Mumbai. The navy did not release any details of the extent of damage on Sindhughosh.

=== Runs aground (2014) ===
On 17 January 2014, INS Sindhughosh ran aground due to the low tide, while returning to Naval Dockyard, Mumbai.

=== Decommissioning ===
Sindhughosh was decommissioned after 40 years of service in Mumbai in the presence of the Western Naval Command chief, Vice Admiral Krishna Swaminathan. The submarine was paid off under the command of Lieutenant Commander Rajat Sharma.
