= INS Sindhuratna =

Indian Navy diesel-electric submarine

History

India
- Name: INS Sindhuratna
- Launched: 15 April 1988
- Commissioned: 22 December 1988
- Status: in active service

General characteristics
- Class & type: Sindhughosh-class submarine
- Displacement: 2325 tons surfaced; 3076 tons dived
- Length: 72.6 m (238 ft)
- Beam: 9.9 m (32 ft)
- Draught: 6.6 m (22 ft)
- Propulsion: 2 × 3,650 hp (2,720 kW) diesel-electric motors; 1 × 5,900 hp (4,400 kW) motor; 2 × 204 hp (152 kW) auxiliary motors; 1 × 130 hp (97 kW) economic speed motor
- Speed: Surfaced; 11 knots (20 km/h); Snorkel Mode; 9 knots (17 km/h); Submerged; 19 knots (35 km/h)
- Range: Snorting: 6,000 mi (9,700 km) at 7 kn (13 km/h); Submerged: 400 miles (640 km) at 3 knots (5.6 km/h)
- Endurance: Up to 45 days with a crew of 52
- Test depth: Operational Depth; 240 m (790 ft); Maximum Depth; 300 m (980 ft)
- Complement: 52 (incl. 13 Officers, 39 Ratings)
- Armament: 9M36 Strela-3 (SA-N-8) SAM launcher; Klub-S (3M-54E) ASCM; Type 53-65 passive wake homing torpedo; TEST 71/76 anti-submarine, active-passive homing torpedo; 24 DM-1 mines in lieu of torpedo tube

INS Sindhuratna (S59) (lit. 'Jewel of the Sea') is a Sindhughosh-class diesel-electric submarine of the Indian Navy.

On 26 February 2014 smoke was detected on Indian Navy submarine INS Sindhuratna off Mumbai coast, and onboard 4-5 sailors were airlifted to a Mumbai hospital after they fell unconscious from suffocation. The senior-most submarine officer of the Western Naval Command was on board. 2 people were killed while 7 were injured. The cause of the fire remains unknown. As per reports, smoke had engulfed compartment No. 3 in the sailors’ accommodation area when the submarine was underwater during a training mission, leading to deaths and injuries.

The two officers killed in the accident were Lt. Commander Kapish Singh Muwal and Lt. Commander Manoranjan Kumar. Their funeral was conducted with full military honors, with the Naval Ensign lowered to half mast.
