= 9K34 Strela-3 =

9K34 Strela-3 SA-N-8
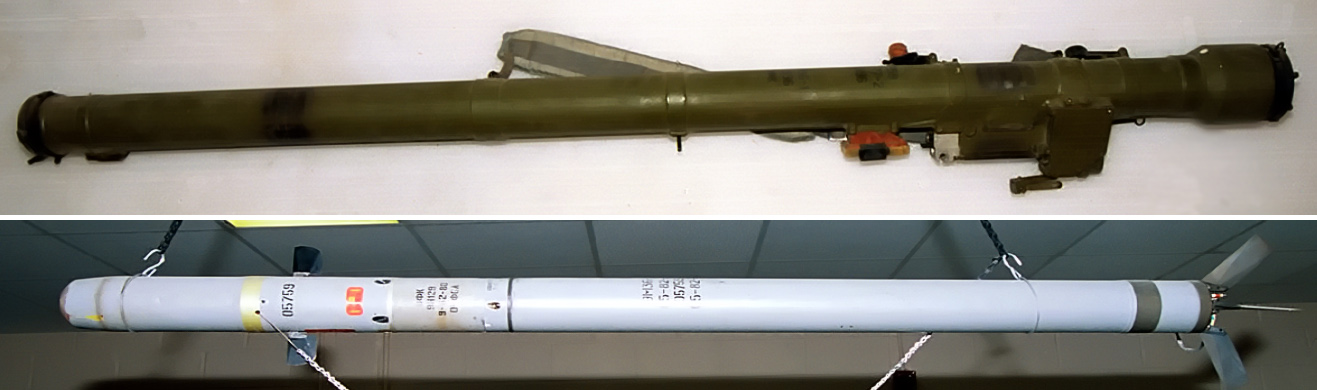
- A 9K34 Strela-3 (SA-14) missile and launch tube.
- Type: Man-portable air-defense systems (MANPADS)
- Place of origin: Soviet Union

Service history
- In service: 1974–present
- Used by: See Operators
- Wars: Angolan Civil War; South African Border War; Iran–Iraq War; Salvadoran Civil War; War in Abkhazia (1992–1993); Yugoslav Wars; Second Congo War; Afghan Civil War; Iraq War

Production history
- Manufacturer: KBM, Kolomna

Specifications
- Mass: Missile weight: 10.3 kilograms (23 lb); Full system: 16.0 kg (35.3 lb)
- Length: 1.47 metres (4.8 ft)
- Operational range: 4,500 metres (14,800 ft)
- Flight altitude: 1,800 metres (5,900 ft) vs. jets 3,000 metres (9,800 ft) vs. slow moving targets
- Maximum speed: 470 metres per second (1,700 km/h; 1,100 mph)

The 9K34 Strela-3 (Russian: 9К34 «Стрела-3», 'arrow', NATO reporting name: SA-14 Gremlin) is a man-portable air defense missile system (MANPADS) developed in the Soviet Union as a response to the poor performance of the earlier 9K32 Strela-2 (SA-7 Grail) system. The missile was largely based on the earlier Strela 2, and thus development proceeded rapidly. The new weapon was accepted into service in the Soviet Army in January 1974.

== Description ==
The most significant change over the Strela 2 was the introduction of an all-new infra-red homing seeker head. The new seeker worked on FM modulation (con-scan) principle, which is less vulnerable to jamming and decoy flares than the earlier AM (spin-scan) seekers, which were easily fooled by flares and even the most primitive infrared jammers. The new seeker also introduced detector element cooling in the form of a pressurized nitrogen bottle attached to the launcher.

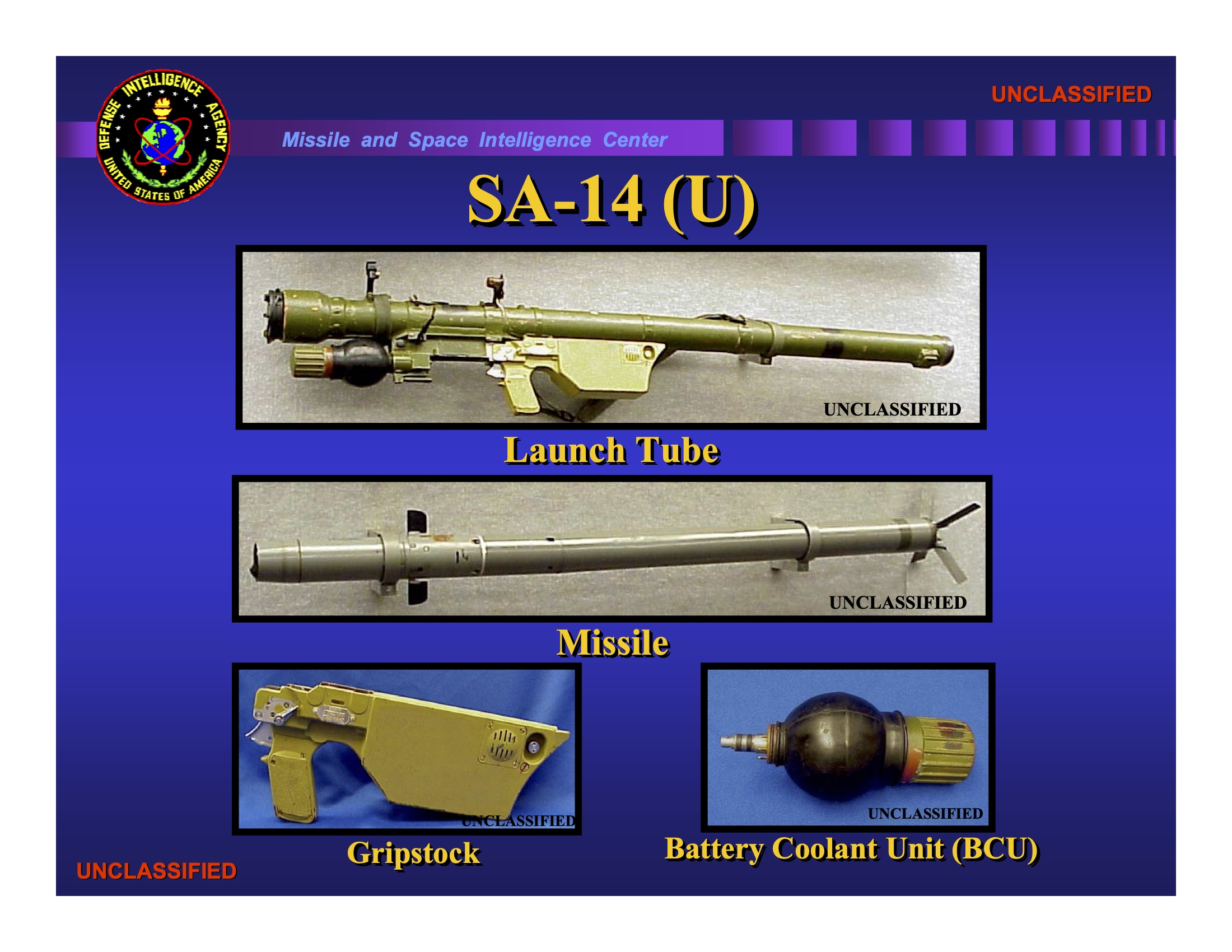
Strela-3 (SA-14) components

The effect of cooling was to expand the seeker's lead sulfide detector element's sensitivity range to longer wavelengths (slightly over 4 μm as opposed to 2.8 μm of uncooled PbS elements). In practice this made possible the tracking of cooler targets over longer ranges, and enabled forward-hemisphere engagement of jets under favourable circumstances. The seeker also had better tracking rate, enabling the missile to track maneuvering of fast and approaching targets.

A negative side effect from the aforementioned improvements was increased missile weight, which caused a slight decrease in the kinematic performance of the original Strela-2 (SA-7). Against relatively slow, low-altitude battlefield air threats the overall effectiveness was much improved.

Strela-3 missiles have been exported to over 30 countries.

The original Strela-3 missile was the 9M36. The follow-on to the Strela-3 was Igla.

The naval version of this missile has the NATO reporting name of SA-N-8.

== Operational history ==
=== Iraq ===
On 22 November 2003 an Airbus A300 cargo plane was hit by a Strela-3 missile after takeoff from Baghdad International Airport, but managed to land safely despite losing hydraulic power.

On 6 May 2006, a British Westland Lynx AH.7 of the Royal Navy from 847 Squadron was shot down with a Strela-3 over Basra, killing five crewmen and crashing into a house.

=== Georgia ===
During the War in Abkhazia (1992–1993), a Russian Mi-8 helicopter was shot down by a Georgian Army SA-14 on December 14, 1992, resulting in the death of 3 crew and 58 passengers, most of them Russian refugees. A Georgian Air Force Su-25 was shot down over Nizhnaya Eshera on 4 July 1993 by SA-14, and several other aircraft on both sides may have been shot down by SA-14s.

=== Former Yugoslavia ===
A British Sea Harrier FRS1 of 801 Naval Air Squadron, operating from aircraft carrier HMS Ark Royal on 16 April 1994, was shot down during its attack on two Republika Srpska T-55 tanks in Bosnia. The pilot, Lieutenant Nick Richardson, ejected and landed in territory controlled by friendly Bosnian Muslims.

=== DR Congo ===
A Zimbabwe Air Force Il-76 was shot down by Congolese rebels using an SA-14 on 11 October 1998 during the Second Congo War, resulting in the death of 40 troops and crew.

=== Afghanistan ===
SA-14s used by the Northern Alliance are credited with having shot down 8 Taliban MiG-21 and Su-22 fighters during the Taliban's 2000 offensive against Taloqan.

=== Iraq ===
A SA-14 (9K34 Strela-3) MANPADS was found during Operation Claw (2019-2020) in June 2019 in the Hakurk region of northern Iraq belonging to the PKK.

== Operators ==
=== Current ===
- Angola
- Azerbaijan
- Bosnia and Herzegovina
- Croatia
- Cuba
- Georgia
- Iran
- Jordan
- Nicaragua
- North Korea
- Peru
- Russia − Used by Ground Forces and Airborne units.
- Syria
- Turkmenistan
- Ukraine

=== Non-state ===
- Hezbollah
- Houthis
- Islamic State

=== Former ===
- Armenia
- Belarus
- Bulgaria − Produced under license.
- Czechoslovakia
- Czech Republic
- East Germany – Never acquired to military service.
- Federal Republic of Yugoslavia
- Finland
- Germany − Former East German stock, used for training only.
- Hungary
- India
- Iraq
- Kazakhstan
- Kyrgyzstan
- Moldova
- Poland
- South Africa
- Soviet Union
- Tajikistan
- United Arab Emirates – Used by the Abu Dhabi Royal Guard.
- Uzbekistan
- Vietnam

=== Non-state former ===
- Farabundo Martí National Liberation Front
- Jamiat-e Islami
- Liberation Tigers of Tamil Eelam
- Revolutionary United Front
- UNITA – Captured from MPLA and Cuban forces in late 1987.
- Kurdistan Workers' Party

== Comparison chart ==
System	9K32M Strela-2M (missile: 9M32M)	9K34 Strela-3 (missile: 9M36)	FIM-43C Redeye
Service entry	1968	1974	1968
Mass, full system, ready to shoot	15 kg	16 kg	13.3 kg
Weight, missile	9.8 kg	10.3 kg	8.3 kg
Length	1.44 m	1.47 m	1.40 m
Warhead	1.15 kg (0.37 kg HMX) directed-energy blast fragmentation	1.17 kg (0.39 kg HMX) directed-energy blast fragmentation, including a 20g secondary charge to set off remaining rocket propellant	1.06 kg M222 (0.36 kg HTA-3) blast fragmentation
Seeker type	AM-modulated (spin scan), uncooled PbS detector element (1–2.8 μm sensitivity range). Tail-chase only.	FM-modulated (con scan), nitrogen-cooled PbS detector element (2–4.3 μm sensitivity range). Limited forward hemisphere (all-aspect) capability	AM-modulated, gas-cooled PbS detector element. Tail-chase only.
Maximum range	4,200 m	4,500 m	4,500 m
Speed	430 m/s	470 m/s	580 m/s
Target's maximum speed, approaching/receding	150/260 m/s	310/260 m/s	–/225 m/s
Engagement altitude	0.05–2.3 km	0.03–3.0 km	0.05–2.7 km

== See also ==
- List of Russian weaponry

== General and cited references ==
- Cullen, Tony; Foss, Christopher F, eds. (1992). Jane's Land-based Air Defence 1992-93 (PDF) (5th ed.). Jane's Information Group. ISBN 978-0-7106-0979-3.
- "Directory of U.S. Military Rockets and Missiles, FIM-43". Archived from the original on 17 April 2008.
- International Institute for Strategic Studies (2016). The Military Balance 2016. Vol. 116. Routledge. ISBN 9781857438352.
- International Institute for Strategic Studies (2024). The Military Balance 2024. Taylor & Francis. ISBN 978-1-040-05115-3.
- O'Halloran, James C.; Foss, Christopher F., eds. (2002). Jane's Land-Based Air Defense 2002-2003 (15th ed.). Janes Information Group. ISBN 978-0-7106-2437-6.
- Petukhov, Sergei I.; Shestov I.V. (1998). Istorija sozdanija i razvitija vooruzhenija i vojennoi tehniki PVO suhoputnyh voisk Rossii, 1.-2 [History of design and development of missile systems and military systems of AAW of Russian Land Forces]. VPK Publishing.
