= Type 53 torpedo =

Family of Russian weapon systems

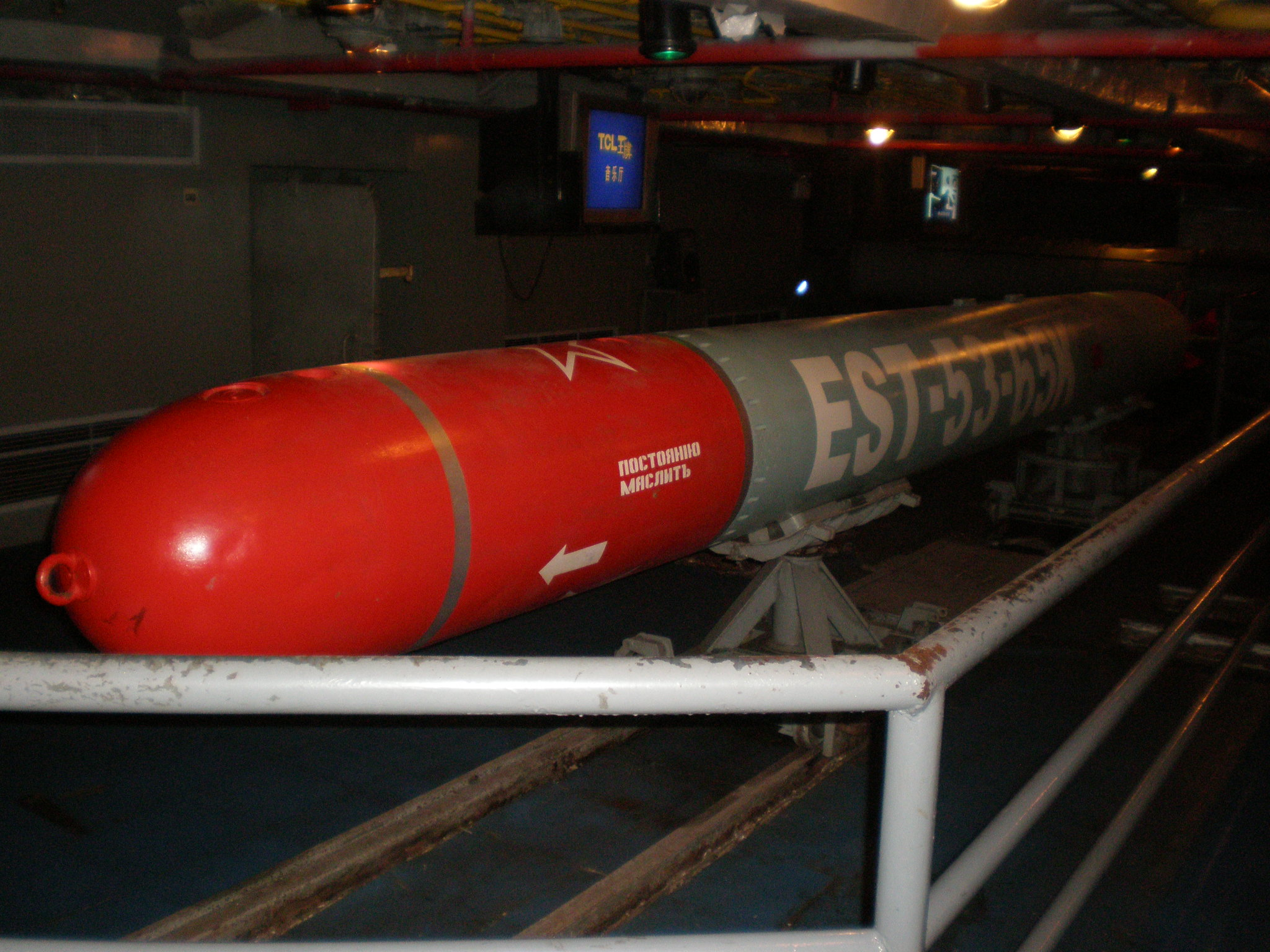
A 53-65K torpedo on display in the torpedo storage areas of the former Soviet aircraft carrier Minsk

Type 53 is the common name for a family of 53 cm (21 inch) torpedoes manufactured in Russia, starting with the 53-27 torpedo and continuing to the modern UGST (Fizik-1), which is being replaced by the Futlyar.

With the exception of the UGST which uses Mark 48 style monopropellants, Soviet 53 cm torpedoes generally use electric power (since middle of World War II), or kerosene mixed with various oxidizers for propulsion. Russian torpedoes are often named descriptively for their characteristics – examples include "acoustic homing" or "electric torpedo", all in Russian acronyms.

== History ==
=== Early history ===
Model 53-27 (1927) with 265 kg (584 lb) of TNT was developed domestically in the so-called Ostekhbureau, and it had a poor 3.7 km (2.0 nmi) range at 45 knots (83 km/h). In 1932 USSR bought in Italy several types of torpedoes, and the 21-inch (530 mm) model of Whitehead Torpedo Factory in Fiume (in the Soviet Union it was designated 53F) was considered superior. After adapting several features from the latter in unsuccessful 53-36 the decision was made to copy 53F. Resulting 53-38 (3 speed regimes, range up to 10 km (5.4 nmi), 300 kg (660 lb) of trotyl in warhead) was later upgraded to 53-38U (400 kg (880 lb) of TNT, roughly the same characteristics) and then redesigned in 53-39 (317 kg (699 lb), up to 51 knots (94 km/h)), considered to be one of the fastest in the world at the time (another were secret Japanese oxygen torpedoes and the Italian Siluro Tipo W. 270/533, 4 × 7,20 Veloce).

=== World War II ===
The 53-38/53-38U, which had entered service in 1938–1939, were the main Soviet torpedoes in World War II; they proved to be fairly reliable and effective. The two deadliest sinkings in history (the German 25,484-ton military transport Wilhelm Gustloff and the troop transport Goya) were performed by two Soviet submarines using 53-38s on 30 January and 16 April 1945; both ships were hit on first attempt and sank within minutes despite difficult visibility conditions and the presence of escorts. Notably, all three torpedoes launched against Wilhelm Gustloff hit and exploded with catastrophic results, not a common feat in those times and conditions.

Another notable sinking with 53-38/53-38Us was the 14,660-ton General von Steuben. During the Black Sea campaigns (1941–44), Soviet submarines sank at least 29,000 tons of enemy shipping, mostly using mines, shellfire and 53-38 torpedoes.

The new 53-39 (entering service in 1941) was very fast and effective but only available in limited numbers, while the ET-80 (1942–1943) was the first Soviet electric torpedo and crews did not trust it because of its teething and rushed induction problems.

=== Cold War ===
The first Soviet torpedo with passive-homing capability was the SAET-50, which was an anti-ship weapon used on submarines. It entered service in 1950 and was based on the German T5 torpedo. Later modified with an improved battery; this torpedo entered service in 1955 as SAET-50M. The 53-61 was the first Soviet homing torpedo to exceed 40 knots.

The 53-65 torpedo family are Russian made, wake-homing torpedoes designed to destroy surface ships. The 53-65 became operational in 1965, while the 53-65K and 53-65M both became operational in 1969. The 53-65KE is an exported version. China received an unknown number of 53-65KE torpedoes from Russia after purchasing four Kilo-class submarines in the 1990s.

The Type 53 torpedo is carried by almost all Russian submarines, including the Kilo class and the Akula-class submarine.

The Type 53-65 torpedo is considered a significant threat by the United States Navy because they do not respond to usual torpedo countermeasures; typical torpedo countermeasures are decoys that use noise to distract homing torpedoes, analogous to an aircraft's flare or chaff systems, but the Type 53-65 uses sensors that follows the wake of a moving ship, snaking through the ship's trail until impacting it, from up to 19.0 km (10.3 nmi) away. The threat of wake homing torpedoes influenced the U.S. Navy to develop the Surface Ship Torpedo Defense (SSTD) system that employs a maneuvering Countermeasure Anti-Torpedo (CAT) that seeks and intercepts an incoming torpedo.

=== UGST ===
The last entry in the class is the UGST (Fizik-1) heavy deepwater torpedo with a range of up to 50 km (27 nmi) (export versions are limited to 40 km). It differs from most previous Soviet and Russian torpedoes in that unlike the previously dominant electric or peroxide propulsion, it uses the Otto fuel axial engine, which allows it to have much extended range while keeping the speeds of up to 65 knots. It also features an updated homing system, which, in addition to the traditional passive wake homing, features a phased array active sonar and an improved wire guidance system: previous Soviet torpedoes had the guidance wire spool in the torpedo body, with the wire released through the hollow propeller shaft, which had the disadvantage of the wire being prone to breakage, while the UGST has the wire release port on the side. Together with the towed extender spool, kept in the calmer portion of the wake, this makes the wire much more durable than before, though not as durable as the tube mounted spool (not used by the Soviets/Russian Navy as it interferes with the automatic reload systems). It was supposed to enter service in the 1990s, but the teething problems and the lack of funding during that period made the deployment sluggish, and it entered the widespread service only in the 2015 by the Fizik name, being quickly replaced by the new-generation Futlyar (Fizik-2). Sources refer to them as heat-seeking torpedoes.

== Variants ==
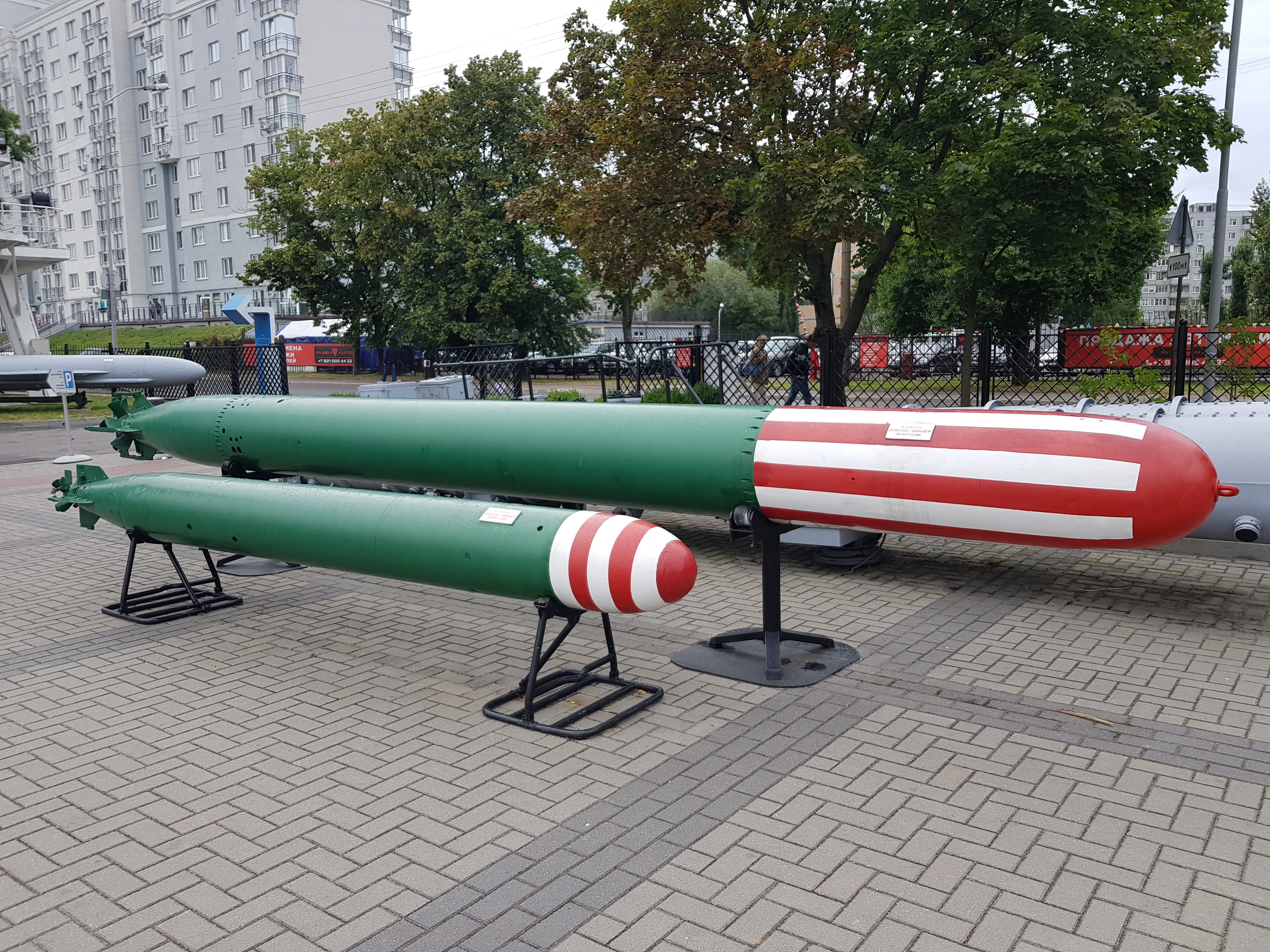
Soviet torpedoes of the types SET-40 (front) and SET-65, as manufactured 1965. The SET-40 carries 80 kg of explosives and has a length of 4,50 metres with a diameter of 400 mm. It travels up to 7,5 km at a speed of 29 knots. Type SET-65 contains 205 kg of explosives, has a length of 7,90 metres and a diameter of 533 mm. It travels up to 15 km at a speed of 40 knots.

- 53-27L (First produced variant)
- 53-38/53-38U/53-59/53-56V and -56VA (Standard straight-running Soviet torpedo of WWII)
- 53-51 (First Soviet torpedo with pattern-running ability)
- 53-57/53-58/53-61 (Primary torpedo development family in the post-war era)
- 53-65/53-65K and -65KE/TT-3 (First mass-produced wake homing Soviet torpedo, included engine improvements)
- SAET-50 (First Soviet anti-ship homing torpedo)
- SET-53/SAET-53 (First Soviet anti-submarine homing torpedo)
- SAET-60/SAET-60M (Anti-ship homing torpedo, improvement over the SET-53 development)
- SET-65 Enot/SET-65M Enot 2 (First effective Soviet anti-submarine homing torpedo, active/passive homing)
- TEST-71 (Standard Soviet/Russian wire guided torpedo, active/passive homing)
- UGST (A 'universal' thermal torpedo, with pumpjet propulsor, active/passive homing)
- USET-80 (Current Russian submarine and surface ship torpedo, active/passive/wake homing)

== 53-65 specifications ==
- Primary function: ASUW torpedo
- Power plant:
  - 53-65 and 53-65M: Kerosene-hydrogen peroxide turbine
  - 53-65K: Kerosene-oxygen turbine
- Length: 7.2 m (24 ft)
- Weight: 2,070–2,300 kg (4,560–5,070 lb)
- Diameter: 533 mm (21.0 in)
- Range:
  - 53-65: 18,000 metres (20,000 yd)
  - 53-65K: 19,000 metres (21,000 yd)
  - 53-65M: 22,000 metres (24,000 yd)
- Speed:
  - 53-65 and 53-65K: 45 kn (83 km/h)
  - 53-65M: 44 kn (81 km/h)
- Guidance system: Wake homing
- Warhead: 307.6 kilograms (678 lb) high explosive
- Operational since:
  - 53-65: 1965
  - 53-65K and 53-65M: 1969
