= History of La Paz =

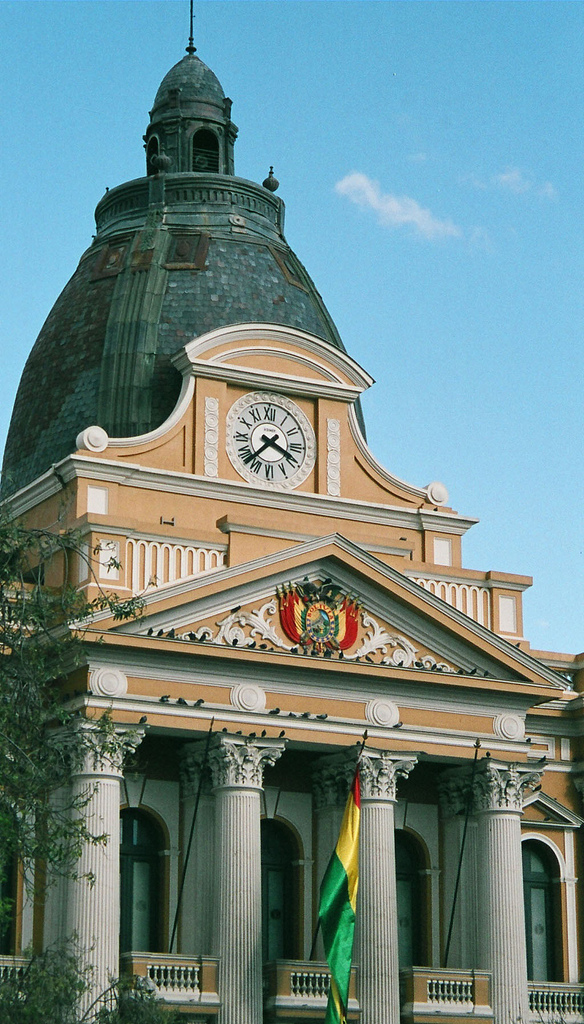
Government Palace of Bolivia in downtown La Paz

La Paz was founded in 1548 by the Spanish conquistadors at the site of the Native American settlement Laja; the full name of the city was originally Nuestra Señora de La Paz (meaning Our Lady of Peace). The name commemorated the restoration of peace following the insurrection of Gonzalo Pizarro and fellow conquistadors four years earlier against Blasco Núñez Vela, the first viceroy of Peru. The city was later moved to its present location in the valley of Chuquiago Marka.

Control over the former Inca lands had been entrusted to Pedro de la Gasca by the Spanish king (and Holy Roman Emperor) Emperor Charles V. Gasca commanded Alonso de Mendoza to found a new city commemorating the end of the civil wars in Peru; the city of La Paz was founded on October 20, 1548.

In 1549, Juan Gutierrez Paniagua was commanded to design an urban plan that would designate sites for public areas, plazas, official buildings, and a cathedral. La Plaza de los Españoles, which is known today as the Plaza Murillo, was chosen as the location for government buildings as well as the Metropolitan Cathedral.

Spain controlled La Paz with a firm grip and the Spanish king had the last word in all matters political. In 1781, for a total of six months, a group of Aymara people laid siege to La Paz. Under the leadership of Tupac Katari, they destroyed churches and government property. Thirty years later, Indians laid a two-month siege on La Paz – where and when the legend of the Ekeko is set. In 1809, the struggle for independence from the Spanish rule brought uprisings against the royalist forces. It was on July 16, 1809 that Pedro Domingo Murillo famously said that the Bolivian revolution was igniting a lamp that nobody would be able to turn off. This formally marked the beginning of the Liberation of South America from Spain. Pedro Domingo Murillo was hanged at the Plaza de los Españoles that night, but his name would be eternally remembered in the name of the plaza, and he would be remembered as the voice of revolution across South America.

In 1825, after the decisive victory of the republicans at Ayacucho over the Spanish army in the course of the Spanish American wars of independence, the city's full name was changed to La Paz de Ayacucho (meaning The Peace of Ayacucho).

In 1898, La Paz was made the de facto seat of the national government, with Sucre remaining the nominal historical as well as judiciary capital. This change reflected the shift of the Bolivian economy away from the largely exhausted silver mines of Potosí to the exploitation of tin near Oruro, and resulting shifts in the distribution of economic and political power among various national elites.

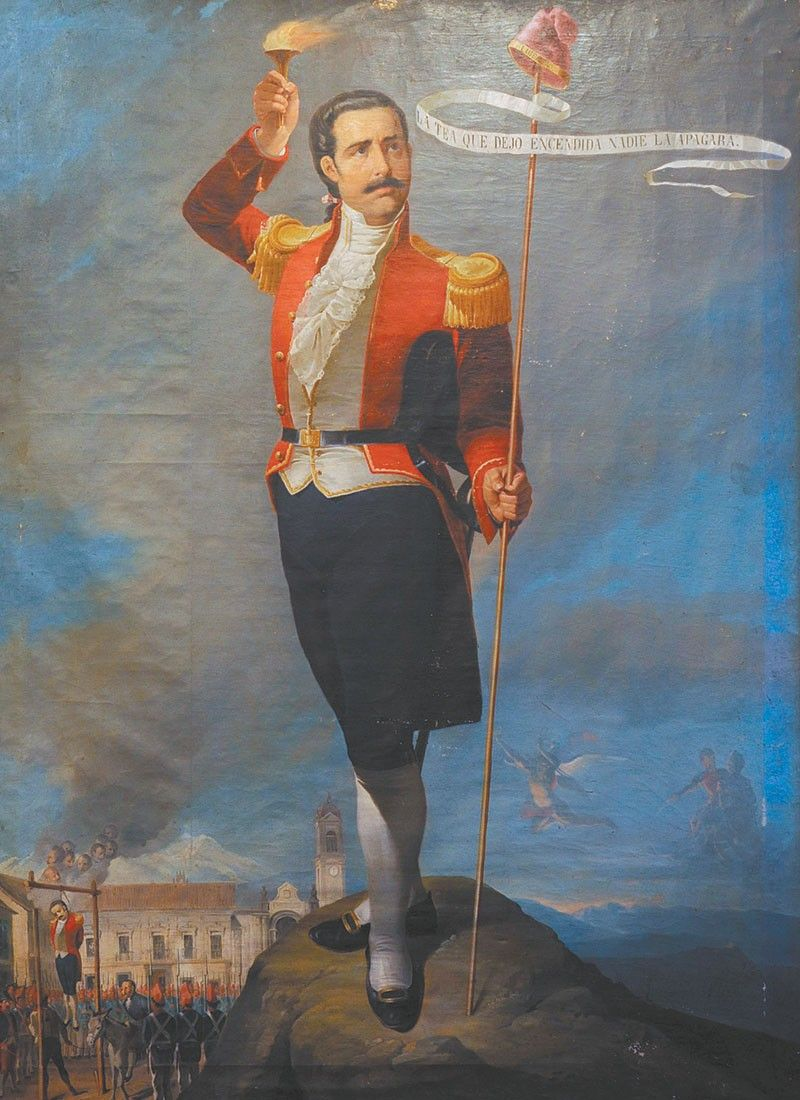
Pedro Domingo Murillo

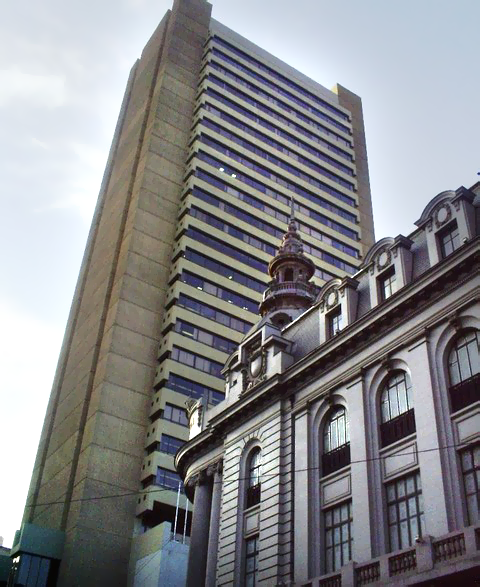
Banco Central de Bolivia

== History of La Paz ==
Year	Event
1548	The city of La Paz was founded by Spanish settlers on the pre- existing site of Choqueyapu, an ancient Aymara village. It was founded as Nuestra Senora de La Paz (Our Lady of Peace) by Alonso de Mendoza, commissioned by Pedro de la Gasca, to commemorate the "pacification" of Peru. It was started as a commercial city, lying on the main gold and silver route to the coast. The Spaniards came for the Bolivian gold found in the Choqueapu River that runs through present-day La Paz. The Spaniards took the gold mines away from Aymara people and made them work as slaves. The primarily male Spanish population soon mixed with the indigenous people, creating a largely mestizo, or mixed, population.
1549	In November of this year, Juan Gutierrez was given the task of designing an urban plan, in keeping with the Code of the Indies (regulations on Spanish Colonial Cities from Spain). As such, he was to lay out plazas and public lands and designate sites for public buildings. The Plaza Murillo (pictured below) was later selected as the site for the city Cathedral, elite homes, and government buildings.
1600	As the gold slowly diminished, the city's location between Potosi (the primary silver mining town) and Lima grew in importance, as La Paz became a main stop on the trade route. Soon La Paz was the most flourishing town in the Altiplano area of the Andes, although it was not as wealthy as Potosi.
1800	La Paz emerges as the largest city of Upper Peru (the early name for Bolivia) in the late 18th century, acting as the center for the population and agricultural production zone. The heavily populated Altiplano hinterland above La Paz fed its growth. Many large estate land holders, known as hacendados, lived in La Paz throughout most of the year while they maintained a small community of indigenous people to live and work on their haciendas (landed estates).
1800	La Paz emerged as the capital of the Intendencia, the home of a thriving commercial community, and the center of an important network of interregional and international trade routes. The majority of the absentee landed elite resided in La Paz, creating the commerce and royal treasury from which more wealth could be generated for investment in the rural zones of the Intendencia. At that time in history, the capital and its provincial hinterland were one of the wealthiest tax-producing areas in all of the Andes. This early beginning, as the home of the rich land-lords of the haciendas, is still evident in the structure of the city today, as the finest example of old Spanish Colonial Architecture seen in houses is located close to the central plazas and offices of the city.
1809	July 16: One of the first South American libertarian screams against the Spanish Crown is given in La Paz, in a rebellion led by Pedro Domingo Murillo and the others revolutionaries.
1825	Bolivia gained independence, which sparked even more growth in the city. Simón Bolívar was the first president of the Republic. The country was divided in 5 departments: La Paz, Cochabamba, Potosí, Charkas and Santa Cruz de la Sierra.
1840	Bolivia started exporting more than it imported, allowing the government to engage in infrastructural investments with the surplus funds. This led to a growth of La Paz as the financial, commercial, and political capital of the area. "With new urban classes emerging, and new capital to spend, there was both increased demands for foodstuffs production and an aggressive class of urban-based capitalists willing to engage in agricultural production"(Klien 1993 134). However, at this time La Paz was virtually isolated from the rest of the world due to the poor roads and lack of rail lines leading over the harsh Altiplano to ports in Peru and Chile. Contact between La Paz and the eastern part of the country, surrounded by rainforest, was even more difficult.
1879	The War of the Pacific with Chile. The Chileans entered the country at the coast for the salitre and the guano (Nitrate-rich bird dung). The result of this brutal war was the loss of Bolivia's coast land to Chile.
1898	La Paz becomes de facto Bolivia's new administrative capital and the seat of the government, thus starting the process of development into the large city it is today.
1900	Construction began on the international railroad network linking La Paz to the Pacific and Atlantic coasts, thus solidifying the future role of La Paz as a primate city. At this period in time the Bolivian government spent an annual spendings of $5,986,384.
1921	The first oil company came to Bolivia. Bolivia was found to have great reservoirs of oil, in addition to all the precious minerals.
1952	The great national revolution when the revolutionaries won the rights for the indigenous people. Their biggest accomplishment was agrarian land reform, which allowed peasants to have freedom from the obligations of working on the elite-owned land, diffusing the long-established hacienda system. This in turn sparked a great growth spurt in the city, as many working-class and poor migrated to urban areas.
1963	Playing at home, Bolivia wins South American football (soccer) championships.
1964	Military revolution, with the help of the United States, that established the dictatorial rule that would remain until 1980. The last dictator was General Hugo Banzer. He held elections in 1980, although, suspiciously, Banzer's candidate won and was president until the year 1982.
1975	Population: 660,700 (approximate).
2009	La Paz City met the Bicentenary, celebrating in Plaza Villarroel and in the Stadium the 1809 revolution.
2013	Air pollution in La Paz reaches annual mean of 44 PM2.5 and 82 PM10, more than recommended.
