= Charka =

Charka may refer to:

- Charka, Jangipur, town in India
- An obsolete unit of liquid measure in Russia
- Satya Narayana Charka, Indian Kathak dancer

== See also ==
- Charkha (disambiguation)
- Charkas, a village in Kermanshah Province, Iran
