= Revenue stamps of Bolivia =

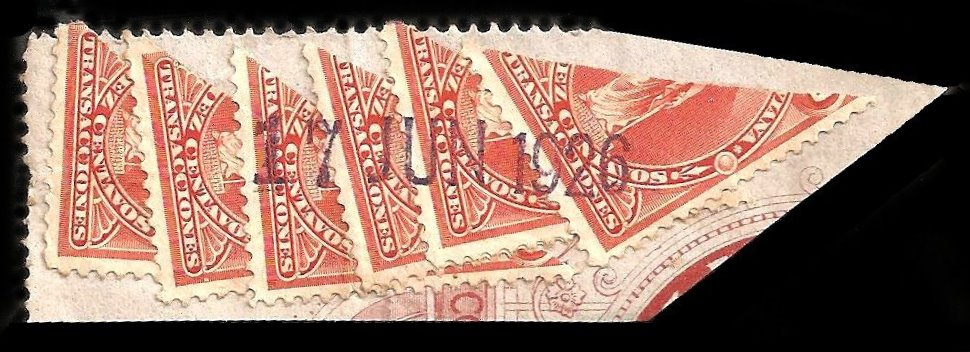
Six bisected 1924 revenue stamps from Bolivia, used on piece 1926.

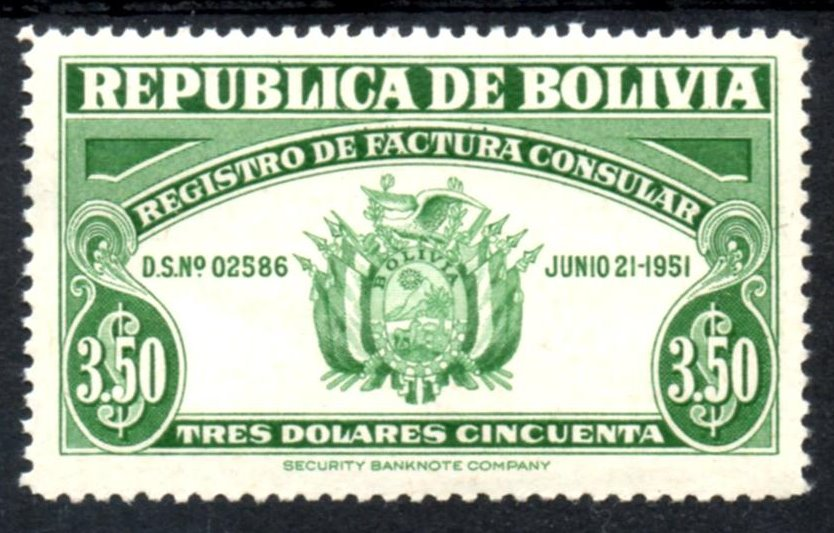
A 1951 consular invoice revenue stamp of Bolivia.

Bolivia has issued revenue stamps since 1867.

== See also ==
- Postage stamps and postal history of Bolivia
