= Vir =

Vir or VIR may refer to:

== Places ==
- Vir (island), an island on the Croatian coast of the Adriatic Sea
- Vir (municipality), the settlement on the Croatian island
- Vir, Posušje, a village in Bosnia and Herzegovina
- Vír, a municipality and village in the Czech Republic
- Vir, Markazi, a village in Iran
- Vir, Zanjan, a village in Iran
- Vir, Nikšić, a village in Montenegro
- Vir, Domžale, a settlement in Slovenia
- Vir pri Nevljah, a village in Slovenia
- Beli Vir, a village near Kardzhali, Bulgaria
- Bijeli Vir, a village near Metković, Croatia
- Krivi Vir, a village near Zaječar, Serbia
- Lepenski Vir, an archaeological site in Serbia
- Sinji Vir, a village near Paraćin, Serbia
- VIR, the ISO 3166-1 alpha-3 country code for United States Virgin Islands

== Transport ==
- VIR, the ICAO code for Virgin Atlantic, a British airline
- Virginia International Raceway, a race track in Virginia, United States
- Virginia Water railway station, in England
- Virginia Airport in Durban, South Africa

== People ==
- Vir Das, Indian comedian and actor
- Vir Phoha, Indian American computer scientist
- Vir Sanghvi, Indian writer
- Parminder Vir, Indian-British business executive

== Other uses ==
- Vir, abbreviation for Virgo (constellation)
- Vir (crustacean), a genus of shrimps
- Vir Cotto, a character in the science fiction television series Babylon 5
- Victoria Imperatrix Regina, Latin name for Queen Victoria
- Vertical interval reference, inserted data for color correction in the NTSC television standard
- VIR cable, a type of electrical cable (Vulcanised Indian Rubber)
- Vir: The Robot Boy, Indian TV series

== See also ==
- Wir (disambiguation)
- Veer (disambiguation)
- Param Vir Chakra (disambiguation)
- Vir gloriosus
- Vir illustris
- Vir militaris
- Et vir
