= K-152 Nerpa accident =

2008 submarine accident

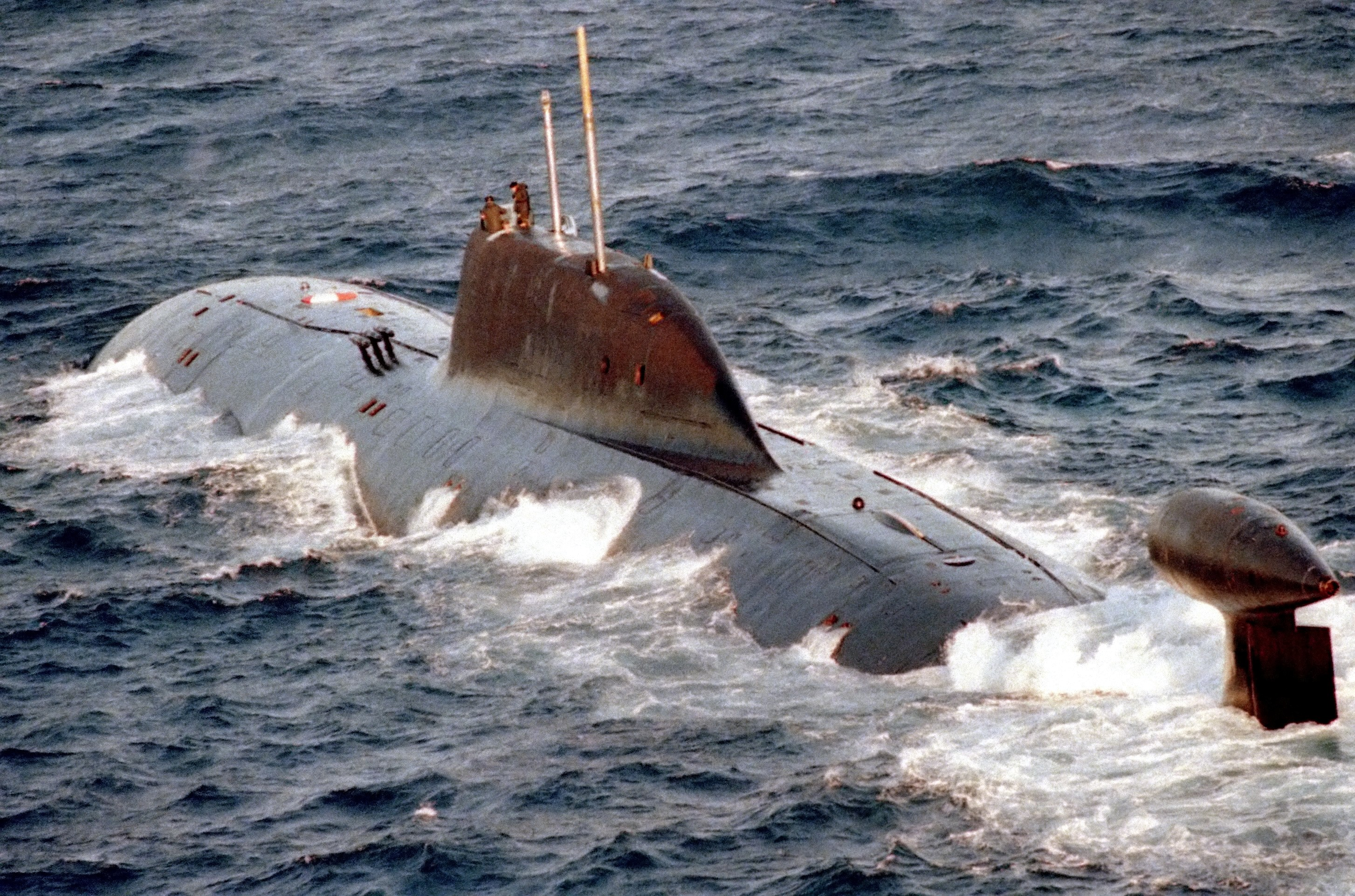
- An Akula-class submarine similar to K-152 Nerpa
- Date: 8 November 2008
- Time: 08:30 pm local time
- Location: Peter the Great Gulf, Sea of Japan, off the coast of Primorski Krai
- Deaths: 20
- Injuries: 41
- Accident occurred on board the Russian submarine K-152 Nerpa

The K-152 Nerpa accident occurred aboard the Russian submarine K-152 Nerpa on 8 November 2008, which resulted in the deaths of 20 people and injuries to 41 more. The accident was blamed on a crew member who was allegedly playing with a fire suppressant system that he thought was not operative.

Halon gas was released inside two compartments of the submerged submarine during the vessel's sea trials in the Sea of Japan, asphyxiating the victims or causing frostbite in their lungs. The high casualty count was attributed in part to the large number of civilians on board who were assisting with the testing before commissioning. Three of the dead were Russian naval personnel and the rest were civilian employees of the Vostok, Zvezda, Era, and Amur shipbuilding yards. The incident was the worst Russian submarine disaster since the sinking of Kursk in 2000.

== Sequence of events ==
At the time of the accident, Nerpa was undergoing sea trials at the Russian Pacific Fleet's test range in Peter the Great Gulf, an inlet of the Sea of Japan adjoining the coast of Russia's Primorski Krai province. The vessel had not yet been commissioned by the Russian Navy and was undergoing plant tests under the supervision of a team from the Amur shipyard. For this reason, it had a much larger than usual complement aboard, totaling 208 people, 81 military personnel and 127 civilian engineers from the shipyards responsible for building and outfitting the submarine.

The accident occurred at 8:30 pm local time on 8 November 2008, during the submarine's first underwater test run. The submarine's fire extinguishing system was triggered, sealing two forward compartments and filling them with R-114B2 gas (dibromotetrafluoroethane, known as khladon in Russian). The gas, a haloalkane refrigerant, is used in the Russian Navy's LOKh (lodochnaya obyemnaya khimischeskaya – "submarine volumetric chemical") fire-suppressant system. Each compartment of a Russian submarine contains a LOKh station from which the gas can be delivered into that or adjacent compartments. The gas displaces oxygen and chemically interferes with combustion, enabling it to extinguish fires rapidly in enclosed spaces. In high concentrations, it can cause narcosis, which progresses by stages into excitation, mental confusion, lethargy, and ultimately asphyxiation.

Twenty people died of asphyxiation in the accident. The number of injured was initially put at 21 but was later revised to 41 by the Amurskiy Shipbuilding Company, some of whose employees were among the injured. Many of the injured were reported to have suffered from frostbite caused by the chilling effect of the gas.

Following the incident, the Udaloy-class destroyer Admiral Tributs and the rescue vessel Sayany were dispatched from Vladivostok to provide assistance to the stricken submarine. The injured survivors were transferred to the destroyer and sent to military hospitals for treatment, while the submarine returned under its own power to Primorsky Krai. According to naval spokesman Igor Digaylo, the vessel was not damaged in the incident and radiation levels remained normal.

== Causes ==
Two principal explanations of the disaster have been advanced by naval experts and the media—an equipment failure or human error.

=== Equipment failure ===
The LOKh fire suppression system aboard Nerpa was reportedly of a new type that had not previously been used aboard any Russian submarine. Earlier versions of the LOKh system only operate under manual control from the duty shift console. The new system installed on Nerpa could also operate in automatic mode, responding to smoke and rises in compartment temperature and activating individually in each compartment. According to the testimony of an engineer from the Zvezda shipyard, this had malfunctioned before while the submarine was being readied for its sea trials. Some commentators speculated that the system could have been accidentally activated.

=== Human error ===
On 10 November 2008, a Russian Navy statement blamed the disaster on an "unsanctioned operation" of the fire suppression system aboard Nerpa. Three days later, naval investigators announced that a crewman, named unofficially as Dmitry Grobov, had turned on the system "without permission or any particular grounds". According to reports in the Russian media, Grobov believed that a local control unit was not connected. Out of boredom, he started playing with it. The submarine local control units are protected by five-digit access numbers, but during sea trials, the access codes were penciled on the units. The seaman increased readings up from the original value of 30°C to 78°C, causing the control system to believe that a fire was on board. The control unit requested permission to start the fire-suppression system. Grobov granted permission, possibly without realizing what he was doing. He was charged and would face up to seven years in prison if convicted.

In April 2013, Grobov was acquitted by a jury. This trial followed an earlier not guilty verdict on September 14, 2011. The 2011 verdict was overruled by the Supreme Court's military board in May 2012, leading to the April retrial.

Colleagues expressed skepticism at this accusation, describing the accused crewman as an experienced and skilled specialist. A number of retired naval officers told the business daily Kommersant that they doubted that Grobov was solely to blame, as one person could not activate the system due to it requiring multiple levels of confirmation before it can be activated.

== Exacerbating factors ==
According to survivors, those affected by the gas release were caught off guard and may not have been alerted in time due to warning sirens sounding only after the gas had already begun pouring in. Some of the victims were reported to have been unable to don breathing kits before they suffocated.

Igor Kurdin, a former Typhoon-class submarine commander and the current head of the St. Petersburg Submariners Club, attributed the high casualty count to the presence of a large number of civilian specialists on the submarine at the time of the accident. Seventeen of 20 people who perished in the accident were civilians. He noted that civilian observers would be untrained in the proper response to the release of the boat's firefighting gas, which would be preceded by a specific light and sound signal, after which all on board are supposed to put on oxygen masks to allow them to survive during the 30-minute period required to ventilate the compartments before they can be reopened. In addition, because the accident occurred at 8:30 pm, many of the civilian specialists and crewmen would likely have been asleep, and unable to don their oxygen masks in time. The accident is the country's worst since the controversial 12 August 2000, sinking of the Russian nuclear submarine Kursk.

Mikhail Barabanov, editor-in-chief of Moscow Defense Brief, said the potential for accidental discharge of the fire-suppression system on Russian submarines is not unheard of, but this type of incident does not normally result in fatalities. However, Nerpa was carrying what he described as a "crowd of civilians" on board. The presence of the civilian shipbuilding contractors in addition to the military crewmen resulted in the vessel becoming "overcrowded". His estimation of the events that compounded the loss of life were: "the fire alarm failed to work, so passengers did not realize that the gas started to displace oxygen in the affected compartments." Some suggested that not enough breathing kits had been available for the larger than usual number of people aboard, or that the civilians had not been properly trained in their use. Survivors stated that some breathing apparatuses had not worked or had failed after only a few minutes; some of the dead were reportedly found still wearing their breathing kits.

== Official reactions ==
=== Russia ===
Russian President Dmitry Medvedev ordered Defence Minister Anatoliy Serdyukov to undertake an immediate investigation into the causes of the accident. Colonel General Aleksandr Kolmakov, the First Deputy Minister of Defence, and Admiral Vladimir Vysotsky, the Navy Commander-in-Chief, were sent to the Far East region to oversee the investigation. The President also ordered Prosecutor General Yuriy Chayka to undertake a criminal investigation of the incident and a team of officers from the Main Military Procuracy were sent to investigate the case. The Russian Navy and the governments of the Primorsky Krai and Khabarovsk Krai regions announced compensation packages to assist the families of those who lost their lives in the accident.

=== India ===
Initially, there were reports in Russian and Indian media of a crew from the Indian Navy heading to Vladivostok later in November 2008, where they will start "trainings and preparations" aboard Nerpa. These reports came amid speculations that Russia might lease a newly built nuclear submarine to India. Reports later confirmed that the submarine which suffered the accident was indeed the one which was planned to be leased to India.

Indian naval officials said, "Our officials are already in Russia monitoring the submarine project; both during its construction phase and now during the sea trial phase. We are keeping a close watch on the developments."

Opinions were divided among analysts about the effect that the accident would have on military relations with India. A Russian defense analyst remarked that it was unlikely that the incident "would scare India away." On the other hand, Golts stated, "I think this is going to be another serious blow to cooperation with India. India will be even more concerned about the quality of Russian weapons." He also stated that India had desired secrecy, lest the United States apply pressure to scuttle the deal, but that with no other suppliers of such submarines, India would probably still accept the deal. The planned lease of the submarine to India was in 2008 reported to be cancelled following the incident. However, the submarine was officially inducted into the Indian Navy on 4 April 2012 as INS Chakra.
