= Chakradhar =

Chakradhar means holder of Chakra that is Vishnu. As a given name or surname, it may refer to the following people:

- Chakri (composer) (born as Chakradhar, 1974–2014), Indian music composer and singer
- Chakradhar Behera (1894–1973), Indian independence activist and politician
- Chakradhar Deka (1963–2007), Indian film director and writer
- Chakradhar Gogoi, Indian politician
- Chakradhar Swami, Indian philosopher, founder of the Mahanubhava sect in Vaishnavism
- Chakradhar Satapathy (died 2006), Indian former politician
- Chakradhar Singh (1905–1947), ruler of Raigarh princely state in India
- Ashok Chakradhar (born 1951), Hindi author and poet

== See also ==
- Chakradhaar, a 2012 Indian film
- Chakradhari (disambiguation)
- Chakradharpur, a city and a municipality in the state of Jharkhand, India
