= Chakra (disambiguation) =

Chakra is a focal point in ancient meditation practices of Indian religions.

Chakra may also refer to:

- Sudarshana Chakra or chakra, a discus weapon used by the Hindu deity Vishnu

== Arts and entertainment ==
- Chakra (1981 film), a 1981 Indian Hindi-language film
- Chakra (2016 film), a 2016 Indian film
- Chakra (2021 film), an Indian Tamil-language action thriller film
- Chakra: The Invincible, an Indian animated superhero film
- Chakra (group), a South Korean musical group
  - Chakra (album), 2002
- Chakra (trance duo), a British music group
- Chakrā, a group of Melakarta ragas, fundamental musical scales in Carnatic music
- Chakras, a 2018 song by Kanye West from Yandhi

== Computing ==
- Chakra (JScript engine), developed by Microsoft for Internet Explorer 9
- Chakra (JavaScript engine), developed by Microsoft for Microsoft Edge
- Chakra (operating system), a Linux distribution
- Chakra Petch, a Thai typeface in the National Fonts project.

== Other uses ==
- Chakra (chess variant)
- Chakra River, western India
- Georges Chakra, a Lebanese haute couture fashion designer
- INS Chakra, the name of two submarines of the Indian Navy
- Shaqra, Lebanon, a village in southern Lebanon

== See also ==
- Chakram (disambiguation)
- Chakri (disambiguation)
- Charkha (disambiguation)
- Chakradhari (disambiguation)
- Chakravyuha (disambiguation)
- Chakravakam (disambiguation)
- Param Vir Chakra (disambiguation)
- Chacra, a Spanish term for a small or garden farm
  - Chacra, a CDP in Colorado
