= Russian submarine Nerpa (K-152) =

Russian Akula-class submarine

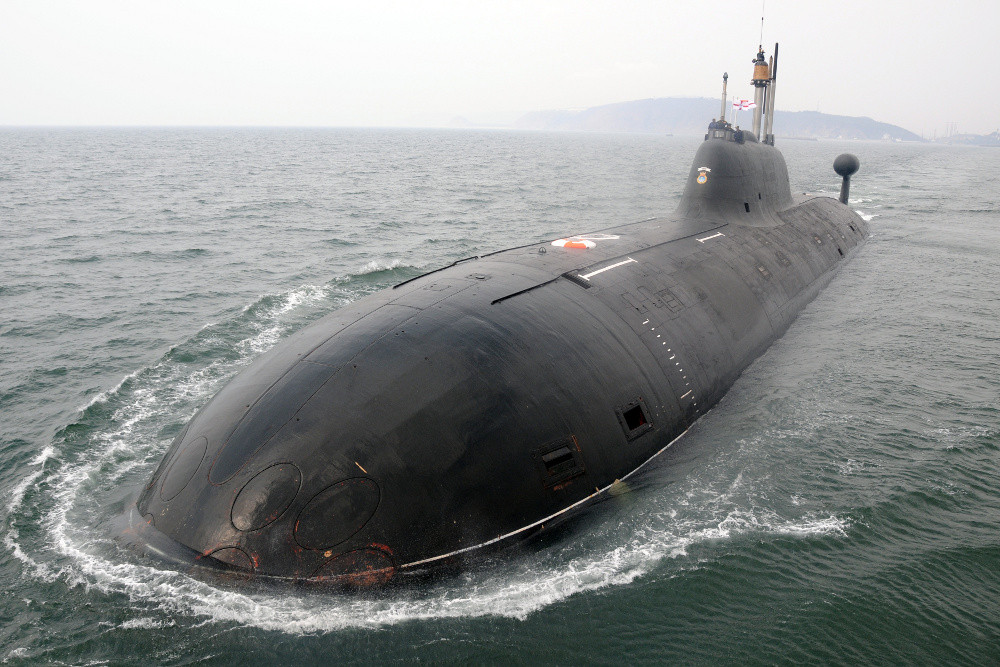
- INS Chakra

History

Russia
- Name: K-152 Nerpa
- Namesake: Baikal seal
- Builder: Amur Shipbuilding Plant, Komsomolsk-on-Amur
- Laid down: 1993
- Launched: October 2008
- Commissioned: 2009
- Home port: Vilyuchinsk
- Fate: Leased to the Indian Navy for 10 years in 2012, returned in June 2021; likely inactive

India
- Name: Chakra
- Namesake: Sudarshana Chakra
- Commissioned: 4 April 2012
- Home port: Visakhapatnam
- Status: Returned to Russia, June 2021

General characteristics
- Type: Nuclear-powered attack submarine
- Displacement: 8,140 tonnes (8,010 long tons) surfaced
- Length: 108.0–111.7 m (354.3–366.5 ft) (sources vary)
- Beam: 13.5 m (44 ft 3 in)
- Draught: 9.6 m (31 ft 6 in)

Nerpa (renamed INS Chakra in Indian Navy service) is a 8,140-tonne (8,010-long-ton) Project 971 (or Project 518; NATO: Akula-class) nuclear-powered attack submarine. The construction of the submarine was started in Russia in 1993, but was suspended due to lack of funding. India then sponsored further construction and sea trials of the submarine provided it was leased to the Indian Navy for 10 years. It was launched as K-152 Nerpa in October 2008 and entered service with the Russian Navy in late 2009. The submarine was leased to the Indian Navy in 2011 after extensive trials, and was formally commissioned into service as INS Chakra with the Eastern Naval Command at a ceremony in Visakhapatnam on 4 April 2012. The similarly named Chakra was a Charlie I-class submarine leased by India from Russia from 1988 to 1992.In June 2021 Chakra was spotted on the surface escorted by Indian and Russian warships in the Singapore Strait while presumably heading towards the Russian naval base in Vladivostok; some media speculated that she was returning to Russia before the expiry of the lease term.

While Nerpa was undergoing sea trials in the Sea of Japan on 8 November 2008, a fire suppression system was accidentally activated, killing 20 civilian specialists and navy crew members and injuring 41 others.

== Construction ==
Nerpa was laid down at the Komsomolsk-on-Amur shipyard in 1991, but its completion was delayed for nearly a decade due to a lack of funds caused by the economic crisis of the early 1990s. The partly constructed vessel was mothballed until 2004, when Rosprom (the Federal Agency for Industry) signed an agreement with the Indian government to complete the submarine and lease it to the Indian Navy. The vessel was intended to be completed by 2007, but underwent further delays. In 2007, it was transferred to the Vostok shipyard in the closed city of Bolshoy Kamen, Primorsky Krai, for fitting-out. It was launched in October 2008 for sea trials, following which it was due to be handed over to the Russian Defence Ministry. Reports in the Indian media suggest that the resumption of construction was underwritten with Indian funding.

The standard of the vessel's construction were criticised by several commentators. Aleksandr Golts, defence editor of the Yezhednevny Zhurnal newspaper, said that in the 1980s, the Amur shipyard turned out submarines "one after another, like pancakes," but from 1993 to 2008 had produced just one. "The old specialists had left, and the new ones lacked professionalism." An unnamed worker at the Amur shipyard told Komsomolskaya Pravda that there were "questions about the quality of the metal that was used in building the nuclear submarine", some of which had been bought from China, and alleged that "when the first trials of the submarine were carried out water was leaking in between the seams! So it is not surprising that the work dragged on."

During May 2009, the repairs were reported to be almost complete, and new sea trials were carried out in July of the same year. By October 2009, the work had still not been completed due to the shipyard's electrical supply having been disconnected. Nikolay Povzyk, the head of the shipyard, complained they had not been paid the 1.9 billion rubles (63.8 million dollars) owed for the work carried out on Nerpa.

== Lease to India ==
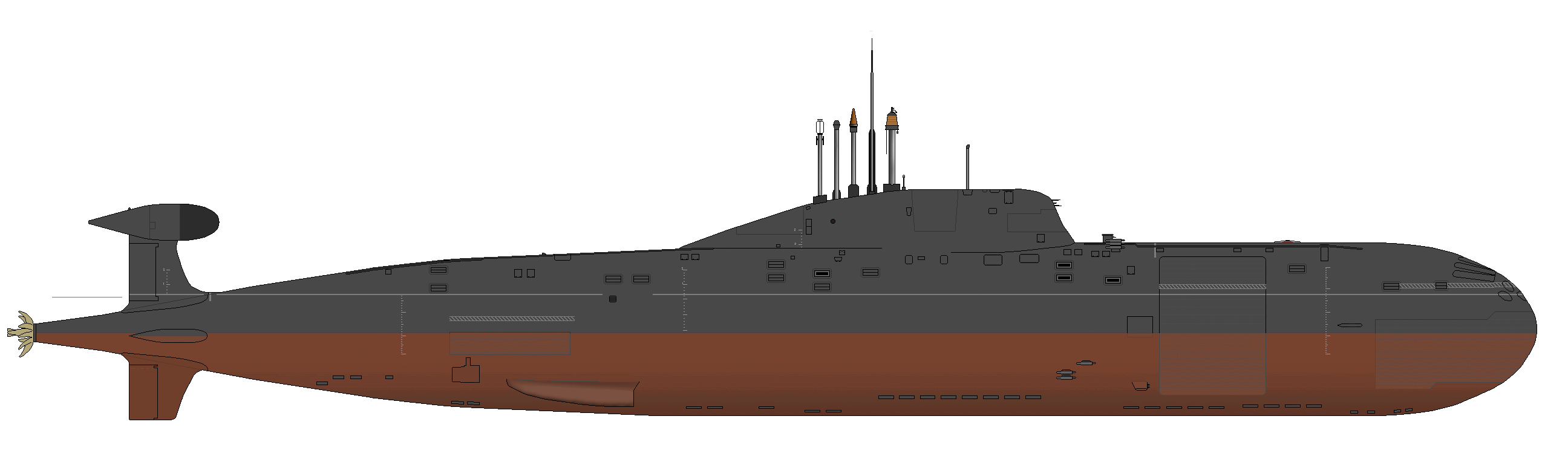
INS Chakra of the Indian Navy

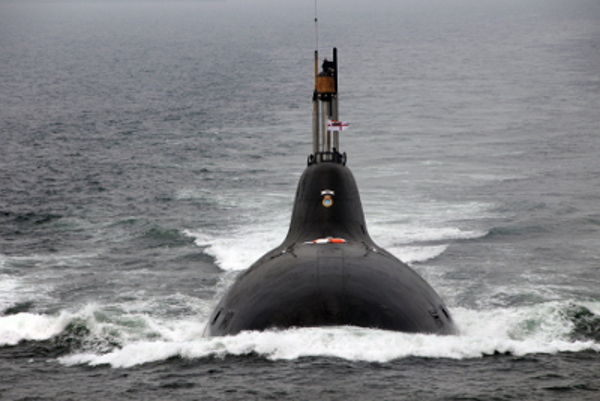
Chakra in the open sea, flying the Indian Naval Ensign

In 2008, Russia had an agreement pending with India worth US$2 billion for the lease of Nerpa and another Project 971 Shchuka-B-class submarine. Of this, K-152 Nerpa would be leased for 10 years to India at an estimated cost of US$670 million. The submarine was handed over to India on 30 December 2011. After being handed over to the Indian Navy, it was commissioned as INS Chakra. Nerpa is the Russian word for the Baikal seal, and Chakra is the weapon of the Hindu god Vishnu.

Indian naval crews earlier trained to operate the submarine near St Petersburg and another group of sailors were expected to arrive in Vladivostok in late 2008 for sea trials. The training of the crew was viewed as crucial to India's own nuclear submarine programme, known as the Arihant-class.

=== 2008 accident ===
Russian submarine Nerpa
- Date: 8 November 2008
- Location: Pacific Ocean, Sea of Japan, off the coast of Vladivostok
- Deaths: 20
- Injuries: 21
- Accident occurred on board the Russian submarine K-152 Nerpa

An accident occurred aboard K-152 Nerpa at 8:30 PM local time on 8 November 2008, during an underwater test run in the Pacific Ocean. A total of 208 people – 81 military personnel and 127 civilians – were on board at the time of the accident. At least 20 people were killed by asphyxiation and at least 21 more were injured, making it the worst Russian submarine disaster since Kursk sank in 2000. Three of the dead were military personnel and the rest were civilians from the Vostok, Zvezda, Era and Amur shipbuilding yards who were members of the acceptance team.

The incident involved the accidental triggering of a fire extinguishing system which sealed two forward compartments and released Halon 2402 (Freon R-114B2), dibromotetrafluoroethane gas into them. According to survivors, those affected by the gas release were caught off guard and may not have been alerted in time due to warning sirens sounding only after the gas had already begun pouring in. Some of the victims were reported to have been unable to turn on breathing kits before they suffocated.

On 10 November, a Russian Navy statement blamed the disaster on an "unsanctioned operation" of the fire suppression system aboard Nerpa. Preliminary investigations concluded that the system had triggered automatically without human intervention. On 13 November, naval investigators announced that a crewman had turned on the system "without permission or any particular grounds".

=== Induction ===
In May 2009, both Russian and Indian defence officials confirmed that Nerpa would be joining the Indian Navy by the end of 2009, after Russian President Vladimir Putin visited the yard and announced an immediate release of 1.2 billion rubles for the submarine's construction.

On 28 December 2009, Nerpa was commissioned and joined the Russian Navy. By August 2010, Russia was training a crew from the Indian Navy to sail the boat to India in fulfilment of the lease agreement. INS Chakra was expected to be commissioned into the Indian Navy before October 2011. On 1 July 2011, Russian Navy chief Admiral Vladimir Vysotsky was quoted as holding that the Indian crew is now absolutely prepared for operating the submarine, which will be on a 10-year lease.

On 23 January 2012, the ship was commissioned at Bolshoy Kamen under the command of Captain P. Ashokan. She commenced her home voyage under Indian control from the Russian port of Vladivostok to its Indian base at Visakhapatnam. An official Russian announcement of the transfer was still pending at that time. INS Chakra was inducted into the Indian Navy on 4 April 2012.

The Nerpa was returned to Russia in June 2021, ahead of the expiry of the 10 year lease, due to "increasingly unreliable powerplant and maintenance issues" besides the overall condition of the vessel which was extensively used by the Indian Navy to train crews on advanced nuclear submarines. According to other sources, the main reason for the early return was an explosion of a high-pressure air cylinder in the spring of 2020. The cylinder was located between the two hulls and its explosion killed a crew member and damaged electronic weapons, hydro-acoustic equipment and the hulls.

=== 2017 accident ===
Indian media aired public reports in early October 2017 that indicated that INS Chakra had suffered damage while entering Visakhapatnam harbour, including a large hole in the sonar dome in the bow. A Russian team visited India for a joint investigation, which led to the submarine being dry docked for repairs at a cost of ₹125 crore ($20 million) to fix the damage.

=== 2019 ===
After the 2019 Balakot airstrike that was conducted by the Indian Air Force, the Indian Navy sent INS Chakra along with INS Kalvari to search for the Pakistani submarine PNS Saad which was believed to be deployed to sea.
