= Charkha =

Charkha may refer to:

- Charkha (spinning wheel), a type of Indian spinning wheel
- Charkha (Dhari, Gujarat), a village in Gujarat, western India
- Charkha Audiobooks, an imprint of the publisher Karadi Tales

== See also ==
- Charka (disambiguation)
- Chakra (disambiguation)
- Chakram (disambiguation)
- Chakri (disambiguation)
