= Chakram (disambiguation) =

Chakram is a throwing weapon from the Indian subcontinent.

Chakram may also refer to:

- Chakram (2003 film), 2003 Indian film
- Chakram (2005 film), 2005 Indian film
- Travancore chakram, an obsolete coin of India

== See also ==
- Chakra (disambiguation)
- Chakri (disambiguation)
- Charkha (disambiguation)
- Chakradhari (disambiguation)
- Chakkaram, a 1968 Indian Tamil-language film by A. Kasilingam
- Chakkaramuthu, an Indian Tamil-language romantic film
