= Chakravakam =

Chakravakam may refer to:

- A kind of bird called ruddy goose or Brahmany duck
- Chakravakam (raga), a raga (musical scale) of South Indian classical music
- Chakravakam (1974 Telugu film), a 1974 Indian Telugu-language film based on the novel Chakravakam by Koduri Kausalya Devi
- Chakravakam (1974 Malayalam film), a 1974 Indian Malayalam-language film directed by Thoppil Bhasi
- Chakravakam (TV series), an India Telugu-language soap opera

== See also ==
- Chakra (disambiguation)
