= Param Vir Chakra (disambiguation) =

Param Vir Chakra (PVC) is India 's highest military decoration

Param Vir Chakra may also refer to:

- Param Vir Chakra (film), a 1995 Bollywood war action film
- Parama Veera Chakra, a 2011 Telugu film
- Param Vir Chakra (TV series), a 1988 Indian TV series about Param Vir Chakra winners

== See also ==
- Param (disambiguation)
- Vir (disambiguation)
- Chakra (disambiguation)
- PVC (disambiguation)
- Vir Chakra, an Indian wartime military bravery award
- Param Vir, Indian-born British composer
- Parama Veera Chakra, a 2011 Indian Telugu film by Dasari Narayana Rao
