= List of submarine and submersible incidents since 2000 =

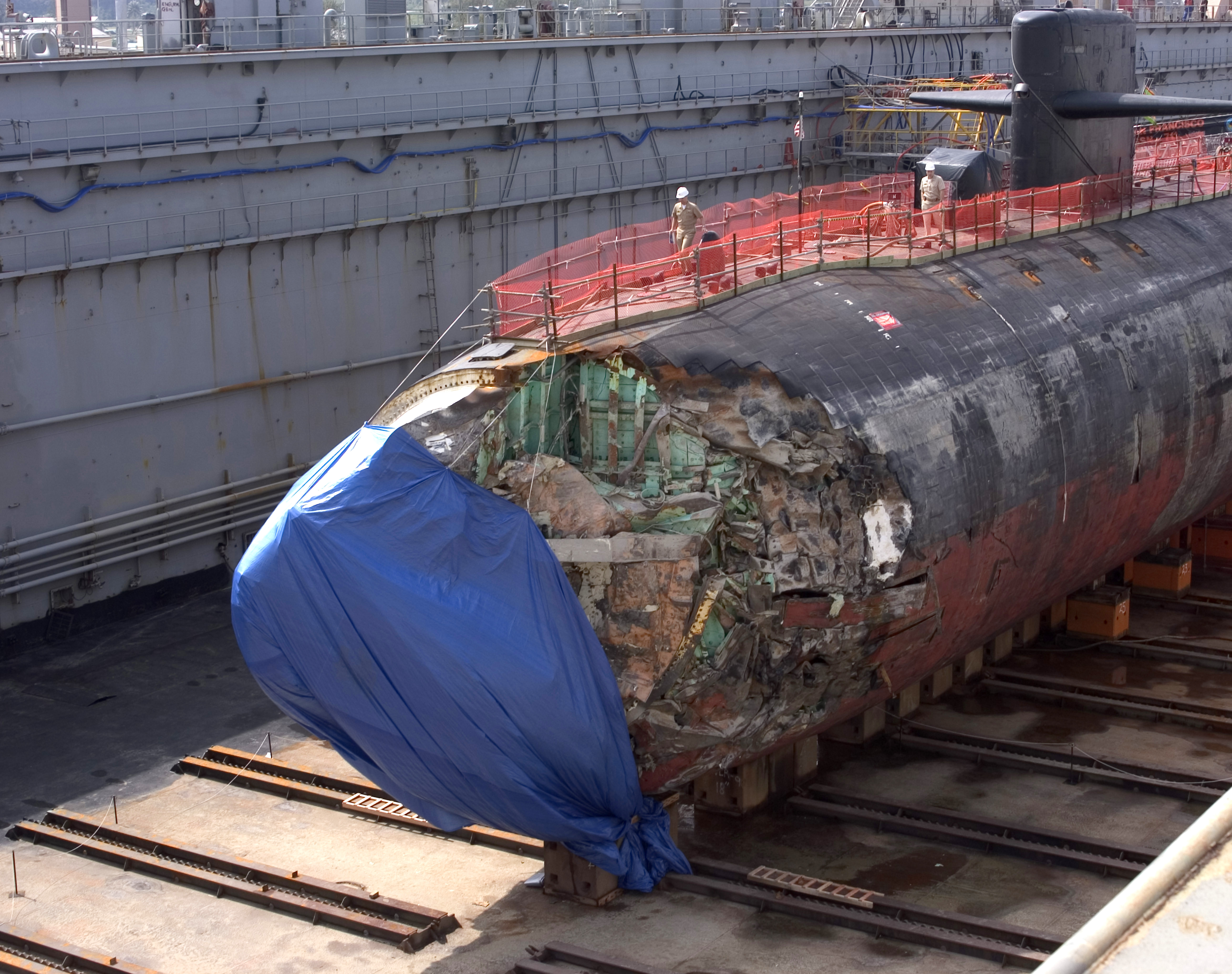
USS San Francisco in a dry dock, after hitting an underwater mountain 350 miles (560 km) south of Guam in 2005

This article describes major accidents and incidents involving submarines and submersibles since 2000.

== 2000s ==
=== 2000 ===
==== Kursk explosion ====
In August 2000, the Russian Oscar II-class submarine Kursk sank in the Barents Sea when a leak of high-test peroxide in the forward torpedo room led to the detonation of a torpedo warhead, which in turn triggered the explosion of around half a dozen other warheads about two minutes later. This second explosion was equivalent to about 3–7 tons of TNT and was large enough to register on seismographs across Northern Europe. The explosion and the flooding by high pressure seawater killed the majority of the submarine's 118 sailors. Twenty-three survived in the stern of the submarine, but despite an international rescue effort, they died several days later either from a flash fire or suffocation due to a lack of oxygen. The Russian Navy was severely criticised in its home country by family members of the deceased crew for failure to accept international help promptly.

=== 2001 ===
==== Ehime Maru and USS Greeneville collision ====
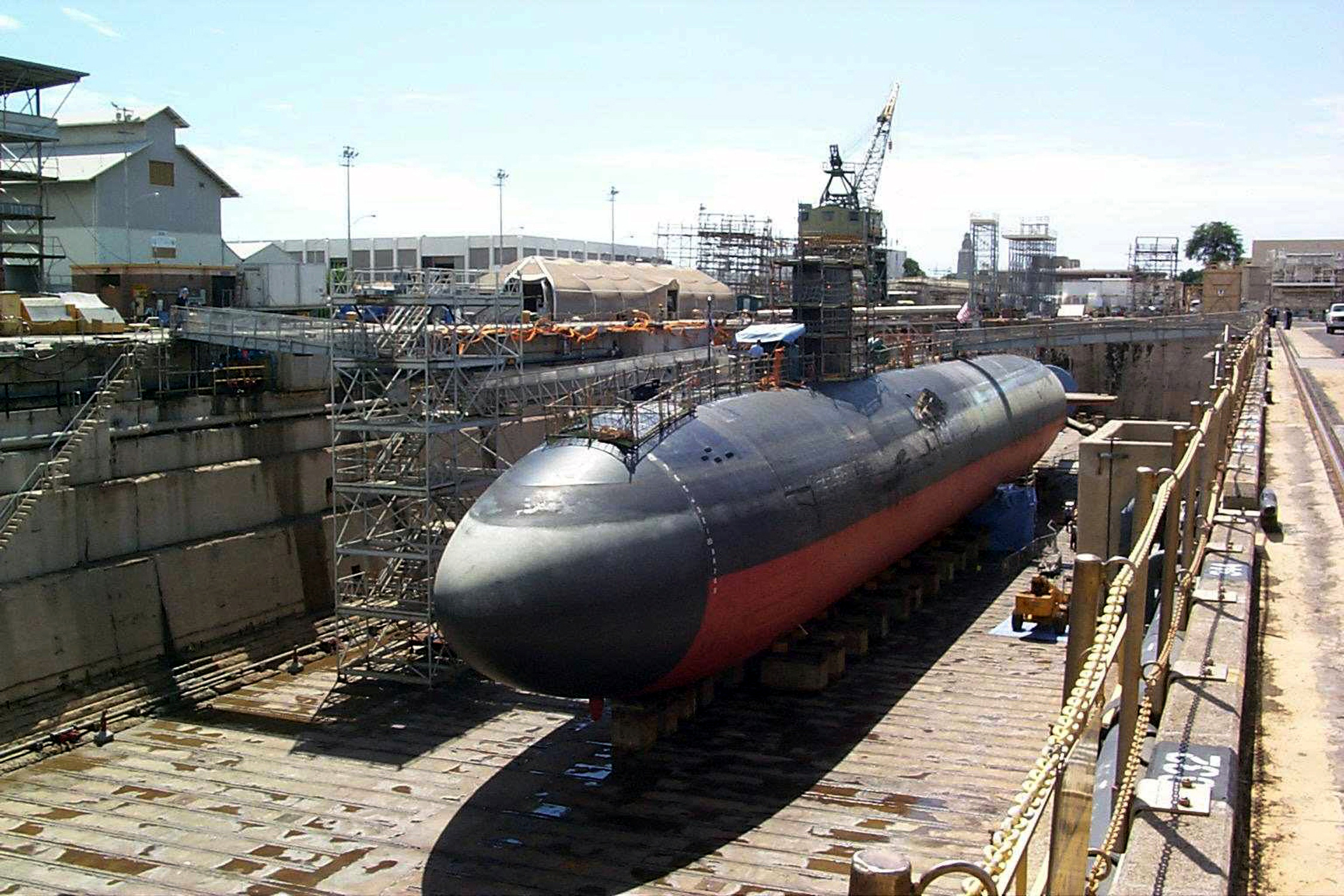
Greeneville in drydock at Pearl Harbor on 21 February 2001 after hitting and sinking Ehime Maru.

On 9 February 2001, the American submarine USS Greeneville accidentally struck and sank a Japanese high-school fisheries training ship, Ehime Maru, killing nine of the thirty-five people aboard, including four students, 10 miles (16 km) off the coast of Oahu. The collision occurred while members of the public were on board the submarine observing an emergency surface drill.

A naval inquiry found that the accident was the result of poorly executed sonar sweeps, an ineffective periscope search by the submarine's captain, Commander Scott Waddle, bad communication among the crew and distractions caused by the presence of the 16 civilian guests aboard the submarine.

The Navy and the command of Greeneville have been criticized for making no immediate attempt to help the Japanese on Ehime Maru that survived the initial collision. Weather conditions were producing 8-to-12-foot (2.4 to 3.7 m) waves and the submarine's partially surfaced condition prevented the opening of deck hatches. These were cited as reasons for the submarine captain's choosing to stand off and remain close by. While the U.S. Coast Guard directly responded, survivors resorted to automatically deployed life rafts from Ehime Maru.

=== 2002 ===
==== USS Dolphin major flooding and fire ====
In May 2002, the U.S. Navy research submarine USS Dolphin experienced severe flooding and fires off the coast of San Diego, California. The ship was abandoned by the crew and Navy civilian personnel, who were rescued by nearby naval vessels. No one was seriously injured. Although severely damaged, the boat was towed back to San Diego for overhaul.

==== USS Oklahoma City collision with tanker ====
On 13 November 2002, USS Oklahoma City collided with the Leif Hoegh liquefied natural gas tanker Norman Lady, east of the Strait of Gibraltar. No one on either vessel was hurt, and there were no leaks from fuel tanks and no threat to the environment, but the submarine sustained damage to her periscope and sail area, and put into La Maddalena, Sardinia, for repairs. Her commanding officer, Commander Richard Voter, was relieved of his command on 30 November. One other officer and two enlisted crew members were also disciplined for dereliction of duty.

==== HMS Trafalgar ====
In November 2002, the Royal Navy's Trafalgar-class submarine, HMS Trafalgar, ran aground close to Skye, causing £5 million worth of damage to her hull and injuring three sailors. It was travelling 50 metres (160 ft) below the surface at more than 14 knots (26 km/h) when Lieutenant-Commander Tim Green, a student in the Submarine Command Course, ordered a course change that took her onto the rocks at Fladda-chùain, a small but well-charted islet.

A report issued in May 2008 stated that tracing paper (used to protect navigational charts) had obscured vital data during a training exercise. Furthermore, the officer in charge of the training exercise had not been tracking the submarine's position using all the available equipment. Commanders Robert Fancy and Ian McGhie were court martialled and reprimanded over the incident.

=== 2003 ===
==== HMAS Dechaineux flooding ====
On 12 February 2003, HMAS Dechaineux, a Collins-class submarine of the Royal Australian Navy (RAN) was operating near her maximum safe diving depth off the coast of Western Australia when a seawater pipe burst. The high-pressure seawater flooded the lower engine room before the hose was sealed off. It was estimated that if the inflow had continued for another twenty seconds, the weight of the water would have prevented Dechaineux from returning to the surface. The Navy recalled all of the Collins-class submarines to the submarine base HMAS Stirling after this potentially catastrophic event, and after naval engineers were unable to find any flaws in the pipes that could have caused the burst, they commanded that the maximum safe depth of these submarines be reduced.

==== Great Wall 361 accident ====
In May 2003, China announced that the entire ship's crew (70 people) had been killed aboard the Ming-class Great Wall submarine 361 due to a mechanical malfunction. The accident took place off the coast of Liaoning province in northeast China. The vessel was recovered and towed to an unidentified port, where the cause of the accident was identified. When the battery was running low, the submarine surfaced with a vent opening for oxygen, which was consumed heavily by the charging diesel engines. At the same time, a sea wave surged, and seawater started to flow into the opening vent that automatically closed to prevent flooding. There was no single device on the submarine to detect low oxygen level and the crew suffocated due to the diesel engines consuming all the oxygen present within the submarine. As a consequence, the Commander and the Political Commissar of the People's Liberation Army Navy were dismissed from service, as well as the Commander, Political Commissar and Chief of Staff of the Northern Fleet.

==== K-159 sinking ====
In August 2003, the Russian November-class submarine K-159 sank in the Barents Sea. This submarine had been decommissioned, and she was being towed away for scrapping. Of her skeleton crew of ten sailors, nine were killed.

==== USS Hartford grounding ====
On 25 October 2003, the American Los Angeles-class submarine USS Hartford ran aground in the harbor of La Maddalena, Sardinia, in the Mediterranean Sea. This grounding caused about nine million dollars' worth of damage to Hartford.

=== 2004 ===
==== HMCS Chicoutimi fire ====
On 5 October 2004, the Canadian submarine HMCS Chicoutimi suffered from two fires after leaving Faslane harbour for Halifax harbour. One officer, Canadian Forces Lieutenant(N) Chris Saunders, died the following day while he was being flown via helicopter to a hospital in Ireland. Canadian Forces investigators concluded that poor insulation of some power cables caused the fires. The following board of inquiry found that the fire was caused by a series of events that caused electrical arcing at cable joints from seawater penetration at the joints.

=== 2005 ===
==== USS San Francisco collision with undersea terrain ====
On 8 January 2005, the Los Angeles-class submarine USS San Francisco, while underway and submerged, collided with a seamount about 350 miles (560 km) south of Guam in the Marianas Islands. One of her sailors, Machinist mate 2nd Class (MM2(SS)) Joseph Allen Ashley, of Akron, Ohio, died from the injuries he suffered in the collision. This happened while San Francisco was on a high-speed voyage to visit Brisbane, Australia.

An additional 97 sailors were injured in this accident, including two with dislocated shoulders. The collision with the seamount was so severe that San Francisco nearly sank. Accounts from the scene related a desperate struggle for positive buoyancy after her forward ballast tanks had been ruptured. Several news web sites stated that the boat had hit an "uncharted seamount" at a high speed. Commander Kevin Mooney was relieved of command of the San Francisco after an investigation revealed that he had been using inadequate methods of ocean voyage planning.

San Francisco underwent a rapid deceleration from more than 25 knots (46 km/h) to a standstill, causing a section of her bow to collapse (including her sonar system along with the forward ballast tanks) and everything not tied down to fly forward in the boat. San Francisco returned to her base at Guam, where emergency repairs were carried out. Next, she steamed to the Puget Sound Naval Shipyard for more permanent repairs. The bow section of San Francisco was replaced with that of a sister ship, USS Honolulu, which had already been removed from service because of years of wear and tear. This replacement of the bow of San Francisco was successful, and the vessel returned to active service in the Pacific Fleet, based at San Diego.

==== AS-28 emergency ====
On 5 August 2005, the Russian Priz-class deep-submergence rescue vehicle AS-28, while operating off the coast of the Kamchatka Peninsula, became entangled in a fishing net, or possibly by cables belonging to an underwater antenna assembly, at a depth of 190 metres (620 feet). Unable to free itself, the submarine was stuck with a depleting air supply.

After a multi-national effort, a British Royal Navy team using a Scorpio ROV was able to free the submarine from the entanglement, allowing it to return to the surface. All seven crew members were rescued safely.

==== USS Philadelphia collision with MV Yasa Aysen ====
On 5 September 2005, USS Philadelphia was in the Persian Gulf about 30 nautical miles (60 km) northeast of Bahrain when she collided with the Turkish merchant ship MV Yasa Aysen. No injuries were reported on either vessel. The damage to the submarine was described as "superficial." The Turkish ship suffered minor damage to its hull just above her waterline, but the United States Coast Guard inspected the ship and found her to be still seaworthy. The commanding officer of Philadelphia, Commander Steven M. Oxholm, was relieved of his command following this collision.

=== 2006 ===
==== Daniil Moskovsky fire ====
On 6 September 2006, the Russian Victor III-class submarine Daniil Moskovsky suffered a fire which resulted in the deaths of two crewmen (a warrant officer and a sailor). At the time of the incident the submarine was anchored off the Rybachiy peninsula, on Russia's north coast near the border with Norway. The fire was extinguished with no damage to the reactor (which had been scrammed as a precaution), and the submarine was towed to a base at Vidyayevo. The incident was reported as being caused by an electrical fire in the vessel's wiring.

==== USS Minneapolis-Saint Paul incident ====
Four crew members were washed overboard from USS Minneapolis-Saint Paul by heavy waves on 29 December 2006 in Plymouth Sound, England. This resulted in the deaths of Senior Chief Thomas Higgins (chief of the boat) and Sonar Technician 2nd Class Michael Holtz. After the preliminary investigation, Commander Edwin Ruff received a punitive letter of reprimand, stating that the accident was avoidable, and he was reassigned to a shore-based post in Norfolk, Virginia.

=== 2007 ===
==== USS Newport News collision with Japanese tanker Mogamigawa ====
On 8 January 2007, USS Newport News was transiting submerged in the Strait of Hormuz when she hit the Japanese tanker Mogamigawa. She had been operating as part of Carrier Strike Group 8 (CSG-8), organised around the aircraft carrier USS Dwight D. Eisenhower and dispatched to the Indian Ocean to help support operations in Somalia.

==== HMS Tireless ====
On 21 March 2007, two crew members of the Royal Navy's Trafalgar-class submarine, HMS Tireless were killed in an explosion caused by air-purification equipment in the forward section of the submarine. The submarine was in service in the Arctic Ocean and had to make an emergency surface through the pack ice. A third crewmember who suffered "non-life-threatening" injuries was airlifted to a military hospital at Elmendorf Air Force Base near Anchorage, Alaska. According to the Royal Navy, the accident did not affect the ship's nuclear reactor, and the ship sustained only superficial damage.

=== 2008 ===
==== HMS Superb collision ====
On 26 May 2008, the Royal Navy's Swiftsure-class submarine, HMS Superb hit an underwater rock pinnacle in the northern Red Sea, 80 miles (130 km) south of Suez, causing damage to sonar equipment. The submarine was decommissioned slightly earlier than planned as a result of the damage.

==== Russian K-152 Nerpa gas leak ====
On 8 November 2008, at least 20 men died of asphyxiation from a gas leak on board the Russian nuclear submarine K-152 Nerpa, during trials in the Sea of Japan. The submarine was leased to the Indian Navy in 2011 and was formally commissioned into service as INS Chakra in 2012.

=== 2009 ===
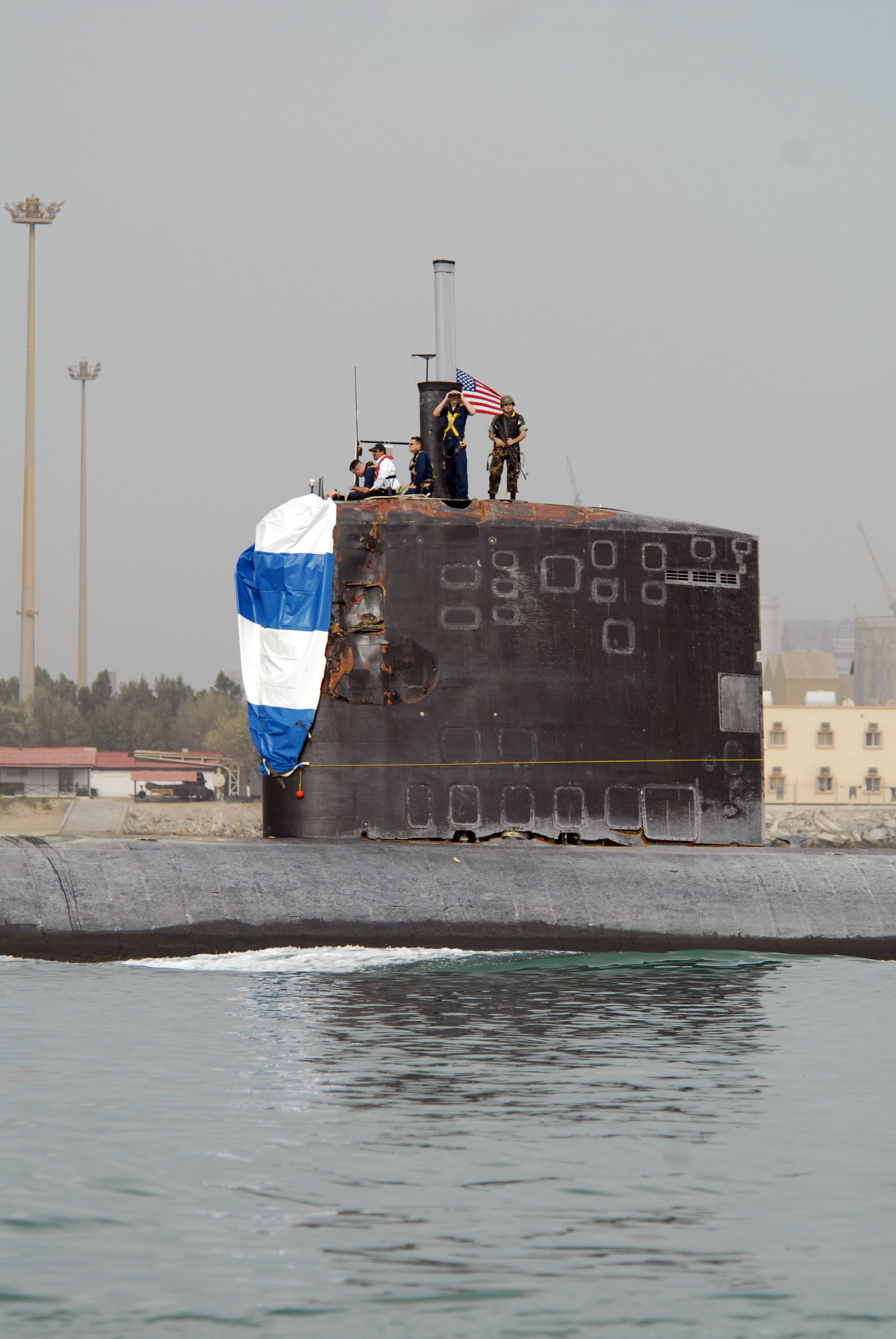
USS Hartford in Bahrain a day after the collision

==== HMS Vanguard and Triomphant collision ====
Two nuclear submarines, the Royal Navy's HMS Vanguard and the French Navy's Triomphant, collided in February 2009. They were operating in the Atlantic Ocean at the time. No injuries or radiation leaks were reported.

==== USS Hartford and USS New Orleans collision ====
USS Hartford collided with USS New Orleans on 20 March 2009 in the Strait of Hormuz.

== 2010s ==
=== 2010 ===
==== HMS Astute grounding ====
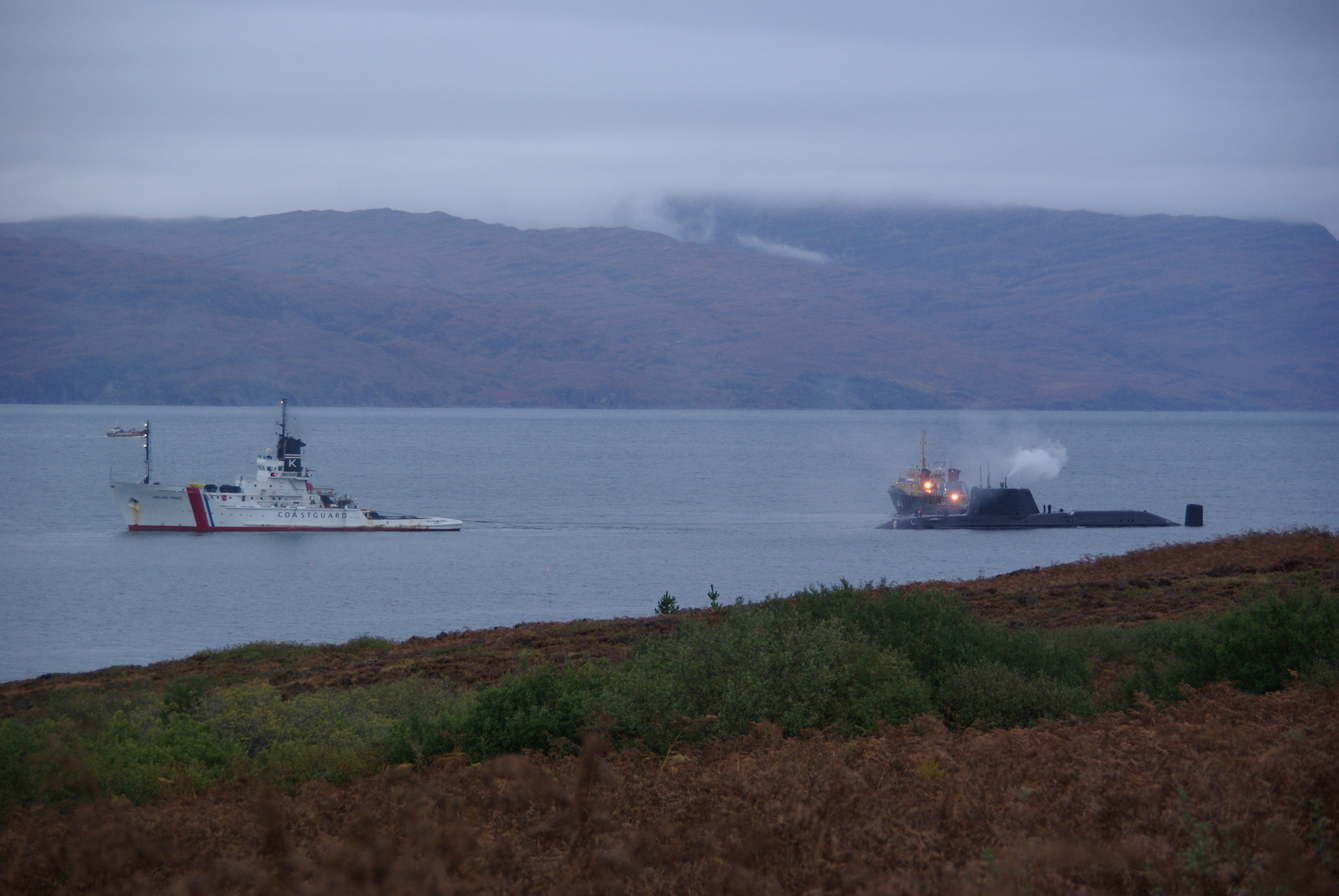
Astute aground with the emergency tow vessel Anglian Prince

On 22 October 2010, HMS Astute ran aground on a sand bank off the coast of the Isle of Skye in Scotland. Commanding officer Andy Coles was relieved of his post after an inquiry concluded a series of errors led to the incident. At least two other unnamed officers received disciplinary action.

=== 2011 ===
==== HMCS Corner Brook grounding ====
HMCS Corner Brook ran aground in Nootka Sound off the coast of Vancouver Island on 4 June 2011, while conducting SOTC (Submarine Officer Training Course). Minor injuries were sustained by two crew members and the submarine returned to CFB Esquimalt after the incident without escort or further incident. A board of inquiry into the incident deemed commanding officer, Lieutenant-Commander Paul Sutherland, had responsibility for safe navigation of the submarine and was relieved of his command.

=== 2012 ===
==== USS Miami arson ====
On 23 May 2012, during a scheduled maintenance overhaul, USS Miami suffered extensive damage from a fire, which was later determined to have been part of a series of fires started deliberately by a civilian shipyard worker, Casey Fury, who was seeking time off from work. The Navy determined it would be uneconomical to repair the submarine and decided to decommission and scrap her instead. Fury was sentenced to 17 years in prison.

==== USS Montpelier collision with USS San Jacinto ====
USS Montpelier and the Aegis cruiser USS San Jacinto collided off the coast of north-eastern Florida on 13 October 2012 during an exercise while the submarine was submerged at periscope depth. There were no injuries aboard either ship. The initial assessment of damage was that there was a complete depressurisation of the sonar dome aboard San Jacinto. The investigation revealed that the principal cause of the collision was human error, poor teamwork by Montpelier watch team, and the commanding officer's failure to follow established procedures for submarines operating at periscope depth. Additionally, the investigation revealed contributing factors threaded among the various command and control headquarters that provide training and operational oversight within Fleet Forces Command.

=== 2013 ===
==== INS Sindhurakshak explosion and sinking ====
On 14 August 2013, the Indian Navy's INS Sindhurakshak Kilo-class Type 877EKM submarine sank after explosions caused by a fire took place on board when the submarine was berthed at Mumbai. The fire, followed by a series of ordnance blasts on the armed submarine, occurred shortly after midnight. The fire was put out within two hours. Due to damage from the explosions, the submarine sank at its berth with only a portion visible above the water surface. Sailors on board reportedly jumped off to safety. The vessel was salvaged later and 18 dead bodies were recovered.

Due to the explosion, the front section of the submarine was twisted, bent and crumpled, and water had entered the forward compartment. Another submarine, INS Sindhuratna, also sustained minor damage when the fire on Sindhurakshak caused its torpedoes to explode. An enquiry into the incident found the cause of the incident to be violation of Standard Operating Procedures during torpedo loading. This resulted in the explosion of two torpedoes during the incident while the remaining 14 torpedoes disintegrated.

The navy was hopeful of using Sindhurakshak after it was salvaged, but on Navy Day 2015, Vice Admiral Cheema confirmed the Sindhurakshak would be disposed of. After a period of use for the training of marine commandos, the submarine was sunk in 3000 metres of water in the Arabian Sea during June 2017.

==== Russian K-150 Tomsk fire ====
On 16 September 2013, fifteen seamen were hospitalised after a fire on the Oscar-class submarine. The fire started during welding activity, as the sub was being repaired at the Zvezda shipyard near Vladivostok on the Sea of Japan. The fire was put out after five hours. A federal Investigative Committee said the fire had "caused damage to the health of 15 servicemen" and they remained in hospital. It gave no details about their condition.

==== USS Jacksonville collision ====
On 10 January 2013, USS Jacksonville struck a suspected fishing trawler in the Persian Gulf and bent one of its periscopes. The ship's commanding and executive officers were relieved for cause following the incident.

=== 2015 ===
==== HMS Talent collision ====
In early 2015, Trafalgar-class submarine HMS Talent entered Devonport Naval base in Plymouth with significant damage to its sail after striking ice.

==== Karen collision ====
On April 15, 2015, a Royal Navy submarine transiting through the Irish Sea snagged the fishing gear of the stern trawler Karen. The submarine crew had misidentified the sonar contact as a merchant vessel rather than a small fishing vessel, causing them to overestimate the distance to it. The trawler was dragged backwards and partially submerged. Fortunately the fishing gear came loose and the trawler survived with some material damage, but the situation was very dangerous and recalls the FV Antares which sank under similar circumstances in 1990.

=== 2016 ===
==== Sinking of unknown North Korean submarine ====
On 11 March 2016, CNN and the U.S. Naval Institute News reported that unnamed US officials believed a North Korean submarine had been lost at sea in the Sea of Japan. According to reports, the U.S. military had been observing the submarine when it "stopped" before the Korean People's Navy was observed searching the area by American satellites, aircraft and ships.

==== HMS Ambush collision ====
On 20 July 2016, while operating at periscope depth on a training exercise in the Strait of Gibraltar, HMS Ambush collided with a merchant ship, sustaining significant damage to the top of her conning tower. The merchant vessel did not sustain any damage. It was reported that no crew members were injured during the collision and that the submarine's nuclear reactor section remained completely undamaged.

=== 2017 ===
==== UC3 Nautilus sinking ====
On 11 August 2017, the privately owned submarine UC3 Nautilus sank off the coast of Denmark. Danish authorities believe its owner Peter Madsen scuttled the submarine to hide evidence in the murder of journalist Kim Wall. In October 2017, Madsen admitted to dismembering Wall during their submarine trip and was later convicted of her murder.

==== ARA San Juan ====
On the night of 16 November 2017, the Argentine Navy submarine ARA San Juan and her crew of 44 was reported missing in the San Jorge Gulf region. Ships and long-range patrol aircraft from several nations, including Argentina, Brazil, Chile, Uruguay, Russia, the United Kingdom and the United States, were dispatched in a search and rescue mission. Rescue submersibles and parachute rescuers were deployed. On 30 November, hopes of rescuing the crew alive were abandoned.

On 16 November 2018, the company Ocean Infinity had located San Juan through a remote submersible. The wreck was 460 kilometres (290 miles) southeast of Comodoro Rivadavia at a depth of 907 metres (2,976 feet). The submarine's imploded wreckage was strewn up to 70 metres (230 feet) from the hull. All 44 crew members were lost with the submarine.

==== Alleged INS Arihant flood ====
In January 2018, the Indian Navy nuclear submarine INS Arihant was alleged to have flooded alongside some time in 2017, due to an aft hatch being left open by mistake, causing damage to its propulsion compartment. Claims state that the submarine was out of action for 10 months while repairs to pipework were carried out. Some sources disputed this claim, alleging that the submarine did not have any aft hatches, and some claimed the submarine's doubled hulled design made this impossible. The Indian Ministry for Defence refused to deny the allegations, saying it would be a breach of national security to discuss the matter.

=== 2019 ===
==== Losharik fire ====
On 1 July 2019, a fire on what it described as a Russian deep-water research submarine surveying the seabed near the Arctic killed 14 sailors. Russian officials faced accusations of trying to cover up the full details of the accident, and some Russian media criticised what they said was a lack of transparency, and drew parallels with the lack of official information during the meltdown of a Soviet nuclear reactor in Chernobyl in 1986. The next day, the Russian government officially disclosed the incident on the submarine Losharik and acknowledged that the vessel had a nuclear reactor on board.

== 2020s ==
=== 2020 ===
==== Hoegh London collision with South Korean Navy submarine ====
On 15 July 2020, 05:00 UTC, Norwegian merchant ship Hoegh London (IMO 9342205) and South Korean Navy's Jang Bogo-class submarine collided near Gadeokdo island, Busan, South Korea. No casualties were reported.

=== 2021 ===
==== KRI Nanggala (402) sinking ====
On 21 April 2021, Indonesian Navy spokesperson First Admiral Julius Widjojono announced that KRI Nanggala had failed to report for a post-maneuver brief following a torpedo live fire exercise in the Bali Sea off the coast of Surabaya, about 95 km (51 nautical miles) north of Bali, in an area where the water is 700 metres (2,300 ft) deep. The submarine was declared sunk on 24 April, 18:00 (GMT+7) by Commander of the Indonesian National Armed Forces Hadi Tjahjanto at a depth of 700–800 metres below sea level.

At a press conference held on 25 April, the 53 crew were confirmed lost after the submarine was found at a depth of 839 metres (2,753 feet) below sea level by Indonesian navy ship KRI Rigel, broken up into three parts. The Singapore Navy RSSV ship MV Swift Rescue's ROV took the submarine's first image.

==== USS Connecticut (SSN-22) collision with seamount ====
On 2 October 2021, USS Connecticut (SSN-22) was severely damaged by a collision with a seamount in the South China Sea. About eleven sailors sustained injuries, though none were reported to be life-threatening. The submarine's propulsion system was said to be operating normally. After an investigation the commanding officer, executive officer, and chief of the boat were relieved of duty.

=== 2023 ===
==== Titan implosion ====
On 18 June 2023, the Titan, a private submersible operated by OceanGate, went missing in international waters in the North Atlantic Ocean off the coast of Newfoundland, Canada. The submersible was conducting a tourist expedition to view the wreck of the Titanic with five people on board, including the founder of OceanGate. Communication was lost with the submersible around 1 hour and 45 minutes into its dive to the wreck site; authorities were notified when it did not resurface at its scheduled time later that day. On 22 June, following the discovery of a debris field containing parts of the Titan approximately 488 m (1,600 ft) from the bow of the Titanic by a remotely operated underwater vehicle (ROUV), the loss of the sub and its crew were determined to be caused by an implosion of the pressure chamber during or after its descent, killing all onboard instantly.

==== Russian B-237 "Rostov-na-Donu" missile attack ====
On 13 September 2023, Russian Kilo-class submarine B-237 "Rostov-na-Donu" was struck by a missile during a missile attack in Crimea during the Russo-Ukrainian War, while docked at Sevastopol Shipyard in Crimea. The missile that struck the submarine is alleged to be either a Storm Shadow or SCALP. The air launched cruise missiles were possibly launched from a Ukrainian Sukhoi Su-24. Russia claimed that 10 missiles were fired, of which 3 managed to penetrate the dockyards defences, hitting both the submarine and the landing ship Minsk.

On 20 September, photos emerged that showed two large holes in the pressure hull. Ukraine and outside sources claimed that the two vessels were damaged beyond repair, while Russia's Defence Ministry claimed that both vessels would be repaired and returned to service. Casualties are unknown, although Ukrainian officials claimed 24 personnel were injured on the submarine and 62 killed aboard Minsk.

=== 2024 ===
==== Chinese Zhou-class nuclear submarine ====
US officials claimed that the first of a new series of nuclear submarines of the People's Liberation Army Navy (PLAN), a Zhou-class submarine, was sunk alongside a pier in Wuhan between March and June 2024 on 26 September 2024. PLAN and Chinese officials deny such event had occurred. The Chinese Embassy in Washington, D.C., denied knowledge of the incident. The Wuhan pier is not a current known nuclear-powered submarine construction base, as it has previously only been used for diesel-electric/conventionally powered submarines.

==== Russian B-237 "Rostov-na-Donu" alleged sinking ====
On 3 August 2024, Ukrainian officials claimed to have sunk the Russian Kilo-class submarine B-237 "Rostov-na-Donu" a day earlier. The submarine had been undergoing repairs at Sevastopol Shipyard in Crimea after being hit by a suspected Storm Shadow or SCALP missile in September 2023. There was no confirmation of the sinking, although a possible decoy was seen on satellite imagery, with what is believed to be the genuine submarine sunk and partially under a tarp nearby. The British Ministry of Defence claimed that it was "highly likely" the submarine had been sunk.

=== 2025 ===
==== 2025 Red Sea tourist submarine disaster ====
On March 27, 2025, a tourist submarine operated by Sindbad Submarines sank off the coast of Hurghada, Egypt, in the Red Sea, resulting in the deaths of six people and the rescue of 39 others. The incident raised concerns about safety standards in Egypt's tourist submarine industry.
