= Wir =

Wir, WIR or WiR may also refer to:

== Organisations ==
- WIR Bank, a complementary currency system in Switzerland
- Washington and Idaho Railway
- West India Regiments, a colonial regiment of the British Army
- Wolność i Równość, a Polish political party
- Workers International Relief, organization of famine relief and propaganda agencies established by the Comintern

== Arts and entertainment ==
- We (novel), a 1921 novel (Russian: Мы; German: Wir) by Yevgeny Zamyatin
- Wir (film), a 1982 German film adaptation of the novel We (Russian: Мы; German: Wir; English: We) by Yevgeny Zamyatin
- Wreck-It Ralph, a Disney movie

== Other uses ==
- Western Irian, Western New Guinea, obsolete UNDP country code
- Wikipedian in residence, a Wikipedia editor who accepts a placement with an institution
- Wir, Masovian Voivodeship, a village in Poland
- Wire (band), a British punk group that called itself Wir for one album
- Women in Red, a volunteer project which focuses on creating new Wikipedia articles about women
- Women in Refrigerators, a common comic book trope
- West Indian Reports, Caribbean law reports

== See also ==
- VIR (disambiguation)
