= Chakri =

Chakri may refer to:

== People ==
- Chakri (composer) (1974–2014), Tollywood music director
- Chakri Toleti, Indian American screenwriter, director, actor, and visual effects coordinator

== Other uses ==
- Chakri (noble title), a historical Thai noble title for the king's chief minister, from an epithet of the god Vishnu
- Chakri dynasty, the royal house of Thailand
- Gujarati name for murukku, an Indian snack
- Chakri or charkha, Indian name for the spinning wheel used for making khadi cloth
- A small chakram, a throwing weapon
- Chakri, Jhelum, a village in Jhelum District, Pakistan
- Chakri, an alternative name for the Indian snack Chakli

== See also ==
- Chakra (disambiguation)
- Chakram (disambiguation)
- Charkha (disambiguation)
