= Alonso de Mendoza =

Spanish conquistador

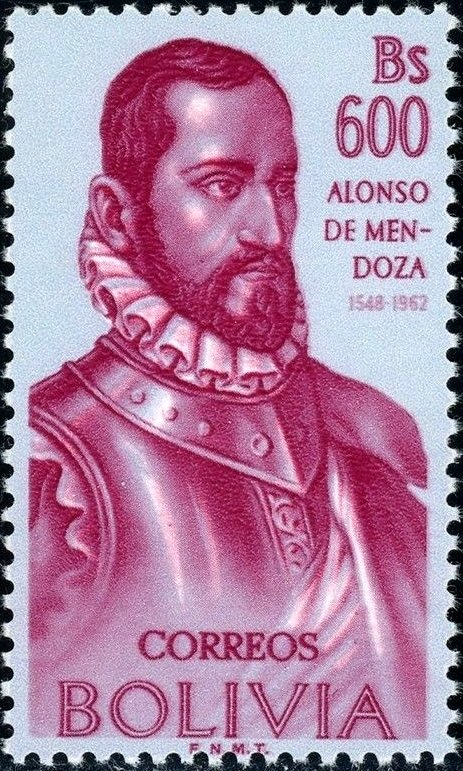
- Mendoza on a Bolivian stamp

Personal details
- Born: c. 1471 or 1476 Garrovillas de Alconétar, Spain
- Died: 26 June 1549 (age about 75) Tipuani, Bolivia

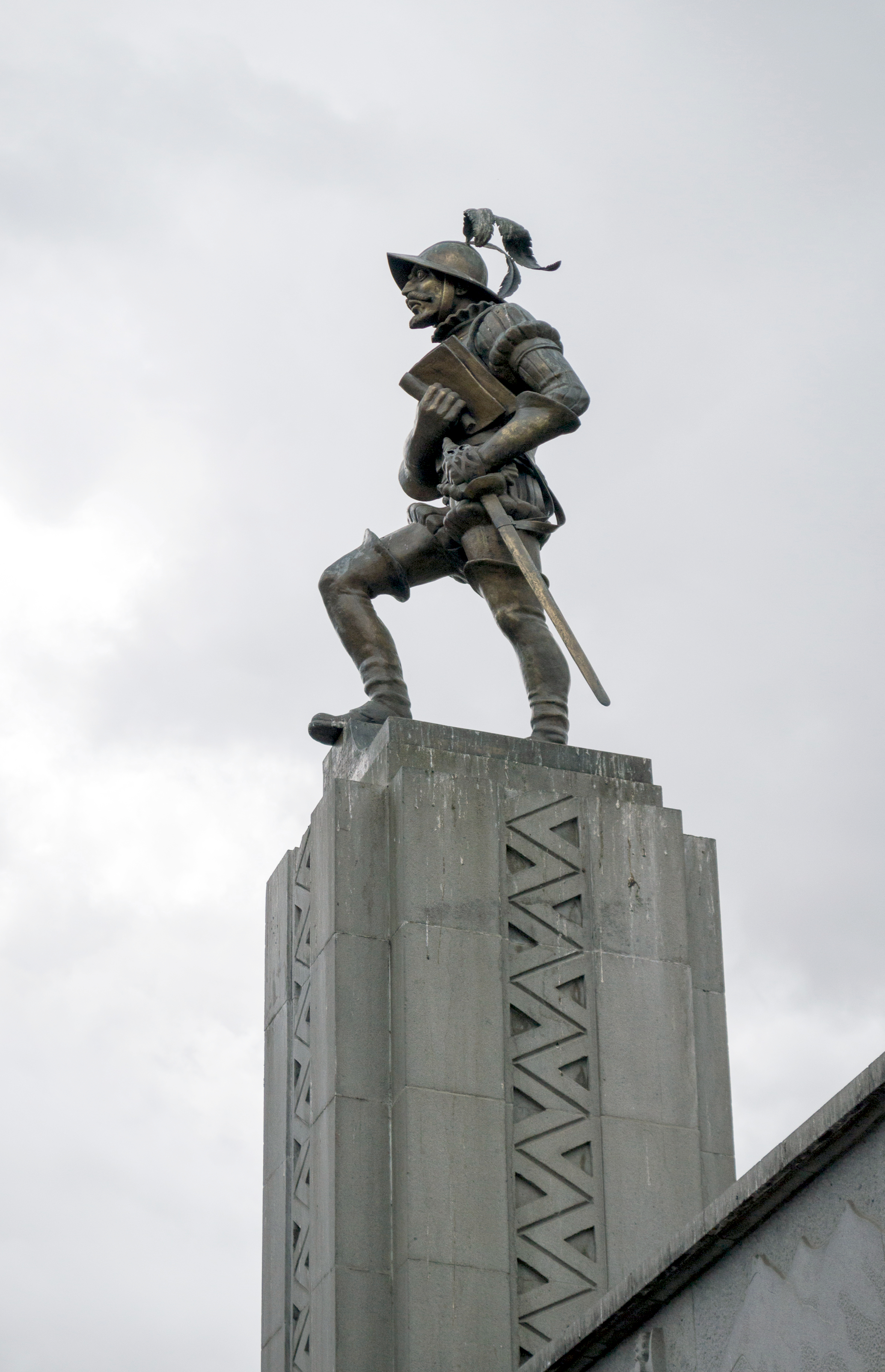
Statue of Mendoza in La Paz

Alonso de Mendoza (c. 1471/76 – 26 June 1549) was a Spanish captain, conquistador, and the founder of the city of Nuestra Señora de La Paz. He was appointed by Pedro de la Gasca, the "Peacemaker," to found the city to commemorate the peace in the Peruvian colonies after the defeat of the Pizarro brothers.

== Early life ==
Alonso de Mendoza was born between 1471 and 1476 in Garrovillas de Alconétar, Spain. He left the peninsula attracted by the news about the wealth of the New World, and by the Adventures of Pizarro and Almagro, who had conquered the Inca Empire.

== New World ==
Alonso de Mendoza fought as a soldier in Germany and Italy before moving to the New World. It is believed that he settled in Cuba when Diego Velázquez de Cuéllar was the governor, as the name of one Alonso de Mendoza appears in a document signed in Guanuco and dated 1520. Then he appears in Mexico serving under Hernán Cortés, and in San Sebastián del Puerto, from where he was later banished, accused of being an agitator.

== Peru ==
Later Alonso de Mendoza moved to Peru, where his natural intelligence, people skills, and personal charm opened the doors of the headquarters of Pizarro, then at war with his partner Diego de Almagro. He fought in the battle of Las Salinas, against Almagro himself, and in the battle of Chupas, where "Diego, the Younger" died in action. After these actions, he was appointed governor of Chuquisaca. During the turbulent years of Gonzalo Pizarro's rebellion against king Charles V of Spain, he seems to have acted on both sides. By the end of the rebellion he was serving under Francisco de Carvajal, the "Demon of the Andes", who made him Captain and gave him different missions in a long campaign against the royalist Diego de Centeno.

Mendoza's life took another dramatic turn when he decided to serve under the orders of Pedro de la Gasca, the envoy of the King, who entrusted him with a group of chivalry in the battle of Sacsahuaman. Pedro de la Gasca, whose mission had ended in Peru with the resolution of the conflict, had decided to leave Peru, but he wanted to leave a legacy. On 7 April 1548 de la Gasca notified Captain Mendoza that he was appointed to found a new city to commemorate the victory of the royal forces and the peace. By the time, too, he had taken possession of productive gold mines in the region of Tipuani.

== Foundation of La Paz ==
Three priests (Francisco Morales, Francisco Laroca and Francisco Alcócer) suggested Mendoza the location of the new city. Many members of the staff of the Viceroyalty of Peru, many commissioners and soldiers, priests and traders were familiar with a valley known as Chukiyawu, next to the Illimani mountain, and knew that there was a small Indian village. They had admired the beauty of the depression, a gigantic, rugged and irregular basin, with a river on the bottom. The river was called by the natives Chukiyapu or Choqueyapu (Golden River).

Mendoza prepared the documents for the foundation to take place on 20 October 1548, but the authorities could not arrive in time, so the captain proceeded to a provisional act of foundation in the site of the Indian village of Laja or Laxa, in the Andean plains. Three days later, the official ceremony was held in the actual location. Morales, Laroca and Alcócer provided the general design for the city.

Nuestra Señora de La Paz became part of the route that connected Lima to Potosí, the city built around the richest silver mine in the world. It was also part of the route to the goldfields of Tipuani, and the subtropical zone of Yungas. The site was well chosen, not only because it offered many advantages but also because it offered a good place for "Pascana" (rest and comfort) for travelers.

== Death ==
In 1549 Alonso de Mendoza was commissioned to fight an Indian uprising in Potosí. It is unclear if he returned to Chuquisaca before his death in Tipuani.

== Popular culture ==
– A commemorative statue in honor of Alonso de Mendoza can be seen in La Paz, in the site where he founded the city, known then by the natives as Churupampa (Field of Shells). Part of downtown La Paz, its current name is Plaza Alonso de Mendoza.

– In La Garrovilla (Badajoz), the main plaza is called Alonso de Mendoza.

– The town of Garrovillas (Cáceres) has named a street "Capitán Mendoza" after him.

– In 2003, a Metro station (Line 12) in Madrid, Spain, was named after Captain Alonso de Mendoza.
