= Kalabuda =

- Village
- Location in Odisha
- Coordinates: 20°23′56.64″N 86°21′5.15″E
- Country: India
- State: Odisha
- District: Kendrapara
- Language: Odia
- Seat: Patakura

Area
  - Total: 3 km^{2} (1.2 sq mi)

Population (2010)
  - Total: 1,200
- Time zone: IST (+5.30)
- postal code: 754153
- phone: 06727
- Vehicle registration: OD 29

Kalabuda is a village in Garadpur block, Kendrapara, Odisha, India, near the eastern coast.

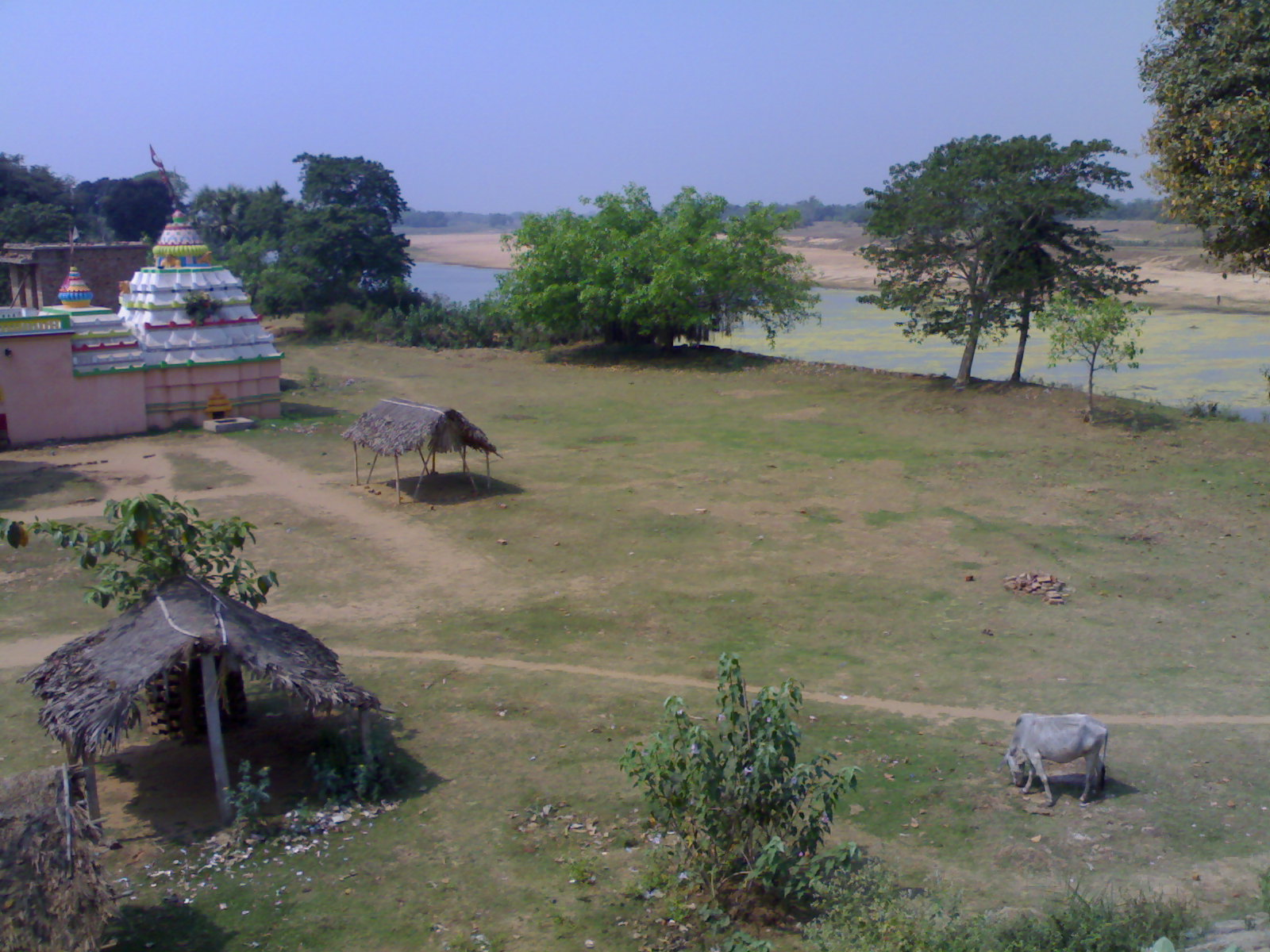
Kalabuda

== Location ==
Kalabuda is situated about 65 kilometres (40 mi) from Cuttack and 12 km (7 mi) from Kendrapara town, on the bank of Chitroptala river. The Kalabuda (A), Kalabuda (B) and Kalabuda (C) wards are under this village.

== History ==
"Kalabuda" literally means "art hub" from "kala" (art) and "buda" (hub) in Oriya language). It refers to the prevalence of local artisans.

== Facilities ==
Kalabuda hosts a primary school and a high school. The village offers a medical facility, post office, fax facility, and Internet facility. The bridge in the village connecting Korua and Kalabuda is the main communication path in this area.

== Notable residents ==
- Chakradhar Satapathy (former MLA, Patakura)
