= Vir pri Nevljah =

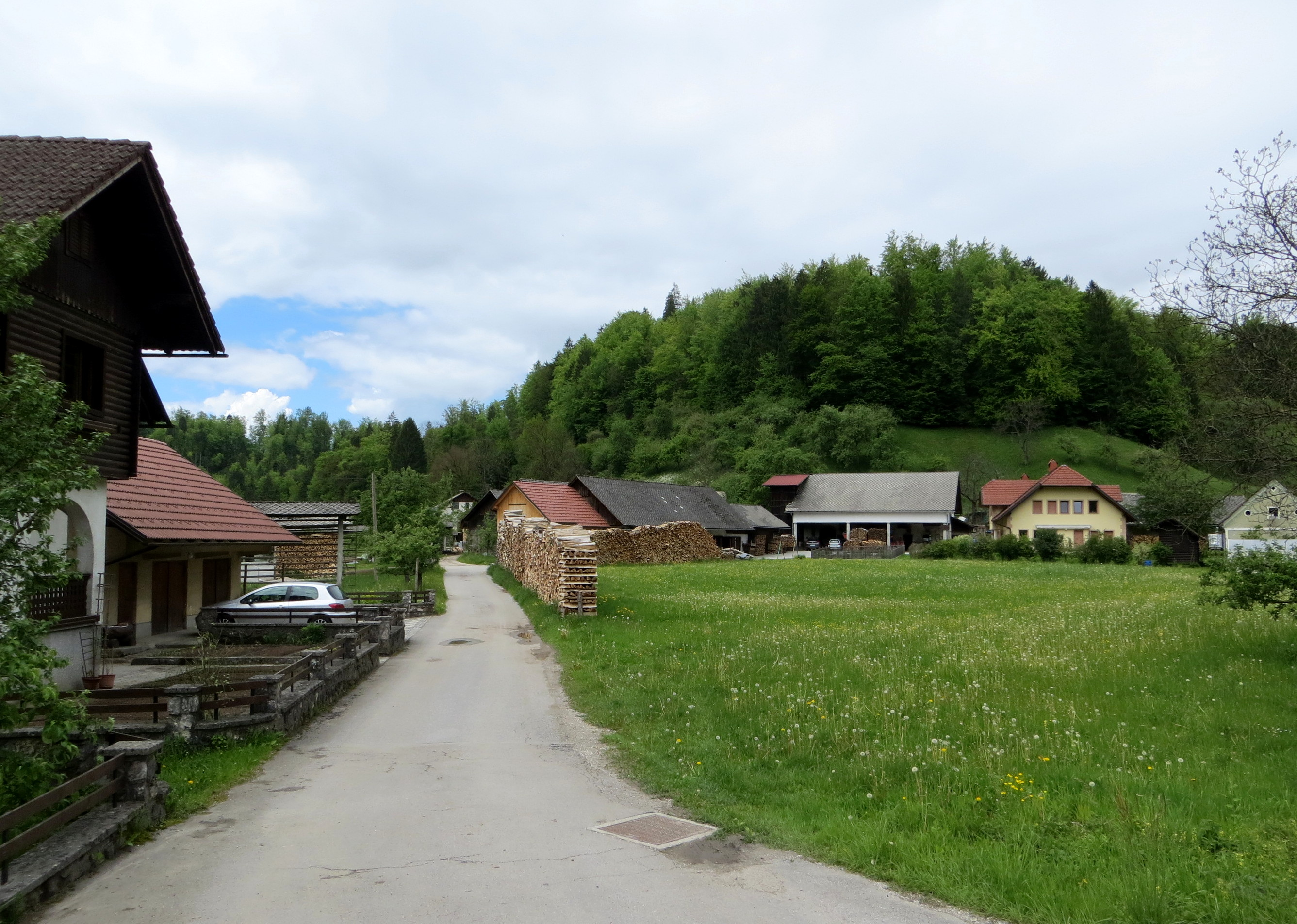

- Location in Slovenia
- Coordinates: 46°13′40.99″N 14°39′57.3″E
- Country: Slovenia
- Traditional region: Upper Carniola
- Statistical region: Central Slovenia
- Municipality: Kamnik

Area
  - Total: 0.74 km^{2} (0.29 sq mi)
- Elevation: 421.4 m (1,383 ft)

Population (2002)
  - Total: 18

Vir pri Nevljah (pronounced [ˈʋiːɾ pɾi ˈneːu̯ljax]) is a small settlement on the Nevljica River in the Municipality of Kamnik in the Upper Carniola region of Slovenia]. It has a few houses on the road through the Tuhinj Valley between the settlements of Podhruška and Soteska.

== Name ==
The name of the settlement was changed from Vir to Vir pri Nevljah in 1953.
