= Chakradhari =

Chakradhari may refer to:

- An epithet of the Hindu gods Vishnu and Krishna (the chakra holder (dhari))
- Chakradhari (1948 film), a 1948 Tamil film
- Chakradhari (1954 film), a 1954 Hindi film
- Chakradhari (1977 film), a 1977 Telugu film

== See also ==
- Chakradhar (disambiguation)
- Chakra (disambiguation)
- Chakram (disambiguation)
- Dhari (disambiguation)
