= Satya Narayana Charka =

American dancer

Satya Narayana Charka is a Kathak dancer, teacher, and choreographer. Among his awards is the first prize in the All-India Dance Competition. In 1981, he became the director of the East-West School of Dance in Monroe, New York.

He teaches around New York, and performs dance and dance dramas such as Shakuntala and Ramayana internationally.

== Productions by Satya Narayan Chakra ==
- Ramayana (1997)
- Krishna Leela
- Shakuntala
- Who is who?
- Gangavataran

== Kathak teachings and contributions ==
Charka taught at the American Education Foundation and the American International School from 1969 to 1972, the Ballet and Indian Dance Institute, Tokyo, in 1974, “Chinese University”, Kowloon, Hong Kong from 1973 to 1975, and the Department of Education, NSW, from 1980 to 1981. He has guest taught at the Bodenwieser Dance Centre, Sydney and the School of Performing Arts in New York City in 1982.
