= Podhruška =

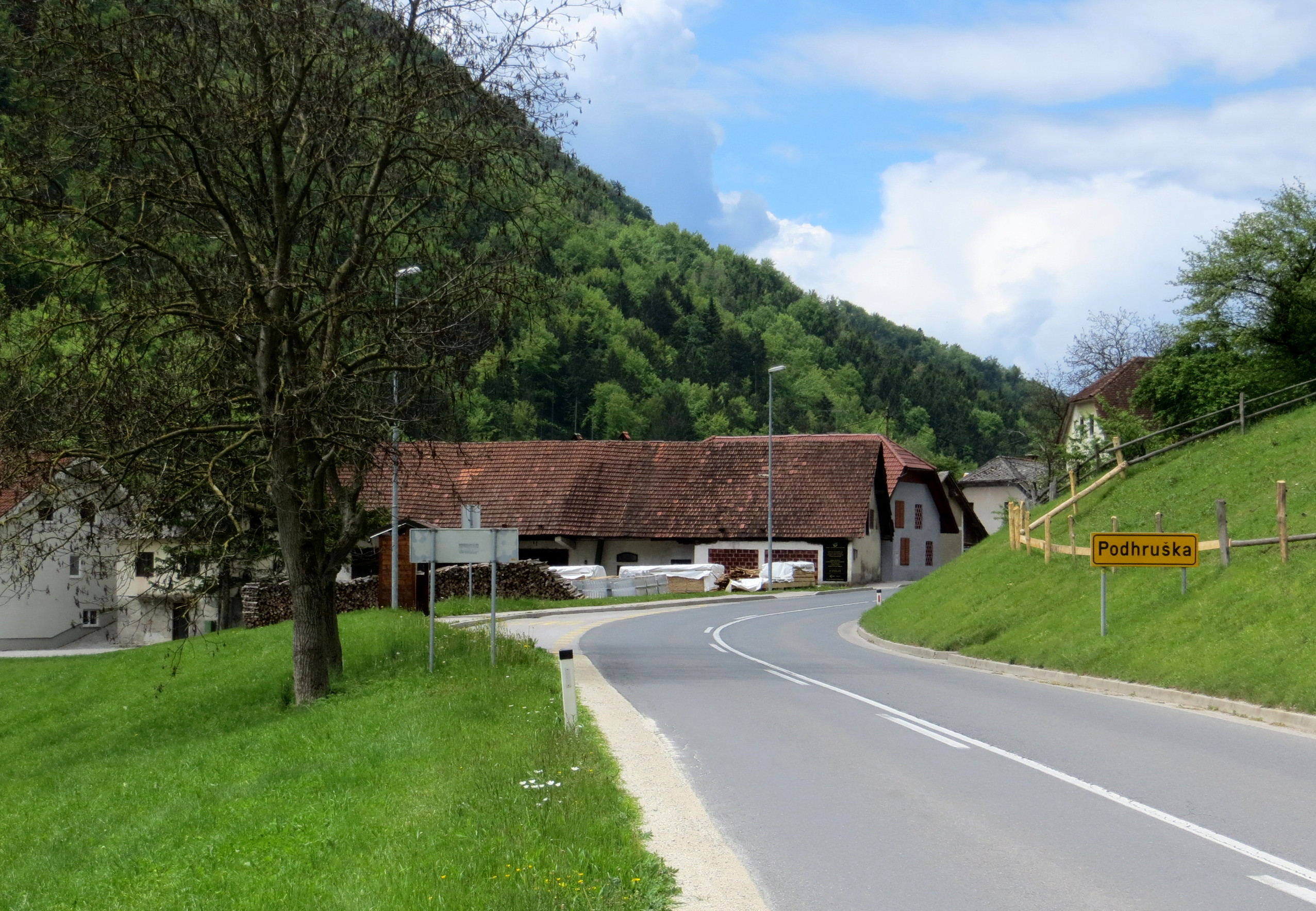

- Location in Slovenia
- Coordinates: 46°13′34.26″N 14°40′23.01″E
- Country: Slovenia
- Traditional region: Upper Carniola
- Statistical region: Central Slovenia
- Municipality: Kamnik

Area
  - Total: 0.82 km^{2} (0.32 sq mi)
- Elevation: 426.6 m (1,400 ft)

Population (2002)
  - Total: 68

Podhruška (pronounced [pɔtˈxɾuːʃka]; in older sources also Podhruško, German: Podhruschko) is a settlement on the Nevljica River at the Kamnik end of the Tuhinj Valley in the Upper Carniola region of Slovenia.
