= Chakradhar Satapathy =

Indian politician

Chakradhara Satapathy
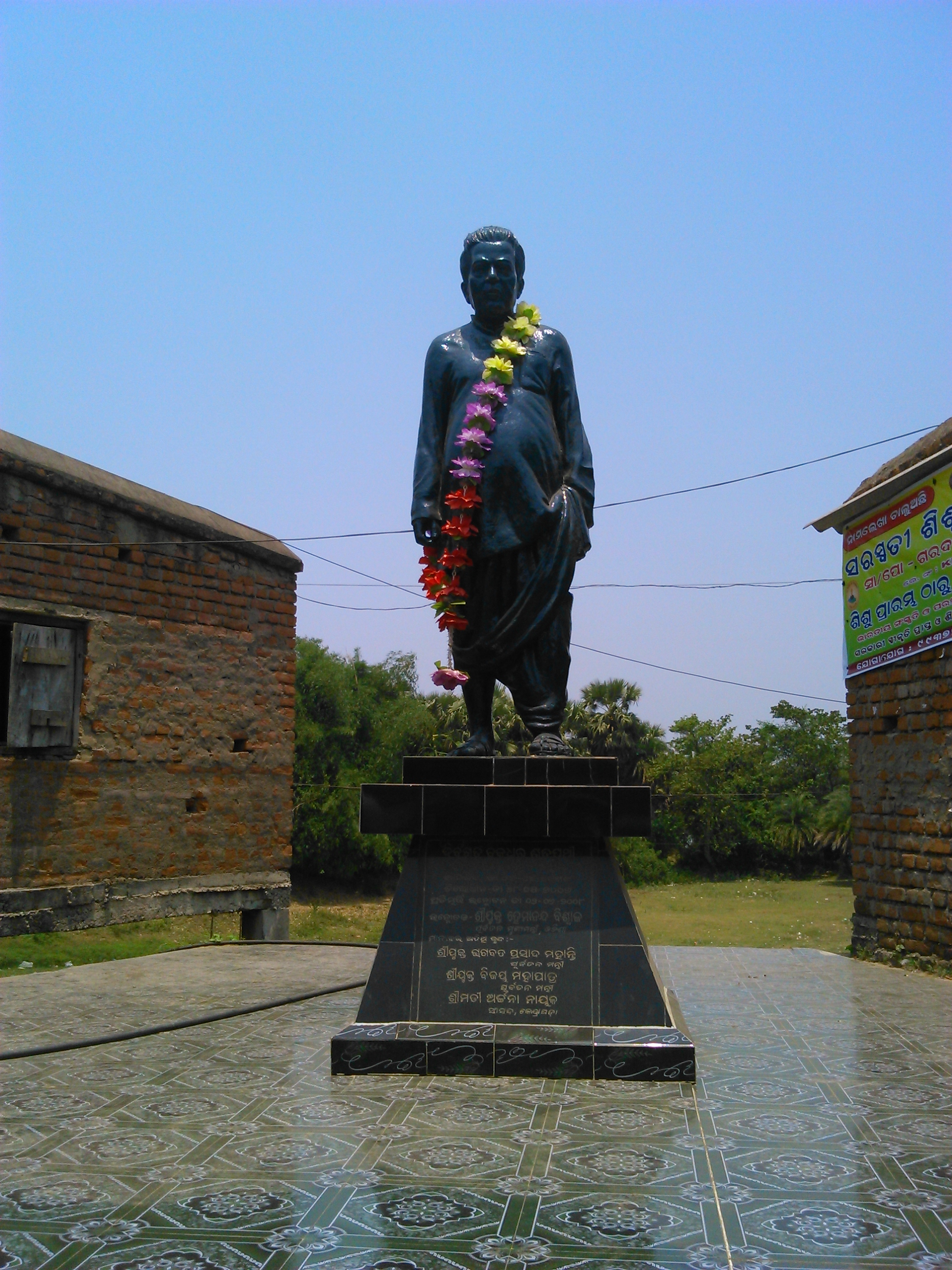
- A statue of Chakradhara satapathy at kalabuda Market
- Born: kalabuda, odisha, India
- Died: 2006 kalinga Hospital, Bhubaneswar
- Occupation: Politician

Chakradhara Satapathy was the former MLA of the Patakura assembly constituency. He was elected from the Patakura assembly constituency to the state assembly as a Praja Socialist Party (PSP) candidate in 1967 after defeating former chief minister Biju Patnaik. Mr.Satapathy, who began his career as a schoolteacher, resigned from his job in 1964 to join the PSP. In 1965, he was elected as the chairman of the Garadapur block. He was a resident of Kalabuda village.

He joined the Congress in 1971.

Satapathy was also involved in social work in his constituency Patakura.

In May 2006 he was staying in his village named as Kalabuda in the coastal district of Kendrapada, when he was 76, was admitted in the Kalinga Hospital and died.

Satapathy is survived by three daughters and a son.
