= Postage stamps and postal history of Bolivia =

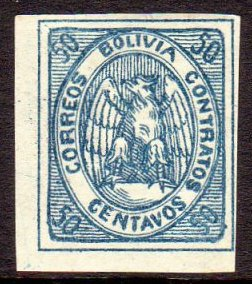
A 50-centavo "Condor". One of the first stamps of Bolivia.

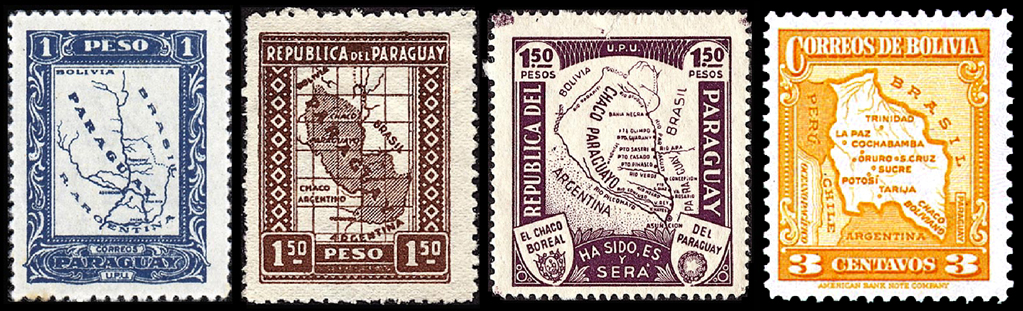
A selection of stamps from Paraguay and Bolivia 1924–1935

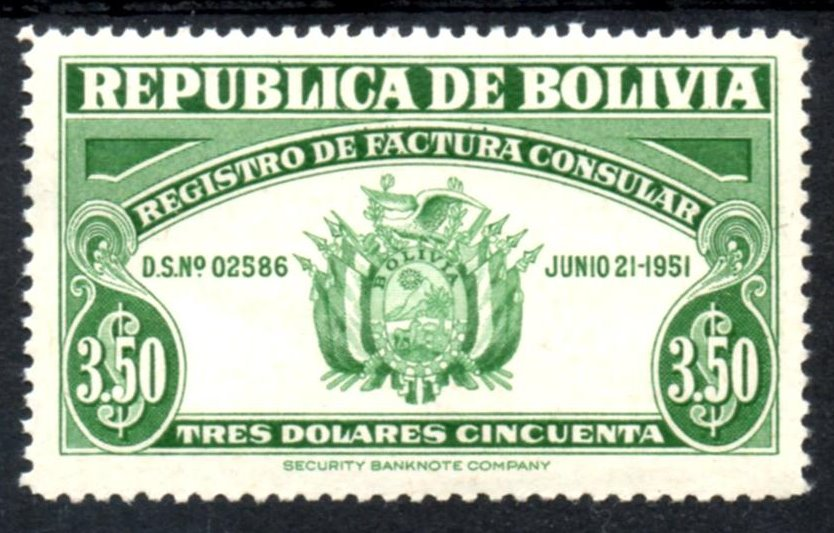
A 1951 revenue stamp of Bolivia

Bolivia was formerly known as Upper Peru and became an independent republic on 6 August 1825. It has produced its own postage stamps since 1867. Stamps from Bolivia are marked as Correos de Bolivia. Tensions between Chile and Bolivia have influenced both countries' stamps and postal history.

== History ==
Up to 1895 postal routes were composed mainly of the Oruro-Antofagasta railway, riders on horseback and river boats. Internal postal routes remained poor until the introduction of airmail in the 1920s.

British stamps were used between 1865 and 1878 at the port of Cobija, which no longer exists, and they may be identified by the cancellation C39.

Chilean stamps were used in occupied areas of Bolivia between 1 December 1881 and 11 October 1883.

== Gate of the sun ==
Bolivian postage stamps are a classical illustration of the problems caused by irregularities in production and the impact of large-scale inflation. Bolivia was one of the South American countries that made efforts to commemorate pre-Columbian times in the images used on the stamps. The "Gate of the sun" set of nineteen stamps was authorised in 1926 to commemorate Bolivia's independence. The stamps were engraved and printed in Germany, and on learning that the stamps had been sold without permission in Europe, the authorities ordered the rest to be locked in a bank vault where they remained for thirty-five years. When eventually they were released in 1960, inflation had caused havoc to Bolivia's currency and they needed to be surcharged, sometimes to 10,000 times their original denomination. The highest value five boliviano stamp was surcharged to become five thousand bolivianos.

== See also ==
- Revenue stamps of Bolivia
