= Consularization =

Legal authentication by a consul

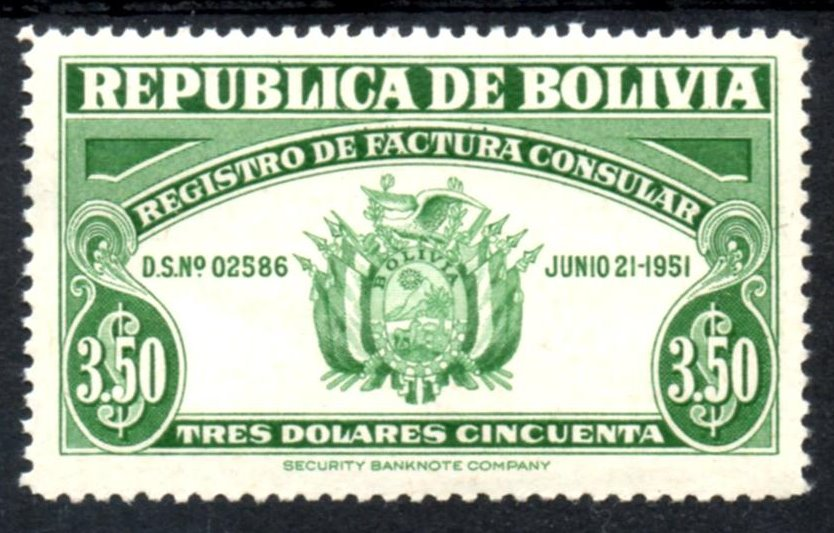
A Bolivian revenue stamp of 1951 to collect the fee on consular invoices.

In international law, consularization is the act of authenticating any legal document by the consul office, by the consul signing and affixing a red ribbon to the document. International trade shipments often require consular invoices and other documents that may need to be consularized include travel documents (such as a parental consent letter for persons under 18 traveling without a parent), letters of credit, and powers of attorney.

== Consular invoices ==
A consular invoice is a document, often in triplicate, submitted to the consul or embassy of a country to which goods are to be exported before the goods are sent abroad. The completed documents then travel with the goods and enable the customs officials in the destination country to verify the quantity, value and nature of the goods on arrival. A fee may be charged by the consulate for the checking and approval of the documents.

At the General Agreement on Tariffs and Trade round in 1952, it was proposed that consularization of commercial invoices be abolished. In 2005, the United States and Uganda submitted a proposal to the World Trade Organization to abolish consularization.

Alternative terms include konsularfaktura (German), facture consulaire (French), factura consular (Spanish), fattura consolare (Italian) and fatura consular (Portuguese Br.).
