= Dibromotetrafluoroethane =

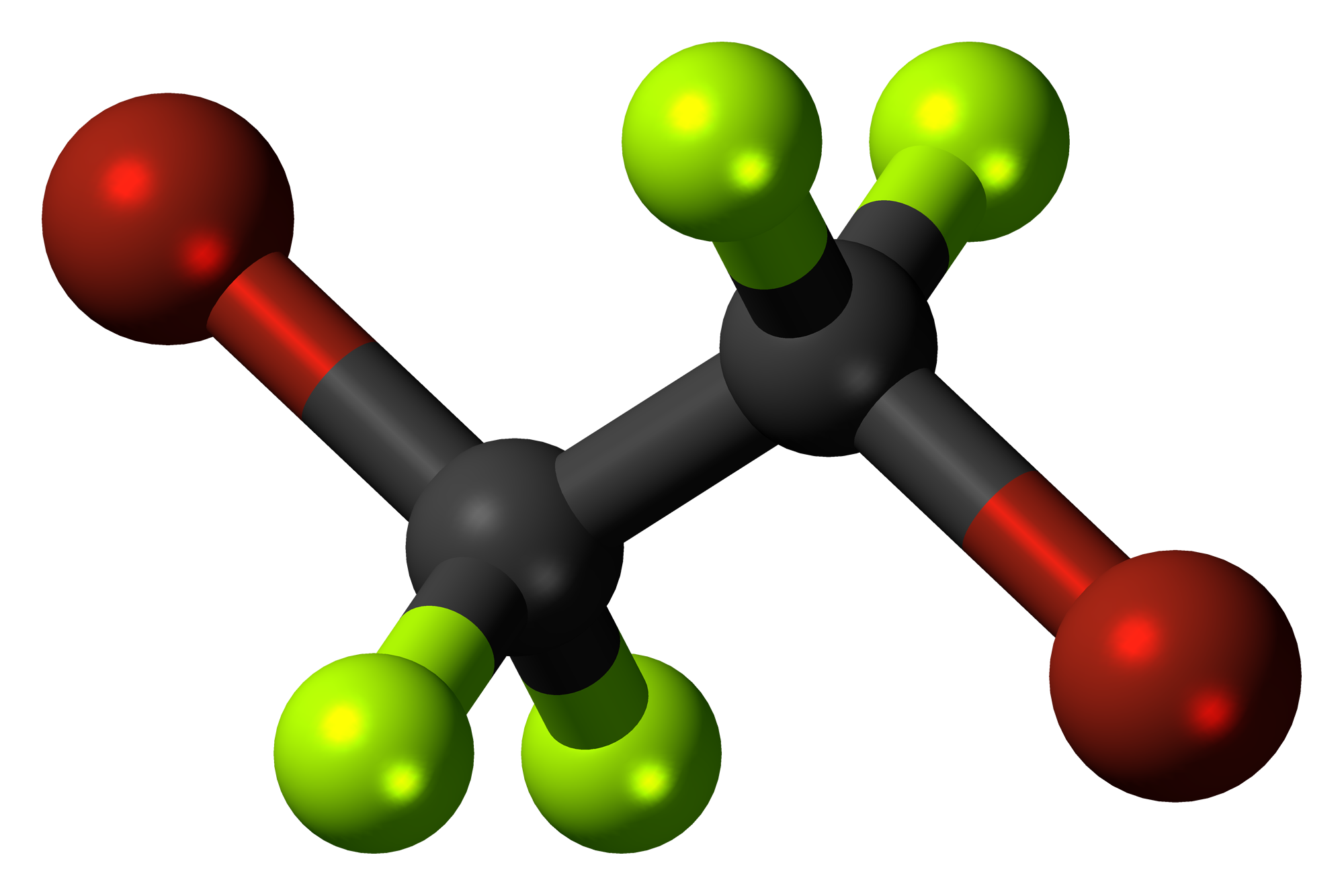

Names
- Preferred IUPAC name 1,2-Dibromo-1,1,2,2-tetrafluoroethane
- Other names R-114B2, Halon 2402

Identifiers
CAS Number	124-73-2
3D model (JSmol)	Interactive image
ChemSpider	29041
ECHA InfoCard	100.004.284
EC Number	204-711-9
PubChem CID	31301
UNII	1NJ2ZF1UN5
CompTox Dashboard (EPA)	DTXSID0041226
- InChI: InChI=1S/C2Br2F4/c3-1(5,6)2(4,7)8 Key: KVBKAPANDHPRDG-UHFFFAOYSA-N; InChI=1/C2Br2F4/c3-1(5,6)2(4,7)8 Key: KVBKAPANDHPRDG-UHFFFAOYAK
- SMILES: BrC(F)(F)C(Br)(F)F

Properties
Chemical formula	C_{2}Br_{2}F_{4}
Appearance	Colorless liquid
Density	2180 kg/m^{3} at 20°C
Boiling point	47.3 °C (117.1 °F; 320.4 K)
Solubility in water	not soluble in water

Hazards
- GHS labelling
Pictograms	(GHS07: Exclamation mark)
Signal word	Warning
Hazard statements	H420
Precautionary statements	P502
Safety data sheet (SDS)	External MSDS
- Except where otherwise noted, data are given for materials in their standard state (at 25 °C [77 °F], 100 kPa). verify (what is ?) Infobox references

1,2-Dibromotetrafluoroethane (C_{2}Br_{2}F_{4}) is a haloalkane. It is also known under codenames R-114B2 and Halon 2402. It is a colorless liquid with a boiling point of 47.2 °C. R-114B2 is occasionally used in fire suppression systems. It is highly volatile, passes through soil to air, and can be detected in the parts-per-quadrillion range.

Since July 1, 1994, the Montreal Protocol required all nations or parties that are a party to it to eliminate the production, consumption, and trade of ozone-depleting substances (ODS). Dibromotetrafluoroethane's high ozone-depleting potential (ODP) caused it to be identified as an ODS. Dibromotetrafluoroethane has been prohibited in Canada since July 1, 1994, "except for essential uses or for use as analytical standards".

On November 8, 2008, an accident aboard Russian submarine K-152 Nerpa involving the unintentional activation of a fire suppressant system loaded with R-114B2 resulted in the death of 20 people.

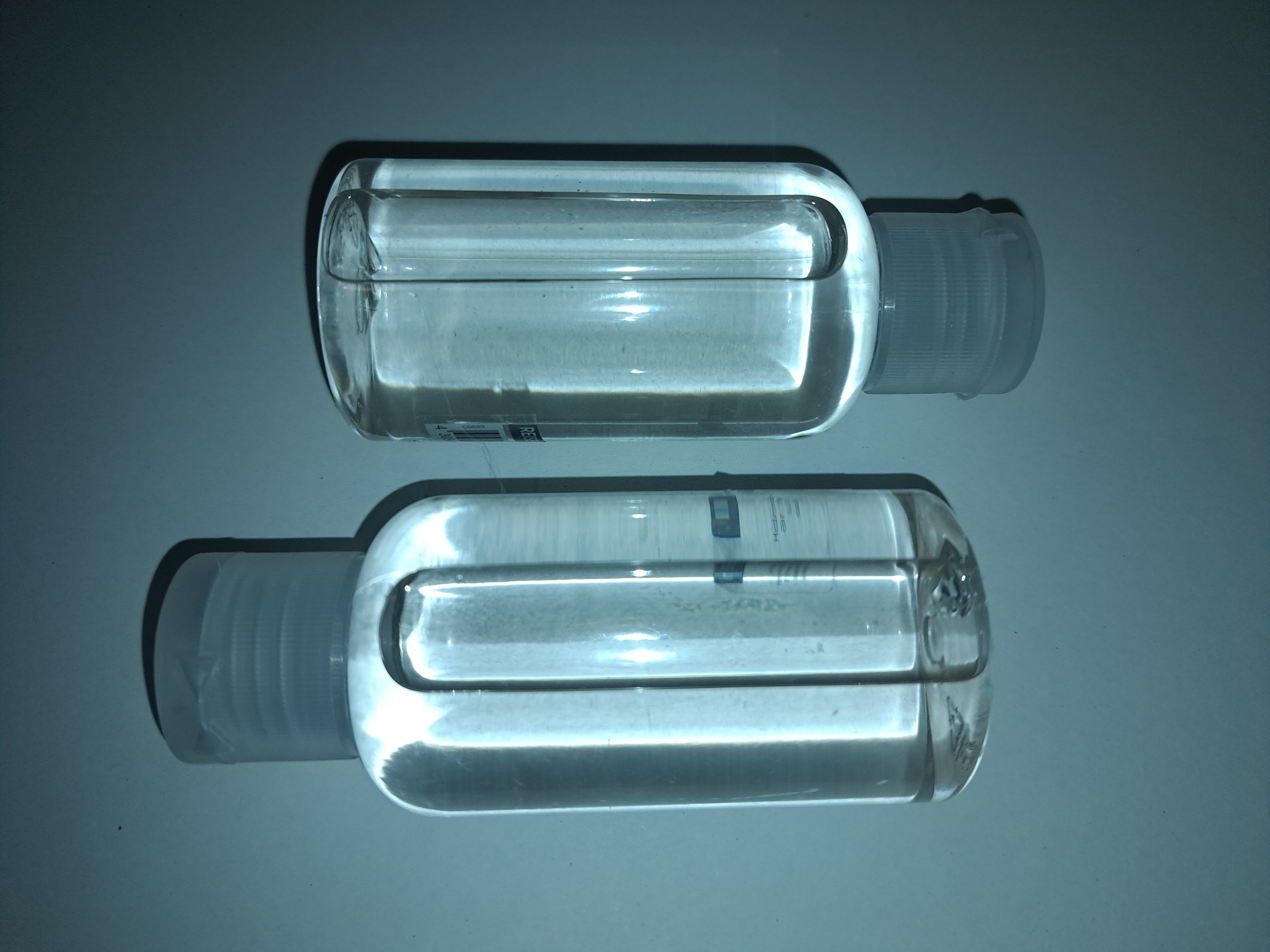
Liquid Dibromotetrafluoroethane

== Notes ==
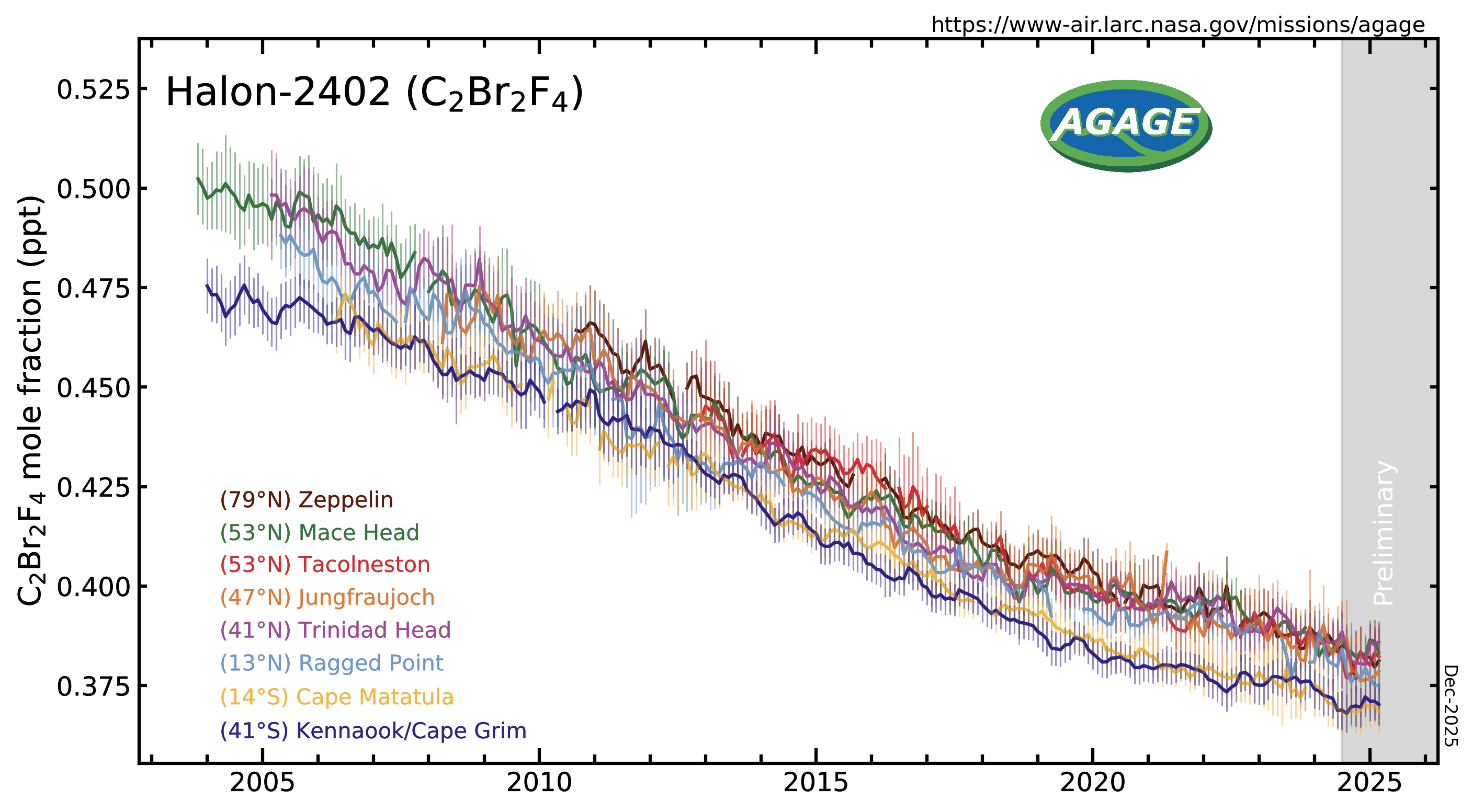
H-2402 measured by the Advanced Global Atmospheric Gases Experiment AGAGE in the lower atmosphere (troposphere) at stations around the world. Abundances are given as pollution free monthly mean mole fractions in parts-per-trillion.
