= INS Chakra =

The following ships of the Indian Navy have been named Chakra:

- INS Chakra (1987) was formerly the Charlie-class submarine K-43 leased in 1987 from Russia and returned in 1991
- INS Chakra (2011) was formerly the Akula-class submarine Nerpa leased from Russia in 2011 and returned in June 2021
