= List of active Indian Navy ships =

Naval ensign of Indian Navy

The Indian Navy, the naval warfare branch of the Indian Armed Forces, operates a fleet of about 131 surface combatant vessels and 20 submarines as of October 2026. By inventory, the Indian Navy's principal assets include its aircraft carriers – the service has operated four aircraft carriers since 1961 – and submarines, which presently includes a strategic submarine force. It also operates a fleet of amphibious assault ships, guided missile destroyers, and stealth frigates amongst others. However, it still lacks certain capability-specific assets such as mine countermeasures vessels, and has quantitatively inadequate fleet of certain vessels such as attack submarines.

The Indian Naval fleet inventory is divided amongst its three regional formations:

- Western Naval Command: Headquartered in Mumbai, it consists of the Western Fleet – responsible for naval operations in the Arabian Sea, which flanks India's western coastline. Given its geographical location, it is central to any conflict involving Pakistan.
- Eastern Naval Command: Headquartered in Visakhapatnam, it consists of the Eastern Fleet – responsible for naval operations in the Bay of Bengal, which flanks India's eastern coastline. In addition, it serves as the home command of India strategic submarine fleet – which oversees the country's nuclear second-strike deterrence force.
- Southern Naval Command: Headquartered in Kochi, it is the Indian Navy's largest command – responsible for service's training requirements.

The Indian Navy's Maritime Capability Perspective Plan for the period 2012–2027 had set the objective of the service becoming a 250-ship fleet by 2035. However, as of November 2025, the service is expected to achieve a fleet size of over 200 ships by 2035. Additionally, the Indian Naval Air Arm operates more than 250 aircraft, including carrier-based aircraft, helicopters, maritime patrol aircraft, in support of the fleet.

== Heritage fleet ==
Sailing ship
| Class | Image | Boat | No. | Disp. (t) | Comm. | Origin | Homeport | Note |
|---|---|---|---|---|---|---|---|---|
| Kaundinya-class | | INSV Kaundinya | - | 70 | 2025 | India | Karwar | Stitched sailing ship built in honor of Kaundinya I, with its design based on ancient paintings found in Ajanta Caves. |

== Submarine fleet ==
Nuclear ballistic missile submarine (3)
| Class | Image | Boat | No. | Disp. (t) | Comm. | Origin | Homeport | Note |
|---|---|---|---|---|---|---|---|---|
| Arihant class | | INS Arihant | S2 | 6,000 | 2016 | India | Visakhapatnam | First ever indigenously-built class of nuclear ballistic missile submarines. |
| Arihant class | | INS Arighaat | S3 | 6,000 | 2024 | India | Visakhapatnam | First ever indigenously-built class of nuclear ballistic missile submarines. |
| Arihant class | | INS Aridhaman | S4 | 7,000 | 2026 | India | Visakhapatnam | First ever indigenously-built class of nuclear ballistic missile submarines. |
Attack submarine (16)
| Class | Image | Boat | No. | Disp. (t) | Comm. | Origin | Homeport | Note |
| Kalvari class | | INS Kalvari | S21 | 1,800 | 2017 | France; India | Mumbai | Indian-specific variant of the Scorpène-class submarine. |
| Kalvari class | | INS Khanderi | S22 | 1,800 | 2019 | France; India | Karwar | Indian-specific variant of the Scorpène-class submarine. |
| Kalvari class | | INS Karanj | S23 | 1,800 | 2021 | France; India | Karwar | Indian-specific variant of the Scorpène-class submarine. |
| Kalvari class | | INS Vela | S24 | 1,800 | 2021 | France; India | Mumbai | Indian-specific variant of the Scorpène-class submarine. |
| Kalvari class | | INS Vagir | S25 | 1,800 | 2023 | France; India | Mumbai | Indian-specific variant of the Scorpène-class submarine. |
| Kalvari class | | INS Vagsheer | S26 | 1,800 | 2025 | France; India | Mumbai | Indian-specific variant of the Scorpène-class submarine. |
| Sindhughosh class | | INS Sindhuraj | S57 | 3,076 | 1987 | Soviet Union; Russia | Mumbai | Indian-specific variant of the Kilo-class submarine (P.877). |
| Sindhughosh class | | INS Sindhuratna | S59 | 3,076 | 1988 | Soviet Union; Russia | Mumbai | Indian-specific variant of the Kilo-class submarine (P.877). |
| Sindhughosh class | | INS Sindhukesari | S60 | 3,076 | 1988 | Soviet Union; Russia | Visakhapatnam | Indian-specific variant of the Kilo-class submarine (P.877). |
| Sindhughosh class | | INS Sindhukirti | S61 | 3,076 | 1989 | Soviet Union; Russia | Visakhapatnam | Indian-specific variant of the Kilo-class submarine (P.877). |
| Sindhughosh class | | INS Sindhuvijay | S62 | 3,076 | 1991 | Soviet Union; Russia | Visakhapatnam | Indian-specific variant of the Kilo-class submarine (P.877). |
| Sindhughosh class | | INS Sindhurashtra | S65 | 3,076 | 2000 | Soviet Union; Russia | Visakhapatnam | Indian-specific variant of the Kilo-class submarine (P.877). |
| Shishumar class | | INS Shishumar | S44 | 1,850 | 1986 | West Germany; India | Mumbai | Indian-specific variant of the Type 209/1500 submarine. |
| Shishumar class | | INS Shankush | S45 | 1,850 | 1986 | West Germany; India | Mumbai | Indian-specific variant of the Type 209/1500 submarine. |
| Shishumar class | | INS Shalki | S46 | 1,850 | 1992 | West Germany; India | Mumbai | Indian-specific variant of the Type 209/1500 submarine. |
| Shishumar class | | INS Shankul | S47 | 1,850 | 1994 | West Germany; India | Mumbai | Indian-specific variant of the Type 209/1500 submarine. |

== Surface fleet ==
=== Aircraft carriers ===
Aircraft carrier (2)
| Class | Image | Boat | No. | Disp. (t) | Comm. | Origin | Homeport | Note |
|---|---|---|---|---|---|---|---|---|
| Vikrant class | | INS Vikrant | R11 | 45,000 | 2022 | India | Karwar | First indigenously-built aircraft carrier. |
| Kiev class | | INS Vikramaditya | R33 | 45,000 | 2013 | Russia | Karwar | Ex-Soviet and Russian aircraft cruiser Gorshkov; refurbished and sold to India in 2004. |

=== Amphibious warfare ships ===
Amphibious transport dock (1)
| Class | Image | Boat | No. | Disp. (t) | Comm. | Origin | Homeport | Note |
|---|---|---|---|---|---|---|---|---|
| Austin class | | INS Jalashwa | L41 | 16,590 | 2007 | United States | Visakhapatnam | Ex-USS Trenton; refurbished and sold to India in 2007. |
Landing Ship Tank (4)
| Class | Image | Boat | No. | Disp. (t) | Comm. | Origin | Homeport | Note |
| Shardul class | | INS Shardul | L16 | 5,650 | 2007 | India | Kochi | Follow-on of the Magar Class Landing Ship Tanks . |
| Shardul class | | INS Kesari | L15 | 5,650 | 2008 | India | Sri Vijaya Puram | Follow-on of the Magar Class Landing Ship Tanks . |
| Shardul class | | INS Airavat | L24 | 5,650 | 2009 | India | Visakhapatnam | Follow-on of the Magar Class Landing Ship Tanks . |
| Magar class | | INS Gharial | L23 | 5,665 | 1997 | India | Visakhapatnam | |
Landing Craft Utility (8)
| Class | Image | Boat | No. | Disp. (t) | Comm. | Origin | Homeport | Note |
| Mk. IV LCU | | INS LCU 51 | L51 | 830 | 2017 | India | Sri Vijaya Puram | Follow-on of the Mk. III LCU class. |
| Mk. IV LCU | | INS LCU 52 | L52 | 830 | 2017 | India | Sri Vijaya Puram | Follow-on of the Mk. III LCU class. |
| Mk. IV LCU | | INS LCU 53 | L53 | 830 | 2018 | India | Sri Vijaya Puram | Follow-on of the Mk. III LCU class. |
| Mk. IV LCU | | INS LCU 54 | L54 | 830 | 2018 | India | Sri Vijaya Puram | Follow-on of the Mk. III LCU class. |
| Mk. IV LCU | | INS LCU 55 | L55 | 830 | 2018 | India | Sri Vijaya Puram | Follow-on of the Mk. III LCU class. |
| Mk. IV LCU | | INS LCU 56 | L56 | 830 | 2019 | India | Sri Vijaya Puram | Follow-on of the Mk. III LCU class. |
| Mk. IV LCU | | INS LCU 57 | L57 | 830 | 2020 | India | Sri Vijaya Puram | Follow-on of the Mk. III LCU class. |
| Mk. IV LCU | | INS LCU 58 | L58 | 830 | 2021 | India | Sri Vijaya Puram | Follow-on of the Mk. III LCU class. |

=== Destroyers ===
Destroyer (13)
| Class | Image | Boat | No. | Disp. (t) | Comm. | Origin | Homeport | Note |
|---|---|---|---|---|---|---|---|---|
| Visakhapatnam class | | INS Visakhapatnam | D66 | 7,400 | 2021 | India | Mumbai | Upgraded derivative of the Kolkata-class destroyers. |
| Visakhapatnam class | | INS Mormugao | D67 | 7,400 | 2022 | India | Karwar | Upgraded derivative of the Kolkata-class destroyers. |
| Visakhapatnam class | | INS Imphal | D68 | 7,400 | 2023 | India | Mumbai | Upgraded derivative of the Kolkata-class destroyers. |
| Visakhapatnam class | | INS Surat | D69 | 7,400 | 2025 | India | Mumbai | Upgraded derivative of the Kolkata-class destroyers. |
| Kolkata class | | INS Kolkata | D63 | 7,400 | 2014 | India | Mumbai | Upgraded derivative of Delhi-class destroyers. |
| Kolkata class | | INS Kochi | D64 | 7,400 | 2015 | India | Mumbai | Upgraded derivative of Delhi-class destroyers. |
| Kolkata class | | INS Chennai | D65 | 7,400 | 2016 | India | Karwar | Upgraded derivative of Delhi-class destroyers. |
| Delhi class | | INS Delhi | D61 | 6,200 | 1997 | India | Visakhapatnam | First class of indigenously-built destroyers. |
| Delhi class | | INS Mysore | D60 | 6,200 | 1999 | India | Visakhapatnam | First class of indigenously-built destroyers. |
| Delhi class | | INS Mumbai | D62 | 6,200 | 2001 | India | Visakhapatnam | First class of indigenously-built destroyers. |
| Rajput class | | INS Rana | D52 | 4,974 | 1982 | Soviet Union | Visakhapatnam | Indian-derivative of the Kashin class destroyers. |
| Rajput class | | INS Ranvir | D54 | 4,974 | 1986 | Soviet Union | Visakhapatnam | Indian-derivative of the Kashin class destroyers. |
| Rajput class | | INS Ranvijay | D55 | 4,974 | 1987 | Soviet Union | Visakhapatnam | Indian-derivative of the Kashin class destroyers. |

=== Frigates ===
Frigate (20)
| Class | Image | Boat | No. | Disp. (t) | Comm. | Origin | Homeport | Note |
|---|---|---|---|---|---|---|---|---|
| Nilgiri class | | INS Nilgiri | F33 | 6,670 | 2025 | India | Visakhapatnam | Upgraded derivative of Shivalik class frigates. |
| Nilgiri class | | INS Himgiri | F34 | 6,670 | 2025 | India | Visakhapatnam | Upgraded derivative of Shivalik class frigates. |
| Nilgiri class | | INS Udaygiri | F35 | 6,670 | 2025 | India | Visakhapatnam | Upgraded derivative of Shivalik class frigates. |
| Nilgiri class | | INS Taragiri | F41 | 6,670 | 2026 | India | Visakhapatnam | Upgraded derivative of Shivalik class frigates. |
| Nilgiri class | | INS Dunagiri | F36 | 6,670 | 2026 | India | Visakhapatnam | Upgraded derivative of Shivalik class frigates. |
| Nilgiri class | | INS Mahendragiri | F38 | 6,670 | 2026 | India | Visakhapatnam | Upgraded derivative of Shivalik class frigates. |
| Shivalik class | | INS Shivalik | F47 | 6,200 | 2010 | India | Visakhapatnam | Indigenously-built frigates with low observability. |
| Shivalik class | | INS Satpura | F48 | 6,200 | 2011 | India | Visakhapatnam | Indigenously-built frigates with low observability. |
| Shivalik class | | INS Sahyadri | F49 | 6,200 | 2012 | India | Visakhapatnam | Indigenously-built frigates with low observability. |
| Talwar class | | INS Talwar | F40 | 4,035 | 2003 | Russia | Mumbai | Improved derivative of the Krivak-III frigate. |
| Talwar class | | INS Trishul | F43 | 4,035 | 2003 | Russia | Mumbai | Improved derivative of the Krivak-III frigate. |
| Talwar class | | INS Tabar | F44 | 4,035 | 2004 | Russia | Mumbai | Improved derivative of the Krivak-III frigate. |
| Talwar class | | INS Teg | F45 | 4,035 | 2012 | Russia | Mumbai | Improved derivative of the Krivak-III frigate. |
| Talwar class | | INS Tarkash | F50 | 4,035 | 2012 | Russia | Mumbai | Improved derivative of the Krivak-III frigate. |
| Talwar class | | INS Trikand | F51 | 4,035 | 2013 | Russia | Mumbai | Improved derivative of the Krivak-III frigate. |
| Talwar class | | INS Tushil | F70 | 4,035 | 2024 | Russia | Karwar | Improved derivative of the Krivak-III frigate. |
| Talwar class | | INS Tamal | F71 | 4,035 | 2025 | Russia | Karwar | Improved derivative of the Krivak-III frigate. |
| Brahmaputra class | | INS Brahmaputra | F31 | 3,850 | 2000 | India | Mumbai | Upgraded derivative of the Godavari class. |
| Brahmaputra class | | INS Betwa | F39 | 3,850 | 2004 | India | Mumbai | Upgraded derivative of the Godavari class. |
| Brahmaputra class | | INS Beas | F37 | 3,850 | 2005 | India | Mumbai | Upgraded derivative of the Godavari class. |

=== Corvettes ===
Corvette (24)
| Class | Image | Boat | No. | Disp. (t) | Comm. | Origin | Homeport | Note |
|---|---|---|---|---|---|---|---|---|
| Arnala class | Arnala Sub-class | INS Arnala | P68 | 1,490 | 2025 | India | Visakhapatnam | ASW SWC vessels for anti-submarine warfare in littoral waters. To replace the former Abhay-class corvette. |
| Arnala class | Arnala Sub-class | INS Androth | P69 | 1,490 | 2025 | India | Visakhapatnam | ASW SWC vessels for anti-submarine warfare in littoral waters. To replace the former Abhay-class corvette. |
| Arnala class | Arnala Sub-class | INS Anjadip | P73 | 1,490 | 2026 | India | Visakhapatnam | ASW SWC vessels for anti-submarine warfare in littoral waters. To replace the former Abhay-class corvette. |
| Arnala class | Arnala Sub-class | INS Agray | P36 | 1,490 | 2026 | India | Visakhapatnam | ASW SWC vessels for anti-submarine warfare in littoral waters. To replace the former Abhay-class corvette. |
| Mahe class | Mahe sub-class | INS Mahe | P80 | 1,100 | 2025 | India | Mumbai | ASW SWC vessels for anti-submarine warfare in littoral waters. To replace the former Abhay-class corvette. |
| Mahe class | Mahe sub-class | INS Malwan | P81 | 1,100 | 2026 | India | Karwar | ASW SWC vessels for anti-submarine warfare in littoral waters. To replace the former Abhay-class corvette. |
| Mahe class | Mahe sub-class | INS Mangrol | P82 | 1,100 | 2026 | India | Mumbai | ASW SWC vessels for anti-submarine warfare in littoral waters. To replace the former Abhay-class corvette. |
| Kamorta class | | INS Kamorta | P28 | 3,300 | 2014 | India | Visakhapatnam | Dedicated anti-submarine warfare vessels. |
| Kamorta class | | INS Kadmatt | P29 | 3,300 | 2016 | India | Visakhapatnam | Dedicated anti-submarine warfare vessels. |
| Kamorta class | | INS Kiltan | P30 | 3,300 | 2017 | India | Visakhapatnam | Dedicated anti-submarine warfare vessels. |
| Kamorta class | | INS Kavaratti | P31 | 3,300 | 2020 | India | Visakhapatnam | Dedicated anti-submarine warfare vessels. |
| Kora class | | INS Kora | P61 | 1,400 | 1998 | India | Visakhapatnam | Dedicated anti-surface warfare vessels. |
| Kora class | | INS Kirch | P62 | 1,400 | 2001 | India | Visakhapatnam | Dedicated anti-surface warfare vessels. |
| Kora class | | INS Kulish | P63 | 1,400 | 2001 | India | Sri Vijaya Puram | Dedicated anti-surface warfare vessels. |
| Kora class | | INS Karmuk | P64 | 1,400 | 2004 | India | Sri Vijaya Puram | Dedicated anti-surface warfare vessels. |
| Khukri class | | INS Kuthar | P46 | 1,350 | 1990 | India | Visakhapatnam | Successor to the IN's Petya II corvettes. |
| Khukri class | | INS Khanjar | P47 | 1,350 | 1991 | India | Visakhapatnam | Successor to the IN's Petya II corvettes. |
| Veer class | | INS Vibhuti | K45 | 455 | 1991 | India | Mumbai | Customised derivative of the Tarantul-class corvette; used in an anti-surface role. |
| Veer class | | INS Vipul | K46 | 455 | 1992 | India | Mumbai | Customised derivative of the Tarantul-class corvette; used in an anti-surface role. |
| Veer class | | INS Vinash | K47 | 455 | 1993 | India | Mumbai | Customised derivative of the Tarantul-class corvette; used in an anti-surface role. |
| Veer class | | INS Vidyut | K48 | 455 | 1995 | India | Mumbai | Customised derivative of the Tarantul-class corvette; used in an anti-surface role. |
| Veer class | | INS Nashak | K83 | 455 | 1994 | India | Mumbai | Customised derivative of the Tarantul-class corvette; used in an anti-surface role. |
| Veer class | | INS Pralaya | K91 | 455 | 2002 | India | Mumbai | Customised derivative of the Tarantul-class corvette; used in an anti-surface role. |
| Veer class | | INS Prabal | K92 | 455 | 2002 | India | Mumbai | Customised derivative of the Tarantul-class corvette; used in an anti-surface role. |

=== Patrol vessels ===
Offshore Patrol Vessel (10)
| Class | Image | Boat | No. | Disp. (t) | Comm. | Origin | Homeport | Note |
|---|---|---|---|---|---|---|---|---|
| Saryu class | | INS Saryu | P54 | 2,300 | 2013 | India | Sri Vijaya Puram | Used for maritime patrol operations. |
| Saryu class | | INS Sunayna | P57 | 2,300 | 2013 | India | Kochi | Used for maritime patrol operations. |
| Saryu class | | INS Sumedha | P58 | 2,300 | 2014 | India | Sri Vijaya Puram | Used for maritime patrol operations. |
| Saryu class | | INS Sumitra | P59 | 2,300 | 2014 | India | Chennai | Used for maritime patrol operations. |
| Sukanya class | | INS Sukanya | P50 | 1,900 | 1989 | South Korea; India | Mumbai | Doubled as light frigates; served additional role as missile test platforms. |
| Sukanya class | | INS Subhadra | P51 | 1,900 | 1990 | South Korea; India | Mumbai | Doubled as light frigates; served additional role as missile test platforms. |
| Sukanya class | | INS Suvarna | P52 | 1,900 | 1991 | South Korea; India | Mumbai | Doubled as light frigates; served additional role as missile test platforms. |
| Sukanya class | | INS Savitri | P53 | 1,900 | 1990 | South Korea; India | Visakhapatnam | Doubled as light frigates; served additional role as missile test platforms. |
| Sukanya class | | INS Sharda | P55 | 1,900 | 1991 | South Korea; India | Kochi | Doubled as light frigates; served additional role as missile test platforms. |
| Sukanya class | | INS Sujata | P56 | 1,900 | 1993 | South Korea; India | Kochi | Doubled as light frigates; served additional role as missile test platforms. |
Fast Attack Craft (19)
| Class | Image | Boat | No. | Disp. (t) | Comm. | Origin | Homeport | Note |
| Car Nicobar class | | INS Car Nicobar | T69 | 293 | 2009 | India | Chennai | Follow on of the Bangaram class vessels. |
| Car Nicobar class | | INS Chetlat | T70 | 293 | 2009 | India | Chennai | Follow on of the Bangaram class vessels. |
| Car Nicobar class | | INS Cora Divh | T71 | 293 | 2009 | India | Sri Vijaya Puram | Follow on of the Bangaram class vessels. |
| Car Nicobar class | | INS Cheriyam | T72 | 293 | 2009 | India | Sri Vijaya Puram | Follow on of the Bangaram class vessels. |
| Car Nicobar class | | INS Cankaraso | T73 | 293 | 2010 | India | Goa | Follow on of the Bangaram class vessels. |
| Car Nicobar class | | INS Kondul | T74 | 293 | 2010 | India | Goa | Follow on of the Bangaram class vessels. |
| Car Nicobar class | | INS Kalpeni | T75 | 293 | 2010 | India | Kochi | Follow on of the Bangaram class vessels. |
| Car Nicobar class | | INS Kabra | T76 | 293 | 2011 | India | Kochi | Follow on of the Bangaram class vessels. |
| Car Nicobar class | | INS Koswari | T77 | 293 | 2011 | India | Karwar | Follow on of the Bangaram class vessels. |
| Car Nicobar class | | INS Karuva | T78 | 293 | 2011 | India | Mumbai | Follow on of the Bangaram class vessels. |
| Car Nicobar class | | INS Tihayu | T93 | 315 | 2016 | India | Karwar | Follow on of the Bangaram class vessels; the first water jet-propelled ships in the IN. |
| Car Nicobar class | | INS Tillanchang | T92 | 315 | 2017 | India | Visakhapatnam | Follow on of the Bangaram class vessels; the first water jet-propelled ships in the IN. |
| Car Nicobar class | | INS Tarasa | T94 | 315 | 2017 | India | Mumbai | Follow on of the Bangaram class vessels; the first water jet-propelled ships in the IN. |
| Bangaram class | | INS Bangaram | T65 | 260 | 2006 | India | Sri Vijaya Puram | Used for SAR and naval interdiction. |
| Bangaram class | | INS Bitra | T66 | 260 | 2006 | India | Sri Vijaya Puram | Used for SAR and naval interdiction. |
| Bangaram class | | INS Batti Malv | T67 | 260 | 2006 | India | Sri Vijaya Puram | Used for SAR and naval interdiction. |
| Bangaram class | | INS Baratang | T68 | 260 | 2006 | India | Sri Vijaya Puram | Used for SAR and naval interdiction. |
| Trinkat class | | INS Trinkat | T62 | 260 | 2000 | India | Visakhapatnam | Used for SAR. |
| Trinkat class | | INS Tarmugli | T66 | 260 | 2001 | India | Visakhapatnam | Used for SAR. |
Patrol Boat (117)
| Class | Image | Boat | No. | Disp. (t) | Comm. | Origin | Homeport | Note |
| Immediate Support Vessel | | 23 in service | 81st ISV Squadron: T-11, T-12, T-13, T-14, T-15, T-16, T-17 | 60 | 2014 | India | Mumbai | Used by ONGC to protect off-shore establishments. |
| Immediate Support Vessel | | 23 in service | 82nd ISV Squadron: T-26, T-27, T-28, T-44, T-45, T-46, T-47, T-48, T-49, T-50 | 60 | 2015 | India | Mumbai | Used by ONGC to protect off-shore establishments. |
| Immediate Support Vessel | | 23 in service | 83rd ISV Squadron: T-35, T-36, T-37 | 60 | 2014 | India | Visakhapatnam | Used by ONGC to protect off-shore establishments. |
| Immediate Support Vessel | | 23 in service | 84th ISV Squadron: T-38, T-39, T-40 | 60 | 2015 | India | Visakhapatnam | Used by ONGC to protect off-shore establishments. |
| Super Dvora Mk II | | 2 in service | FAC T-83 | 60 | 1998 | Israel | Mumbai | Used for coastal security operations. |
| Super Dvora Mk II | | 2 in service | FAC T-84 | 60 | 1998 | Israel | Mumbai | Used for coastal security operations. |
| Solas Marine FIC | | 76 in service | — | 40 | 2013–2017 | Sri Lanka | Distributed across all Naval commands | Operated by Sagar Prahari Bal. |
| Couach Type 1300 FIC | — | 15 in service | — | 12 | 2010–2012 | France | | Used for harbor patrol. |

== Auxiliary fleet ==
=== Replenishment ships ===
Replenishment Oiler (4)
| Class | Image | Ship | No. | Disp. (t) | Comm. | Origin | Note |
|---|---|---|---|---|---|---|---|
| Deepak class | | INS Deepak | A50 | 27,500 | 2011 | Italy | Serves dual roles of fleet support and HADR |
| Deepak class | | INS Shakti | A57 | 27,500 | 2011 | Italy | Serves dual roles of fleet support and HADR |
| Jyoti class | | INS Jyoti | A58 | 35,900 | 1996 | Russia | Indian variant of the Komandarm Fedko-class oilers. |
| Aditya class | | INS Aditya | A59 | 24,612 | 2000 | India | Modified version of the Deepak-class oilers. |

=== Instrumentation ships ===
Instrumentation Ship (2)
| Class | Image | Ship | No. | Disp. (t) | Comm. | Origin | Note |
|---|---|---|---|---|---|---|---|
| Anvesh class | | INS Anvesh | A41 | 11,300 | 2022 | India | Used to test components of India's BMD programme. |
| Dhruv class | | INS Dhruv | A40 | 15,000 | 2021 | India | Used for SIGINT. Jointly operated by NTRO, DRDO, and the Indian Navy. |

=== Research and survey vessels ===
Survey vessel (10)
| Class | Image | Ship | No. | Disp. (t) | Comm. | Origin | Note |
|---|---|---|---|---|---|---|---|
| Sandhayak-class (2023) | | INS Sandhayak | J18 | 3,300 | 2024 | India | Will replace the older Sandhayak class. |
| Sandhayak-class (2023) | | INS Nirdeshak | J19 | 3,300 | 2024 | India | Will replace the older Sandhayak class. |
| Sandhayak-class (2023) | | INS Ikshak | J23 | 3,300 | 2025 | India | Will replace the older Sandhayak class. |
| Sandhayak-class (2023) | | INS Sanshodhak | J24 | 3,300 | 2026 | India | Will replace the older Sandhayak class. |
| Makar class | | INS Makar | J31 | 500 | 2012 | India | First catamaran survey vessel in the IN. |
| Sandhayak class (1981) | | INS Investigator | J15 | 1,800 | 1990 | India | Currently being phased out. |
| Sandhayak class (1981) | | INS Jamuna | J16 | 1,800 | 1991 | India | Currently being phased out. |
| Sandhayak class (1981) | | INS Sutlej | J17 | 1,800 | 1993 | India | Currently being phased out. |
| Sandhayak class (1981) | | INS Darshak | J21 | 1,800 | 2001 | India | Currently being phased out. |
| Sandhayak class (1981) | | INS Sarvekshak | J22 | 1,800 | 2002 | India | Currently being phased out. |
Research vessel (1)
| Class | Image | Ship | No. | Disp. (t) | Comm. | Origin | Note |
| Sagardhwani class | | INS Sagardhwani | A74 | 2,050 | 1994 | India | Used for oceanographic research by the NPOL. |

Torpedo trials craft (1)
| Class | Image | Ship | No. | Disp. (t) | Comm. | Origin | Note |
|---|---|---|---|---|---|---|---|
| Astradharani class | | INS Astradharani | A61 | 650 | 2015 | India | Used as testing platform for underwater weapons system. |

=== Diving support vessels ===
Diving support vessel (3)
| Class | Image | Ship | No. | Disp. (t) | Comm. | Homeport | Origin | Note |
|---|---|---|---|---|---|---|---|---|
| Nistar class | | INS Nistar | A16 | 9,350 | 2025 | Visakapatnam | India | First indigenously designed class of diving support vessels. |
| Nistar class | | INS Nipun | A17 | 9,350 | 2026 | Mumbai | India | First indigenously designed class of diving support vessels. |
| Diving Support Craft | | INS A20 | A20 | 390 | 2025 | Kochi | India | Small DSC built by Titagarh Rail Systems Limited. 3 more under construction. |
| Diving Support Craft | | INS DSC A21 | A21 | 390 | TBD | TBD | India | Small DSC built by Titagarh Rail Systems Limited. 3 more under construction. |
| Nireekshak class | | INS Nireekshak | A15 | 2,160 | 1989 | Visakapatnam | India | Will be replaced by the Nistar-class support vessels. |

Deep-submergence rescue vehicle (2)
| Class | Image | Boat | No. | Disp. (t) | Comm. | Origin | Note |
|---|---|---|---|---|---|---|---|
| DSAR | | DSAR-1 | – | 28 | 2018 | United Kingdom | Used for submarine rescue; Paired with the Nistar-class diving support vessels. |
| DSAR | | DSAR-2 | — | 28 | 2019 | United Kingdom | Used for submarine rescue; Paired with the Nistar-class diving support vessels. |

=== Training ships ===
Training ship (6)
| Class | Image | Ship | Pennant No. | Disp. (t) | Origin | Note |
|---|---|---|---|---|---|---|
| Tir class | | INS Tir | A86 | 3,200 | India | Dedicated cadet training ship. |
| Tarangini class | | INS Tarangini | A75 | 500 | India | Used for sail training. |
| Tarangini class | | INS Sudarshini | A77 | 500 | India | Used for sail training. |
| Varuna class | — | INS Varuna | – | 110 | India | Used for sail training. |
| Mhadei class | | INSV Mhadei | A76 | 23 | India | Used for solo, unassisted, non-stop circumnavigation. |
| Mhadei class | | INSV Tarini | — | 23 | India | Used for solo, unassisted, non-stop circumnavigation. |

=== Tugboats ===
Tugboat (26)
| Class | Image | Boat | Pennant No. | Disp. (t) | Origin | Note |
|---|---|---|---|---|---|---|
| Bhishm class | | INS Yuvan | — | — | India | 25 tonne bollard pull tugs |
| Bhishm class | | INS Ojas | — | — | India | 25 tonne bollard pull tugs |
| Gaj class | | INS Gaj | A51 | 560 | India | — |
| IRS class | — | INS Himmat | — | 472 | India | 50 tonne bollard pull tugs |
| IRS class | — | INS Dhiraj | — | 472 | India | 50 tonne bollard pull tugs |
| IRS class | — | INS Sahas | — | 472 | India | 50 tonne bollard pull tugs |
| IRS class | — | INS Veeran | — | 472 | India | 50 tonne bollard pull tugs |
| Madan Singh class | — | INS Madan Singh | — | 382 | India | — |
| Madan Singh class | — | INS Shambhu Singh | — | 382 | India | — |
| Bhim class | — | INS Bhim | — | 373 | India | — |
| Bhim class | — | INS Balshil | — | 373 | India | — |
| Bhim class | — | INS Ajral | — | 373 | India | — |
| Nakul class | — | INS Nakul | — | 373 | India | — |
| Nakul class | — | INS Arjun | — | 373 | India | — |
| B.C. Dutt class | — | INS B. C. Dutt | — | 355 | India | — |
| B.C. Dutt class | — | INS Tarafdar | — | 355 | India | — |
| Arga class | — | INS Arga | — | 239 | India | — |
| Arga class | — | INS Bali | — | 239 | India | — |
| Arga class | — | INS Anup | — | 239 | India | — |
| Arga class | — | INS 148 | — | 239 | India | — |
| Arga class | — | INS 149 | — | 239 | India | — |
| Arga class | — | INS 150 | — | 239 | India | — |
| Buland class | — | INS Buland | — | 100 | India | 25 tonne bollard pull tugs |
| Buland class | — | INS Balwan | — | 100 | India | 25 tonne bollard pull tugs |
| Buland class | — | INS Sahayak | — | 100 | India | 25 tonne bollard pull tugs |
| Sarthi class | — | INS Sarthi | — | 100 | India | 25 tonne bollard pull tugs |

=== Miscellaneous vessels ===
Ferry (13)
| Class | Image | Ship | Pennant No. | Disp. (t) | Origin | Note |
|---|---|---|---|---|---|---|
| Manoram class | — | INS Manoram | — | 578 | India | |
| Manoram class | — | INS Vihar | — | 578 | India | |
| Manoram class | — | INS Ankola | — | 578 | India | |
| Shalimar class (50 men) | — | INS Neelam | — | 218 | India | |
| Shalimar class (50 men) | — | INS Mohini | — | 218 | India | |
| Shalimar class (50 men) | — | INS | — | 218 | India | |
| Shalimar class (250 men) | — | INS Manohar | — | 175 | India | |
| Shalimar class (250 men) | — | INS | — | 175 | India | |
| Shalimar class (250 men) | — | INS Modak | — | 175 | India | |
| Shalimar class (250 men) | — | INS Mangal | — | 175 | India | |
| Shalimar class (250 men) | — | INS Madhur | — | 175 | India | |
| Shalimar class (250 men) | — | INS Manorama | — | 175 | India | |
| Shalimar class (250 men) | | INS Manjula | 786 | 175 | India | |

Floating dock (2)
| Class | Image | Ship | Pennant No. | Disp. (t) | Origin | Note |
|---|---|---|---|---|---|---|
| Floating Dock Navy (FDN) | | FDN-1 | — | — | Japan | Lifting capacity of 11,500. Deployed at Sri Vijaya Puram. |
| Floating Dock Navy (FDN) | | FDN-2 | - | | India | Lifting capacity of 8,000. Deployed at Sri Vijaya Puram. |

Barge (37)
| Class | Image | Boat | Pennant No. | Disp. (t) | Origin | Note |
|---|---|---|---|---|---|---|
| IRS class ACTCM | | LSAM 7 to 14 | 75 to 82 | 100 | India | First batch and second batch, classified as MCA and ACTCM barges, have been constructed by SECON Engineering and Suryadipta Projects, respectively. These provide logistics support to ships. |
| IRS class ACTCM | | LSAM 15 to 24 | 125 to 135 | 100 | India | First batch and second batch, classified as MCA and ACTCM barges, have been constructed by SECON Engineering and Suryadipta Projects, respectively. These provide logistics support to ships. |
| Hooghly class | — | INS Hooghly | — | 1,700 | India | — |
| Hooghly class | — | — | — | 1,700 | India | — |
| Hooghly class | — | — | — | 1,700 | India | — |
| Hooghly class | — | — | — | 1,700 | India | — |
| Ambika class | | INS Ambika | — | 1000 | India | High Sulphur Diesel Oiler built by HSL in 1993 |
| Modest class | — | INS Purak | — | 731 | India | — |
| Modest class | — | INS Puran | — | 731 | India | — |
| Poshak class | — | INS Poshak | — | 671 | India | — |
| Vipul class | — | INS Pamba | — | 578 | India | — |
| Vipul class | — | INS Pulakesin-1 | — | 578 | India | — |
| Vipul class | — | INS Ambuda | — | 578 | India | — |
| Corporated class | — | INS SB-I | — | 220 | India | — |
| Corporated class | — | INS SB-II | — | 220 | India | — |
| Corporated class | — | INS SB-V | — | 220 | India | — |
| Corporated class | — | INS SB-VII | — | 220 | India | — |
| Amrit-class victualling barge | — | INS Amrit | — | tonnes | India | — |
| Amrit-class victualling barge | — | INS Pankaj | — | tonnes | India | — |
| Sahayak-class hopper barge | — | INS Sahayak | — | tonnes | India | — |
| Sahayak-class hopper barge | — | INS Sevak | — | tonnes | India | — |

Dredger (4)
| Class | Boat | Pennant No. | Disp. (t) | Origin | Note |
|---|---|---|---|---|---|
| Dredger-1 | Dredger 1 | — | — | India | First dedicated class of dredging vessels built in India. |
| Khadan class | INS Khadan | 1055 | — | India | Grab Dredger built by GSL |
| Nikaraksha-class | INS Nikarakshat | — | — | India | built by Mazagon Dock Limited, Mumbai |
| Nikaraksha-class | INS Kichodhara | — | — | India | built by Mazagon Dock Limited, Mumbai |

== See also ==
=== Assets of the Indian Navy ===
- Future of the Indian Navy
- List of historical ships of the Indian Navy
- List of Indian Navy bases
- Aircraft of the Indian Navy
- List of submarines of the Indian Navy
- List of destroyers of the Indian Navy
- List of frigates of the Indian Navy
- List of corvettes of the Indian Navy
- List of warships gifted by India
- Weapon systems of the Indian Navy

=== Infrastructure of the Indian Armed Forces ===
- Indian Army:
  - List of equipment of the Indian Army
- Indian Air Force:
  - List of Indian Air Force stations
  - List of active Indian military aircraft

=== Other related topics ===
- India's overseas military bases
- List of equipment of the Indian Coast Guard
