= Shalimar-class ferry =

Shalimar-class ferry may refer to:

- Shalimar-class ferry (50 men)
- Shalimar-class ferry (250 men)

== See also ==
- Shalimar (disambiguation)
