= Weapon systems of the Indian Navy =

Defense equipment production

The Department of Defence Production of the Ministry of Defence is responsible for the indigenous production of equipment used by the Indian Navy and the other armed forces. It comprises the 41 Indian Ordnance Factories under control of the Ordnance Factories Board and eight Defence PSUs: HAL, BEL, BEML, BDL, MDL, GSL, GRSE and Midhani. The present weapon systems of the Indian Navy are:

== Guided missiles ==
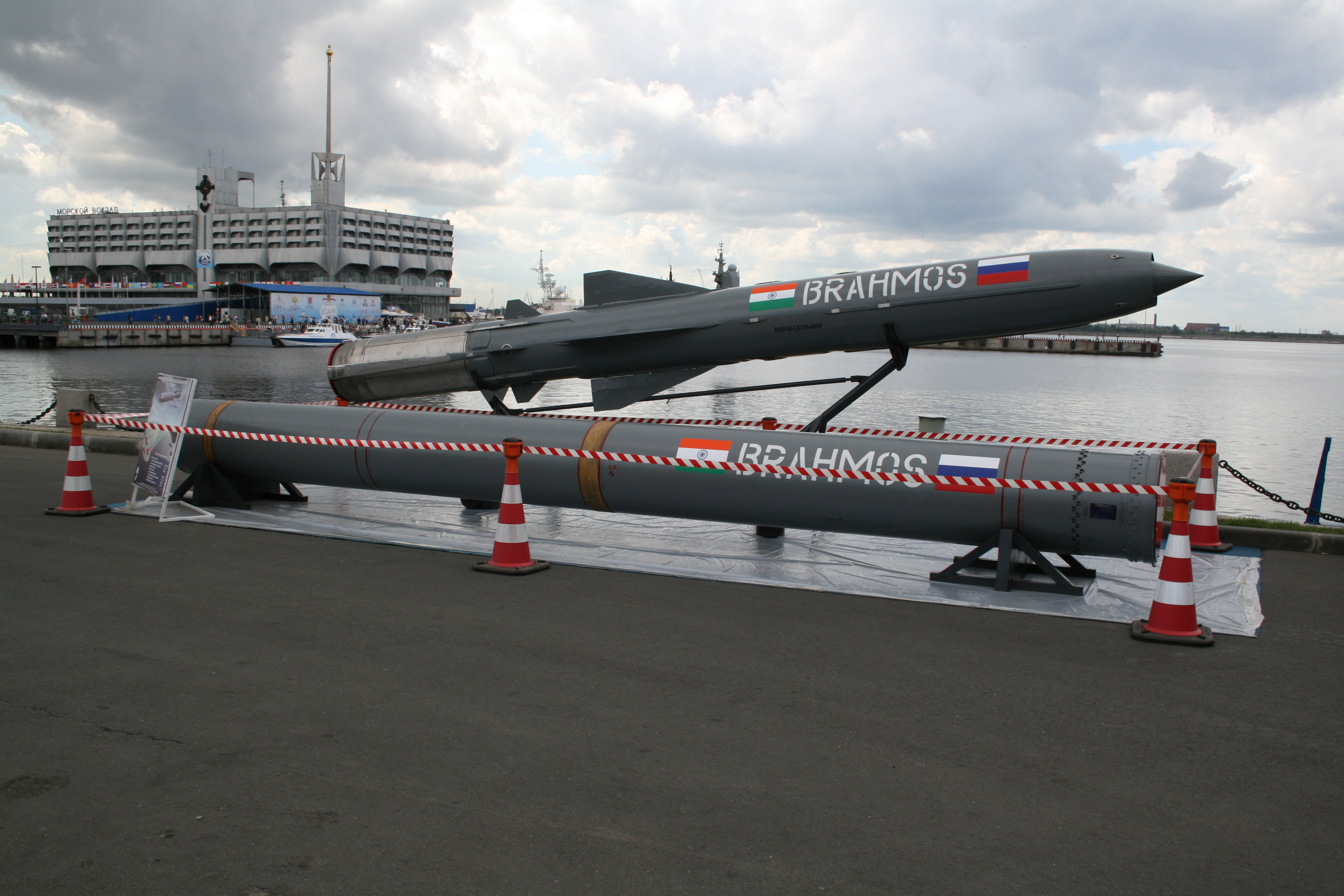
BrahMos supersonic cruise missile is the primary anti-ship missile of the Indian Navy

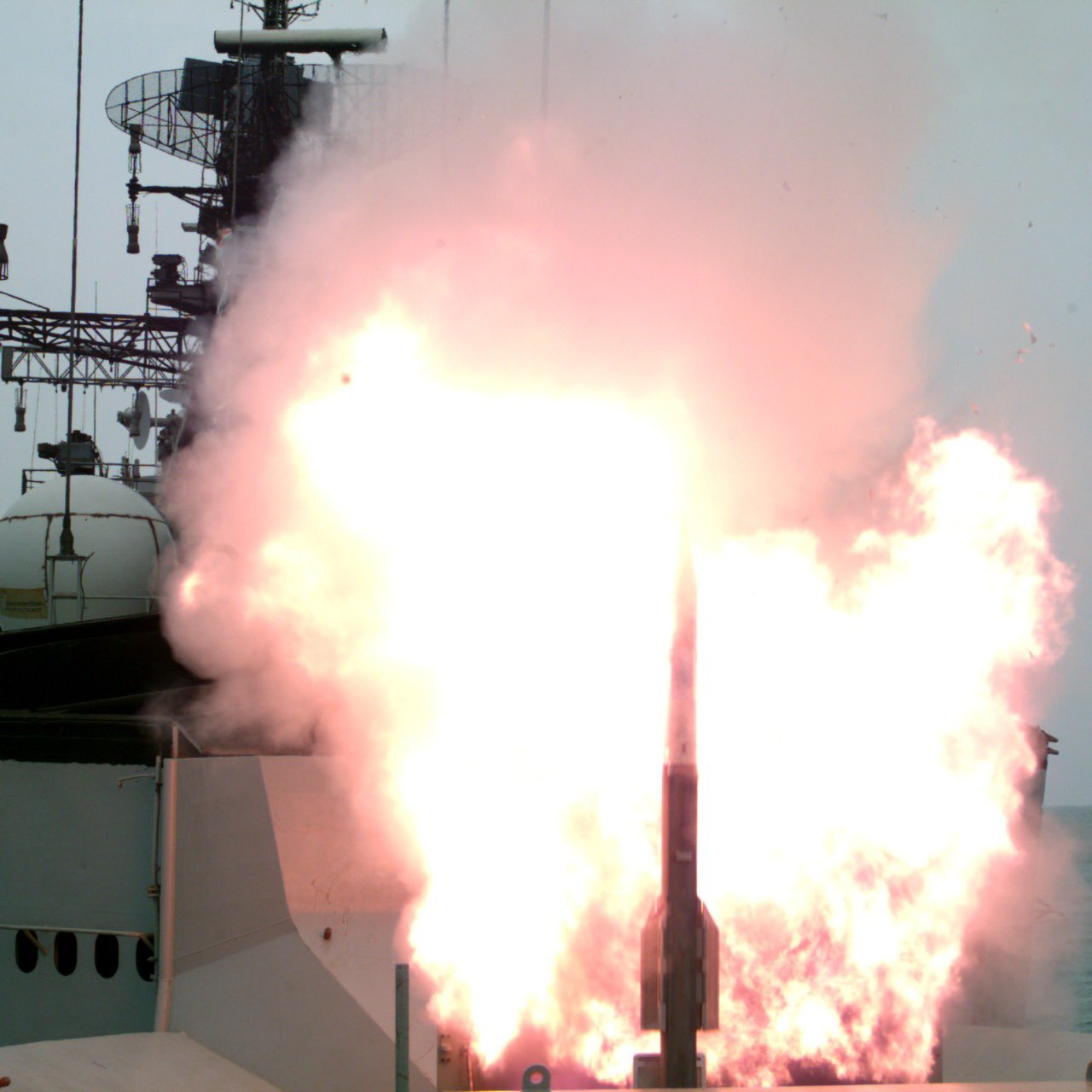
VL-SRSAM

Name	Origin	Type	Launch platforms	Notes
Submarine-launched ballistic missile
Sagarika	India	Short-range	Arihant, S5-class SSBN	
K4	India	Medium-range	Arihant, S5-class SSBN	
K-5	India	Intercontinental	Arihant, S5-class SSBN	
K-6	India	Intercontinental	S5-class SSBN	
Ship-launched ballistic missile
Dhanush	India	Short-range	INS Rajput, INS Sukanya, INS Subhadra	
LORA	Israel	Theater quasi-ballistic		
Cruise/Anti-ship missiles
BrahMos II	India/Russia	Hypersonic cruise missile		Under development
BrahMos	India/Russia	Supersonic cruise missile	Mostly all warships except (Talwar Trishul & Tabar)	Several variants: Ship-launched, Anti-ship/Land attack. Extended Range variants (ER) on order.
Klub-S/N	Russia	Supersonic cruise missile	Talwar-class frigate (Trishul, Talwar & Tabar) ,Sindhughosh-class submarine	
P-15 Termit	USSR	Anti-ship missile	Khukri and Veer-class corvettes (except INS Prabal, INS Pralaya, INS Vidyut)	
Harpoon Block II	United States	Anti-ship missile	P-8I Neptune, Shishumar-class submarine	
Kh-35E	USSR	Anti-ship missile	Brahmaputra-class frigate, Kora and Veer-class corvette (INS Prabal, INS Pralaya)	
Exocet	France	Anti-ship missile	Kalvari-class submarine	
Sea Eagle	United Kingdom	Air-launched, anti-ship missile	Tu-142, Il-38, BAe Sea Harrier (retired), Westland Sea King	
Rampage	Israel	Air-launched, anti-ship missile	Mikoyan MiG-29K	
NASM-SR	India	Air-launched, anti-ship missile	Westland Sea King, MH-60R, HAL Dhruv	Under development
NASM-MR	India	Air-launched, anti-ship missile	Warships, HAL Tejas, HAL TEDBF	Under development
Air-to-air missile
R-73	USSR	Short range	Mikoyan MiG-29K	
R-77	USSR	Long range	Mikoyan MiG-29K	
Astra Mk 1	India	Long range	Mikoyan MiG-29K, HAL TEDBF (future)	
Astra Mk 2	India	Long range	Mikoyan MiG-29K, HAL TEDBF (future)	Under development
Astra Mk 3	India	Long range	Mikoyan MiG-29K, HAL TEDBF (future)	Under development
Surface-to-air missile
Barak 8	India/Israel	Long range	INS Vikrant aircraft carrier; Visakhapatnam and Kolkata-class destroyers; Niligiri-class frigate	
VL-SRSAM	India	Short range	INS Rana destroyer, Kamorta-class corvette (planned)	To replace Barak 1.
Shtil-1	USSR	Short range	Delhi-class destroyer; Shivalik, Talwar-class frigates	
Barak 1	Israel	Short range	INS Vikramaditya aircraft carrier; Delhi, Rajput (INS Ranvir and INS Ranvijay)-class destroyer; Shivalik, Brahmaputra-class frigates	
S-125M	USSR	Short range	Rajput (INS Rana, INS Ranvir and INS Ranvijay)-class destroyer	
Igla-M	USSR	Very short range	Mk. IV LCU; Talwar-class frigate; Car Nicobar-class patrol vessel; INS Aditya	(SA-N-10 Grouse)
SA-N-5	USSR	Very short range	Kora, Khukri & Veer-class corvette	

== Future missiles ==
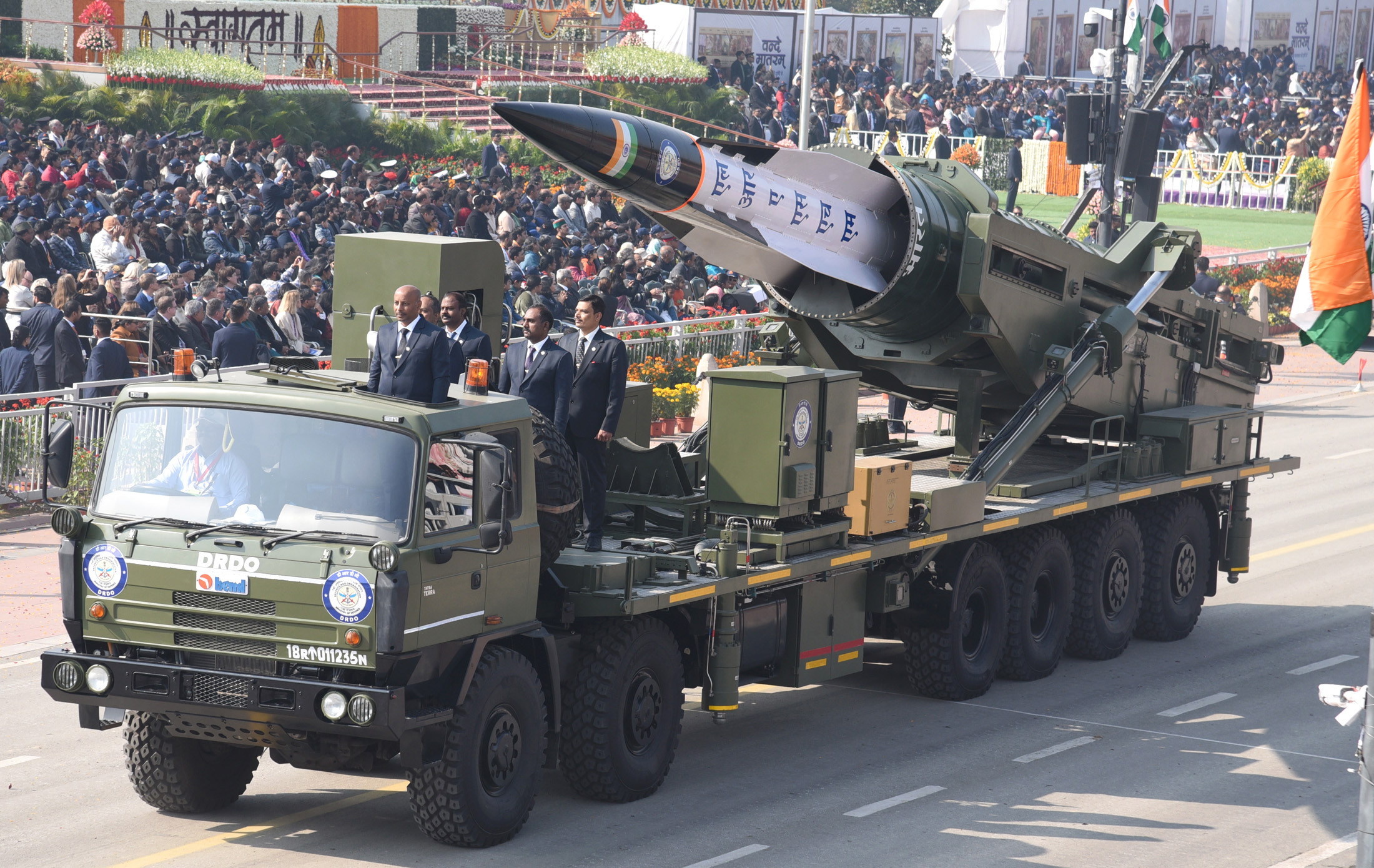
Hypersonic LRAShM in limited series production

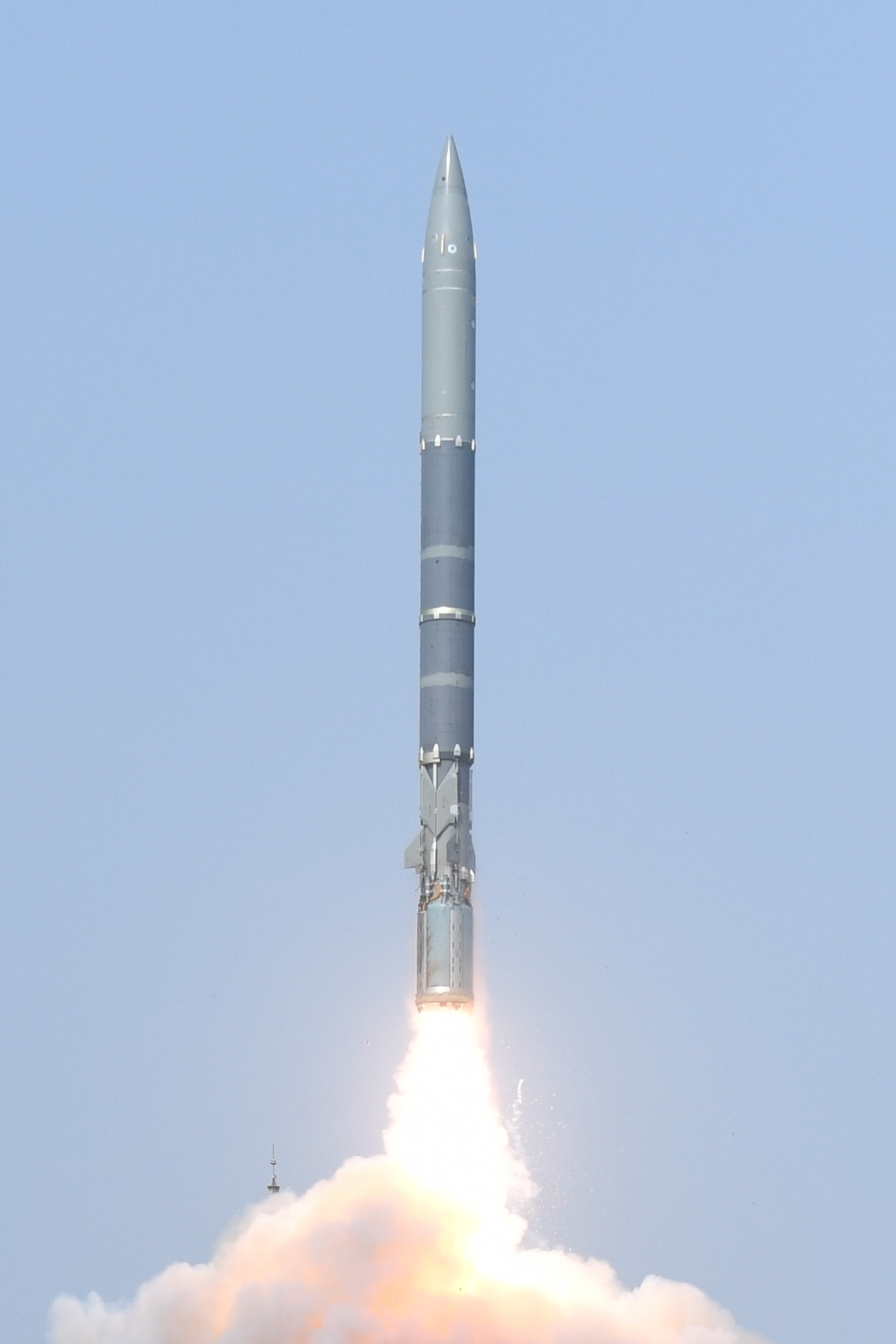
SMART, an anti-submarine missile, undergoing firing trials from the Integrated Test Range.

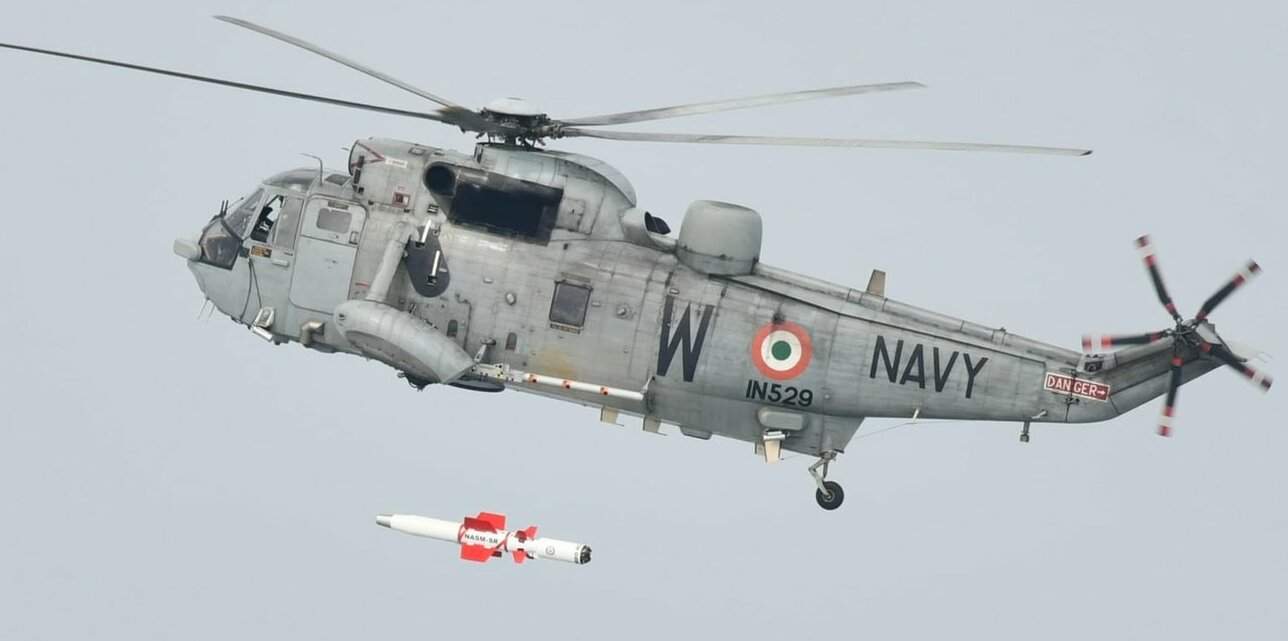
An NASM-SR, a short-ranged anti-ship missile, being launched from a Westland Sea King

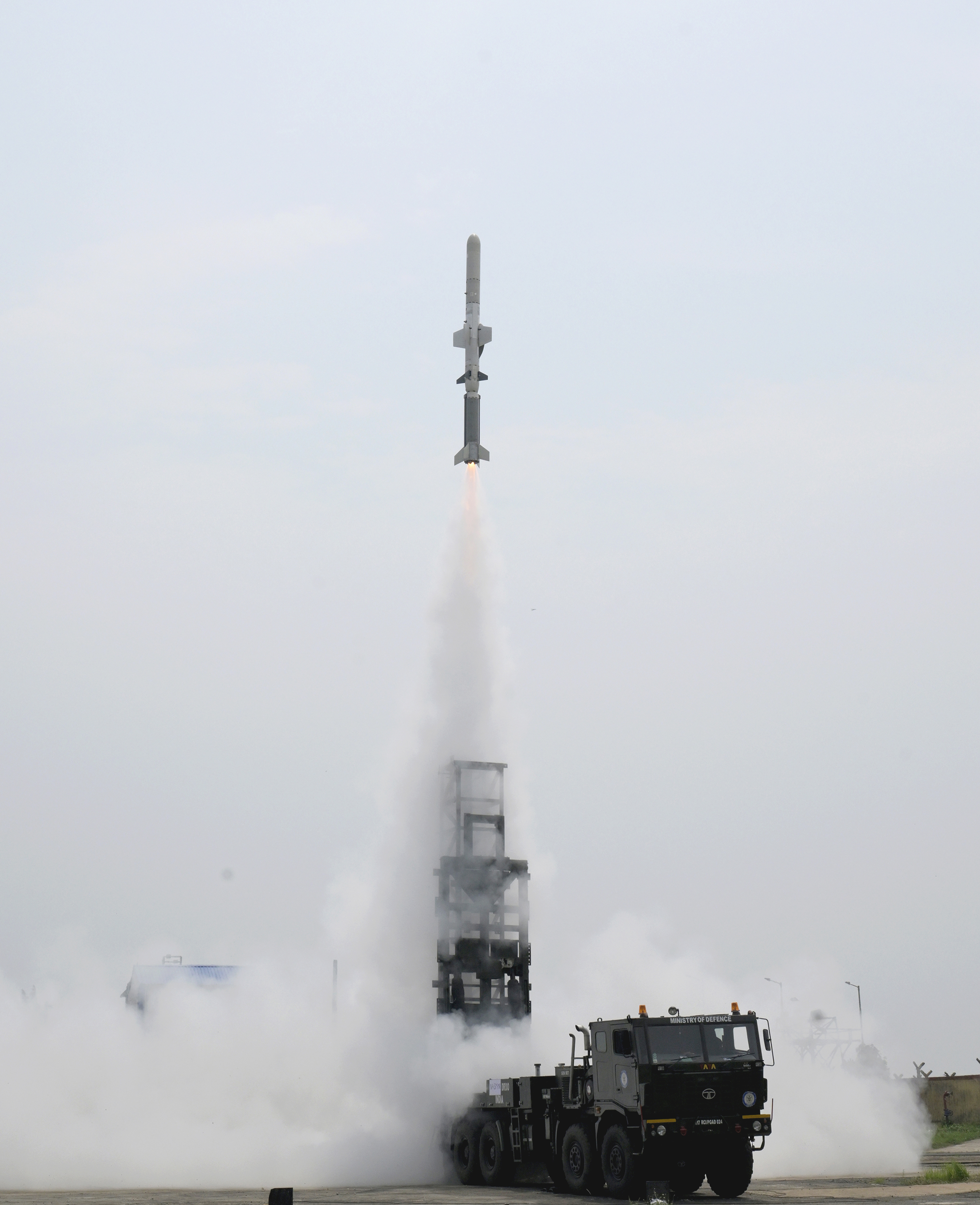
NASM-MR, a medium-ranged anti-ship missile, launched from Tata LPTA 3138 8×8 HMV

== Torpedoes ==
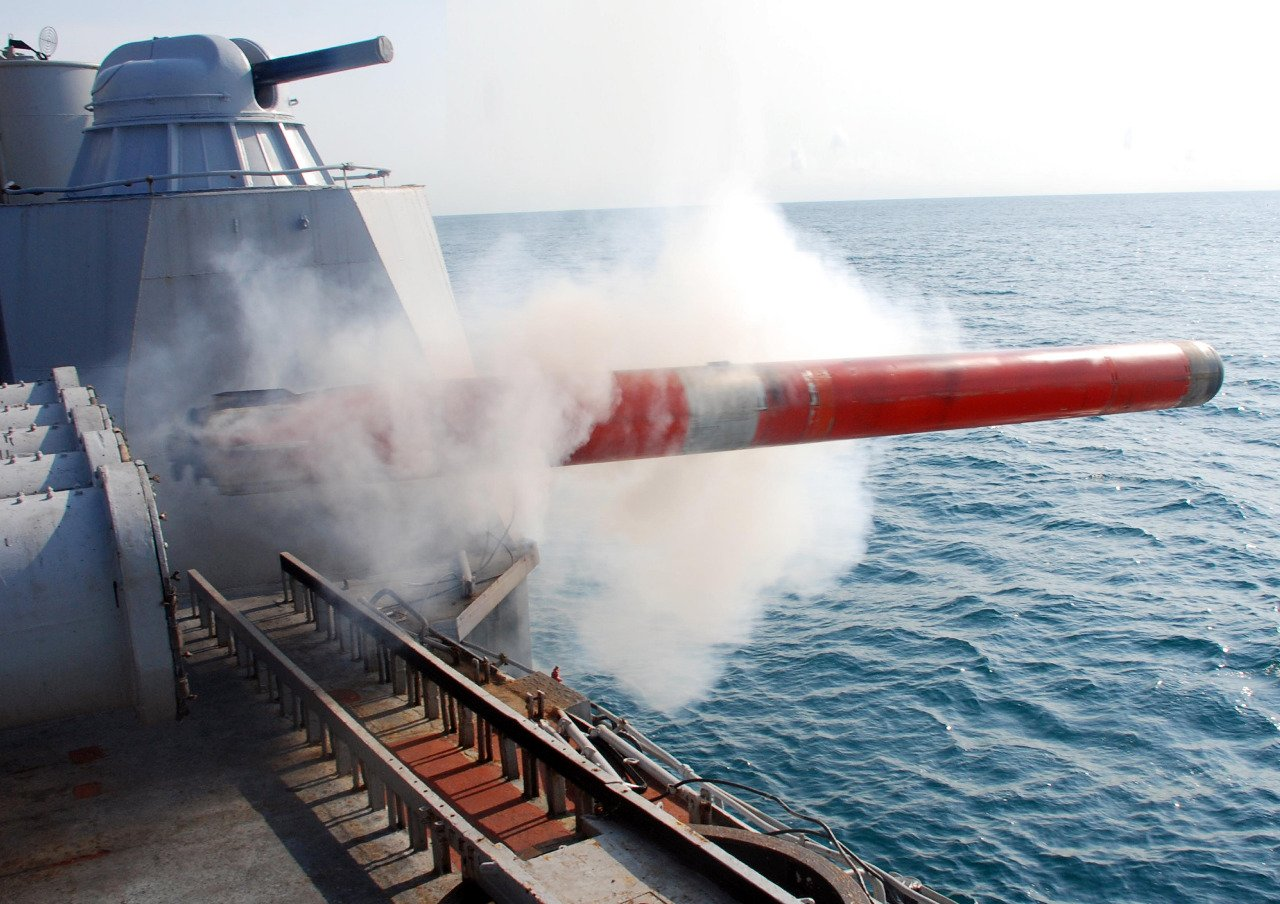
Varunastra advanced heavyweight torpedo of the Indian Navy.

Name	Origin	Type	Wake homing	Launch Platforms	Notes
Whitehead A244-S	Italy	Lightweight; ASW			
APR-3E	Russia	Lightweight; ASW		Tu-142 (retired), Il-38 (retired), Ka-28	
Type 53-65KE	Soviet Union	Heavyweight; ASuW	Passive	Sindhughosh-class submarine; Rajput, Delhi-class destroyers	
TEST 71/76	Soviet Union	Heavyweight; ASuW/ASW	Active/ Passive	Sindhughosh-class submarines	
AEG SUT 264 Mod 1	Germany	Heavyweight; ASuW/ASW	Active/ Passive	Shishumar, Kalvari-class submarines	
DM2A4 Seahake	Germany	Heavyweight; ASuW/ASW	Active/ Passive	Shishumar-class submarines	
TAL Shyena	India	Lightweight; ASW		Il-38 (retired), SMART, Surface ships, Submarines	
ALWT	India	Lightweight; ASW		P-8I	
Varunastra	India	Heavyweight; ASuW/ASW		All destroyers; Talwar, Shivalik, Nilgiri-class frigates; Kamorta-class corvettes; Sindhughosh-class submarines	
Shakti	India	Heavyweight		(Under sea trials)	
Takshak	India	Heavyweight		(Under development)	

== Naval guns ==
Name	Origin	Type	Caliber (mm)	Platforms
A-190(E)	USSR	Naval gun	100	Talwar-class frigate (except INS Trishul)
AK-100	USSR	Naval gun	100	
AK-176-M	USSR	Naval gun	76.2	Veer (except INS Prabal, INS Pralaya)-class corvettes
Oto Melara 76mm Super Raid	Italy	Naval gun	76	INS Vikrant aircraft carrier; All destroyers; INS Trishul, Shivalik, Niligiri-class frigates; Kamorta, Veer (INS Prabal, INS Pralaya)-class corvettes; Saryu-class OPV
Oto Melara 76mm	Italy	Naval gun	76	Brahmaputra-class frigate; Kora-class corvette
Bofors 60mm		Autocannon	60	
Bofors 57mm		Autocannon	57	
Bofors 40mm		Autocannon	40	Magar-class LST; Sukanya-class OPV; INS Tir; Sandhayak-class survey ship (1981)
Oerlikon 20mm		Autocannon	20	
Naval Surface Gun (30mm)		Autocannon	30	Arnala, Mahe-class corvette
CRN-91	India	Autocannon	30	Shardul-class LST, Mk. IV LCU; All patrol vessels; INS Aditya; INS Tir; Sandhayak-class survey vessel
AK-630	USSR	CIWS	30	INS Vikrant, INS Vikramaditya aircraft carriers; INS Jalashwa LPD; All destroyers; Brahmaputra, Talwar (except INS Talwar, INS Tabar), Shivalik, Niligiri-class frigates; All corvettes; Deepak-class fleet tanker; Sandhayak-class survey vessel
Kashtan	USSR	CIWS	30	INS Talwar, INS Tabar

== ASW rocket launchers ==
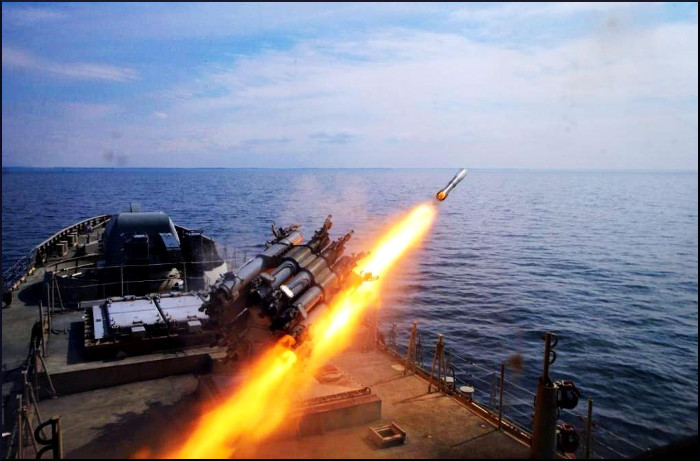
Talwar-class frigate INS Tabar firing an RBU-6000.

Name	Origin	Caliber (mm)	Platforms	Notes
RBU-6000	USSR	213	All active destroyers; Talwar, Shivalik, Niligiri-class frigates; Kamorta-class corvette	DRDO developed Extended Range Anti-Submarine Rocket (ERASR) has an enhanced of 8900 m as compared to RGB-60 rocket (5500 m).
RBU-1000	USSR	300	N/A	

== See also ==
- List of equipment of the Indian Army
- List of active Indian Navy ships
- List of active Indian military aircraft
