= Bhim-class tugboat =

Class of Indian Navy tugboats

Class overview
- Builders: Tebma Shipyard LTD, a subsidiary of Bharati Shipyard
- Operators: Indian Navy
- Built: 3
- Planned: 3
- Completed: 3
- Active: 3

General characteristics
- Type: Tugboat
- Displacement: 373 tons
- Length: 28.5 m (94 ft)
- Beam: 9.5 m (31 ft)
- Draught: 2.8 m (9.2 ft)
- Propulsion: 2 x V-12 cylinder Cummins KTA38M2 engines, each generating 1200 HP continuous duty at 1800 RPM
- Speed: 12 knots (22 km/h; 14 mph)
- Complement: 13

The Bhim class of tugboats is a class of service watercraft built by Tebma Shipyard Limited, a subsidiary of Bharati Shipyard Ltd, for the Indian Navy.

== Description ==
Each vessel is 28.5 metres long and has a beam of 9.5 metres and a draught of 2.8 metres. Each tug in the class has a capacity of 25 tonnes bollard pull. The vessel are fitted with a pair of V-12 cylinder Cummins KTA38M2 engines, each generating 1200 HP continuous duty at 1800 RPM. They are fitted with stainless steel propellers and also features Aquamaster US1201 Z-drives with 1800mm diameter nozzles. They also have two 100 kVA, 415 V, 3 Phase, 50 Hz diesel powered auxiliary generator sets. It is a follow-up order of B.C. Dutt class tugboat

== Service history ==
SRPBhim and SRP Ajral serve with the Eastern Naval Command at Vishakhapatnam, and SRP Balshil serves with the Southern Naval Command at Kochi.

External images
- Bhim Class
- INS Bhim
- INS Balshil
- INS Balshil
- 25 T BP SRP Tug(Bhim)

== Boats in the class ==
Name	Date of commission
INS Bhim	8 March 2004
INS Balshil	23 August 2004
INS Ajral	17 December 2004

== Other specifications ==
- Auxiliary power installed: 100 kW, 415 V, 3 Phase, 50 Hz diesel
- Fuel carrying capacity : 25 tons
- Water carrying capacity : 12 tons

== See also ==
- Tugboats of the Indian Navy
