= J31 =

J31, J.31 or J-31 may refer to:

== Vehicles ==
- British Aerospace Jetstream J31, a British airliner
- Nissan Teana J31, a Japanese sedan
- INS Makar (J31), a Makar-class survey ship of the Indian Navy
- Shenyang J-31, a Chinese fighter jet
- LNER Class J31, a class of British steam locomotives

== Other uses ==
- General Electric J31, an American jet engine
- Ground Equipment Facility J-31, a former radar station in California
- Malaysia Federal Route J31
- Pentagonal gyrobicupola, a Johnson solid (J_{31})
- Rhinitis
