= Shalimar-class ferry (250 men) =

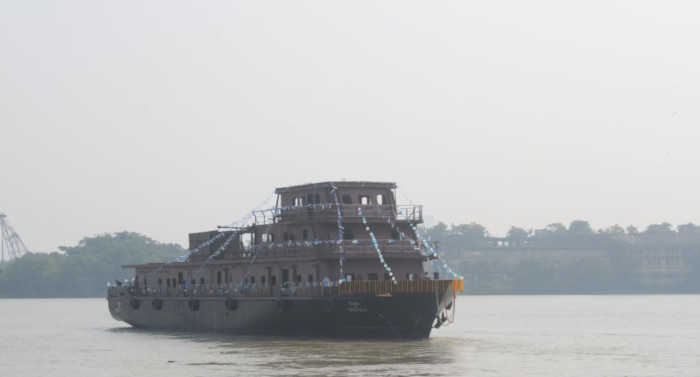
- Launch of the seventh ferry INS Manjula

Class overview
- Builders: Shalimar Works (1980) Ltd
- Operators: Indian Navy
- Preceded by: Shalimar-class ferry (50 men)
- Planned: 7
- Completed: 7
- Active: 7

General characteristics
- Displacement: 175 tonnes

Shalimar-class ferry are a series of seven service watercraft/ferry built by Shalimar Works (1980) Ltd, Kolkata for the Indian Navy.

== History ==
The ferries are designed to carry up to 250 personnel. Launched on 23 November 2022, INS Manjula, is the seventh and final vessel of this class, and was commissioned into the auxiliary fleet of the Indian Navy on 29 December 2023, at Shalimar Works Ltd., Kolkata under the Eastern Naval Command. The previous six ferries have already been delivered at the naval bases of Port Blair, Visakhapatnam and Mumbai. These ferrycraft are designed to facilitate the transport of personnel and material between Indian Naval ports and ships/submarines at anchor. The contract for the construction and delivery of the seven 250-men ferry craft with a service life of 25 years, was awarded to Shalimar Works Ltd., Kolkata; under Atmanirbhar Bharat (Self-Reliant India) initiative of the Government of India.

All major and auxiliary equipment/systems for these ferrycraft were sourced from indigenous manufacturers, showcasing the Make in India initiative of the Ministry of Defence. The delivery was witnessed by Rear Admiral Deepak Kumar Goswami, ASD (Mbi); where Commodore Indrajit Dasgupta, Warship Production Superintendent (Kolkata) was also present. Manjula ferry was launched by Binod Kumar, IAS, Principal Secretary Transport, Government of West Bengal. The induction of these ferry crafts is expected to enhance the Indian Navy's operational and logistical capabilities. The contract for the construction of seven 250 Men Ferry Craft was signed with M/s Shalimar Works Ltd, Kolkata at a cost of Rs 145.20 Crores.

== See also ==
- List of active Indian Navy ships
- Manoram class ferry
- GSL Class Ferries
