= INS Buland =

Indian Navy Tugboat

History
- Name: INS Buland
- Builder: Hindustan Shipyard Limited
- Commissioned: 15 November 2016
- Identification: MMSI number: 419000629; Callsign: AVWL
- Status: Active

General characteristics
- Type: 25 Ton Bollard Pull Tug
- Length: 35 m (115 ft)
- Beam: 10 m (33 ft)
- Draft: 2.5 m (8.2 ft)
- Speed: 12 knots (22 km/h)
- Complement: 13

INS Buland (Literally means Lofty) is a 25 tonne bollard pull tugboat built by Hindustan Shipyard for the Indian Navy. It is the third ship of the series of 25-ton bollard pull tugboats after INS Balwan and INS Sahayak that were built within 10 months and delivered in January 2016 in time for International Fleet Review 2016. After the sea trials, the ship was flagged off by Commander A.S. Mitra (retired), Director (Shipbuilding) on 15 November 2016 and joined the Indian Navy at its home port of Port Blair.

== See also ==
- Tugboats of the Indian Navy
