= B.C. Dutt-class tugboat =

External images
- B.C. Class
- INS Tarafdar
- 25 T BP SRP Tug

B.C. Dutt class of tugboats are series of service watercraft built by Tebma Shipyard Limited (a subsidiary of Bharati Shipyard Ltd), for Indian navy during 1998–99. The vessels in the class have a rated capacity of 25 ton bollard pull. The propulsion is provided by Schottel Rudder Propeller (SRP). Bhim class tugboat is a follow-up order of B.C. Dutt class tugboat.

== Vessels in the class ==
| Name | Date of commission | IMO number |
|---|---|---|
| INS B.C. Dutt | 1998 | 9177727 |
| INS Tarafdar | 1999 | 9177741 |

== Specifications ==
- Length: 28 m
- Breadth: 9.40 m
- Depth: 4 m
- Speed: 12.5 knots
- Bollard pull: 25 tonnes
- Displacement: 355 tonnes
- Draft: 1.6 m
- Output: 2 X 933 kW
- Main engines: Cummins KTA 3067 M

== See also ==
- Tugboats of the Indian Navy
