= Sahayak-class hopper barge =

Indian barge

Sahayak class
Class overview
- Operators: India
- Completed: 2
- Active: 2

General characteristics
- Type: Hopper barge

The Sahayak class of hopper barge is a pair of yardcraft built by Garden Reach Shipbuilders and Engineers Limited (GRSE), Kolkata for the Indian Navy.

Name	Commission	Homeport
Sahayak	31 December 1967	
Sevak	31 December 1967	

== See also ==
- Nikaraksha-class bucket dredger
