= INS Gaj =

Indian Navy Tugboat

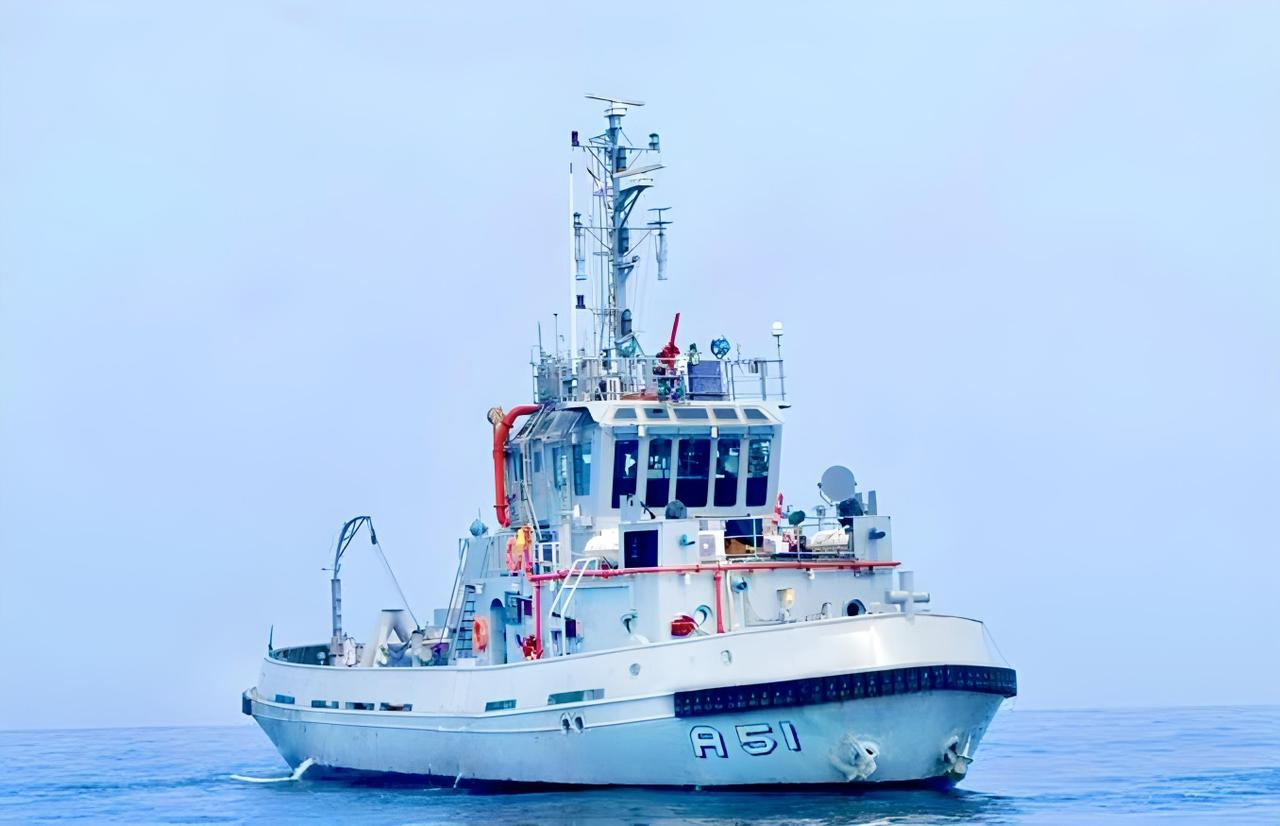
- INS Gaj A51 at sea.

History

India
- Name: Gaj
- Namesake: Elephant
- Builder: Hindustan Shipyard
- Commissioned: 10 October 2002
- Identification: IMO number: 9232333
- Status: Active

General characteristics
- Displacement: 560 long tons (570 t) standard
- Length: 34 m (111 ft 7 in) o/a
- Beam: 10 m (32 ft 10 in)
- Depth: 5 m (16 ft 5 in)
- Propulsion: 2 × Wärtsilä diesel engines, 1,421 hp (1,060 kW)
- Speed: 12 knots (22 km/h; 14 mph)
- Complement: 22

INS Gaj is an offshore tugboat built by Hindustan Shipyard Limited, Visakhapatnam for the Indian Navy. It operated under the navy's Eastern Naval Command.

== Description ==
Gaj is powered by twin Wartsila diesel engines having a power of 1421 hp (1,060 kW). The propulsion is provided by two Volth Schneider propellers which allows for a 360 degree turn on the spot. The rated bollard pull is 25 tonnes. The ship can achieve a speed in excess of 12 knots with an endurance of ten days. It is fitted with a six-tonne hydraulic deck crane and fire fighting equipment, and is also fitted with diving and salvage equipment. It has a complement of 22 sailors.

== Service history ==
It was commissioned on 10 October 2002 in Eastern Naval Command (ENC) by the Commander-in-Chief, Vice Admiral Raman Puri. The ship has been named after the previous Gaj-class tugboat, INS Gaj (Pennant number A-51) built by Garden Reach Shipbuilders & Engineers, Kolkata commissioned in September 1973.She participated at the International Fleet Review 2026 held at Visakapatanam.

== Gallery ==
Related Images
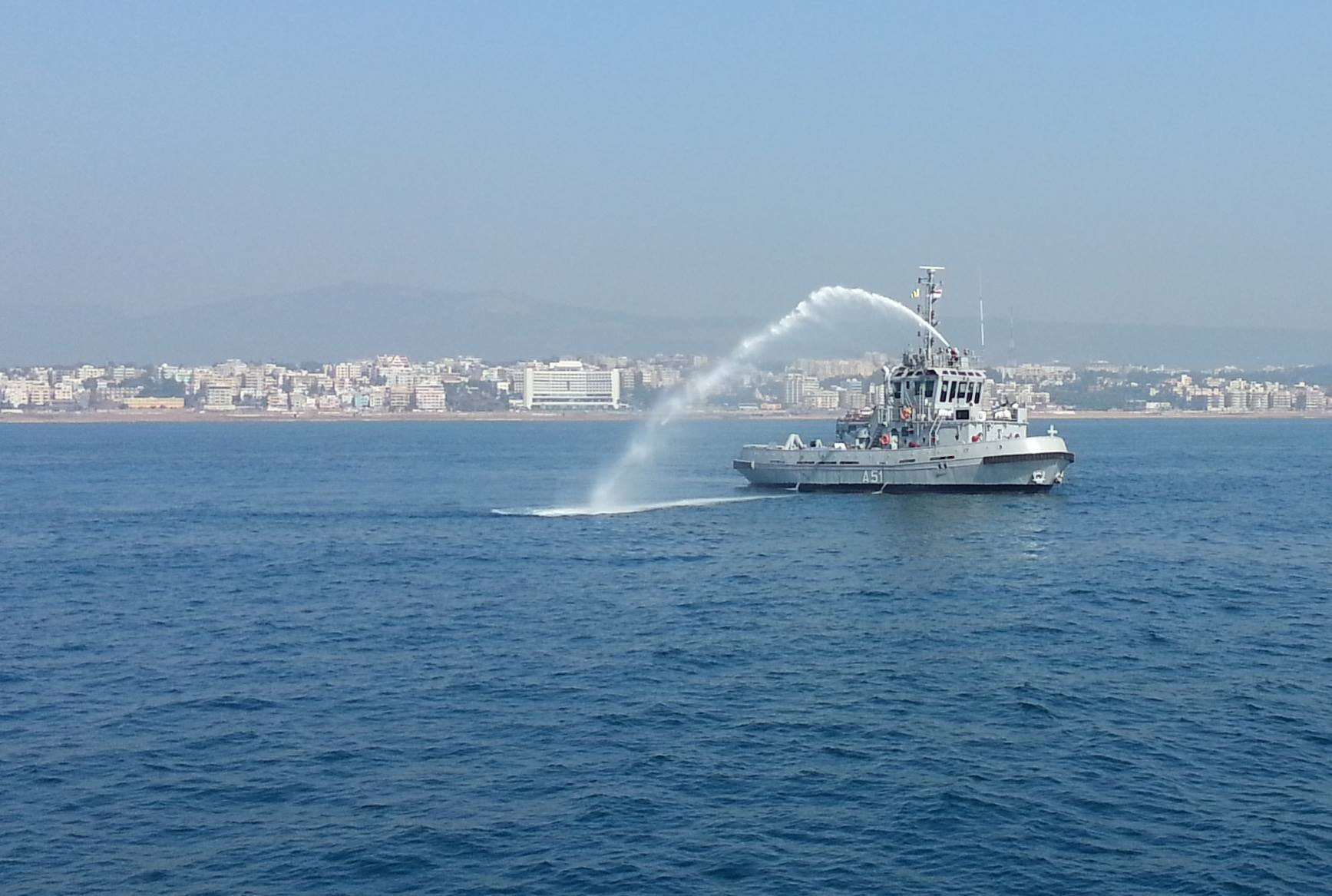
INS Gaj (A51) spouting water cannon.

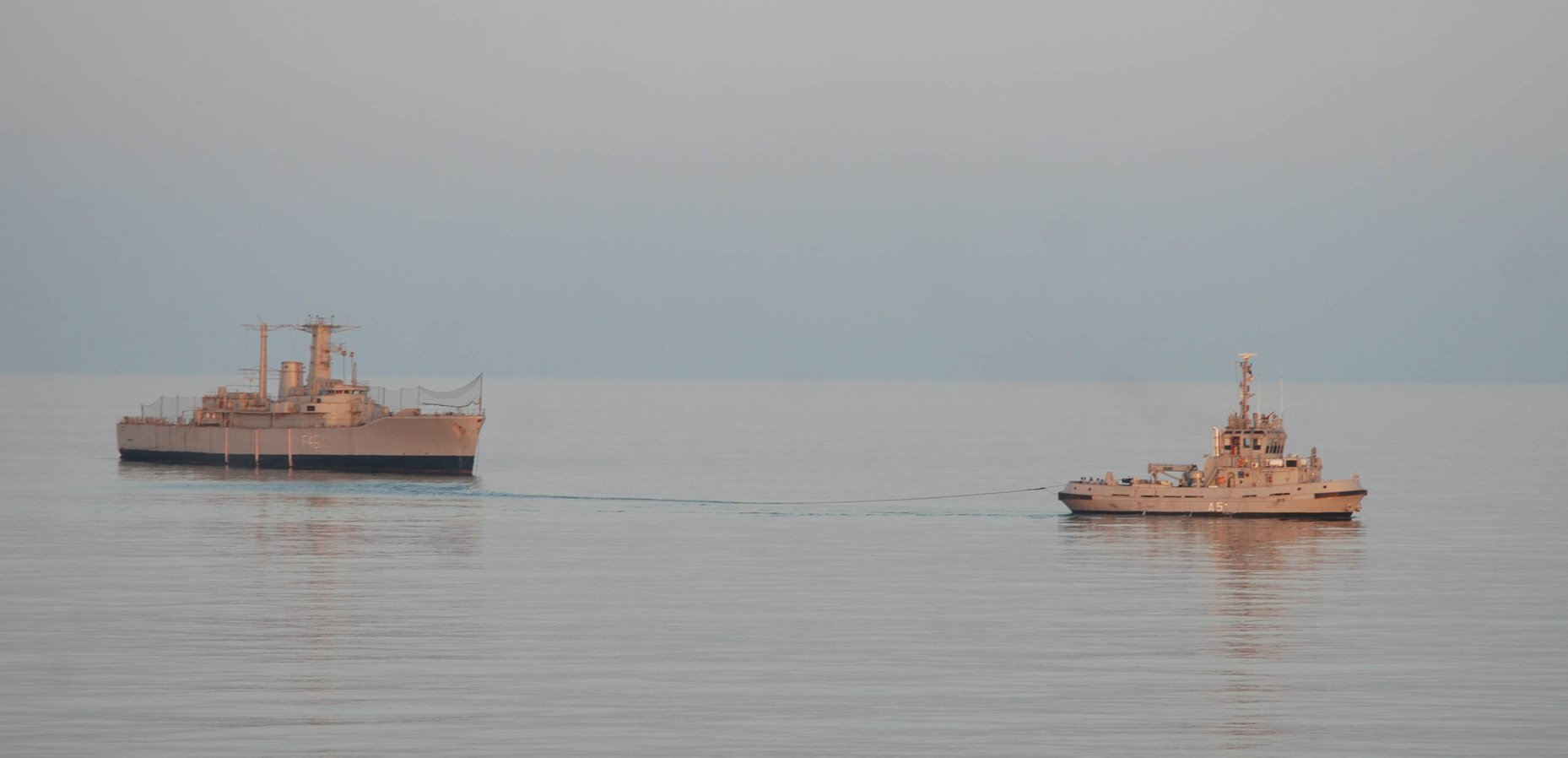
INS Gaj (A51) tugging INS Krishna (F46).

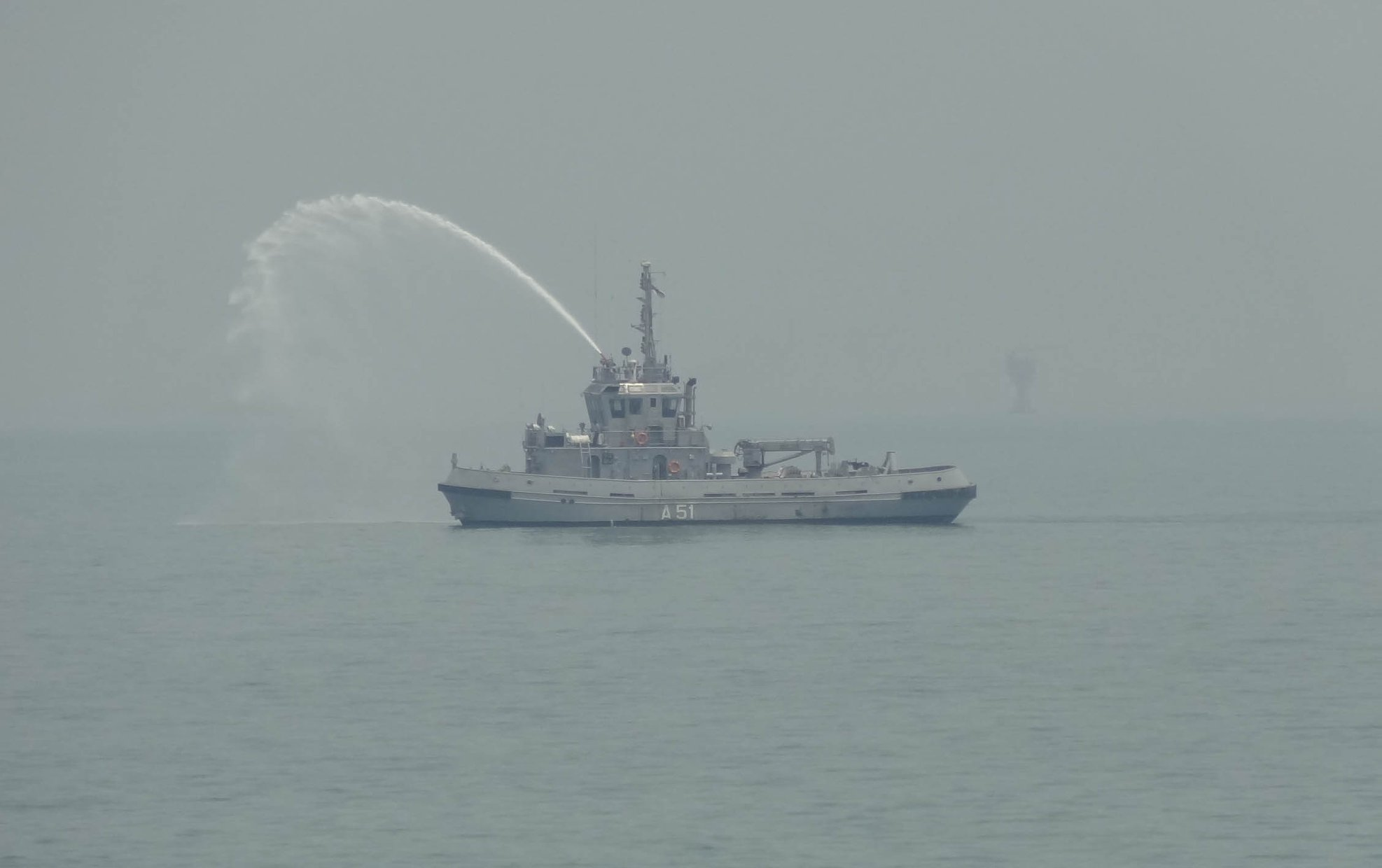
INS Gaj (A51) at sea.

== See also ==
- Tugboats of the Indian Navy
