= IRS-class tugboat =

Indian class of naval tugboats

Class overview
- Builders: Hindustan Shipyard Limited
- Operators: Indian Navy
- Built: 3
- Planned: 3 + 4
- Completed: 4
- Active: 4

General characteristics
- Type: 50T bollard pull tugboat
- Displacement: 472 tons
- Length: 34.54 m (113 ft 4 in)
- Beam: 11.26 m (36 ft 11 in)
- Draught: 4.49 m (14 ft 9 in)
- Propulsion: 2 x Wärtsilä Italia Spa Type W8L26 engines generating 2.4 MW power to drive Voith Schneider propulsion unit
- Speed: 13.5 knots (25.0 km/h; 15.5 mph)
- Complement: 13

The IRS class of tugboats are a series of Bollard pull tugboats built by Hindustan Shipyard Limited, Visakhapatnam, for the Indian Navy.

INS Sahas and INS Dhiraj tugs were flagged off by Commander (retd) K.S. Subramanian, the Director (shipbuilding) and INS Himmat was flagged off by Rear Admiral (Retd) N K Mishra, NM Chairman & Managing Director of HSL. The vessels were built under special survey of IRS Steel ship rules and as such were assigned with IRS class notation. Contracts for 4 additional similar tugboats were signed between HSL and Indian Navy in November 2019. The keel of the first two tugboats Veeran and Balaram were laid on November 15, 2019. The new tugboats are to be stationed at Visakhapatnam, the future home base of INS Vikrant to handle the aircraft carrier once it is commissioned into Indian Navy in 2022.

== Specifications ==
Each of these tugboats can achieve 13.5 knots (25.0 km/h; 15.5 mph) against a design speed of 12 knots (22 km/h; 14 mph) at 85% maximum continuous rating. Bollard pull of all the vessels is in excess of 54 tonnes almost 10% in excess of specifications.

== Service history ==
INS Himmat, INS Sahas and INS Dhiraj serve with the Western Naval Command at Karwar. These vessels are primarily meant to handle the aircraft carrier INS Vikramaditya which is based in Karwar since early 2014.

== Boats in the class ==
Name	Pennant No.	Date of Launch	Date of Commission	Homeport	Status
INS Himmat	11162	03-08-2013	31-03-2014	Karwar	Active
INS Dhiraj	11163	03-08-2013	24-12-2013	Karwar	Active
INS Sahas	11164	03-08-2013	24-12-2013	Karwar	Active
INS Veeran	11193	19-03-2020	22-10-2021	Visakhapatnam	Active
INS Balaram		19-03-2020		Visakhapatnam	

== See also ==
- Tugboats of the Indian Navy
