= Mhadei-class sailing vessels =

Sailing vessels of the Indian Navy

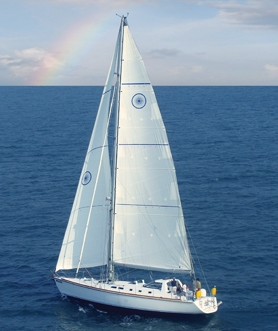
- INSV Mhadei

History

India
- Name: INSV Mhadei
- Namesake: Mhadei River
- Builder: Aquarius Shipyard Private Limited
- Commissioned: February 2009
- Identification: MMSI number: 419083100; Callsign: AUYW

General characteristics
- Displacement: 23 tons
- Length: 17.1 metres

The Mhadei class are ocean going sail training boats of the Indian Navy & include INSV Mhadei and INSV Tarini as the 2 sail boats of the class. (Note: "INSV" stands for Indian Navy sailing vessel.) On 19 May 2010 as he sailed Mhadei into Mumbai harbour, Commander Dilip Donde became the first Indian national to complete a single-handed circumnavigation under sail, in an Indian-built boat. He sailed from Mumbai on 19 August 2009 and returned to Mumbai after four stops on 19 May 2010. It was later used by Abhilash Tomy for his own single-handed, unassisted, non-stop circumnavigation under sail.

== Design and description ==
INSV Mhadei the first boat of the Mhadei class is a cruising sloop built at the Aquarius Shipyard Pvt Ltd shipyard in Divar. The vessel was handed over to the Indian Navy in February 2009 and christened INSV Mhadei, after the Mandovi River.

Mhadei was built to a stock design by van de Stadt called Tonga 56 measuring 56 feet in length and displacing 23 tons. It was decided to build a wood-core and fibreglass sandwich hull for better performance than steel or aluminium. The boat has two mainsails, two Genoa's, a stay-sail, one try-sail and two gennaker's. She is also fitted with satellite communications and electronic navigation systems.

== Service history ==
Originally built by Ottavio Tofful and Yohan Vels on the Divar Island in Goa.

After launching in Goa, Commander Donde sailed Mhadei to Colombo and Mauritius. Donde then took the boat on a circumnavigation voyage on 19 August 2009, and returned on 19 May 2010; Mhadei was the first Tonga 56 to complete a solo circumnavigation.

In 2012, Mhadei was used by Indian Navy Lt Cdr Abhilash Tomy to complete a single-handed, unassisted, non-stop circumnavigation under sail. He was the first Indian, second Asian, and 79th person to do so. Mhadei finished the journey at Kochi, after completing a voyage of 23,100 nautical miles (42,781 km).

In 2013, the navy's first all female team of sailors began preparation for another circumnavigation of the world, led by Lieutenant Commander Shweta Kapur. The crew practised in a race from Cape Town to Rio de Janeiro.

In May 2016 INSV Mhadei set sail from Goa for a voyage to Port Louis in Mauritius skippered by Lt. Cdr. Vartika Joshi, a Naval Constructor. This was the first open-ocean voyage of the Navy's all-woman crew of the Mhadei. It was a training voyage to expose the young crew to the weather that they would confront during the circumnavigation of the globe scheduled for 2017. The crew entered Port Louis, Mauritius, on Tuesday, 14 June 2016. The crew members were skipper Lieutenant Commander Vartika Joshi, a Naval architect, and five others: Lieutenant P. Swathi, Lt. Pratibha Jamwal, Lt. Vijaya Devi, Sub Lt. Payal Gupta and Lt. B. Aishwarya.

== Second Boat ==
A second boat in this class, INSV Tarini, was ordered in 2016 and commissioned into active service on 18 February 2017. She was built by Aquarius Shipyard Private Limited. The sail boat was inducted by Admiral Sunil Lanba at the INS Mandovi Boat Pool with an all women crew and is skippered by Lieutenant Commander Vartika Joshi. The vessel will be Indian Navy's first all-woman global circumnavigation vessel and the extremely challenging expedition by Tarini's all-woman crew is slated to commence in August 2017.

== Specifications ==
- Displacement: 23 tons
- Length (overall): 17.1 m
- Beam: 5 m
- Height of mast: 21 m above waterline

== See also ==
- List of active Indian Navy ships
