= Immediate Support Vessel =

Type of light and armed patrol boat of the Indian Navy

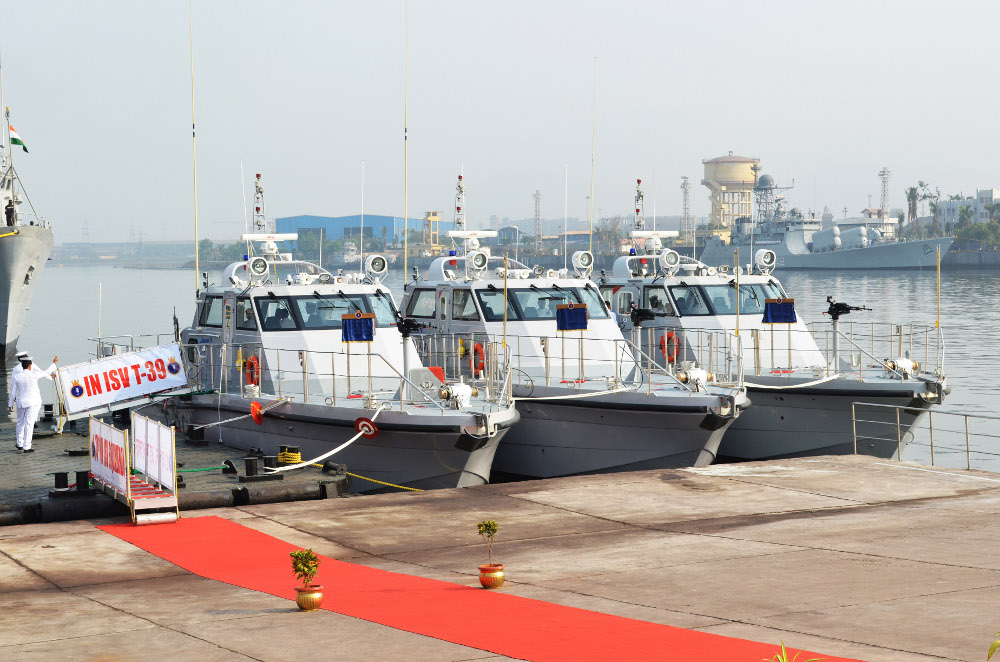
- Immediate Support Vessels T-38, T-39 & T-40 ready for commissioning

Class overview
- Builders: SHM Shipcare; Abu Dhabi Ship Builders (ADSB); Rodman 78
- Operators: Indian Navy
- In commission: 2014–
- Planned: 23
- Completed: 23
- Active: 23

General characteristics
- Type: Patrol boat
- Length: 25 m (82 ft)
- Beam: 6 m (20 ft)
- Draught: 1.25 m (4 ft 1 in)
- Installed power: 2 × 1,600 hp (1,200 kW) Caterpillar engines
- Propulsion: Water jet
- Speed: 40 knots (74 km/h; 46 mph) max; 35 knots (65 km/h; 40 mph) at full load; 15 kn (28 km/h; 17 mph)-20 kn (37 km/h; 23 mph) cruising speed
- Range: 500 nmi (930 km; 580 mi)
- Complement: 7
- Armament: Heavy and light machine guns

Immediate Support Vessel (ISV) is a type of light and armed patrol boat of the Indian Navy.

== Design and description ==
The ISVs have been designed and built by SHM Shipcare, Abu Dhabi Ship Building (ADSB) and Rodman 78 of Spain, for the patrol boat requirement of India's Oil and Natural Gas Corporation (ONGC) and the Indian Navy. and were funded by ONGC.

The ISVs are made of fiberglass reinforced hulls, and are capable of operating in sea state 6 conditions. They are fitted with two Caterpillar engines, each of 1,600 hp (1,200 kW), which enables top speed of 40 knots using water jet propulsion, and a radius of operation of 500 nautical miles. The boats are armed with heavy and light machine guns, and also carry modern navigational and communication sensors and equipment for day and night surveillance. They also carry an inflatable Gemini boat to enable rapid insertion or extraction of the Indian Navy's MARCOS for search and rescue, law enforcement and maritime patrol. The patrol boats are commanded by an officer of the rank of Lieutenant and have a crew of six sailors, and can carry a total of 20 people on board.

== Service history ==
One Immediate Support Vessel deployed at Bombay High fired at a fisherman in a boat on Sunday, May 17, 2015. The incident occurred in the Arabian Sea, around 80 km off Mumbai. The boat had strayed into the high security and prohibited area of an offshore oil rig, and anchored close to an oil platform. According to the navy's report, "despite repeated warnings, the boat refused to move out of the prohibited area, which is when the warning shots were fired into the water. One round deflected on hitting the water and hit a fisherman in a boat." He was evacuated in a helicopter and taken to a hospital, where his condition was reported to be stable.

Six vessels, from T-35 to T-40, from the 83rd and 84th squadron participated at the International Fleet Review 2026 held at Visakhapatnam.

=== Vessels ===
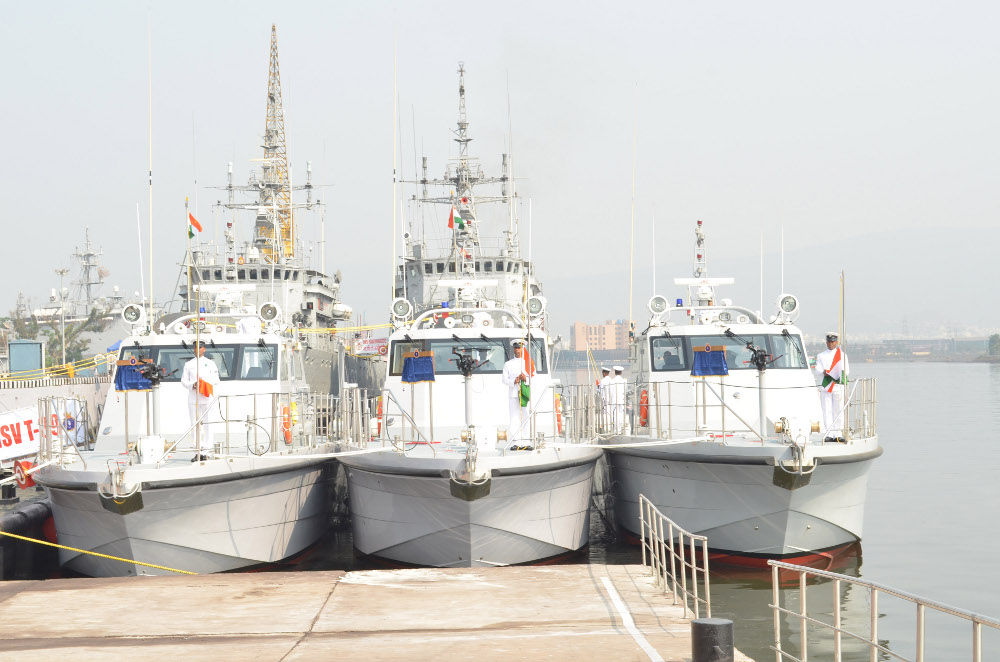
Commissioning ceremony of Immediate Support Vessels T-38, T-39 & T-40.jpg

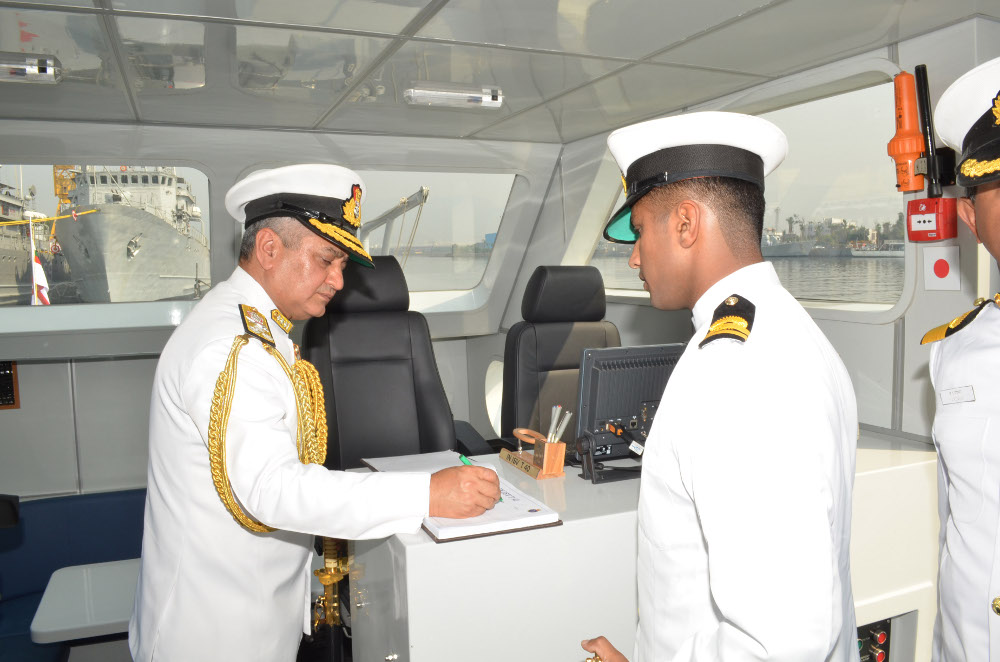
Vice Admiral Satish Soni signing the visitor's book of T-39

Seven boats were delivered to the Western Naval Command (WNC) on 30 January 2014, three boats were delivered to the Eastern Naval Command (ENC) on 5 June 2014, four boats T-26, T-27, T-28 and T-47 were commissioned into the WNC on 27 February 2015, and three boats T-38, T-39 and T-40, were commissioned into ENC on 24 March 2015.

There are currently four operational squadrons of these boats in the Indian Navy. They are the 81st ISV squadron composed of seven boats home-ported at Mumbai under the WNC, and six boats home-ported at Visakhapatnam under the ENC under the 83rd ISV squadron composed of three boats T-35, T-36 and T-37, and the 84th ISV squadron composed of three boats T-38, T-39 and T-40. Of the three initial boats of the 84th ISV squadron, two were constructed by Rodman Spain and the third one by Abu Dhabi Ship Builders (ADSB). The boats were delivered to the Navy Dockyard at Mumbai for Delivery Acceptance Trials, after which they sailed 1,200 nautical miles to Visakhapatnam in 12 days. The boats faced strong winds and high seas while crossing the Gulf of Mannar, and satisfied the navy with their seaworthiness.

The navy plans to deploy a total of 23 boats, with ENC getting nine. All boats of this class are being commanded by officers of the rank of Lieutenant. The boats T-26, T-27, T-28 and T-47 have been sponsored by the ONGC and are being manned by the navy, for the security of Mumbai and Bombay High. The boats of the 84th ISV squadron will patrol off the coast of Visakhapatnam and Kakinada.

| Unit name | Boat | Commissioning | Home port | Status | Ref. |
|---|---|---|---|---|---|
| 81st ISV squadron | T-11, T-12, T-13, T-14, T-15, T-16, T-17 | 30 January 2014 | Mumbai | Active | |
| 82nd ISV squadron | T-26, T-27, T-28 | 27 February 2015 | Mumbai | Active | |
| 82nd ISV squadron | T-44, T-45, T-46, T-47 | 22 January 2015 | Mumbai | Active | |
| 82nd ISV squadron | T-48, T-49, T-50 | 29 September 2015 | Mumbai | Active | |
| 83rd ISV squadron | T-35, T-36, T-37 | 5 June 2014 | Visakhapatnam | Active | |
| 84th ISV squadron | T-38, T-39, T-40 | 24 March 2015 | Visakhapatnam | Active | |

== See also ==
- List of active Indian Navy ships
