= INS Varuna =

Indian Naval Sail training ship

Class overview
- Operators: Indian Navy
- Planned: 1
- Active: 1

History
- Name: Varuna
- Namesake: God of the ocean
- Launched: 20 April 1981
- Status: Active

General characteristics
- Type: Sail training ship
- Tons burthen: 110 tons
- Length: 29 m
- Beam: 8.5 m
- Draught: 4 m
- Propulsion: 2 x Kirloskar Cummins Diesel (320hp each)
- Complement: Commanding Officers - 1; Officers - 5; Seamen - 6; Petty Officers - 4; Cadets - 21
- Notes: 12 sails (6 square & 6 fore and aft sails)

INS Varuna (God of the Ocean) is India's first square rig sail training vessel of the Indian Navy incidentally also in Asia. Varuna was completed in April 1981 by Mazagon Dock Limited at Mumbai. It based at Kochi under the Southern Naval Command. It was commissioned on 20 April 1981 by the Chief of the Naval Staff, Admiral RL Pereira.

== Service history ==
INS Varuna has made several goodwill visit to various countries including Australia to participate in its bicentennial celebrations in January 1988, where it participated in "Tall Ship" race from Hobart to Sydney where 250 square-rigged ships were participant.

== See also ==
- Training ships of the Indian Navy
