= INS Astradharini =

Indian naval research vessel

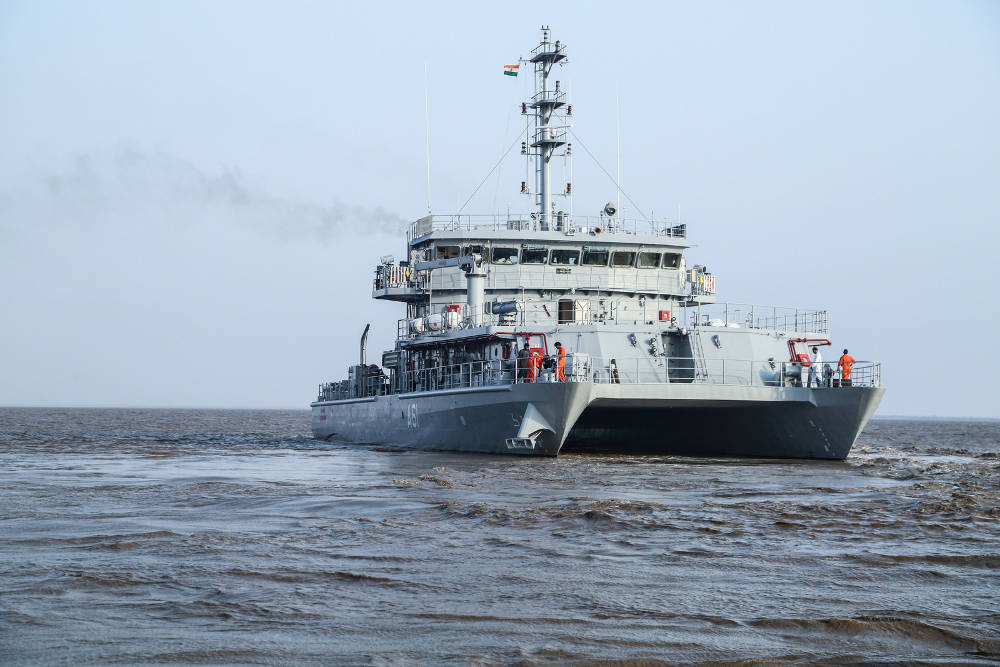
- Torpedo Launch and Recovery Vessel INS Astradharini in Visakhapatnam, 2015.

History

India
- Name: INS Astradharini
- Operator: Indian Navy
- Builder: Shoft Shipyard Pvt. Ltd
- Commissioned: 6 October 2015
- In service: 6 October 2015
- Home port: Vishakhapatnam
- Identification: Pennant number: A61
- Status: Active

General characteristics
- Type: Torpedo launch and recovery vessel
- Displacement: 650 tonnes (720 short tons)
- Length: 50 m (160 ft)
- Speed: 15 knots (28 km/h)
- Complement: 2 officers and 27 sailors and can carry 13 additional crew
- Notes: Catamaran Hull design.

INS Astradharini (from Sanskrit: अस्त्र astra, "weapon" and धारिणी dhārini, "holder"; trans. "she who wields the weapon") is an indigenously designed and built torpedo launch and recovery vessel built by Shoft Shipyard for the Indian Navy. She was commissioned into Navy Service on 6 October 2015 at the Naval Base in Visakhapatnam. After her commissioning, the ship joined the Eastern Naval Command.

== History ==
The vessel is a replacement for INS Astravahini. INS Astradharini is designed to conduct technical trials of underwater weapons and systems including torpedoes and mines. The ship has a cabin for 13 Researchers in addition to two crew members and 27 sailors.It was developed by the Naval Science and Technology Laboratory under DRDO with assistance from IIT-Kharagpur. The catamaran hulled boat can operate on high sea states and its stability makes it very suitable for carrying passengers and testing weapon systems. Hindustan Shipyards ltd conducted a refit of the ship in 2019 and 2022. She also participated at the International Fleet Review 2026 held at Visakapatanam.

== See also ==
- List of active Indian Navy ships
- INS Makar
