= INS Balshil =

Indian Navy Tugboat

History
- Name: INS Balshil
- Builder: M/s Tebma Shipyard, Chennai
- Commissioned: 23 August 2004
- Status: Active

General characteristics
- Class & type: Bhim-class tugboat
- Displacement: 25 tons
- Length: 28.5 m (94 ft)
- Beam: 9.5 m (31 ft)
- Draft: 2.8 m (9.2 ft)
- Propulsion: 2 x Cummins KTA38M2 main engines; V-12 cylinder, 2,400 hp, stainless propellers
- Speed: 12 knots (22 km/h)
- Complement: 13
- Armament: None
- Notes: Cargo capacity: 25 tons of fuel, 12 tons of water or 2 tons of lube oil

INS Balshil (Literally in Strong) is a Bhim-class tugboat currently in service with the Indian Navy. The ship was delivered to the Indian Navy ahead of schedule. INS Balshil enhances the capability of the yard in berthing bigger ships of the Indian Navy. The tugboat also has capacity to carry cargo.

== See also ==
- Tugboats of the Indian Navy
