= Amrit-class victualling barge =

Indian barge

Amrit class
Class overview
- Builders: The Peoples Engineering & Motor Works Ltd
- Operators: India
- Completed: 2

General characteristics
- Type: Victualling barge

The Amrit class of victualling barge is a pair of yardcraft built by The Peoples Engineering & Motor Works Ltd, Salkia, Howrah for the Indian Navy.

Amrit-class victualling barges
Name	Commission	Homeport
Amrit	23 May 1967	Naval Dockyard, Mumbai
Pankaj	23 May 1968	

== See also ==
- Nikaraksha-class bucket dredger
- INS Khadan
