= INS Suvarna =

Indian navy patrol vessel

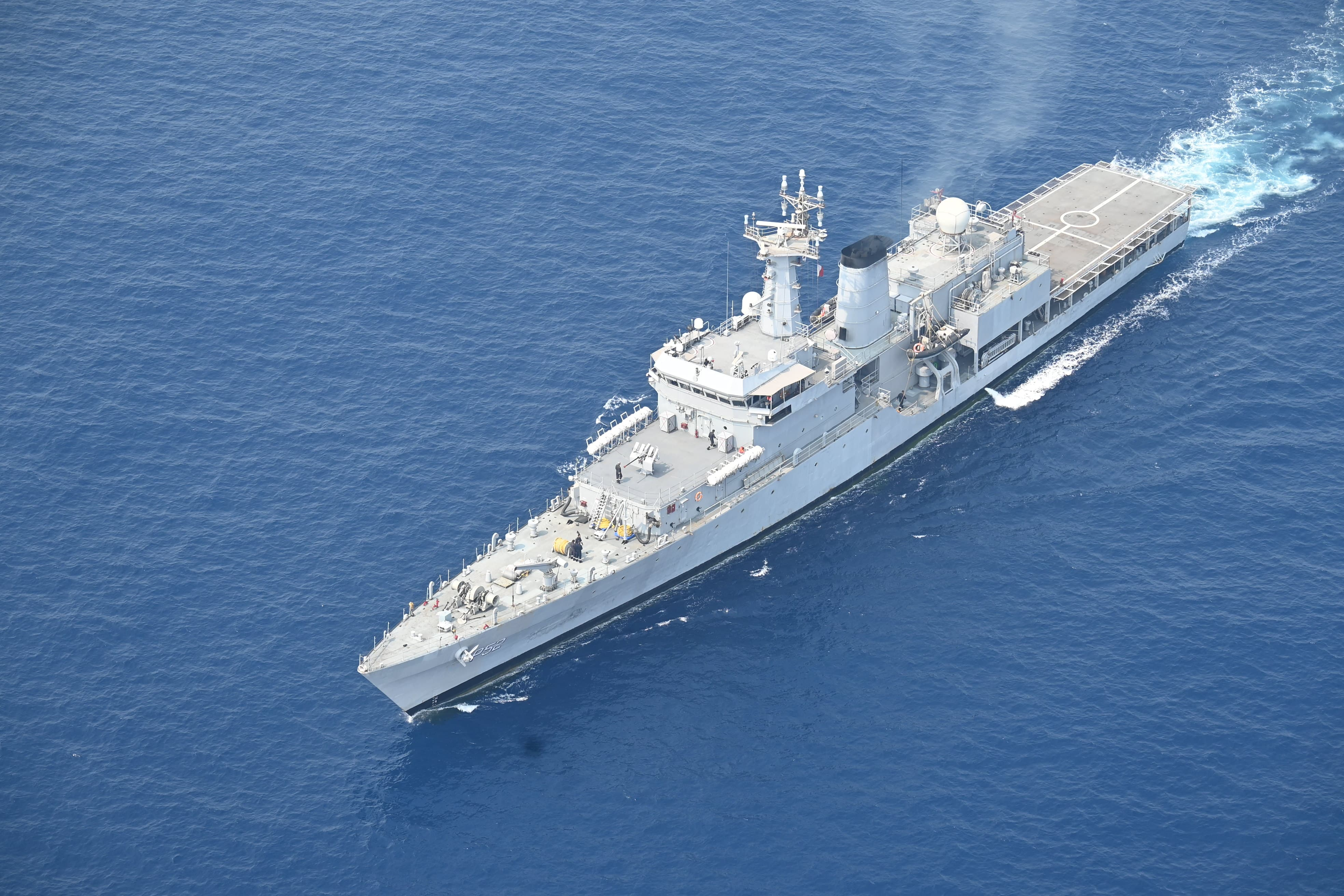
- INS Suvarna in 2025

History

India
- Name: INS Suvarna
- Launched: 22 August 1990
- Commissioned: 4 April 1991
- Status: Active

General characteristics
- Class & type: Sukanya class patrol vessel
- Displacement: 1,890 tons (full load)
- Length: 101 metres
- Beam: 11.5 metres
- Propulsion: 2 × diesel engines, 12,800 bhp (9,540 kW), 2 shafts
- Speed: 21 knots (39 km/h)
- Range: 7,000 nautical miles (13,000 km) at 15 knots (28 km/h)
- Complement: 70
- Sensors & processing systems: 1 × Racal Decca 2459 search radar; 1 BEL 1245 navigation radar
- Armament: 1 × 40 mm, 60-cal Bofors anti-aircraft gun; 2 × 12.7 mm machine guns; P51 added: 1 Dhanush ballistic missile; P55 added: 2 x 25 mm, 80-cal anti-aircraft guns
- Aircraft carried: 1 HAL Chetak

INS Suvarna (P52) is a Sukanya class patrol vessel of the Indian Navy.

INS Suvarna has been modified for use as a test bed for the launch of the ship-based Dhanush short-range ballistic missile.

On 19 April 2021, INS Suvarna, while on a surveillance patrol in the Arabian Sea, seized narcotics worth ₹3000 crore being transported on a fishing vessel.

== Gallery ==
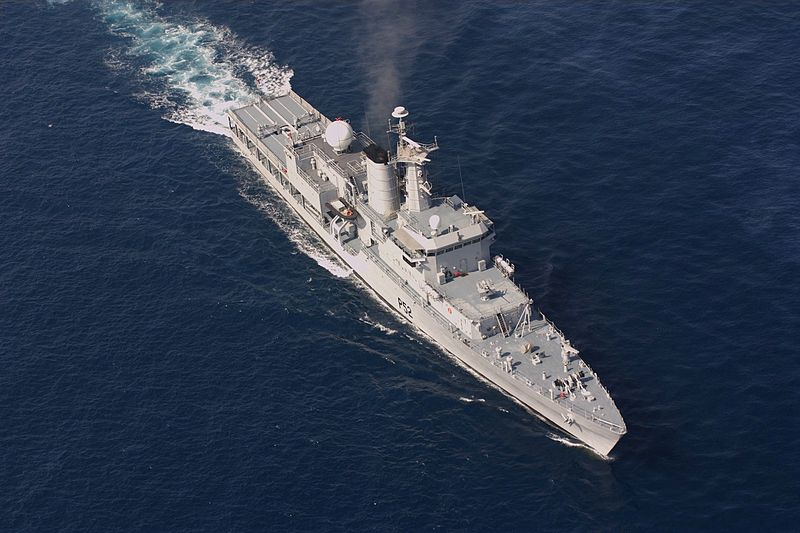
INS Suvarna (P52) in 2013 equipped with its Dhanush missile launcher on the helicopter deck
