= Corporated-class barge =

Indian barge

The Corporated class of sullage barges are a series of seven yard craft being built by M/s Corporated Shipyard Private Limited, Kolkata, for the Indian Navy.

== Description ==
The barges have a designed capacity to carry 300 tonnes of oil in six equal size tanks. Their steel cutting was started on 21 October 2009 and the keel laying of four barges was done on 30 October 2009. They have been certified and classed by Indian Register of shipping. The barges will be in service of the Western Naval Command's bases at Karwar and Mumbai. As of December 2012, construction of four barges have been completed. However, the SB-II barge was involved in an incident with the Pamban railway bridge on 13 January 2013 while being delivered to the Indian Navy's Western Command.

External image
- Corporated class sullage barge
- SB-II Barge incident

== Ships in the class ==
IRS no.	Barge name	Build date
37974	SB-I	18 July 2011
37194	SB-V	2 March 2011
39697	SB- VII	11 August 2012
41377	SB-II	18 December 2012

== Specification ==
- Gross weight: 220 tonnes
- Net weight:66 tonnes
- Dead weight:302.8 tonnes
- Displacement:468 tonnes
- Light weight:165 tonnes
- Overall length: 31.5 meters
- LBP: 29.9 meters
- Brdth: 7.9 meters
- Draught (max): 2.75 meters
- Depth Mld: 3.6 meters
