= Sukanya-class patrol vessel =

Class of Indian Navy patrol ships

Sukanya class
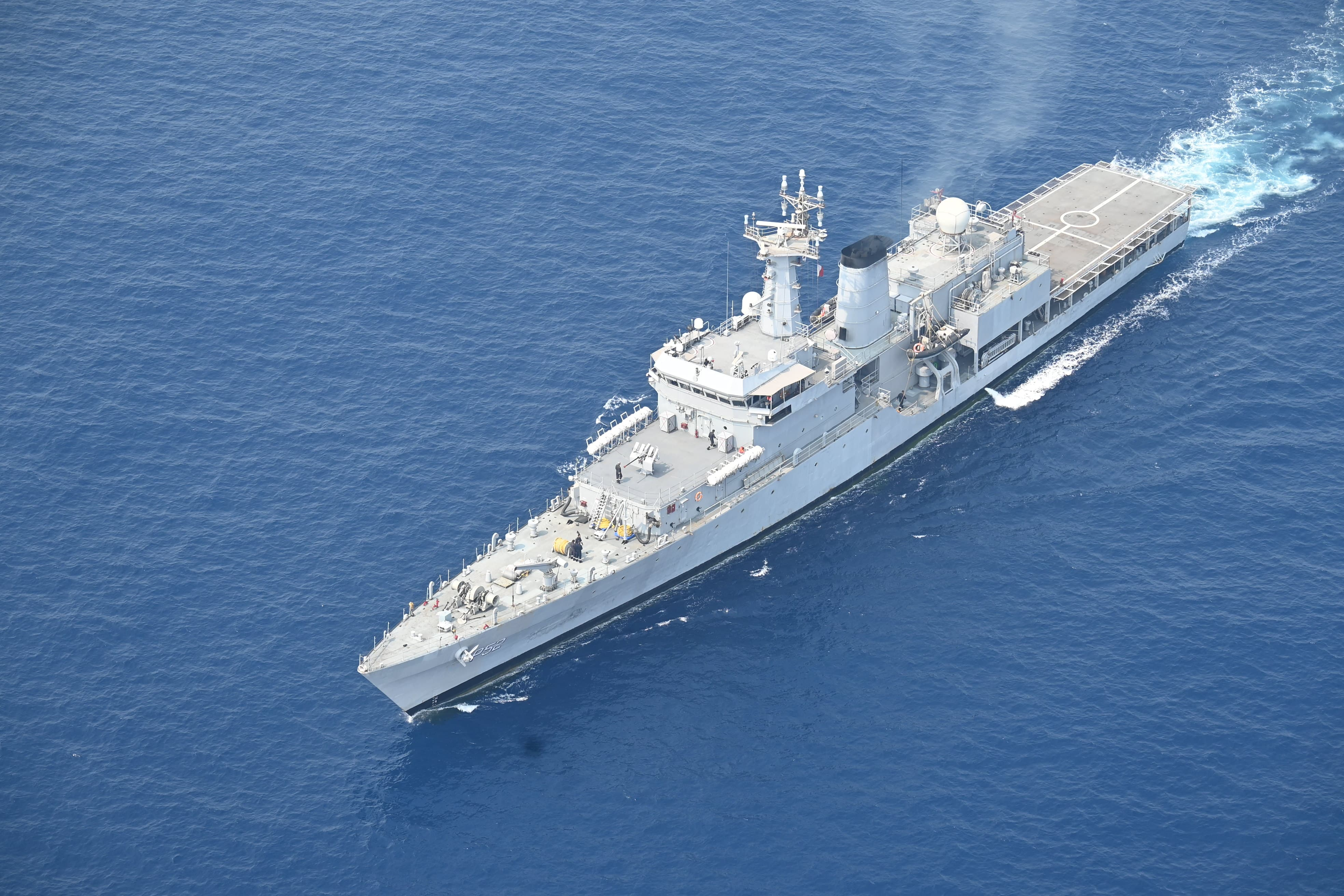

Class overview
- Builders: Korea Tacoma; Hindustan Shipyard Limited
- Operators: Indian Navy; Sri Lanka Navy
- Succeeded by: Saryu class
- Planned: 7
- Completed: 7
- Active: 7

General characteristics
- Type: Patrol vessel
- Displacement: 1,890 tons (full load)
- Length: 101.1 m (332 ft)
- Beam: 11.5 m (38 ft)
- Draught: 4.4 m (14 ft)
- Propulsion: 2 × SEMT Pielstick 16 PA6 V 280 diesel engines, 12,800 PS (9,410 kW), 2 shafts
- Speed: 21 knots (39 km/h; 24 mph)
- Range: 5,800 nmi (10,700 km; 6,700 mi) at 15 knots (28 km/h; 17 mph)
- Complement: 140 including 15 officers
- Sensors & processing systems: Racal Decca 2459 I-band surface search radar; BEL 1245 I-band navigation radar
- Armament: 1 × 40 mm, 60-cal Bofors anti-aircraft gun; 4 × 12.7 mm machine guns; 1 × Dhanush ballistic missile (P51 and P52 only); P55 added: 2 x 25 mm, 80-cal anti-aircraft guns
- Aircraft carried: 1 × HAL Chetak

The Sukanya-class patrol vessels are large, offshore patrol craft in active service with the Indian Navy. Three lead ships were built by Korea Tacoma, now part of Hanjin Group. Vessels of the Sukanya class are named after notable women from Indian epics.

== Description ==
The Sukanya class have large hulls, although they are lightly armed since they are utilized primarily for offshore patrol of India's exclusive economic zone. However, they are capable of being heavily armed and upgraded to light frigates should the need arise. Two vessels of the class, Subhadra and Suvarna have been used as test beds for installation of the Dhanush ship-based ballistic missile launch system. This includes the stabilization platform for enabling the ships to launch the missiles in stormy conditions.

Sarayu was sold to Sri Lanka and renamed SLNS Sayura. She was the former flagship of the Sri Lanka Navy and obtained several remarkable naval victories against the naval branch (Sea Tigers) of the Tamil Tiger rebels.

== Ships of the class ==
Name	Pennant	Builder	Launched	Commissioned	Status
Indian Navy
Sukanya	P50	Korea Tacoma	1989	31 August 1989	Active
Subhadra	P51	Korea Tacoma	1989	25 January 1990	Active
Suvarna	P52	Korea Tacoma	22 August 1990	4 April 1991	Active
Savitri	P53	Hindustan Shipyard Limited	23 May 1989	27 November 1990	Active
Sharda	P55	Hindustan Shipyard Limited	22 August 1990	27 October 1991	Active
Sujata	P56	Hindustan Shipyard Limited	25 October 1991	3 November 1993	Active
Sri Lanka Navy
Sayura	P54	Hindustan Shipyard Limited	16 October 1989	8 October 1991	Active. Erstwhile Sarayu, sold to Sri Lanka Navy in 2000.

== Operators ==
- Indian Navy- Total 7 ships constructed in this class. One ship sold to Sri Lanka navy. 6 ships remain in active service.
- Sri Lanka Navy – 1 ship purchased from Indian navy.

== Gallery ==
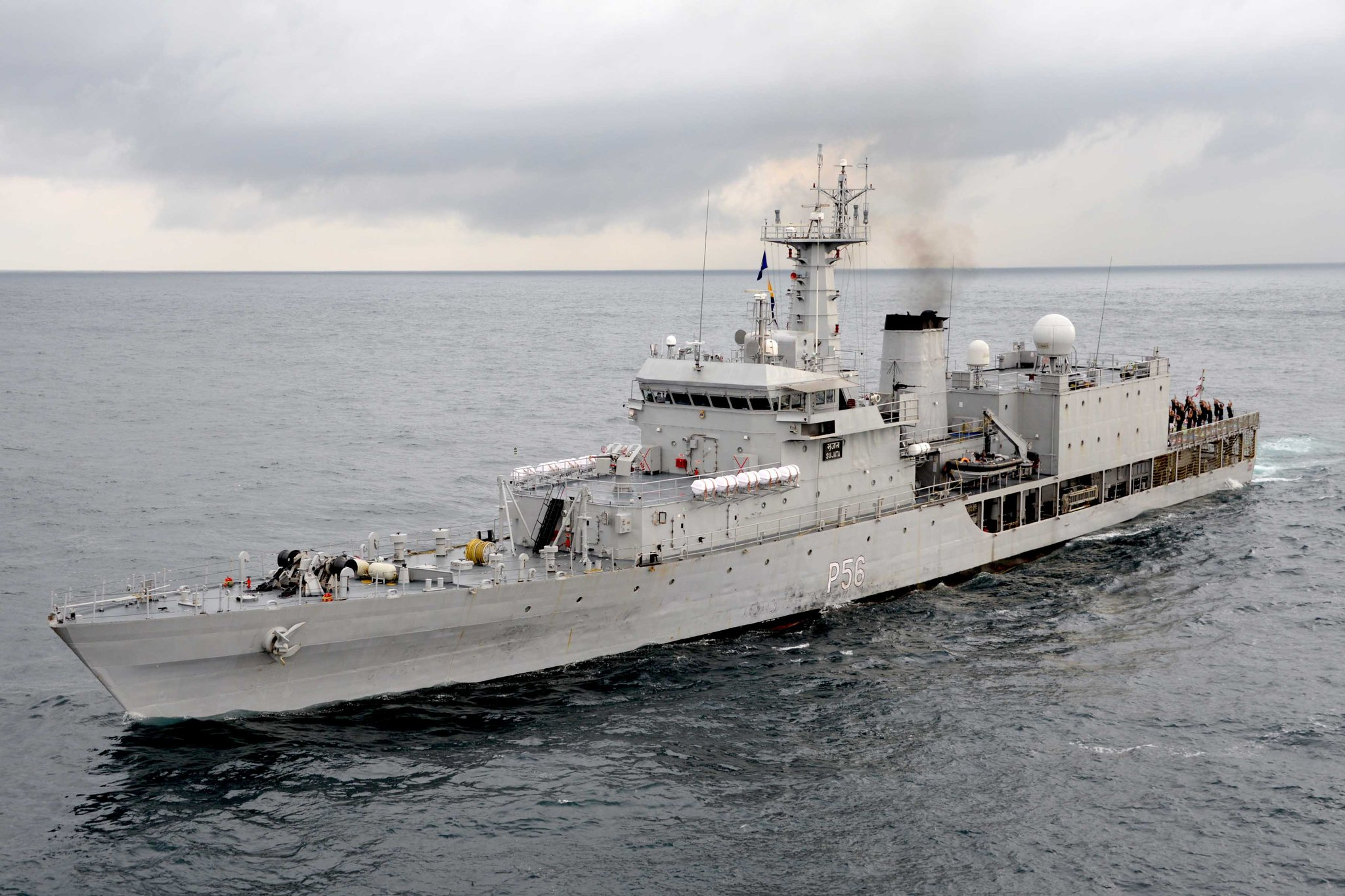
Sujata (P56) of 1st Training Squadron en-route to Sri Lanka

== See also ==
- List of active Indian Navy ships
- List of Sri Lanka Navy equipment
