= INS Khadan =

Indian dredger class

History

India
- Builder: Goa Shipyard Limited
- Yard number: 1055
- Acquired: 25 April 1975
- Commissioned: 30 April 1975

General characteristics
- Type: Grab dredger

INS Khadan is a grab dredger built by Goa Shipyard Limited (then a part of Mazagon Dock Limited) for the Indian Navy.

It was commissioned on 30 April 1975. Its yard number is 1055.

== See also ==
- Amrit-class victualling barge
- Nikaraksha-class bucket dredger
