= Shalimar-class ferry (50 men) =

Shalimar class
Class overview
- Builders: Shalimar Works (1980) Ltd
- Operators: Indian Navy
- Planned: 3
- Completed: 3
- Active: 3

General characteristics
- Displacement: 218 tonnes
- Length: 30 m (98 ft)
- Beam: 10 m (33 ft)
- Draft: 2 m (6 ft 7 in)
- Speed: 15 knots (28 km/h; 17 mph)

Shalimar-class ferry is a series of three service watercraft built by Shalimar Works (1980) Ltd, Kolkata for the Indian Navy. The catamarans can carry up to 50 personnel. Each unit in this class is of double-hull catamaran-type and are made of steel.

INS Neelam, a vessel of this class was commissioned into the auxiliary fleet of the Indian Navy on 17 May 2014, at the Naval Ship Repair Yard (NSRY) Kochi under the Southern Naval Command. The craft will be used for transportation of sailors and resources to ships at anchorage and other berths. The induction ceremony was attended by senior officers of the Southern Naval Command.

In January 2016 it was reported that Shalimar Works has already handed over three vessels with a capacity of carrying 50 personnel to the Indian Navy.

== See also ==
- List of active Indian Navy ships
- Manoram class ferry
- GSL Class Ferries
