= Nikaraksha-class bucket dredger =

Indian dredger class

Nikaraksha class
Class overview
- Builders: Mazagon Dock Limited
- Completed: 2

General characteristics
- Type: bucket dredger

The Nikaraksha class of bucket dredger is a pair of yardcraft built by Mazagon Dock Limited, Mumbai for the Indian Navy. Nikaraksha commissioned in 1967 and has a dredging capacity of 1,000 cubic yards (760 m^{3}) per hour at a 45-foot (14 m) dredging depth.

Nikaraksha-class bucket dredgers
| Name | Launch | Commission |
|---|---|---|
| Nikaraksha | | March 1967 |
| Kichodhara | 27 March 74 | 1 May 1975 |

== See also ==
- Amrit-class victualling barge
- INS Khadan
