= INS Makar =

Indian Naval Research Vessel

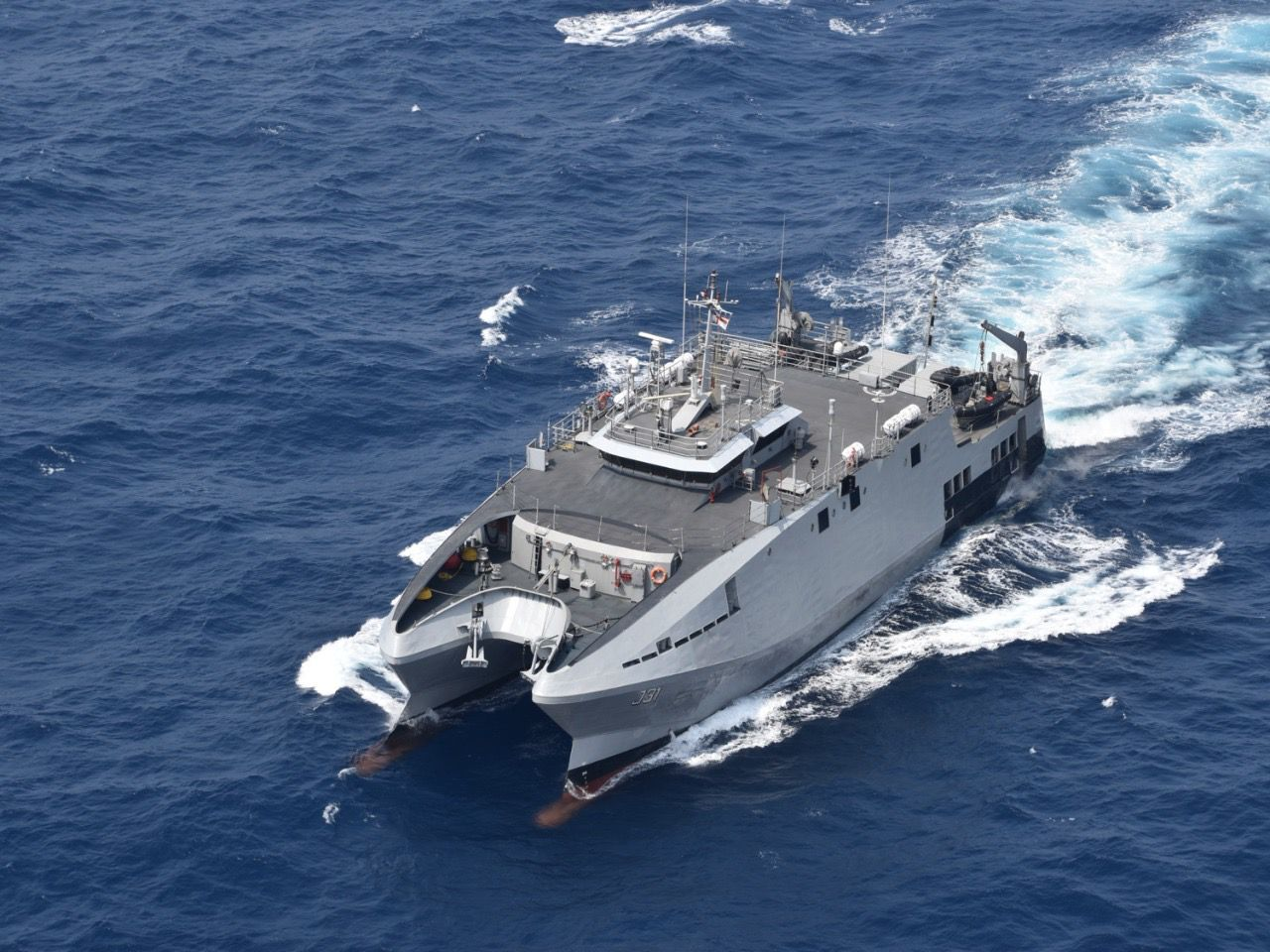
- INS Makar (J31)

History

India
- Name: INS Makar
- Namesake: Makar
- Operator: Indian Navy
- Builder: Alcock Ashdown Limited
- Laid down: 24 April 2008
- Launched: 3 February 2010
- Commissioned: 21 September 2012
- Identification: J31
- Status: Active

General characteristics
- Class & type: Makar-class survey catamaran
- Tonnage: 500 tons
- Length: 53.15 m (174.4 ft)
- Beam: 16 m (52.5 ft)
- Draught: 4.5 m (14.8 ft)
- Speed: 12 knots (22 km/h; 14 mph)
- Crew: 6 officers and 44 sailors

INS Makar (J31) (lit. 'Capricorn') is the lead ship of Makar-class of survey catamarans used for hydrographic survey by the Indian Navy. It was built indigenously in India by Alcock Ashdown Limited, Gujarat.

== Description ==
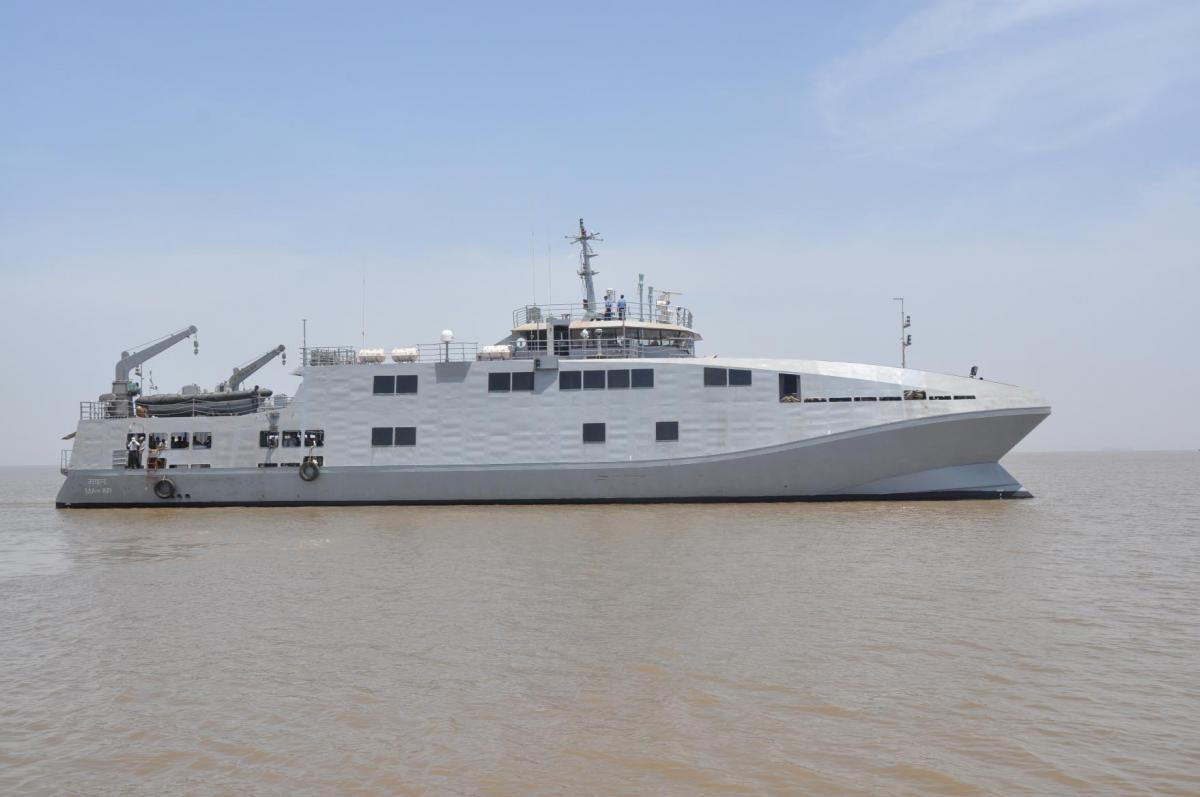
INS Makar used by INHD for surveys

INS Makar is tasked with undertaking hydrographic surveys for producing navigational charts and is capable of collecting marine environmental information by conducting limited oceanographic surveys.

Equipped with four engines and two bow thrusters, Makar has an Integrated Platform Management System that combines the vessel's power, navigation and propulsion systems. She also carries onboard survey motorboats, autonomous underwater vehicles and remotely operated vehicles for carrying out surveys. Makar is further fitted with a wide range of survey equipment that includes sounding systems, bottom profilers and an advanced electronic positioning system. Air conditioned data processing facilities are available on board Makar's caravan.

== Construction and career ==
Laid down in 2008, she was launched two years later at Bhavnagar and was commissioned into the Navy at the Seabird Naval Base, Karwar in September 2012 by the then Flag Officer Commanding-in-Chief of the Western Naval Command, Vice Admiral Shekhar Sinha. She is named after the constellation of Capricorn. In december 2021, she recovered the wreakage of the fishing boat Naved-2 which has gone missing in the Arabian sea on 23rd October that year upon request from the Maharastra government. She recovered the mortal remains of the crew who were killed during the vessel's sinking.

She participated at the International Fleet Review 2026 held at Visakapatanam.

== See also ==
- List of multihulls
- INS Astrandharini
