= IRS-class barge =

Service barge

Class overview
- Builders: Suryadipta Projects Pvt Ltd.; SECON Engineering Projects Pvt. Ltd.
- Operators: Indian Navy
- Planned: 19
- Completed: 19
- Active: 19

General characteristics
- Length: 16.5 m (54 ft 2 in)
- Beam: 6 m (19 ft 8 in)
- Height: 3.1 m (10 ft 2 in)
- Draught: 2 m (6 ft 7 in)
- Capacity: 100 tonnes (98 long tons) full load
- Crew: 7 (1 officer, 6 civilian)

The IRS-class ACTCM barge is a series of 19 ammunition barge built for the Indian Navy by two MSME shipyards. Under the project, 11 Ammunition Cum Torpedo Cum Missile (ACTCM) barges are being built by Suryadipta Projects Pvt Ltd of Thane, Maharashtra while 8 Missile Cum Ammunition (MCA) barges are being built by SECON Engineering Projects Pvt Ltd of Visakhapatnam, Andhra Pradesh. The contracts with the shipyards were signed on 5 March 2021 and 19 February 2021, respectively. The barges are either based at INS Tunir, Naval Missile Depot at Mumbai, or Naval Ammunition Depot (NAD), Karanja at Naval Dockyard (Mumbai).

The model testing of the barge during design stage was undertaken at NSTL, Visakhapatnam, Andhra Pradesh under relevant Naval Rules and Regulation of Indian Register of Shipping. The barges are being built under Atmanirbhar Bharat and Make in India initiative of the government of India. The final barge was delivered by Suryadipta Projects was delivered on 9 September 2025 and inducted in to Indian Navy on 17 October 2025. Under a separate contract Suryadipta Projects is also building 4 sullage barge for the Indian Navy.

== Description ==
IRS-class Ammunition-Cum-Torpedo-Cum-Missile (ACTCM) barge are to be inducted in the Indian Navy to undertake the mission needs for transport, embarking or disembarking of ammunition, torpedo, missile, articles, etc. on the navy ships, thereby providing impetus to operational commitments of the navy both alongside jetties and outer harbors boosting operational readiness and effectiveness. The ACTCM barges are also referred to MCA (Missile Cum Ammunition) barges, but all are designated as Large Scale Additive Manufacturing (LSAM). All major and auxiliary equipment/systems on the barge, which is set to have a service life of 30 years have been sourced from indigenous manufacturers.

Delivery of the first barge LSAM 15 (Yard 125) by Suryadipta Projects to Indian Navy was done on 9 June 2023. LSAM 7 to 14 has been built by SECON Engineering and LSAM 15 to 25 has been built by Suryadipta Projects. The barge has a cargo hold of 100 tonnes. The barge has ample facilities for fire fighting, power generation, and crew accommodation.

By October 2025, the entire consignment of eight MCA barges and eleven ACTCM barges have been delivered and inducted in to service. The last of the barges by Suryadipta Projects was launched on 9 September 2025 after a gap of 6 months. The final barge was delivered by Suryadipta Projects and inducted in to Indian Navy on 17 October 2025.

== List of units ==
Pennant Number	Builder	Yard No.	Launched	Delivered	Base
LSAM 7	SECON Engineering Projects (under MCA barge project)	75	24 February 2023	18 July 2023	INS Tunir, (Note: Naval missile depot) Mumbai
LSAM 8	SECON Engineering Projects (under MCA barge project)	76	18 August 2023	19 October 2023	NAD (Note: Naval Armament Depot) Karanja, Mumbai
LSAM 9	SECON Engineering Projects (under MCA barge project)	77	23 September 2023	22 November 2023	INS Tunir, (Note: Naval missile depot) Mumbai
LSAM 10	SECON Engineering Projects (under MCA barge project)	78	20 November 2023	28 December 2023	NAD (Note: Naval Armament Depot) Karanja, Mumbai
LSAM 11	SECON Engineering Projects (under MCA barge project)	79	14 February 2025	March 7, 2025	INS Tunir, (Note: Naval missile depot) Mumbai
LSAM 12	SECON Engineering Projects (under MCA barge project)	80	10 October 2024	22 November 2024	NAD (Note: Naval Armament Depot) Karanja, Mumbai
LSAM 13	SECON Engineering Projects (under MCA barge project)	81	10 June 2024	26 September 2024	INS Tunir, (Note: Naval missile depot) Mumbai
LSAM 14	SECON Engineering Projects (under MCA barge project)	82	12 December 2024	7 January 2025	NAD (Note: Naval Armament Depot) Karanja, Mumbai
LSAM 15	Suryadipta Projects (under ACTCM barge project)	125	10 February 2023	9 June 2023	
LSAM 16	Suryadipta Projects (under ACTCM barge project)	126	20 July 2023	7 September 2023	
LSAM 17	Suryadipta Projects (under ACTCM barge project)	127	27 October 2023	30 November 2023	NAD (Note: Naval Armament Depot) Karanja, Mumbai
LSAM 18	Suryadipta Projects (under ACTCM barge project)	128	28 February 2024	29 March 2024	NAD Karanja, Mumbai
LSAM 19	Suryadipta Projects (under ACTCM barge project)	129	24 January 2024	5 March 2024	NAD Karanja, Mumbai
LSAM 20	Suryadipta Projects (under ACTCM barge project)	130	29 April 2024	29 May 2024	NAD Karanja, Mumbai
LSAM 21	Suryadipta Projects (under ACTCM barge project)	131	5 September 2024	4 October 2024	NAD Karanja, Mumbai
LSAM 22	Suryadipta Projects (under ACTCM barge project)	132	30 November 2024	6 January 2025	NAD Karanja, Mumbai
LSAM 23	Suryadipta Projects (under ACTCM barge project)	133	1 February 2025	12 March 2025	NAD Karanja, Mumbai
LSAM 24	Suryadipta Projects (under ACTCM barge project)	134	26 March 2025	22 April 2025	NAD Karanja, Mumbai
LSAM 25	Suryadipta Projects (under ACTCM barge project)	135	9 September 2025	17 October 2025	Naval Dockyard (Mumbai)

== See also ==
- INS Purak
- INS Puran
- INS Poshak
