= Shalimar Works (1980) Ltd =

Shalimar Works (1980) Ltd. is a public sector shipbuilding company of West Bengal, India. It owns a small shipyard on the right bank of the Hooghly River at Shibpur, Howrah. The origin of the shipyard can be traced back to 1885.

== Current activity and future plans ==
The shipyard can manufacture small-size ships and repair medium-size ships. Its major work in the past involved repairing ships for the Kolkata Port Trust and fabricating vessels for the Tourism department and the Union Territory of Andaman and Nicobar Islands.

In early 2012, it had orders for 15 auxiliary and service ships worth 250 crores from Indian Navy and were planned be serviced by 2018. The orders included two 500 ton barges, three 50 Men ferries and three 200 ton barges. In June 2012, the shipyard delivered its first vessel built for the Indian Navy

As of 2025, the shipyard has had capacity to process and repair 5 vessels at a time. It plans to implement a Rs 70 crore modernisation plan to develop warship building capacity and has sought the cooperation of the Kolkata Port Trust for expansion. The company is also planning to shift operations to Haldia.

=== Ships constructed ===
- INS MANGAL
- INS MANOHAR
- INS KUMTA
- INS UDUPI
- INS MOHINI
- INS NEELAM
- INS URVASHI
- INS PRODAYAK
- INS Poshak (Shalimar)
- Shalimar class ferry

== See also ==
=== Peers ===
- ABG Shipyard
- Modest Infrastructure Ltd
- Tebma Shipyard Limited
- Bharati Shipyard Limited
