= Vipul-class barge =

Indian barge

Class overview
- Builders: Vipul shipyard
- Operators: Indian Navy
- Planned: 5
- Building: 2
- Completed: 3
- Active: 3

General characteristics
- Type: Barge
- Tonnage: 598 GT 179 NT
- Displacement: 1042.634 tonnes
- Length: 50.2 m (165 ft) LOA 46.8 m (154 ft) LBP
- Draught: 2.9 m (9 ft 6 in) (max)
- Installed power: Main: Caterpillar 1,342 kW (1,800 hp); Generators: 415 V 50 Hz; 1 × 36 hp (27 kW); 2 × 86 hp (64 kW)
- Speed: 12 knots (22 km/h; 14 mph)

Vipul class of barges are a series of five self-propelled water carrier watercraft being built by Vipul shipyard, Surat for the Indian Navy.

== Description ==
They have a displacement of 1040 tonnes and are 50 metres (160 ft) long. Each vessel in the series is operated by a crew of 20. They are fitted with two engines and are capable of speed up to 12 knots. They have a capacity to carry 500 tonnes of fresh water. They are intended to serve warships at anchorage outside the harbour and elsewhere to ensure quick operational turnaround. They are being built at Magdalla port in Surat as per contract concluded in February 2006.

Barges in the class
Name	IRS no	Date of commission
INS		
INS		
INS Ambuda	35823	11 October 2010
INS Pamba	38186	29 March 2011
INS Pulakesin-1	40373	11 September 2011

== Specifications ==
- Gross weight: 598 tonnes
- Net weight: 179 tonnes
- Dead weight: 604.85 tonnes
- Displacement: 1042.634 tonnes
- Light weight: 437.784 tonnes
- Overall length: 50.2 meters
- Lbp: 46.8 meters
- Brdth Mlt: 11 meters
- Draught (max): 2.9 meters
- Depth Mld: 3.8 meters
- Engine: Caterpillar
- Power: 1342 kW
- Auxiliary generator: 1 x 36 kW, 2 x 86 kW 415 V 50 Hx AC
- Speed: 12 knots
