= Modest-class barge =

Indian barge

The Modest class of barges is a series of self-propelled fuel carrier watercraft being built by Modest Infrastructure Ltd in Bhavnagar, Gujarat, for the Indian Navy.

== Description ==
Each vessel in the series have a length of 57 metres (187 ft 0 in) with a beam of 11 metres (36 ft 1 in) and have a draught of 2.8 metres (9 ft 2 in). They have capacity to carry 500 tons of fuel and have an air conditioned wheel house. The vessels are sea-going and have all of the essential communication and navigation equipment. They have been certified by IRS with Class notation : +SUL + IY., for carriage of oil with flash point above 60 Degree.

External image
- Modest class barge
- INS Purak induction

Barges in the class
Name	IRS no	Date of commission
INS Purak	40323	11 April 2012
INS Puran	40634	

== Specification ==
- Gross weight :731 tonnes
- Net weight :220 tonnes
- Dead Weight :625.7 tonnes
- Displacement :1152.01 tonnes
- Light Weight :526.31 tonnes
- Overall Length :57.35 m
- Lbp :54.8 m
- Brdth Mlt :11 m
- Draught Max :2.825 m
- Engine Build :CUMMINS INDIA LIMITED, KOTHRUD
- Power :1044 KW
- Aux GEN :2x 112 KW 415 V 50 Hz AC
- Speed :12 knots
