= INS Ambuda =

INS Ambuda is the name of the following ships of the Indian Navy:

- INS Ambuda (1966)
- INS Ambuda (2010)
