= Ambika-class replenishment ship =

Indian barge

Class overview
- Name: Ambika class
- Builders: Hindustan Shipyard Limited
- Operators: Indian Navy
- Planned: 1
- Completed: 1
- Active: 1

History

India
- Name: Ambika
- Laid down: 9 January 1993
- Launched: 12 October 1994
- Commissioned: 23 January 1995

General characteristics
- Type: High sulphur diesel oiler
- Displacement: 1000 tons

Ambika class (Literally means Mother) is a class of Replenishment Vessel currently in service with the Indian Navy. INS Ambika is the only ship in this class.

== Ships of the class ==
Name	Pennant	Builder	Homeport	Commissioned	Status
INS Ambika			Visakhapatnam	23 Jan 1995	Active

== See also ==
- INS Purak
- INS Puran
- INS Poshak (Shalimar)
