= Hooghly-class fuel barge =

Service watercraft

The Hooghly-class of fuel barge is a series of service watercraft being built by Hooghly Dock & Port Engineers Ltd, Kolkata (HDPEL) for the Indian Navy.

== Description ==
Hooghly-class fuel barges are self-propelled auxiliary capable of replenishing LSHSD, AVCAT and other oils for ships in harbour, at anchorage and fuel depots at distant location. Each vessel in the class has a length of 67 meters with beam of 12.5 meters and depth of 4 meters. They have draught of 4 meters and have displacement of 1700 tonnes. They have a rated capacity to carry 1000 tonnes of fuel. They are able to operate up to sea state 4 and service up to sea state 6. As per a contract order of INR 96.12 crores from Indian Navy, four 1000-ton fuel barges are to be constructed, with an option for two more barges.

== Specifications ==
- Length: 67.05 m
- Beam extreme: 12.52 m
- Depth: 5.5 m
- Draught: 4 m
- Displacement: 1700 tonnes

== See also ==
- INS Purak
- INS Puran
- INS Poshak
