= Modest Infrastructure Ltd =

Shipbuilding company

Modest Infrastructure Ltd is a shipbuilding company in Bhavnagar, Gujarat, India.

Modest Infrastructure Limited established in the year 1986 as Shipping Agents and subsequently expanded its activities to develop as Ship Owners, Ship Managers, Charterers, Ship Repairers, suppliers of Bunkers/ fresh water and ship stores, to its present status as shipbuilders. It commenced Shipbuilding operations in January 2006. In August 2012 it was announced that Dempo Shipbuilding have acquired 74% in Modest Infrastructure.

== Facility ==
Its existing shipyard, Ramsar Yard, is at Ramsar in Bhavnagar, where there is a waterfront of 220 meters and a capacity for constructing vessels up to 100 meters in length and 20 meters in breadth with launching draught of 3.5 meters. Up to eight vessels can be constructed or repaired at a time. The facility is equipped to build vessels up to 6,000 tonnes deadweight (DWT). The shipyard adopts side launching facility for high utilisation of available space and restriction on width of waterway front. The yard has two drydocks, one of 80 meters x 16 meters (4.2 meters deep) with swing-out flap gate; it is being used both for new construction and repairs. Vessels with light draught of up to 2.8 meters can be taken in or taken out from dry dock.

=== GRSE–Modest Infrastructure shipyard ===
Modest Infrastructure has also acquired land (about 161,000 square meters) for a new shipyard at Bhavnagar between Ghogha and Kuda on a seafront of Ratanpar. It will accommodate the construction of vessels up to 65000 DWT with 7 meter light draught. Construction is planned for wet basin, end launching slipway, side launching pad and dry dock for new construction and repairs. The new yard is expected to be fully ready for operations by end 2013.

On 14 July 2026, it was reported that Garden Reach Shipbuilders & Engineers (GRSE) will form a joint venture with Modest Infrastructure Ltd, a subsidiary of Dempo Shipbuilding & Engineering, to develop a ₹3,000 crore (US$310 million) integrated greenfield shipyard at Ratanpar in Bhavnagar district. The proposed facility, GRSE's first shipyard outside Kolkata, will be developed in phases and is designed to construct commercial vessels with up to 45,000 tonnes deadweight (DWT). The proposed shipyard will be developed on approximately 58 hectares (140 acres) of land, of which 16.1 ha (40 acres) will be owned by Modest Infrastructure, with a waterfront about 1.4 kilometres (0.87 mi) of along the Gulf of Cambay. The shipyard would be able to construct 1 ship of 45,000 tonnes deadweight (DWT), 3 ships of 20,000 tonnes deadweight (DWT) and six offshore support vessels or platform supply vessels per year. The project could also provide repair facilities for offshore rigs, offshore support vessels and platform supply vessels.

== Products ==
Modest Infrastructure builds a range of commercial vessels. These include Tanker, Offshore Support Vessel, Self unloading Cement Carrier, Flat Top Offshore Barge. It was awarded a contract to build five self-propelled fuel carrier barge for Indian Navy which includes INS Purak (IRS No: 40323) and INS Puran (IRS No:40634) . It also built a fully automated product tanker, touted to be the first of its kind in India for an Italian Owner in 2012.

== Peers ==
- Corporated Shipyard Private Limited
- Inland Marine Works Private Limited

== See also ==
- INS Purak
- INS Pulakesin-1
- ABG Shipyard
