= Radio beacon =

Radio transmitter to identify a location for navigation aid

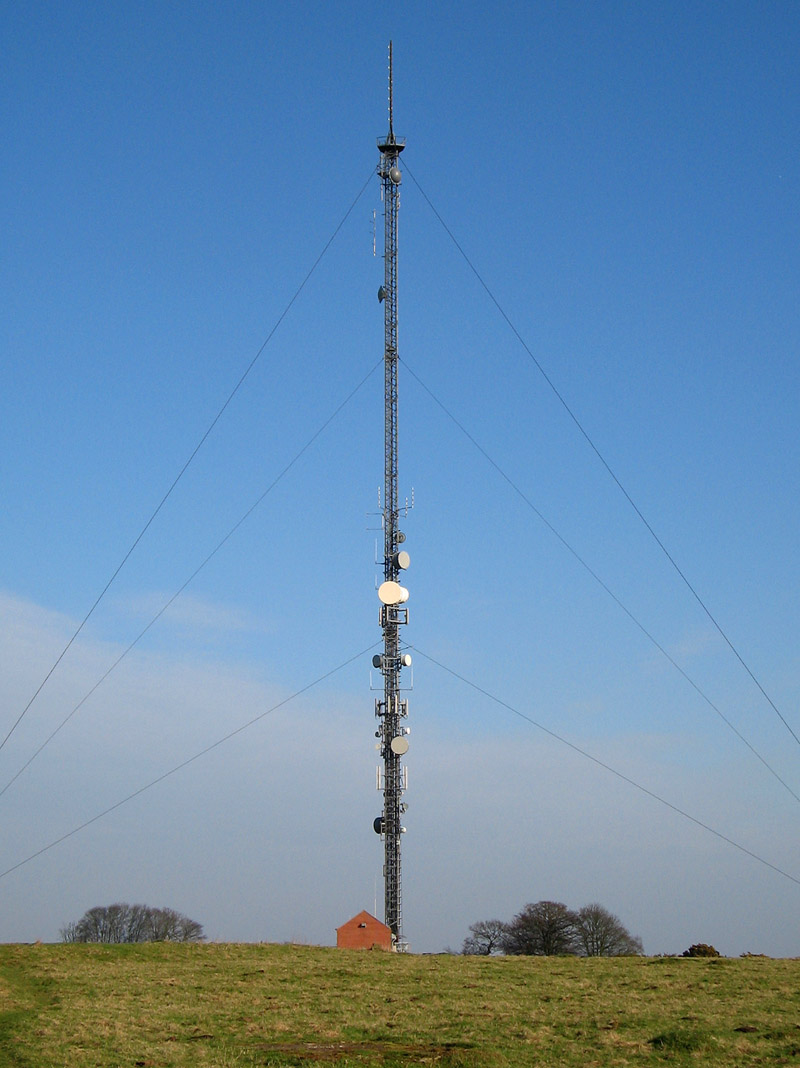
The remaining tower on Borough Hill in the UK is used as a radio beacon for aircraft navigation.

In navigation, a radio beacon or radiobeacon is a kind of beacon, a device that marks a fixed location and allows direction-finding equipment to find relative bearing. It is a fixed-position radio transmitter which radiates radio waves which are received by navigation instruments on ships, aircraft or vehicles.

The beacon transmits a continuous or periodic radio signal on a specified radio frequency containing limited information (for example, its identification or location). Occasionally, the beacon's transmission includes other information, such as telemetric or meteorological data.

Radio beacons have many applications, including air and sea navigation, propagation research, robotic mapping, radio-frequency identification (RFID), and indoor navigation, as with real-time locating systems (RTLS) like Syledis or simultaneous localization and mapping (SLAM).

== Types ==
=== Radio-navigation beacons ===
The most basic radio-navigational aid used in aviation is the non-directional beacon or NDB. It is a simple low- and medium-frequency transmitter used to locate airway intersections and airports and to conduct instrument approaches, with the use of a radio direction finder located on the aircraft. The aviation NDBs, especially the ones marking airway intersections, are gradually being decommissioned and replaced with other navigational aids based on newer technologies. Due to relatively low purchase, maintenance and calibration cost, NDBs are still used to mark locations of smaller aerodromes and important helicopter landing sites.

Marine beacons, based on the same technology and installed in coastal areas, have also been used by ships at sea. Most of them, especially in the Western world, are no longer in service, while some have been converted to telemetry transmitters for differential GPS.

Other than dedicated radio beacons, any AM, VHF, or UHF radio station at a known location can be used as a beacon with direction-finding equipment. However stations, which are part of a single-frequency network should not be used as in this case the direction of the minimum or the maximum can be different from the direction to the transmitter site.

=== ILS marker beacons ===
A marker beacon is a specialized beacon used in aviation, in conjunction with an instrument landing system (ILS), to give pilots a means to determine distance to the runway. Marker beacons transmit on the dedicated frequency of 75 MHz. This type of beacon is slowly being phased out, and most new ILS installations have no marker beacons.

=== Amateur radio propagation beacons ===
An amateur radio propagation beacon is specifically used to study the propagation of radio signals. Nearly all of them are part of the amateur radio service.

=== Single-letter high-frequency beacons ===
A group of radio beacons with single-letter identifiers ("C", "D", "M", "S", "P", etc.) transmitting in Morse code have been regularly reported on various high frequencies. There is no official information available about these transmitters, and they are not registered with the International Telecommunication Union. Some investigators suggest that some of these so-called "cluster beacons" are actually radio propagation beacons for naval use.

=== Space and satellite radio beacons ===
Beacons are also used in both geostationary and inclined-orbit satellites. Any satellite will emit one or more beacons (normally on a fixed frequency) whose purpose is twofold; as well as containing modulated station-keeping information (telemetry), the beacon locates the satellite (determines its azimuth and elevation) in the sky.

A beacon was left on the Moon by crew of Apollo 17, the last Apollo mission, transmitting FSK telemetry on 2276.0 MHz

=== Driftnet buoy radio beacons ===
Driftnet radio buoys are extensively used by fishing boats operating in open seas and oceans. They are useful for collecting long fishing lines or fishing nets, with the assistance of a radio direction finder. According to product information released by manufacturer Kato Electronics Co, Ltd., these buoys transmit on 1600–2850 kHz with a power of 4-15 W.

Some types of driftnet buoys, called "SelCall buoys", answer only when they are called by their own ships. Using this technique the buoy prevents nets and fishing gears from being carried away by other ships, while the battery power consumption remains low.

=== Distress radio beacons ===
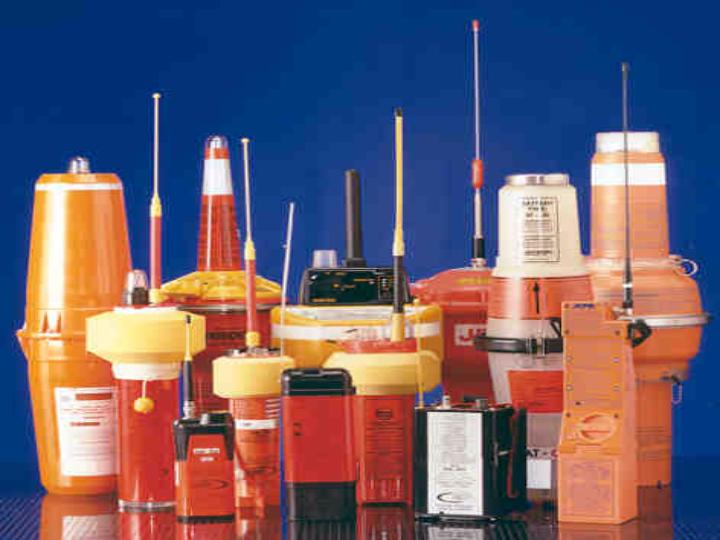
Assortment of ship emergency position-indicating radiobeacons (EPIRBs)

Distress radio beacons, also collectively known as distress beacons, emergency beacons, or simply beacons, are portable, battery-powered radio transmitters carried by ships, aircraft, hikers or cross-country skiers, used in emergencies to locate people in need of immediate rescue. In the event of an emergency, such as an aircraft crashing, ship sinking, or a hiker or skier becoming injured or lost, the transmitter is activated and begins transmitting a continuous distress radio signal, which is used by search-and-rescue teams to quickly locate the emergency and render aid. The basic purpose of distress radio beacons is to rescue people within the so-called "golden day" (the first 24 hours following a traumatic event), when the majority of survivors can still be saved.

There are three kinds of distress radio beacons:

- EPIRBs (emergency position-indicating radio beacons) signal maritime distress
- ELTs (emergency locator transmitters) signal aircraft distress
- PLBs (personal locator beacons) are for personal use and are intended to indicate a person in distress who is away from normal emergency response capabilities (i.e. 911)

The largest distress beacon system is the international Cospas-Sarsat search and rescue satellite system. Consisting of about 67 Earth-orbiting satellites carrying transponders and signal processors operated by 45 member nations, it can determine the location anywhere on Earth of a distress beacon transmitting on the Cospas-Sarsat distress frequency of 406 MHz. When it detects a beacon, the Cospas-Sarsat system calculates its location and quickly forwards the information to the local search and rescue (SAR) authorities, who find the emergency and perform the rescue. Cospas beacons also radiate a 121.5 MHz homing signal used by SAR teams with direction finding equipment to home in on the location. With first generation beacons, the satellites are able to locate the beacon with an accuracy of about 2 km (1.2 mi). However the latest generation of beacons, called emergency position-indicating radiobeacons (EPIRB or GPIRB) carry GPS and transmit their location to within about 100 meters.

=== Wi-Fi beacons ===
In the field of Wi-Fi (wireless local area networks using the IEEE 802.11b and 802.11g specification), the term beacon signifies a specific data transmission from the wireless access point (AP), which carries the SSID, the channel number and security protocols such as Wired Equivalent Privacy (WEP) or Wi-Fi Protected Access (WPA). This transmission does not contain the link layer address of another Wi-Fi device, therefore it can be received by any LAN client.

=== AX.25 packet radio beacons ===
Stations participating in packet radio networks based on the AX.25 link layer protocol also use beacon transmissions to identify themselves and broadcast brief information about operational status. The beacon transmissions use special UI or Unnumbered Information frames, which are not part of a connection and can be displayed by any station. Beacons in traditional AX.25 amateur packet radio networks contain free format information text, readable by human operators.

This mode of AX.25 operation, using a formal machine-readable beacon text specification developed by Bob Bruninga, WB4APR, became the basis of the APRS networks.

== See also ==
- iBeacon
- Non-directional beacon
- Marker beacon
- Letter beacon
- Radio direction finder
- Direction finding
- Bluetooth and Wi-Fi
- Mobile phone tracking
- Robotic mapping
- Rebecca/Eureka transponding radar
