= INS Pamba =

India barge

History

India
- Name: INS Pamba
- Namesake: Pamba River
- Builder: ABG Shipyard, Surat, Gujarat
- Commissioned: 29 March 2011
- Status: In active service

General characteristics
- Type: Water carrier barge
- Displacement: 930 t (915 long tons)
- Length: 50 m (160 ft)
- Propulsion: 2 × engines, 1,800 bhp (1,342 kW)
- Speed: 12 knots (22 km/h; 14 mph)
- Capacity: 500 tonnes of water
- Complement: 20

INS Pamba is a self-propelled water carrier barge built by Vipul Shipyard Ltd (a subsidiary of ABG Shipyard Ltd) in Surat, Gujarat for the Indian Navy.

== Description ==
The auxiliary ship is 50 metres (164 ft 1 in) long, has a displacement of 930 tonnes and has a capacity to carry 500 tonnes of water. The barge is powered by two engines with a total output of 1,800 BHP and has a top speed of 12 knots (22 km/h; 14 mph). Pamba has accommodation for 20 crew members and a galley or corridor kitchen facility. It has tank gauging systems, fire fighting equipment and carries a rigid inflatable boat. It has sea-going capability and carries all essential communication and navigation equipment.

It is named after a previous auxiliary vessel of same name which served the Indian Navy for nearly four decades and was decommissioned in April 2007. Pamba (IR no. 38186) is one of the five water barges built by Vipul Shipyard as per the contract concluded in February 2006. INS Ambuda (IR no. 35823) and INS Pulakesin-1 (IR no:40373) are her sister ships which were commissioned 11 October 2010 and 21 September 2011 respectively.

External image
- INS Pamba
- INS Pamba induction

== Commission ==
Pamba was commissioned by Commodore S. Nedunchezian, Chief Staff Officer (Technical), Southern Naval Command at South Jetty, Kochi Naval Base, on 29 March 2011.

== See also ==
- INS Purak
- Arga Class Tugboat
