= Port of Kolkata =

Port in India

Syama Prasad Mookerjee Port

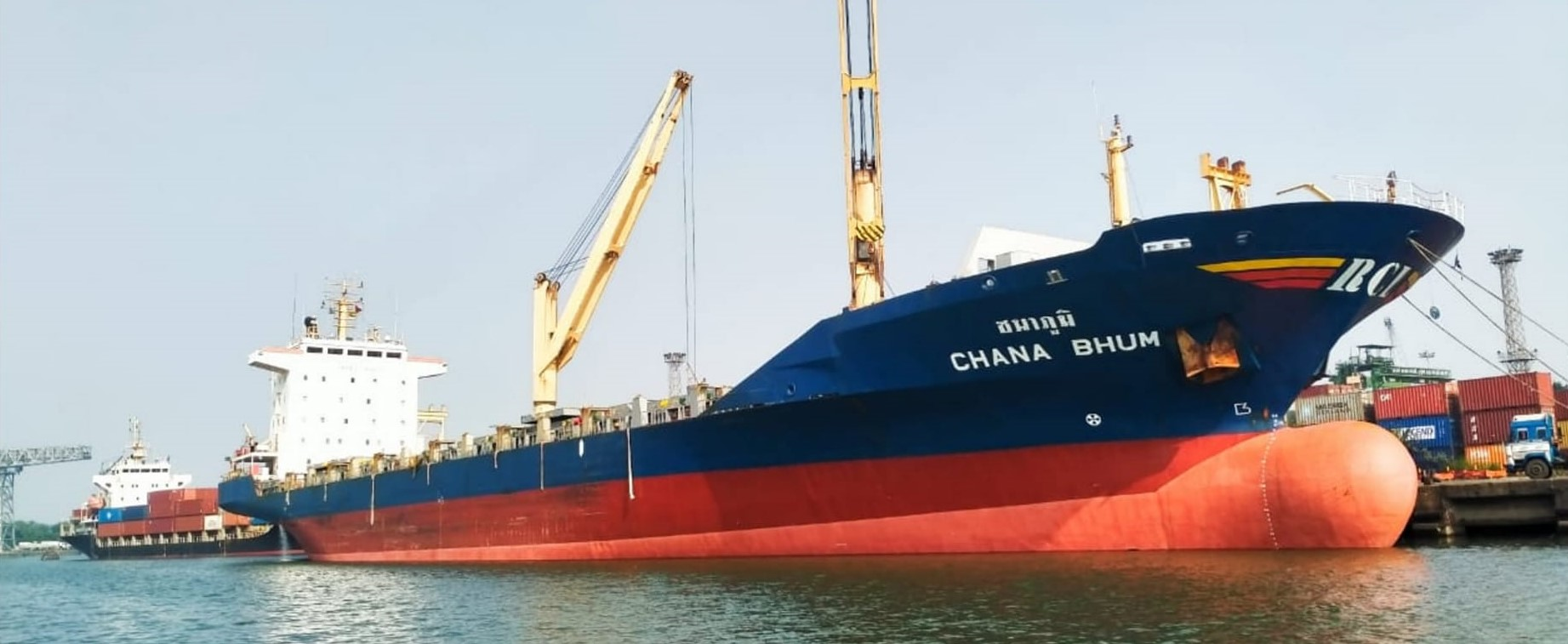
- Container ship MV Chana Bhum berthed at Berth No. 3 of Netaji Subhas Dock
- Interactive map of Syama Prasad Mookerjee Port
- Native name: কলকাতা বন্দর (Bengali)

Location
- Country: India
- Location: Kolkata, West Bengal, India
- Coordinates: 22°32′46″N 88°18′53″E
- UN/LOCODE: INCCU

Details
- Opened: 1870; 156 years ago
- Operated by: Syama Prasad Mukherjee Port Authority
- Owned by: Syama Prasad Mukherjee Port Authority, Ministry of Ports, Shipping and Waterways, Government of India
- Type of Harbor: Coastal breakwater, riverine, large seaport
- Size: 4,500 acres (18 km^{2})
- No. of berths: 34 (Kolkata); 17 (Haldia)
- No. of wharfs: 86
- Draft depth: Kolkata: 8.5 metres (28 ft); Haldia: 9.1 metres (30 ft)
- Employees: 3,600
- Main trades: Automobiles, motorcycles and general industrial cargo including iron ore, granite, coal, fertilizers, petroleum products, and containers Major exports: Iron ore, leather, cotton textiles Major imports: Wheat, raw cotton, machinery, iron & steel
- Stacking area: 134722 sqm
- Water depth: 12.5 metres (41 ft) (KDS and HDC)

Statistics
- Vessel arrivals: 3194 (2025–26)
- Annual cargo tonnage: 70.872 million tonnes(2025–26)
- Annual container volume: 960,549 TEUs (2025–26)
- Passenger traffic: 1,310 (2023–24)
- Annual revenue: ₹3,227.67 crore (US$340 million) (2023–24)
- Net income: ₹501.73 crore (US$52 million) (2023–24)
- Website www.kolkataporttrust.gov.in

The Port of Kolkata, formerly known as Port of Calcutta officially now as Syama Prasad Mookerjee Port (SPMP, Kolkata), is the only riverine major port in India, in the city of Kolkata, West Bengal, erstwhile Calcutta, around 203 kilometres (126 mi) from the sea. It is the oldest operating port in India and was constructed by the British East India Company. Kolkata is a freshwater port with no variation in salinity. The port has two distinct dock systems – Kolkata Dock System and Haldia Dock Complex. As an important riverine port, it provides both domestic and international freight and passenger services, being the terminus of India's longest National Waterway.

In the 19th century, the Kolkata Port was the premier port in British India. From 1838 to 1917, the British used this port to ship off over half a million Indians from all over India – mostly from the Bhojpur and Awadh — and take them to places across the world, such as Latin America and Africa as indentured labourers. After independence, the port's importance decreased because of factors including the Partition of Bengal (1947), reduction in the size of the port hinterland, and economic stagnation in eastern India.

It has a vast hinterland comprising the entire North East of India including West Bengal, Bihar, Jharkhand, Uttar Pradesh, Madhya Pradesh, Assam, North East Hill States and two landlocked neighbouring countries namely, Nepal and Bhutan and also the Autonomous Region of Tibet (China). With the turn of the 21st century, the volume of throughput has again started increasing steadily. As of March 2018, the port is capable of processing annually 650,000 containers, mostly from Nepal, Bhutan, and India's northeastern states.

== History ==
=== Early time ===
In the early 16th century, Since the arrival of the Portuguese, who established the first European contact with Bengal, customs duties collected from trading settlements upstream of the Hooghly River heralded a change in the navigational system of the Ganges. The prosperous Saptagram port at the confluence of the Saraswati and Bhagirathi River was becoming increasingly impassable for ocean-going cargo ships. At this time, the Portuguese first used the present location of the port to anchor their ships, since they found the upper reaches of the Hooghly river, beyond Kolkata, unsafe for navigation. By the end of the 16th century, large Portuguese ships were anchored in Betor. Betor was a place on the outskirts of Kolkata. From Saptagram (Santgao) the goods were ferried by small ships and loaded onto larger ships. In 1570 AD, the Portuguese shifted their trading post from Saptagram to Hooghly, a few miles downstream. Soon Saptagram was replaced by Hooghly as the sea outlet of the region. Hooghly maintained its importance throughout the 17th century. A few decades later, after the Portuguese were driven out by the Mughals in 1632 AD, the Dutch and the English established their trading posts here. But, the trade of Hooghly further downstream, especially as far as Sutanuti and Gobindpur, encouraged the expansion of smaller trading centers and settlements into larger scale activities.

Kolkata was a small river port inhabited by weavers and artisans before it was developed as a center for maritime trade by the British East India Company. The port on the Hooghly shore acted as a catalyst in the transformation of the city of Kolkata from a small weaving settlement to a major center of maritime trade in East India. Job Charnock, an employee and administrator of the British East India Company, is believed to have founded a trading post at the site in 1690. Even before settling in Kolkata, the British knew that among the navigable areas of the Hooghly River, the deepest water area is along the eastern bank from Gobindpur to Garden Reach and was easily navigable by large sea-going vessels. Since the area was situated on the river with jungle on three sides, it was considered safe from enemy invasion. From the mid-eighteenth century the growth of Kolkata's port was accelerated by the decline of the Mughal-era major ports of Hooghly on Hooghly River and Surat on the western coast.

=== Company Rule: 1773–1857 ===
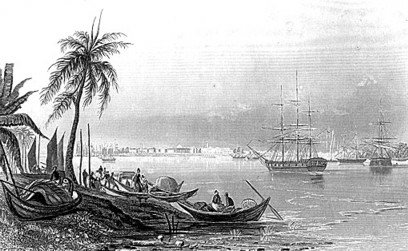
View of the Calcutta port in 1852

In the early colonial period, the main purpose of the port administration under the company's naval office, headed by a master attendant, was to provide pilotage services to ocean-going vessels. The Master Attendant also regularly conducted river surveys to report on the navigability of the river. The port's lack of docking facilities became a particular concern from the mid-eighteenth century, as ships were taken to Bombay for repairs. In 1790, the first dock was built near Bankshall Ghat. Already in 1781, Colonel Watson was granted a site on the southern boundary of the harbor to build a floating dock. Watson set up a marine yard at Kiddirpor and also began construction of a floating dock in 1781, but was forced to abandon the project when legal disputes arose. Watson subsequently turned to shipyards and built a small number of ships before his retirement from the business. After Watson several steps were taken to establish shipbuilding factories in Kolkata, but none of them were comparable to the shipbuilding activities of Parsi Enterprises in Bombay.

In the 1820s, several plans were made to build floating docks in Kolkata and Diamond Harbour, but none of them materialised. When the disastrous cyclone of 1842 caused extensive damage to ships anchored in Kolkata harbour, the issue of dock construction came into discussion again. But modernization of the Port of Kolkata was overshadowed by a failed attempt to establish a new port, Port Canning on Matla River in the 1860s. Port canning scheme is formulated from an alternative thought of the entrepreneurs. From a business point of view, they believed that river silting problems would lead to the premature death of the Port of Kolkata, just as the Port of Saptagram on the Hooghly River had died three hundred years earlier. But Kolkata became a very important city for the British, so they abandoned the plan to establish a port on Matla River. To bring more efficiency to the management of the Port of Kolkata, the government was active in setting up the Port Trust, which provided a solid base for the British Empire's trade in India.

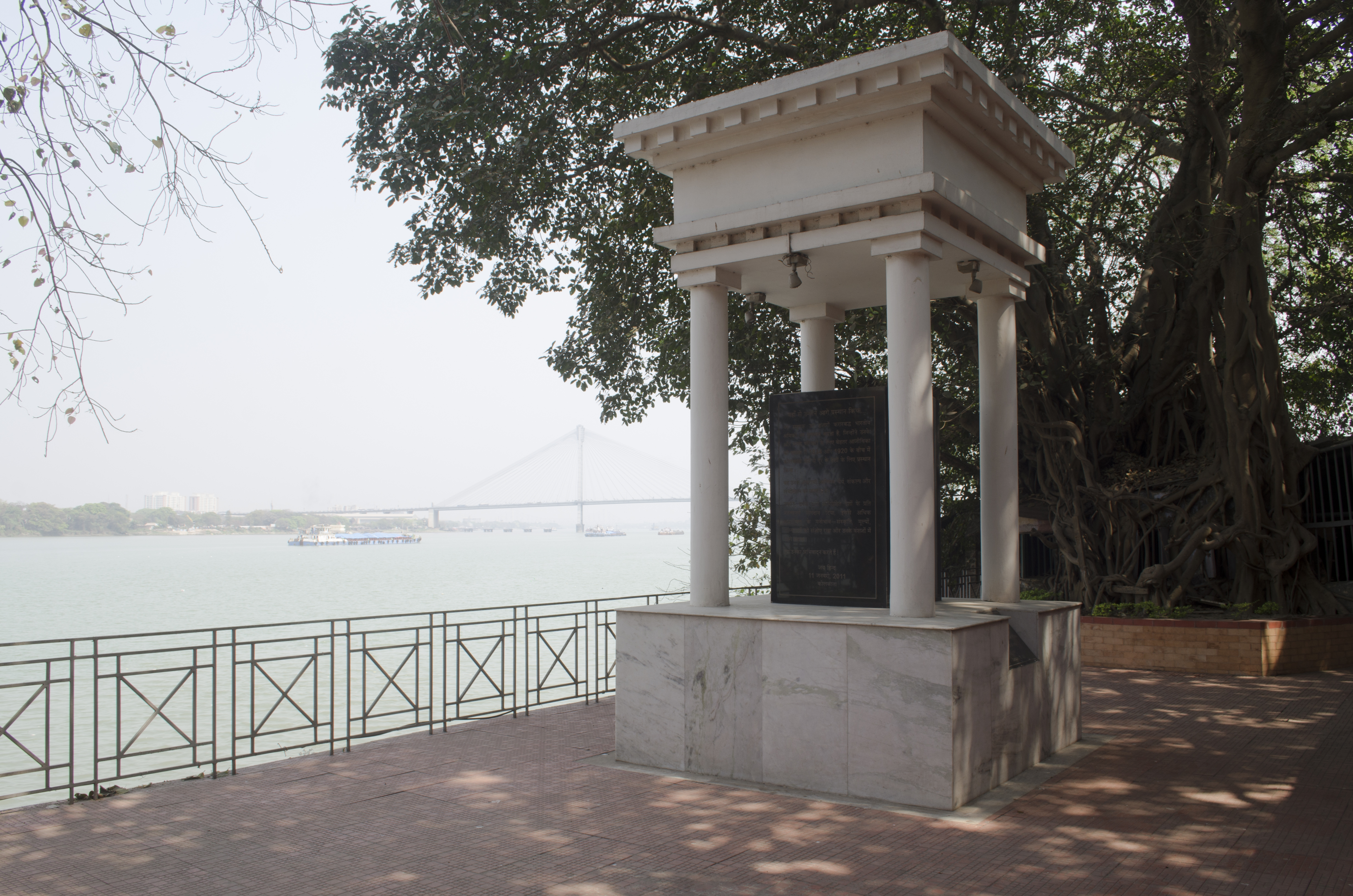
Indenture Memorial, Kidderepore

After slavery was abolished in 1833, there was a high demand for labourers on sugar cane plantations in the British Empire. From 1838 to 1917, the British used this port to ship off over half a million Indians from all over India – mostly from the Hindi Belt (especially Bhojpur and Awadh) — and take them to places across the world, such as Mauritius, Fiji, South Africa, Trinidad and Tobago, Guyana, Suriname, and other Caribbean islands as indentured labourers. There are millions of Indo-Mauritians, Indo-Fijians, and Indo-Caribbean people in the world today.

=== British India: 1857–1947 ===
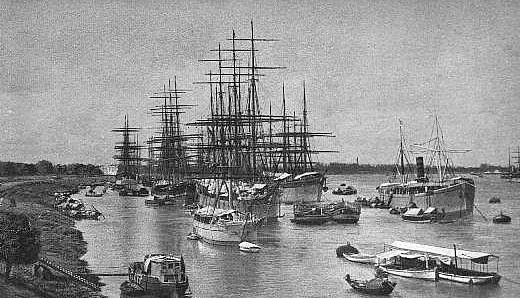
An image of the old port of Kolkata.

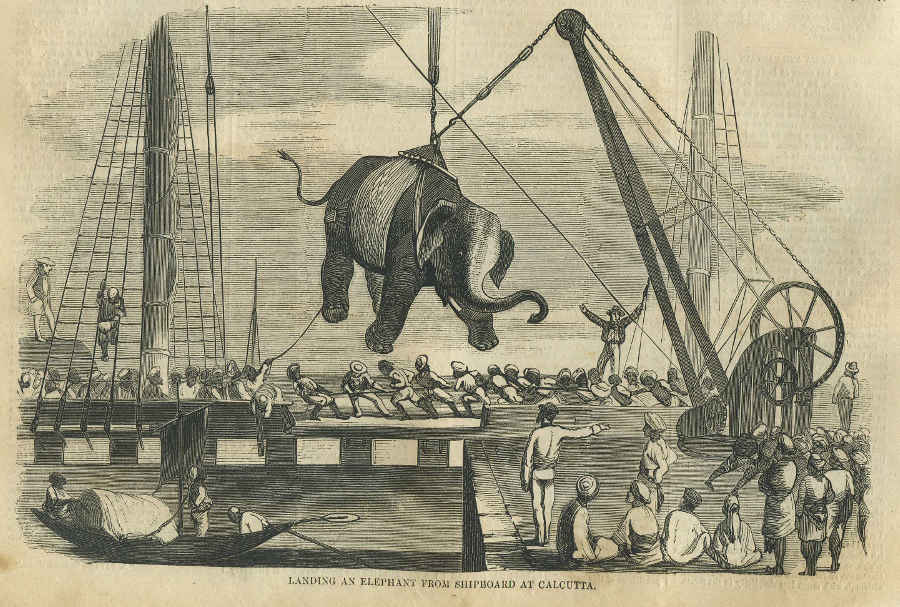
Landing an elephant from shipboard at Calcutta, from Harpers Weekly, 1858

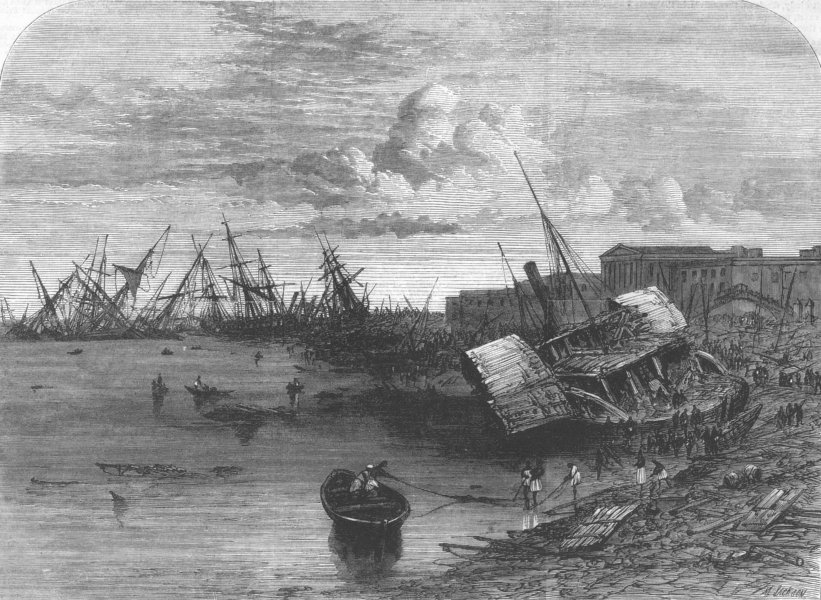
Effects of the cyclone at Calcutta from the Illustrated London News, 1864

As Kolkata grew in size and importance, merchants in the city demanded the setting up of a port trust in 1863. The disastrous cyclone of 1864 caused extensive damage to Kolkata port and the city of Kolkata. During this time ships anchored in Kolkata Harbor were damaged and destroyed. According to the then documents published by the British rulers, at that time the damage in the storm in the city of Kolkata alone exceeded 99 thousand rupees. Belvedere Estate, Judge's Court, European Lunatic Hospital, and many famous institutions of Calcutta were destroyed in the violence of nature. The Hooghly River was witnessing high tides up to a height of about 40 feet (12 m). After this incident there was a strong demand for the construction of a permanent dock. The colonial government formed a River Trust in 1866, but it soon failed, and administration was again taken up by the government. Finally, in 1870, the Calcutta Port Act (Act V of 1870) was passed, creating the offices of Calcutta Port Commissioners. At that time Calcutta port had only four jetties and one wharf for unloading cargo, which could berth 52 ships and had a total capacity of 48,000 tons. In 1871–72, the number of jetties had increased to 6, with a berth of 143 ships and a cargo capacity of 222,000 tons. The length of the wharf also increases significantly. Commodities such as crops, seeds and raw materials and mainly jute products were moved through this wharf. In the 1870s, rapidly increasing tea exports from Assam and North Bengal necessitated the construction of a warehouse on Strand Bank Island.

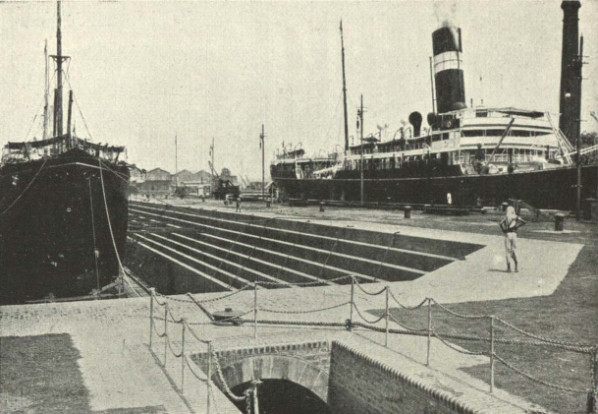
Kidderpore Dry Dock, c. 1905

A wet dock was set up at Kidderpore (Khidirpur) in 1892. This was the result of persistent demands by the merchant community of Kolkata. As cargo traffic at the port grew, so did the requirement of more kerosene, leading to the building of a petroleum wharf at Budge Budge in 1896. The Khidirpur Dock II was completed in 1902. During the twenty years before the World War I, a remarkable development was observed in the import-export sector through the Port of Kolkata. Coastal trade also developed significantly, particularly in the export of coal. After the partition of Bengal in 1905, the government of Eastern Bengal and Assam developed Port of Chittagong as a rival to Kolkata, but it was not very fruitful. In 1925, the Garden Reach jetty was added to accommodate greater cargo traffic.

Although hampered by the Great Depression during the period between the two world wars, the modernization of the Port of Kolkata also took place along with the development of modern industries. A new dock, named King George's Dock, was commissioned in 1928 (it was renamed Netaji Subhash Dock in 1973). Though the port was conceived to be a commercial port and gateway of eastern India, the port played a very important role in the Second World War. It was bombed twice by the Japanese forces.

=== India: 1947–present ===
The port facilities were devalued during the Second World War, but the Port of Kolkata was revived by economic changes after India's independence. The First Five Year Plan called for the acquisition of new vessels such as dredgers, survey vessels, dock tugs, anchor vessels, light vessels and launches for Port of Kolkata along with other ports in India. The Haldia Dock project was initiated in the Third Five Year Plan to ease the pressure on the Port of Kolkata. The Commissioners for the Port of Kolkata were responsible for the port till January 1975 when Major Port Trusts Act, 1963, came into force. The port is now run by a board of trustees having representatives from the Government, Trade Bodies, various Port Users, Labour Unions and some nominated members. The Farakka Barrage was designed to divert 1,800 cubic meters per second (64,000 cu ft/s) of water from the Ganges into the Hooghly River to remove silt from Kolkata harbor without the need for regular mechanical dredging. The barrage, about 2,304 meters (7,559 ft) long, began operations on 21 April 1975. After commissioning of the project it was found that the water flow diverted from the Farakka Barrage was not sufficient to satisfactorily desilt the river. On 12 January 2020, the port was renamed to Syama Prasad Mookerjee Port by Prime Minister Narendra Modi on the occasion of 150 years of operation of Kolkata Port at Netaji Indoor Stadium.

(1870 to 2021)

(2021–present)

Evolution of logos

The port is part of the 21st Century Maritime Silk Road that runs from the Chinese coast via the Suez Canal to the Mediterranean, there to the Upper Adriatic region of Trieste with its rail connections to Central and Eastern Europe.

== Dock systems ==
The Kolkata Port Trust (KoPT) manages two separate dock agglomerations, the Kolkata Dock System (KDS) and the Haldia Dock Complex (HDC). These two dock systems are located on the banks of the Hooghly River, giving the port the distinction of being India's only riverine major port.

=== Kolkata Dock System ===
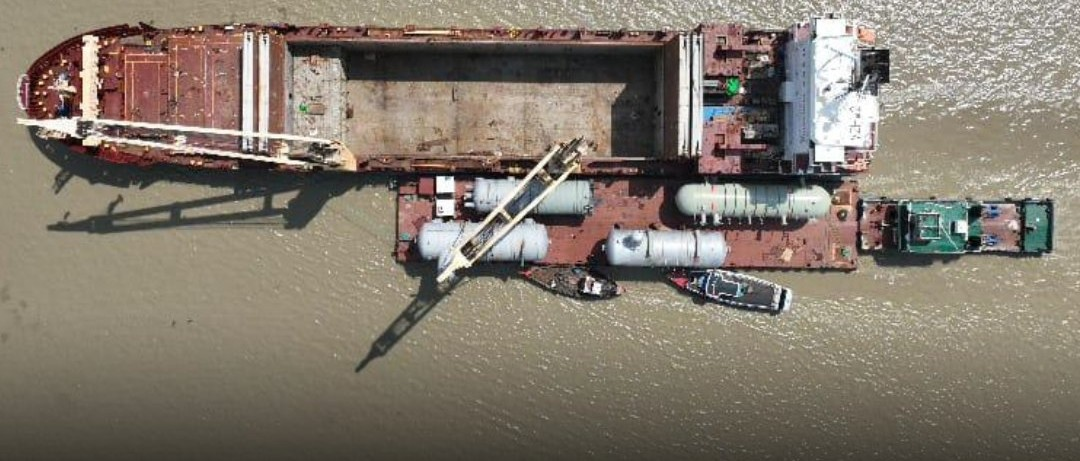
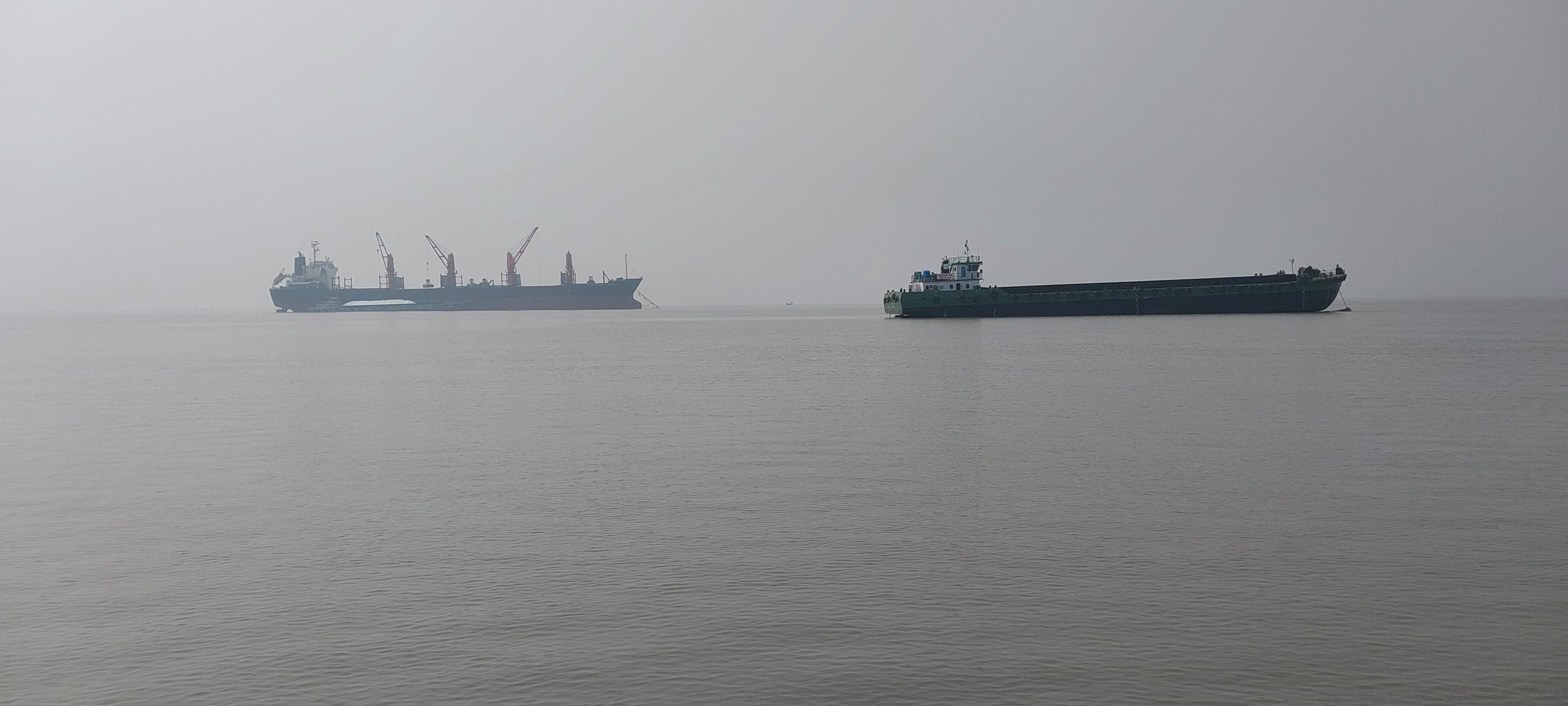
Left:Over Dimensional cargo is being loaded onto a barge from a ship at Diamond Harbor Anchorage in West Bengal. Right:Diamond Harbour anchorage.

It is situated on the left bank of the Hooghly River at about 203 km (126 mi) upstream from the sea. The pilotage station is at Gasper/ Saugor roads, 145 Kilometres to the south of the KDS (around 58 km from the sea). The system consists of Khidirpur Dock (KPD), Netaji Subhash Dock (NSD), Budge Budge River Mooring (BB), Diamond Harbor Anchorage, Sagar Anchorage and Sandheads Anchorage. This dock system mainly serves container ships and barges. Among the docks and moorings in the Kolkata dock system, Khidirpur dock has the lowest water depth, while the Budge Budge river mooring has the highest water depth. Apart from this, there are around 80 major riverine jetties, and many minor jetties, and a large number of ship breaking berths.

Vessels to enter Khidirpur Dock (KPD) and Netaji Subhash Dock (NSD) of the Kolkata Dock System first wait for tides at the anchorage at Nazirganj Flats, north of Garden Reach. 5 ships can be anchored together in this anchorage. When the water level of the river reaches the level of the Kolkata Dock System (KDS) water level due to tidal action, the ships waiting at the anchorage enter Khidirpur Dock (KPD) and Netaji Subhash Dock (NSD) through lock-gates.

==== Kidderpore Dock (KPD) ====
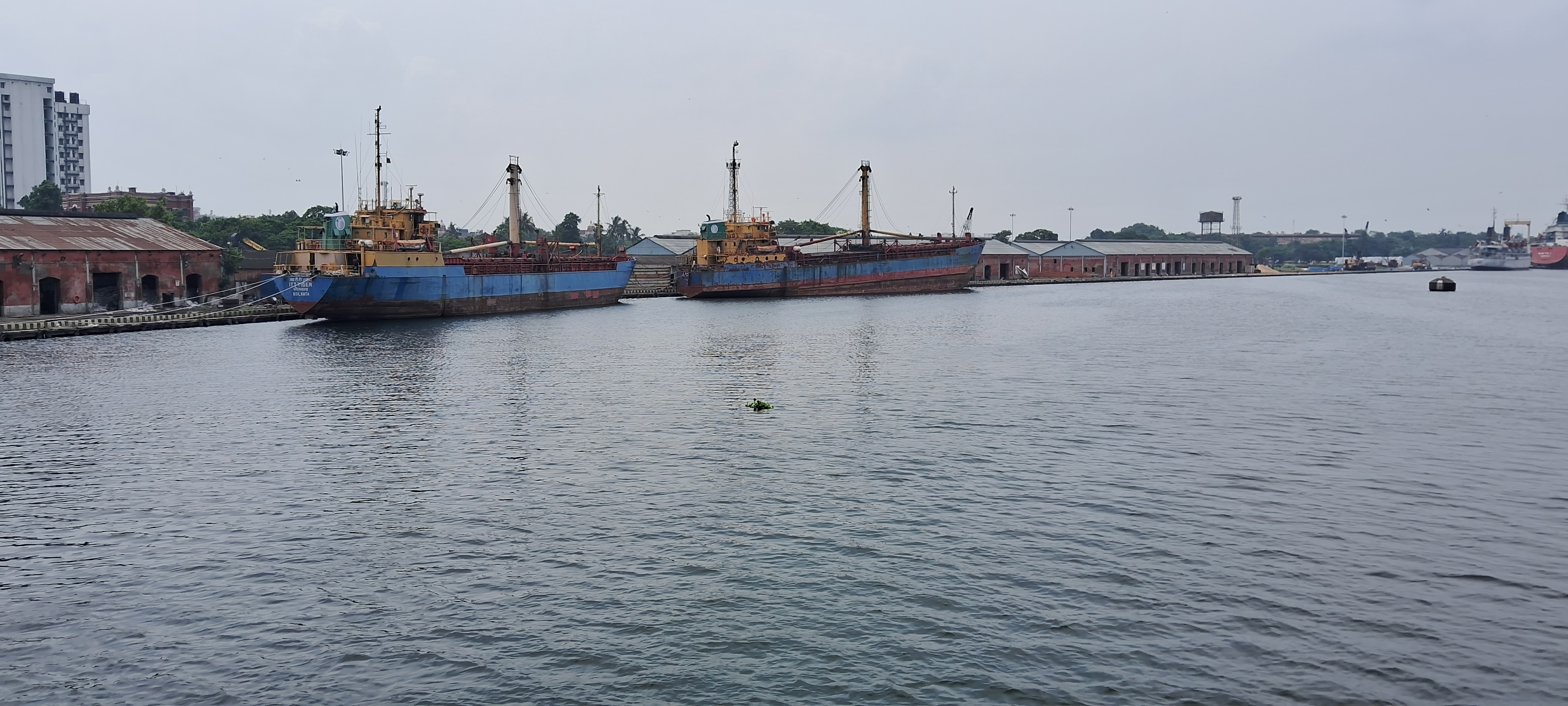
View of the western part of Kidderpore Dock (KDP-1).

Kidderpore Dock has a total of 18 berths, including 17 multipurpose berths and 1 berth for passenger ships including cargo; 6 Buoys / Moorings and 3 Dry Docks. Berths are identified by numbers, which can range from 1 to 29. The berths have uneven water depth, with a minimum of 7.4 metres (24 ft) at berth No. 29 and a maximum of 9.2 metres (30 ft) at berth No. 8. Kidderpore Dock is divided into two parts, which are KDP-1 (West) and KDP-2 (East). Out of total 18 berths, KDP-1 consists of 10 berths and KDP-2 consists of 8 berths. These two parts – KDP-1 and KDP-2 – are separated by a bascule bridge. The dock's quays have a combined length of 2,956 meters (9,698 ft), of which KDP-1 (West) is 1,728 meters (5,669 ft) and KDP-2 (East) is 1,228 meters (4,029 feet). The dock is connected to the shipping channel – Hooghly River, through a lock gate. A section of the dock between the lock gate and KDP-1 is the "tidal basin"; dry docks are connected to this basin. Ships enter the dock through a lock gate. The lock barrel is 176.8 metres (580 ft) long and 24.4 m (80 ft) wide. The depth in front of the lock gate is about 2.9 metres (9 ft 6 in) to 3 metres (9.8 ft). Accordingly, vessels with a maximum length of 157 meters (515 feet) and a maximum width of 21.35 meters (70 feet) are able to enter the dock. Buoys/moorings installed within the docks provide support to the movement of ships. Kidderpore Dock has several bends, and no night navigation; as a result the ships operate only during the day.

==== Netaji Subhas Dock (NSD) ====
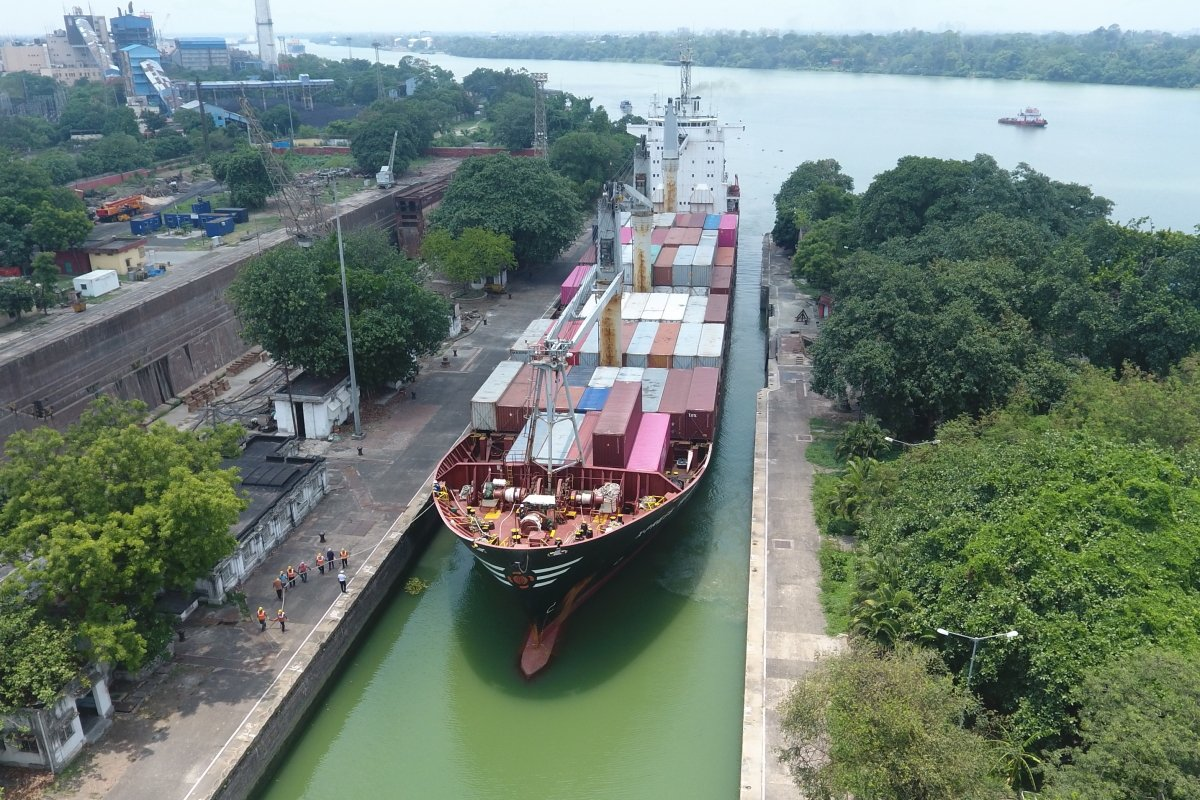
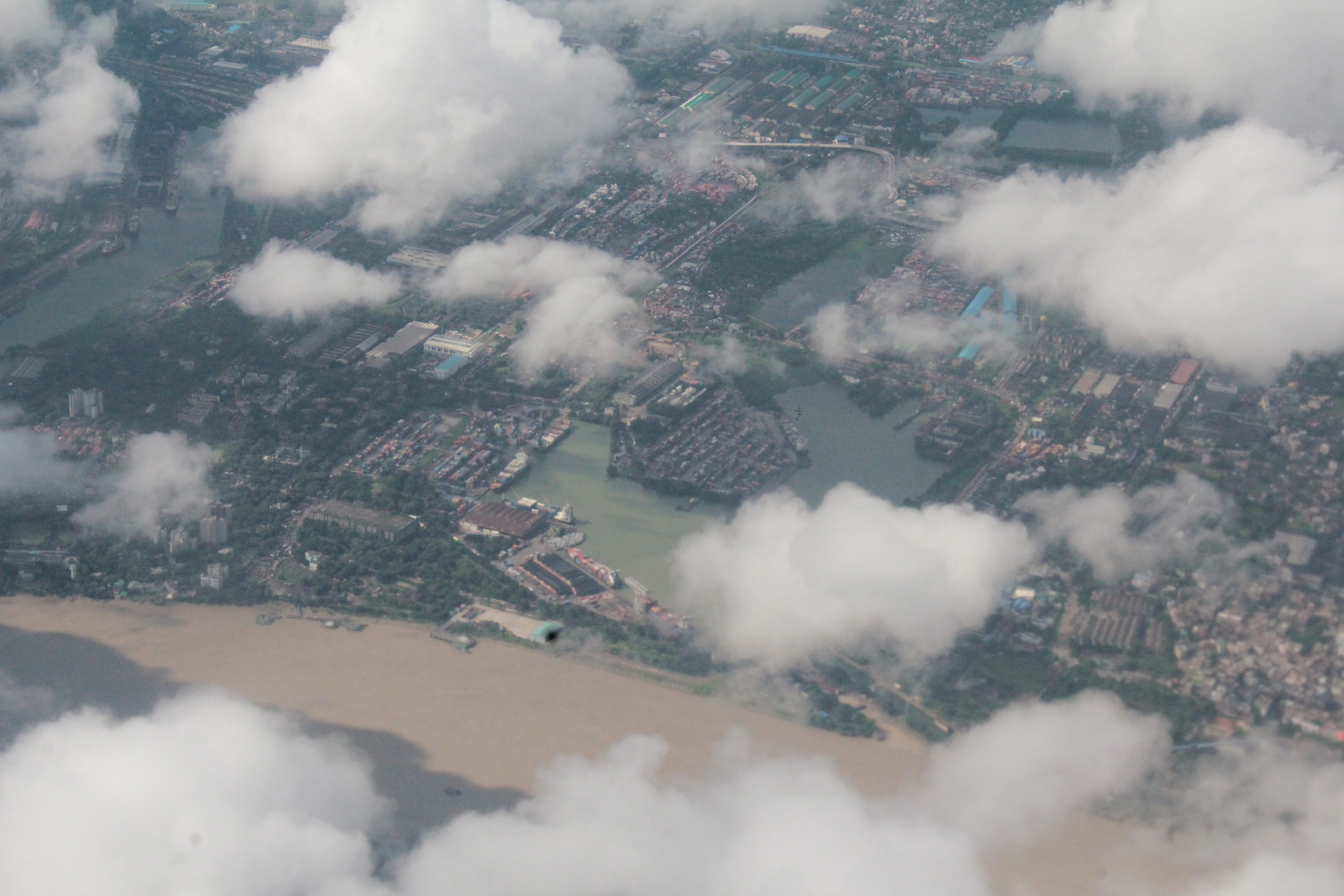
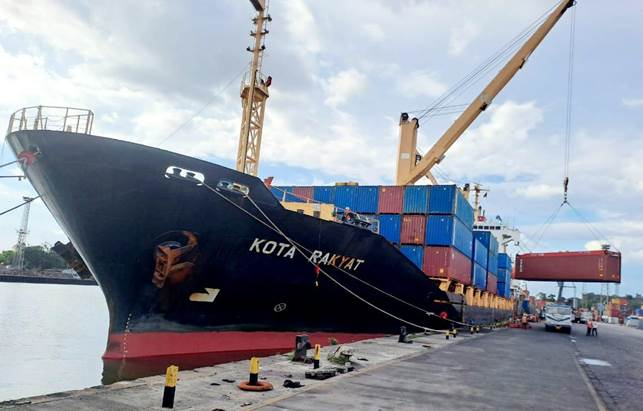
Left: MV Star Amber at the lock gate of Netaji Subhas Dock (NSD). Center: Aerial View of Netaji Subhas Dock and Hooghly River. Right:MV Kota Rakyat unloading containers at the Netaji Subhash Dock of Kolkata Dock System.

Netaji Subhas Dock (NSD) has a total of 10 berths, including 1 heavy lift berth, 4 dedicated container berths, 1 liquid cargo berth and 4 multipurpose berths; 2 Buoys / Moorings and 2 Dry Docks. Berths are identified by numbers, which can range from 1 to 14. The berths have uneven water depths, with a minimum of 7.1 meters (23 ft) at berth No. 1 and a maximum of 9 meters (30 ft) at berth No. 3. The dock is connected to the shipping channel – Hooghly River, through a lock gate. 2 Buoys/moorings within the docks provide support to the movement of ships.

Container ships are mainly handled through this dock, and most of the containers of the Port of Kolkata are transported. There is a container terminal at the dock, which consists of a total of 5 berths – No. 3, No. 4, No. 5, No. 7 and No. 8 berth. The shortest berths in the terminal in terms of length is berth No. 4, which is 181 meters (594 ft) long and capable of handling ships up to 565 ft (172 m) long; And the longest is Berth No. 8, which is 225 meters (738 ft) long and capable of handling ships up to 507 ft (155 m) long.

==== Budge Budge River Moorings ====
Budge Budge River Mooring or Budge Budge Petroleum Wharves is one of the earliest cargo handling facilities built on the Hooghly River, which is still in operation today. It consists of 6 oil (petroleum) Wharves. Wharves are identified by numbers, which can range from 1 to 8 (except numbers 4 and 6). The water depth at the Wharves is uneven, with a maximum of 13.3 m (44 ft) at berth No. 1 and a minimum of 7.9 m (26 ft) at berth No. 8. The maximum size of vessel that can be accommodated is 620 feet (190 m) in length at the No. 1 and No. 8 Wharves.

=== Haldia Dock Complex ===
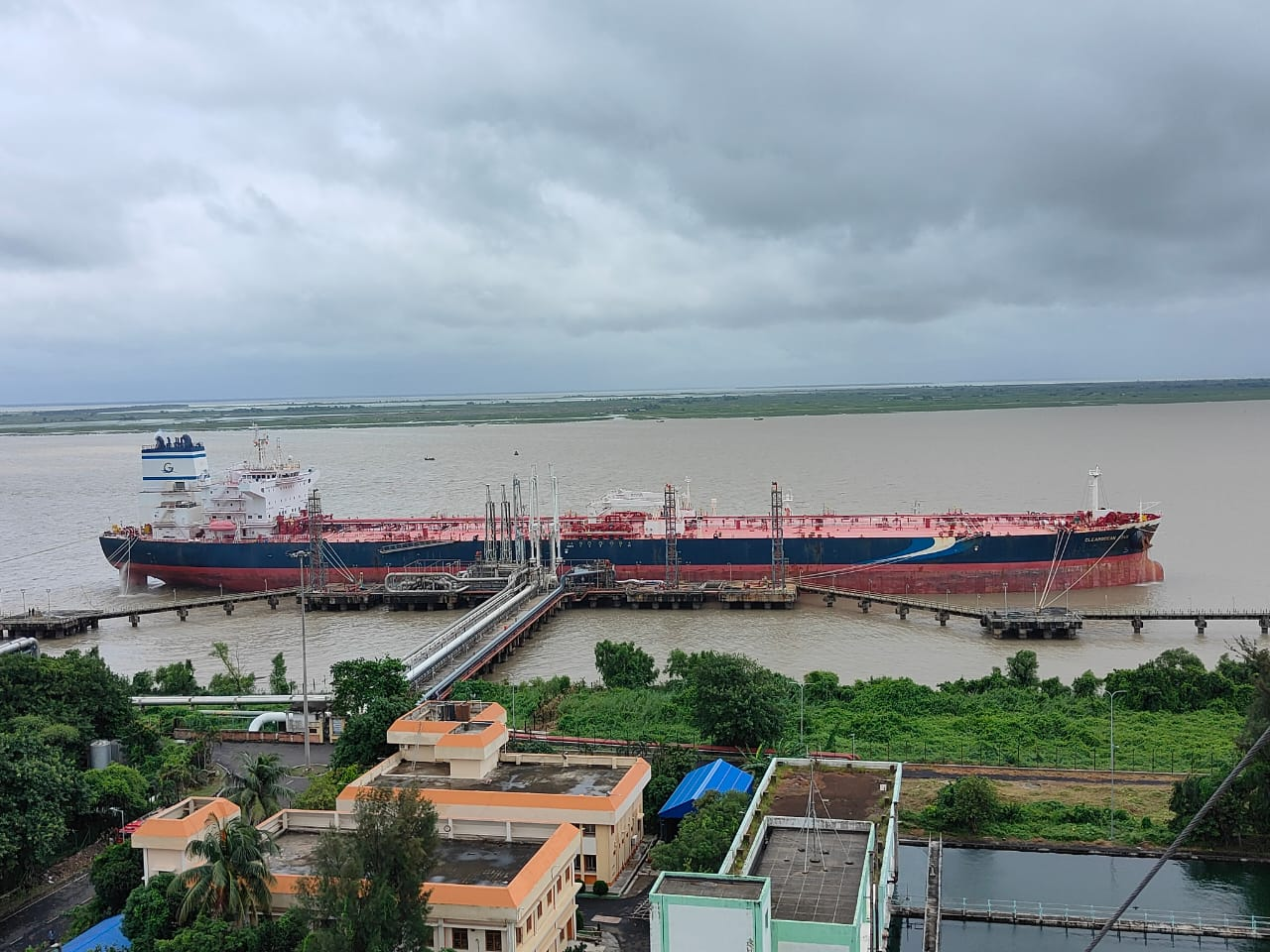
MT Clearocean Ajax With 48,111 MT of Naphtha anchored at Haldia Oil Jetty-III of Haldia Dock Complex.

The Haldia Dock Complex is situated at around 60 kilometres (37 mi) away from the pilotage station. It is developed as a subsidiary port system of the Kolkata Dock System in Kolkata. The maximum water depth in this Dock Complex is 12.5 meters (41 ft), which provides the ability to anchor ships up to 277 meters (909 ft) long. It is connected to the deep sea by the Western Channel, with an average depth of 8.4 meters (28 ft); therefore, the dock area is capable of anchoring ships up to 230 meters (750 ft) long.

The complex consists of a dock, oil and barge jetty and Haldia anchorage. The dock complex has a total of 14 berths and 3 oil jetties; Berths are inside docks with lock-gate and jetties are located on the Hooghly River. The berths of the impounded dock include – 6 dry bulk cargo berths, 3 liquid cargo berths, 3 multipurpose berths and 2 dedicated container berths. Berths are identified by numbers, which can range from 2 to 13. The berths (impounded dock) have uneven water depth, with a minimum of 10 meters (33 ft) in berths No. 2 and No. 10, and a maximum of 12.5 meters (41 ft) in berths other than No. 2 and No. 10. The dock is connected to the Hooghly River, the shipping channel, through a lock-gate.

The jetties on the Hooghly River mainly transport liquid products — crude oil, POL products, naphtha, liquefied petroleum gas (LPG) and edible oil. These jetties are known as Haldia Oil Jetty, and are identified by Roman numerals. The water depth is 10 m (33 ft) at the first (HOJ-I) and second (HOJ-II) oil jetties, and 12.5 m (41 ft) at the third (HOJ-III) oil jetty. Recently, a fourth oil jetty, known as Outer Terminal 2, has been constructed between the Dock's Approach Jetty and the Second Oil Jetty (HOJ-II); the water depth at the jetty is 9 m (30 ft). Outer Terminal 1 (OT-1) is located upstream of the third oil jetty (HOJ-III) for the transportation of dry bulk cargo; the jetty has a water depth of 8.5 meters (28 ft) and is capable of anchoring vessels up to 8 metres (26 ft) in draft. Haldia Anchorage is used for lash vessels.

=== Dry Dock ===
Dry Docks of Kolkata Port Trust
Dock	Dry Dock Number	Size
Netaji Subhas Dock	1	172.21 metres (565.0 ft) x 22.86 metres (75.0 ft)
Netaji Subhas Dock	2	172.21 metres (565.0 ft) x 22.86 metres (75.0 ft)
Kidderpore Dock	1	160.02 metres (525.0 ft) x 19.5 metres (64 ft)
Kidderpore Dock	2	142.95 metres (469.0 ft) x 19.5 metres (64 ft)
Kidderpore Dock	3	102.1 metres (335 ft) x 14.63 metres (48.0 ft)

KoPT has the largest dry dock facility in India. These dry docks cater to the diverse repair and maintenance needs of the vessels calling on the Eastern Ports of India. In addition, shipbuilding facilities are also available in these dry docks. All the dry docks are inside the impounded dock system. There are five dry docks of which three are in Kidderpore Dock and two are in Netaji Subhas Dock. Dry Dock No. 1, Dry Dock No. 2 and Dry Dock No. 3 of Kidderpore Dock have 184, 138 and 125 kill blocks respectively, and Dry Dock No. 1 and Dry Dock No. 2 of Netaji Subhash Dock have 170 and 175 kill blocks respectively; keel blocks hold the ship in place during repairs.

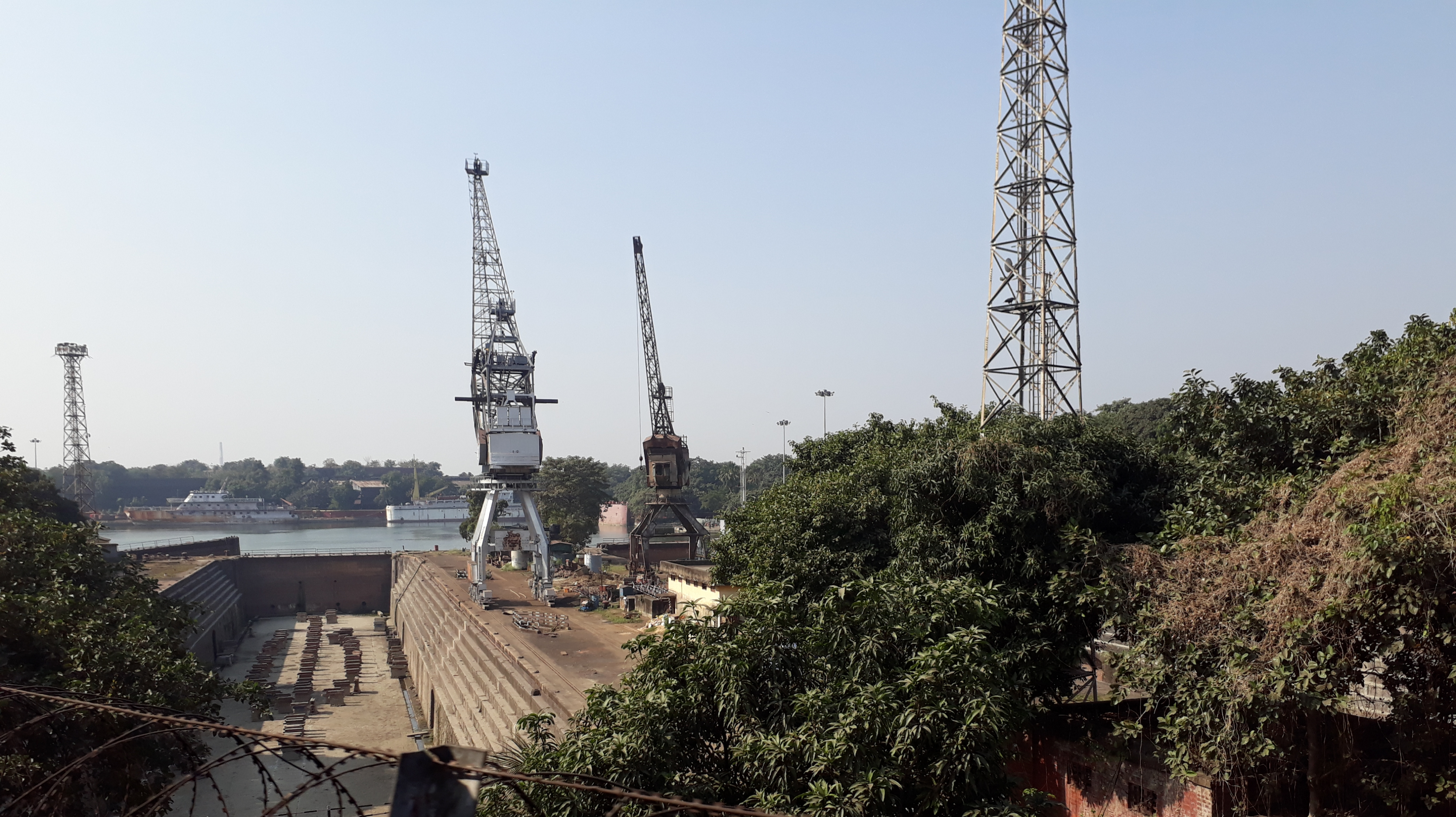
One of the three dry docks at Khidirpur Dock.

There is a fully-fledged repair workshop including Diesel Engine Overhauling Unit, Structural Shop, Heavy and Light Machine Shop, Forging Shop, Electrical Shop and a Chain Testing/Repair Shop with 2500 KN capacity Tensile Compression Testing Machine to support various activities in the dry dock. Electric Level Luffing Cranes of 5 tonne and 7 tonne capacities are used at Dry Dock No. 1 and No. 2 of Kiddirpore Dock respectively, operating area radius of which area 20 m (66 ft) and 25.42 m (83.4 ft) respectively. 4 cranes are used at Netaji Subhash Dock, which includes 1 Electric Level Luffing Crane and 3 Electric Cranes. The Electric Level Luffing Crane has a capacity of 25 tons and a operating area radius of 15.25 m (50.0 ft); on the other hand, 2 of the electric cranes have a capacity of 3 and 6 tons and the other is of 3 ton capacity.

== Port channel ==
Nautical chart containing information on the navigation of the Hooghly River from Sagar Point to Kolkata, published in 1905 by the United Kingdom Hydrographic Office.

The port has a 232 kilometers (144 mi) long shipping channel. Most ships navigating the Channel require a pilot, and the sharp bends and submerged Sandbars of the Channel require the assistance of tugboats for larger ships. The channel extends from the Sandheads area of the Bay of Bengal to the Khidirpur Docks of the Kolkata Dock System in the city of Kolkata; in the 87 km (54 mi) long stretch from the Sandheads to the Sagar Road, where vessels are managed through the Syama Prasad Mukherjee Port Authority's Vessel Traffic Management System. The depth of water in the channel is higher during monsoon than summer.

Port of Kolkata has two entrances from the sea, one is the Eastern Channel and the other is the Western Channel. At present the eastern channel is used for ships bound for Kolkata, while the western channel is used for navigation by ships bound for Haldia. The Eastern Channel is longer than the Western Channel (more than twice), so this channel has the most submerged Sandbars. Notable submerged Sandbars in the Eastern Channel are Sankrail Sandbar, Baj Baj Sandbar, Royapur Sandbar, Falta Sandbar, Nurpur Sandbar, Rangafala Sandbar, Korapara Sandbar, Bedford Sandbar (upper and lower) and Long Sandbar (upper and lower); natural depth of water at Falta is 3 meters (9.8 ft). The Eastern Channel is divided into several smaller channels; smaller channels are mainly divided by submerged Sandbars. The offshore portion of the Eastern Channel is known as the Gaspar Channel, which has a minimum natural depth of 7 meters (23 ft), and the portion of the Hooghly River that extends from the Sagar Road to Diamond Harbor is divided into two smaller channels – the Bedford Channel and the Rangafala Channel. The Western Channel is divided into three main smaller channels, namely Eden Channel, Upper and Lower Jellingham Channel and Haldia Channel. Balari Channel is situated upstream of Haldia Channel. The Balari Channel was formerly navigable, serving as a link between the Eastern Channel and the Western Channel; but in the latter part of the last century it was declared unnavigable and abandoned by the port authority due to excessive siltation.

The depth of the channel depends on the flow of water in the Hooghly River. Channel depth is not equal at all locations due to the presence of submerged Sandbars. The channel is 50 m (160 ft) deep at Sandheads and 9 m (30 ft) to 10 m (33 ft) deep at Sagar Road. The minimum depth of the Eastern Channel up to Kolkata is 3 m (9.8 ft). At high tide the depth of the channel is more than 8.5 m (28 ft); While ships with a maximum draft of 8.5 meters (28 ft) and a minimum draft of 5.4 meters (18 ft) are able to navigate. The 110 kilometres (68 mi) long channel – Western Channel – up to Haldia has a minimum depth of 4.3 m (14 ft) and a minimum width of 345 m (1,132 ft). At high tide the depth of the Western Channel exceeds 9 m (30 ft); While vessels with a maximum draft of 9 meters (30 ft) and a minimum draft of 7.6 meters (25 ft) are able to navigate.

Depth of water in the channel
Depth		Kolkata	Diamond Harbor	Sagar Road	Haldia	Sandheads
Natural depth	Minimum	3.4 metres (11 ft)	5.3 metres (17 ft)	6.4 metres (21 ft)	5.6 metres (18 ft)	50 metres (160 ft)
Depth during tides	Maximum	8.5 metres (28 ft)	9.5 metres (31 ft)	10 metres (33 ft)	9.9 metres (32 ft)	50 metres (160 ft)
Depth during tides	Average	7.2 metres (24 ft)			8.4 metres (28 ft)	50 metres (160 ft)

=== Navigational system of the channel ===
==== Pilotage ====
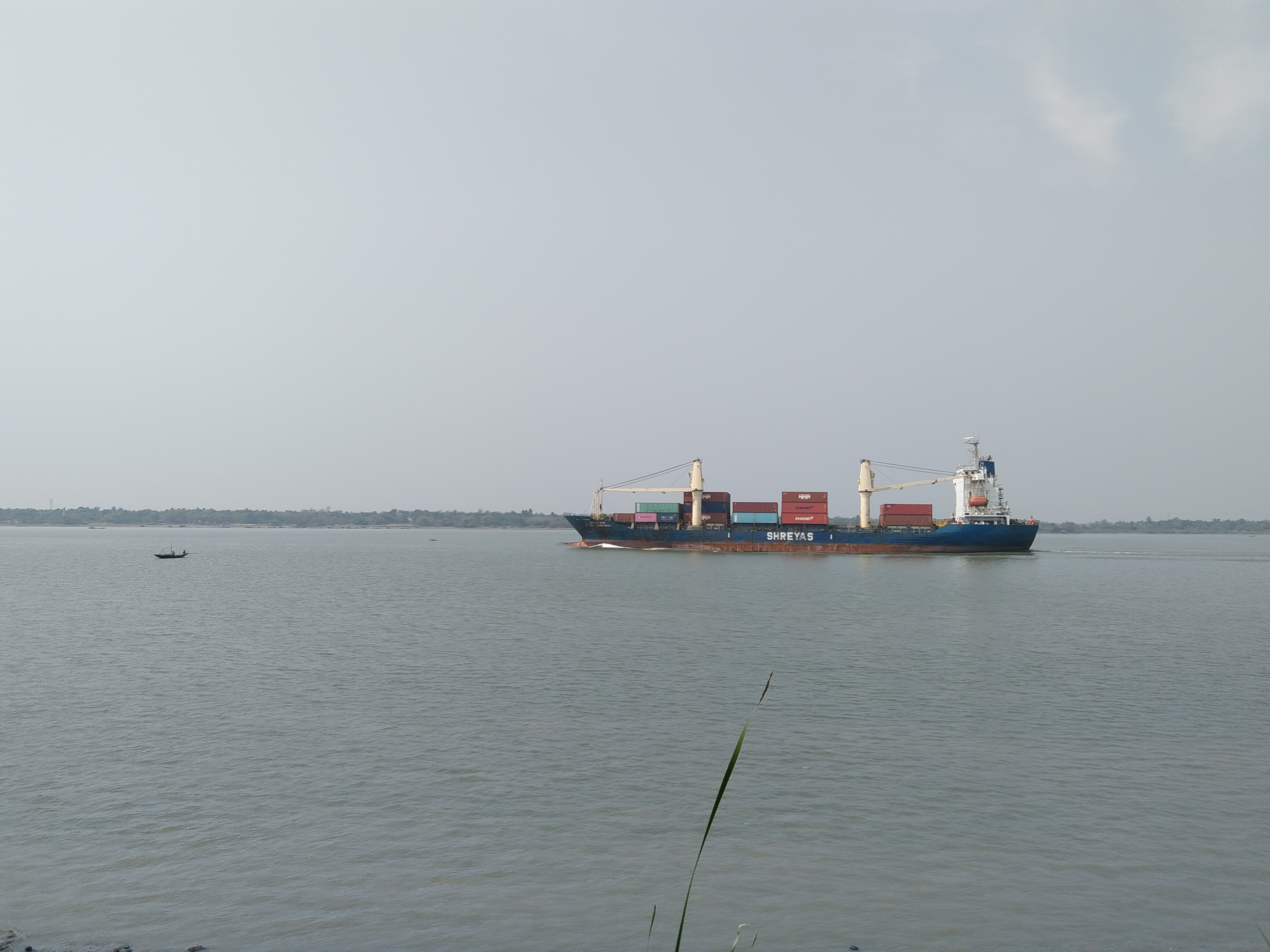
Kolkata bound container ship – SSL Chennai.

Due to the constraints of the river (like silting, sandbars etc.) no seagoing vessel above 200 GT is allowed to navigate without a qualified pilot of the Kolkata Port Trust. The total pilotage distance to KDS is 223 kilometres (139 mi), comprising 148 kilometres (92 mi) in river and 75 kilometres (47 mi) in sea, and for HDC is 121 kilometres (75 mi), comprising 46 kilometres (29 mi) in river and 75 kilometres (47 mi) in sea. The tides in the river create obstacles to the movement of ships to the port. At spring tides, tidal waves create pressure with height that makes it difficult for a ship to stay or anchor in the river. The tidal rise in the river varies from 4.2 kilometres (2.6 mi) to 6.5 kilometres (4.0 mi) during spring tides. Ships are sheltered at the docks during high tides or spring tides. The Eastern Channel Light Vessel's position for navigation is 21°03'03.12" North Latitude and 88°11'30" East Longitude, and the Western Channel Light Vessel's position is 21°05'03.09" North Latitude and Longitude 87°50" '215.95" East Longitude.

All vessels approaching Sandhead in the vicinity of the Eastern Channel Light Vessels communicate with the pilot station at Sagar Island, designated "Sandheads Pilot" and "VTMS Control" on channels 16 and 68, and should not sail north of latitude 21°00'N without advice. For their journey from the Sandheads to the Sagar and pilot boarding points in Auckland, all vessels are provided with remote pilotage by VTMS guidance. Pilotage upstream of 21°39'02.93" N latitude is compulsory for all ships of 200 GRT and more.

A pilot vessel/station is maintained at Sagar Road. The river pilot takes over the ship from Middleton Point in the channel and proceeds up the river. On arrival at Kolkata (Garden Reach), the River Pilot hands over the handling of the vessel to a Harbor Pilot, who takes the vessel inside the locks of KPD or NSD or to river mooring as required. From the lock, the vessel is guided to a designated berth by a dock pilot. The process is reversed to reach the sea from the dock. At Haldia, the pilot bringing the vessel from Upper Auckland hands over the vessel inside the lock to the dock pilot but for the oil jetties all vessels are moored at the jetty by the same pilot. Recommended draft changes for vessels navigating the channel occur between spring tides and low tides, and draft forecasts for inbound and outbound vessels are published by the Harbor Master (river) approximately four/six weeks in advance.

==== Navigational Aids ====
===== Automatic Tide Gauges, and River Marks and Buoys =====
All Automatic Tide Gauges in the channel are operated and maintained by the port. These tide gauges are located near Garden Reach and Diamond Harbor on the east bank of the channel and Haldia on the west bank. For the round-the-clock recording of tidal data, which is used for the prediction of tides and preparation of tide tables by Survey of India.

A total of 500 (of which 140 are lighted) River Marks and Buoys are maintained by the KoPT. These are extremely useful in facilitating night navigation, pilotage and dredging. These lights are operated either by grid electricity, by battery or by dissolved Marine Acetylene Gas. There is also 1 boat buoy, 30 lighted buoys and 72 unlit buoys marking the navigational channel from Sandheads to Kolkata. It has one of the longest navigational channels in the world.

===== Lighthouse =====
- Sagar Lighthouse is situated at Middleton Point on the Sagar Island 1.5 kilometres (0.93 mi) inshore. It is visible from a distance of 28 kilometres (17 mi) in clear weather.
- Dariapur Lighthouse is situated on the right bank of Hooghly River south of Rasulpur river and about 2.7 kilometres (1.7 mi) inshore. It is visible from a distance of 35 kilometres (22 mi) in clear weather.

===== Light Vessels =====
There are five unmanned light vessels, located south of the Sagar lighthouse. These unmanned light-vessels help vessels navigating the channel safely from the sandheads to the Sagar. There are five unmanned light vessels on the south towards of the Sagar lighthouse are the U.G.L.F. located at 21°29′51″N and 88°06′36.5″E, L.G.L.F. located at 21°21'54" N and 088°09'34" E, Talent WK L.V. located at 21°21'54" N and 088°09'34" E, Eastern Channel L.V. located at 21°17'00" N and 088°11'25" E, and Western Channel L.V located at 21°05'002" N and 087°50'24.8" E.

===== Semaphores =====
These are maintained at Akra, Moyapur, Hooghly Point, Balari, Gangra and Sagar for displaying rises of tide for the convenience of various vessels navigating, dredging and surveying in the River Hooghly. The semaphores used to display the tide level at these localities on a mast by the position of the meter and decimeter arms which were manually rotated with the rise and fall of every decimeter of tidal level. However these semaphores are no longer functional and instead, tidal levels are broadcast over VHF radio every half an hour from all the above stations except at Balari.

===== Differential Global Positioning System =====
In the wide estuary, position fixing with reference to shore objects to be viewed from the deck of a vessel, is very difficult. In 1983 KoPT introduced the Electronic Position Fixing System "Syledis" for position fixing of the vessels plying in the wide estuary of the Hooghly River. The shore-based Syledis Position Fixing System was functioning round the clock with the help of the Syledis Stations located at Haldia, Raichak, Dadanpatra Bar and Frazergunj. The system was effectively used for the purpose of hydrographic survey and dredging. KoPT has now replaced the Syledis Position Fixing System by Differential GPS (Differential Global Position Fixing System). This latest state-of the art technology provides improved location accuracy of up to 10 cm.

== Connectivity ==
=== Railway ===
==== Kolkata Dock System Railway (KDS Railway) ====
KDS Railway was set up to cater to the traffic needs for docks, warehouses in the vicinity and various public and private sidings located around the Kolkata docks system. It works as a terminal agent of Indian Railways and operationally under Sealdah Division of Eastern Railway. KDS Rly has a working Agreement with Eastern Railway and render services to the users on behalf of them. Though KDS railway initially had many interfaces with Eastern Railway/South Eastern Railway and covered a wide range of area including Chitpur, Shalimar, and Garden Reach, at present its operation is truncated in the dock area only with the sole marshalling yard at East Dock Junction (EJC). The total track length of KDS railway is about 18 km (11 mi).

It is connected with Eastern Railway through the Majerhat railway station. Indian Railways bring traffic for KDS through full fledged goods trains (rakes) in the East Dock Junction (EJC), by their locomotives. Thereafter KDS railway, after necessary documentation and certain mechanical work, place the trains in the respective handling points (inside docks or private sidings), in full or installments as per operational feasibility. After completion of loading/unloading operation at Sheds/Docks/sidings etc, the rakes are hauled out and outward trains are formed at the marshalling yard (EJC). Again, after documentation, the outward rakes are dispatched by the locomotives provided by Eastern Railway.

==== Haldia Dock Complex Railway (HDC Railway) ====
HDC Railway was established to cater to the traffic demand for warehouses and sidings of Haldia Dock Complex. HDC Railway consists of 115 kilometres (71 mi) track with 11.5 kilometres (7.1 mi) track and 2 yards. The freight trains are operated by 12 locomotives under the Railways, and have an annual freight capacity of 30 million metric tonnes. It is connected by fully electrified single line corridor at Gaurich with South Eastern Railway near Durgachak Town railway station of Panshkura-Haldia broad gauge railway section. This railway system has general marshalling yards and bulk handling yards.

=== Road ===
The Kolkata dock system (KDS) is connected to roads under the Kolkata Municipal Corporation. Major congestion and traffic jams are seen on the narrow roads for vehicular movement in and out of the KDS. KDP and NSD are located about 10 km from the junction of National Highway 16 and National Highway 19. The junction of National Highway 12 and Airport Road is about 25 km from the dock area. Diamond Harbor Road, Taratala Road and Garden Reach Road (Peripheral Road) are 4-lane, and have been strengthened and upgraded, but are often congested due to the simultaneous movement of local and cargo traffic.

Haldia Dock Complex is directly connected to National Highway 116 (Old, NH-41). This National Highway connects with National Highway 16 (Old, NH-6) part of Golden Quadrilateral at Kolaghat, which making the dock complex accessible to other states of the country including Odisha, Jharkhand.

=== Waterway ===
The Kolkata Dock System and Haldia Dock Complex are directly connected to National Waterway 1, which provides the port with waterway connectivity to North India. This waterway transports goods directly from Port of Kolkata to Varanasi and Sahebganj terminals. Besides, it is connected with the river ports of Bangladesh and North-Eastern Indian state of Assam through National Waterway 97.

== Passenger services ==
There are various passenger cruise services from Kolkata port. Most of international passenger cruises stopped their services due to the aviation sector.

=== Domestic ===
- Port Blair, Andaman and Nicobar Islands
- Varanasi, Uttar Pradesh
- Murshidabad, West Bengal
- Gangasagar, West Bengal

=== International ===
- Dhaka, Bangladesh

== Statistics ==
In the fiscal year 2013–14, Port of Kolkata handled 41.386 million metric tons (45.620 million short tons) of cargo. This is significantly less than 53.143 million metric tons (58.580 million short tons) of cargo it handled in 2005–06. However, the number of vessels handled at Kolkata Port during 2013–2014 was the highest among all Indian Major Ports. KoPT handled 17.1% of the total number of vessels, which worked at Indian Major Ports in 2011–2012; significant improvement over 2011–12 which was 16%. During the fiscal year 2011–2012, 3183 vessels called at KoPT.

The average turn around time per vessel was 4.18 days for Kolkata Dock System and 3.37 for Haldia Dock Complex.

Operational Indicators of Port of Kolkata
Category	2014–15	2013–14	2012–13	2011–12	Unit
Containers (number)	630,094	562,020	600,426	552,241	TEUs
Import Cargo	36.25	27.42	27.02	27.97	million metric tonnes
Export Cargo	10.05	13.96	12.91	15.28	million metric tonnes
Passenger Traffic	39,552	42,514	40,349	52,239	
Number of Ships Handled	3,230	3,225	N/A	N/A	

Financial Indicators of Port of Kolkata
Category	2014–15	2013–14	2012–13	2011–12	2010–11
Operating Income	₹18.68 billion (US$190 million)	₹18.96 billion (US$200 million)	₹14.02 billion (US$150 million)	₹16.93 billion (US$180 million)	₹16.07 billion (US$170 million)
Operating Expenditure	₹19.36 billion (US$200 million)	₹19.66 billion (US$200 million)	₹17 billion (US$180 million)	₹15.55 billion (US$160 million)	₹14.63 billion (US$150 million)
Net Surplus	₹−685 million (US$−7.1 million)	₹−702 million (US$−7.3 million)	₹−2.98 billion (US$−31 million)	₹1.38 billion (US$14 million)	₹1.44 billion (US$15 million)

== Gallery ==
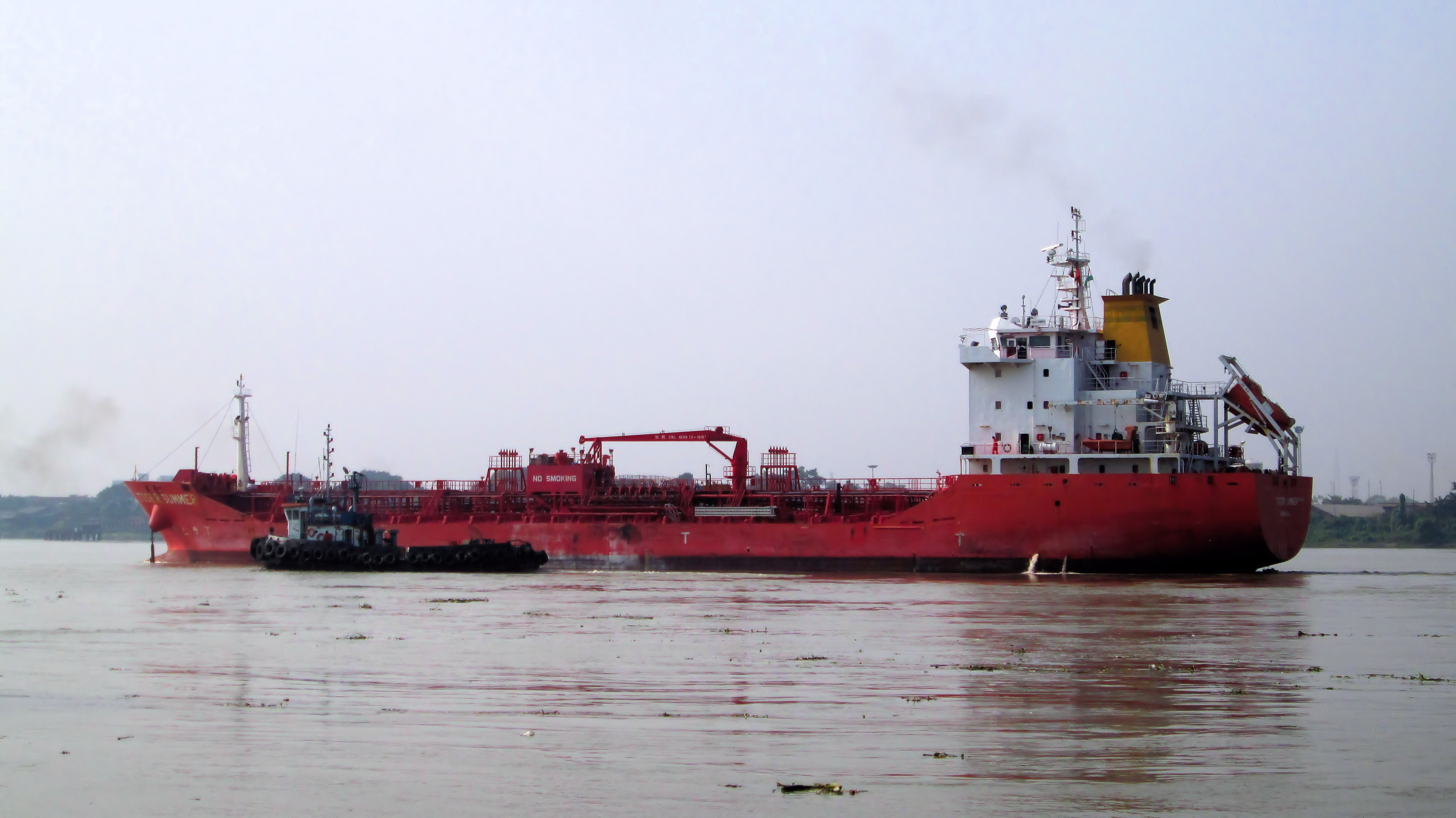
A Ship in the Hooghly River, the approache channel of the Port of Kolkata

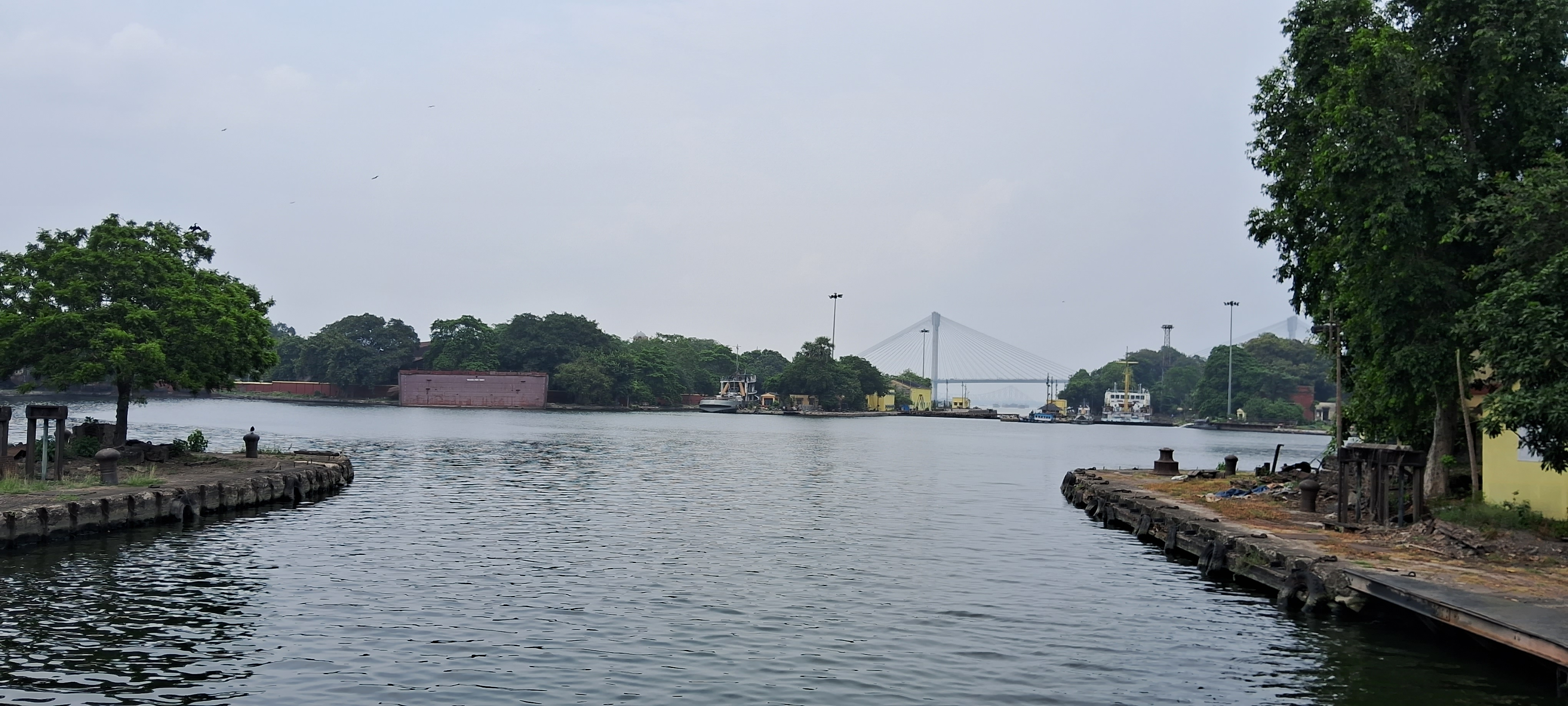
Tidal Basin of Kidderpore Dock

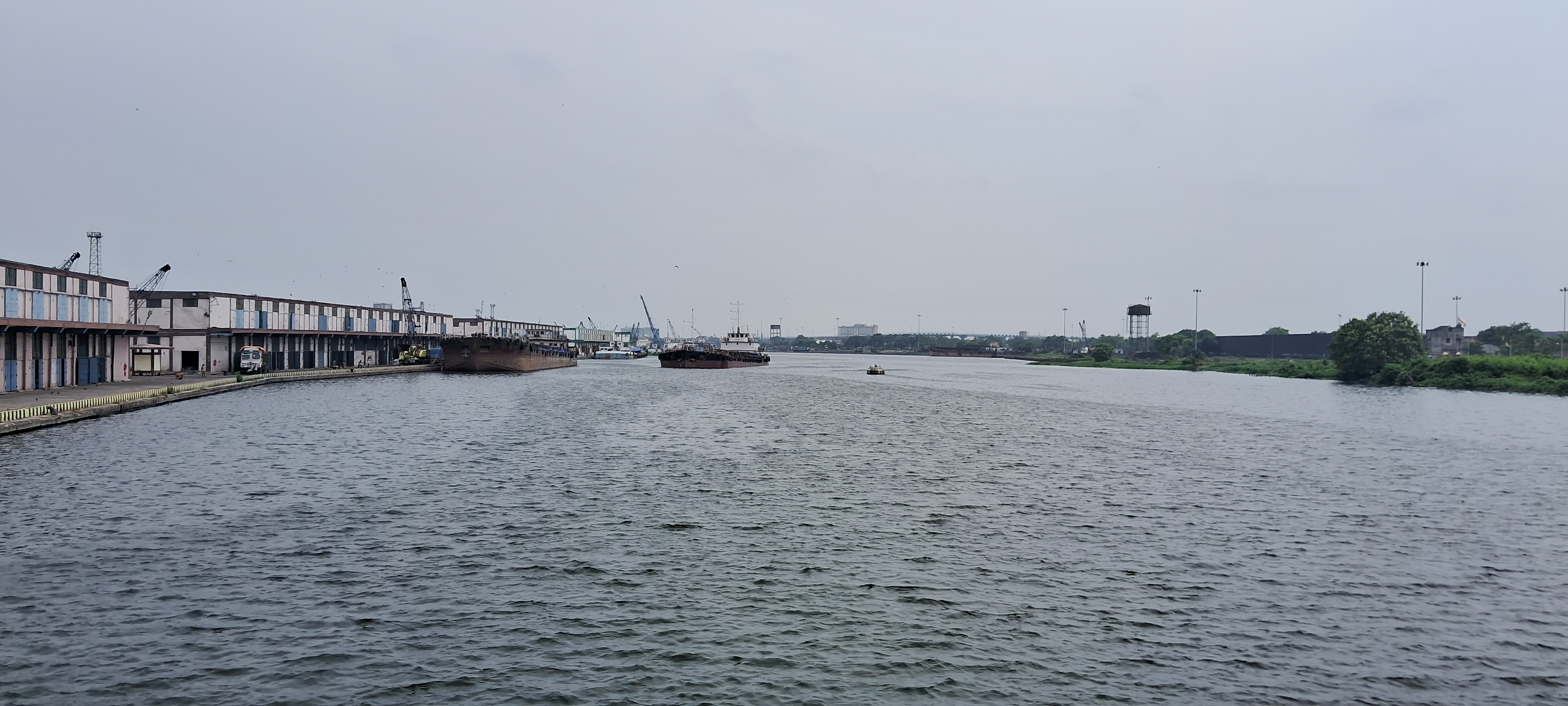
View of Eastern part (KDP-2) of Kidderpore Dock

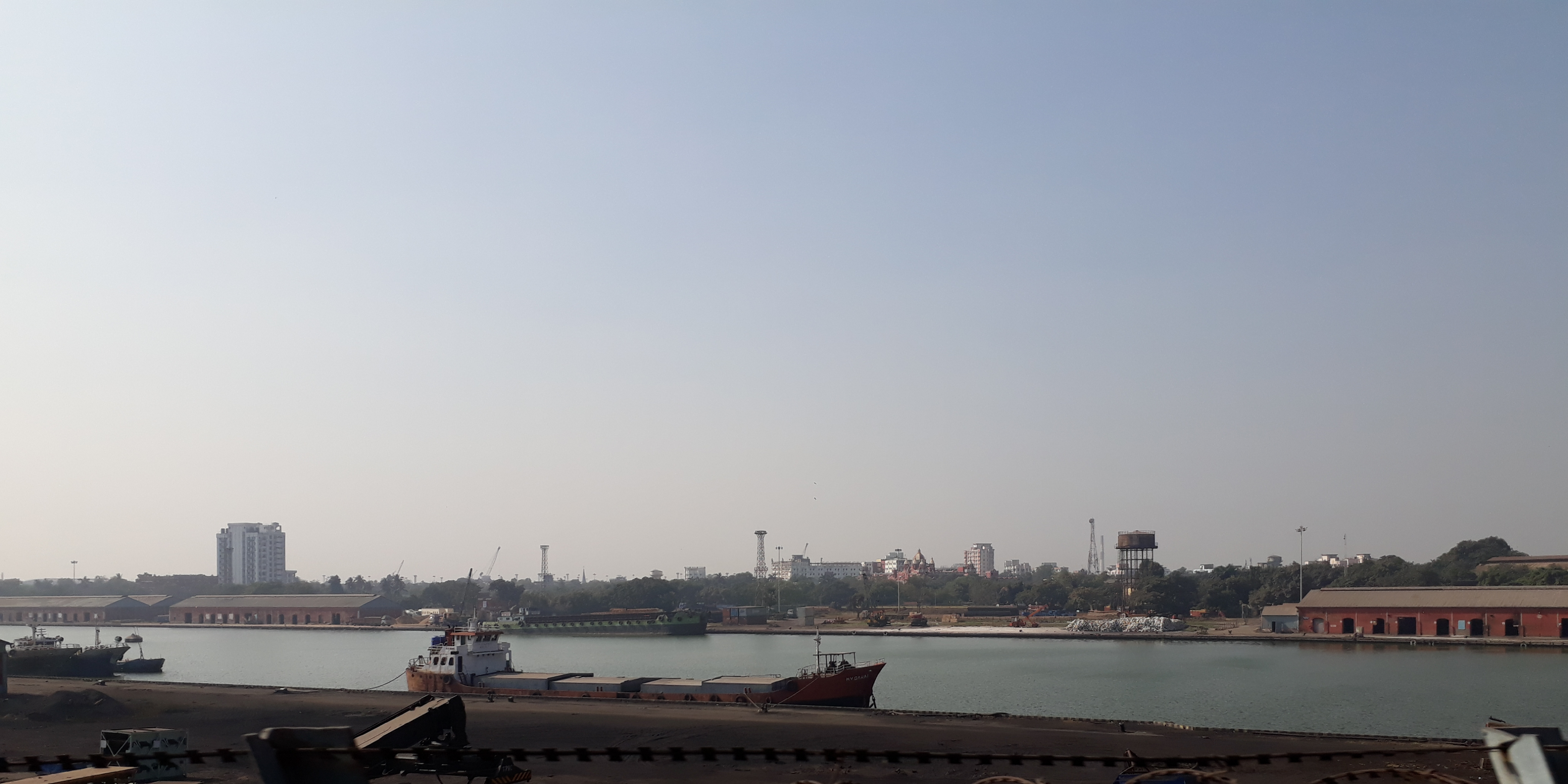
Kidderpore Dock of the Port of Kolkata

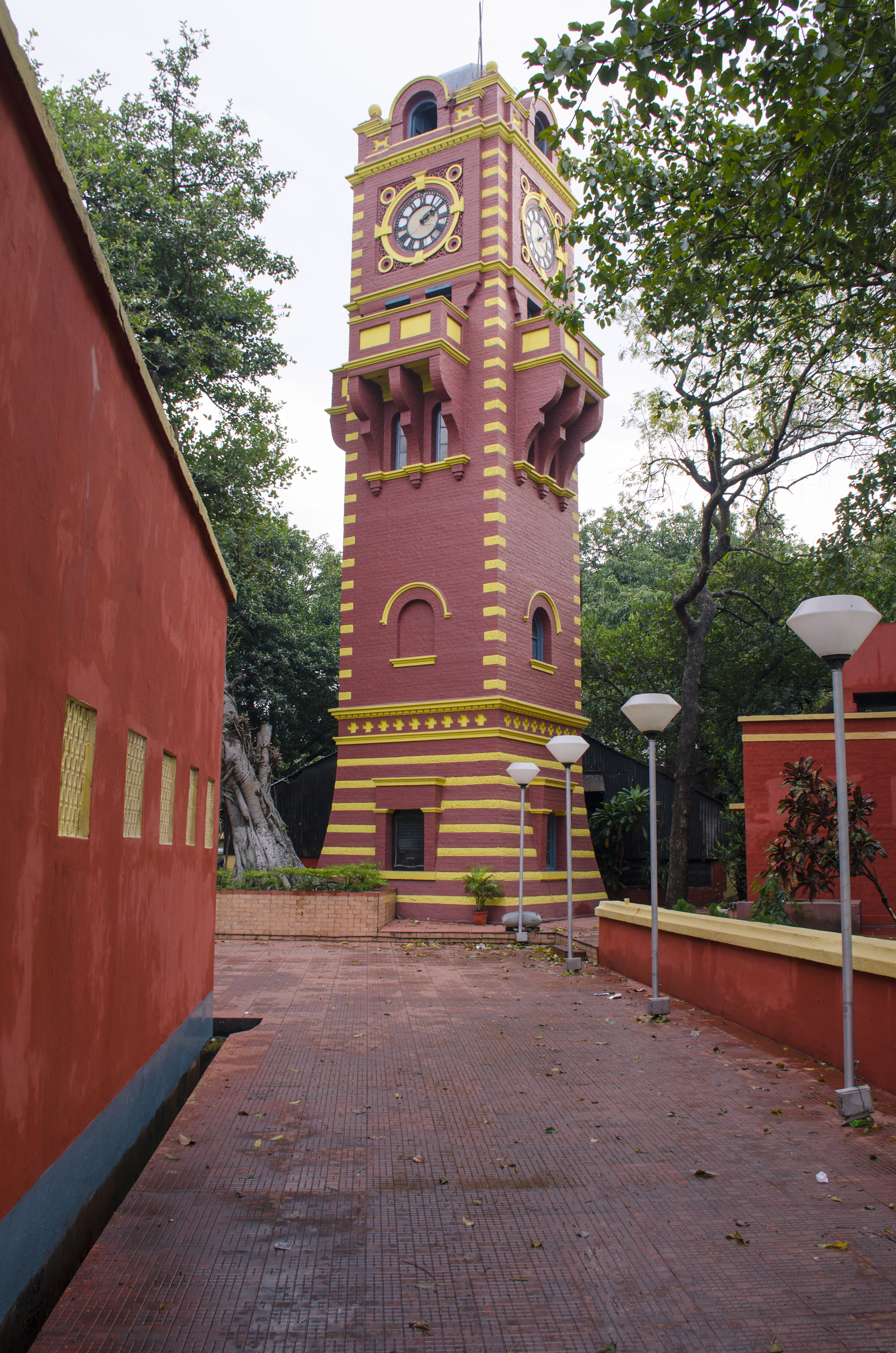
Clock Tower Kidderpore Dock

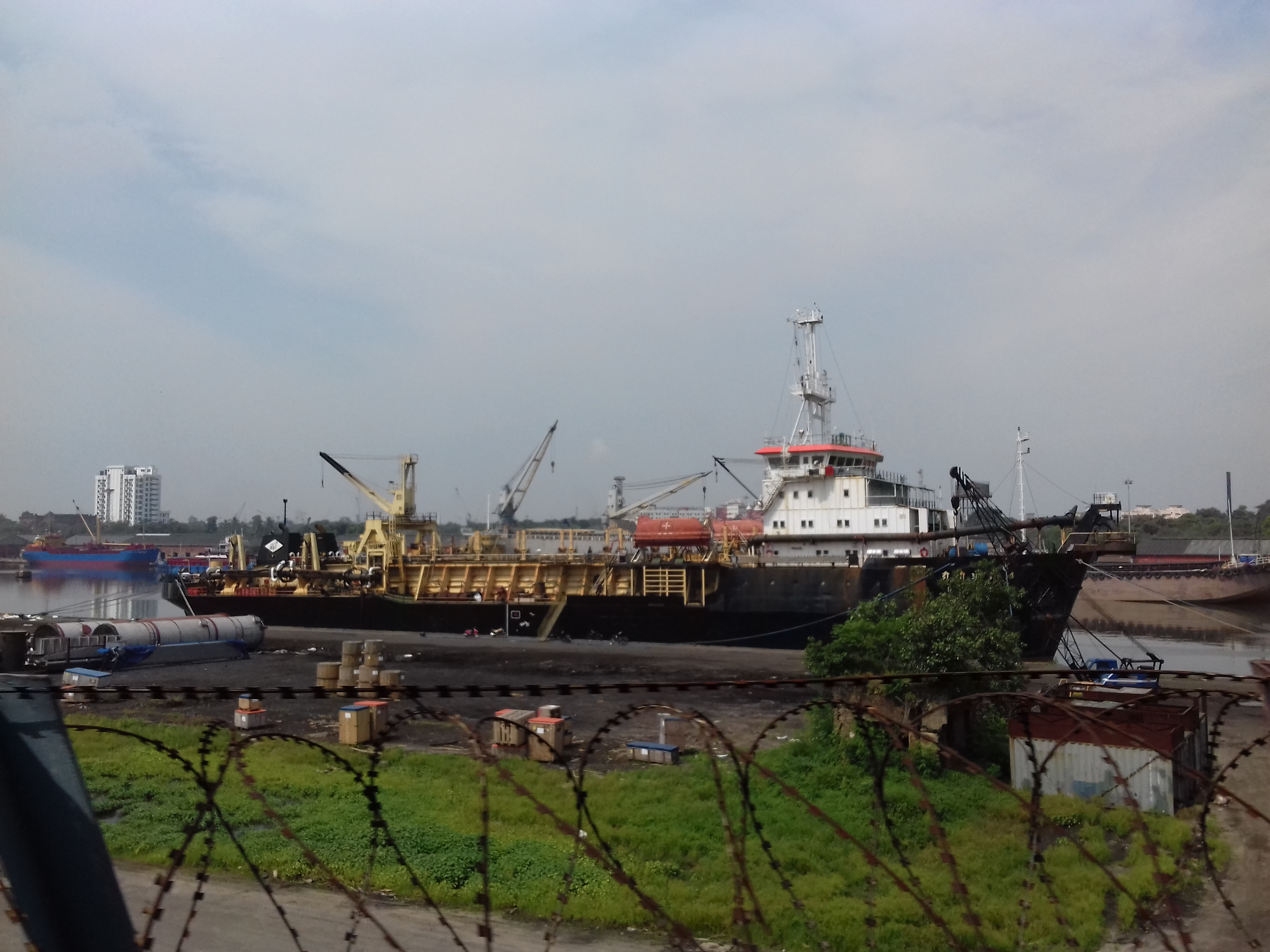
A ship berthing at the western part (KPD-1) of Kidderpore Dock.

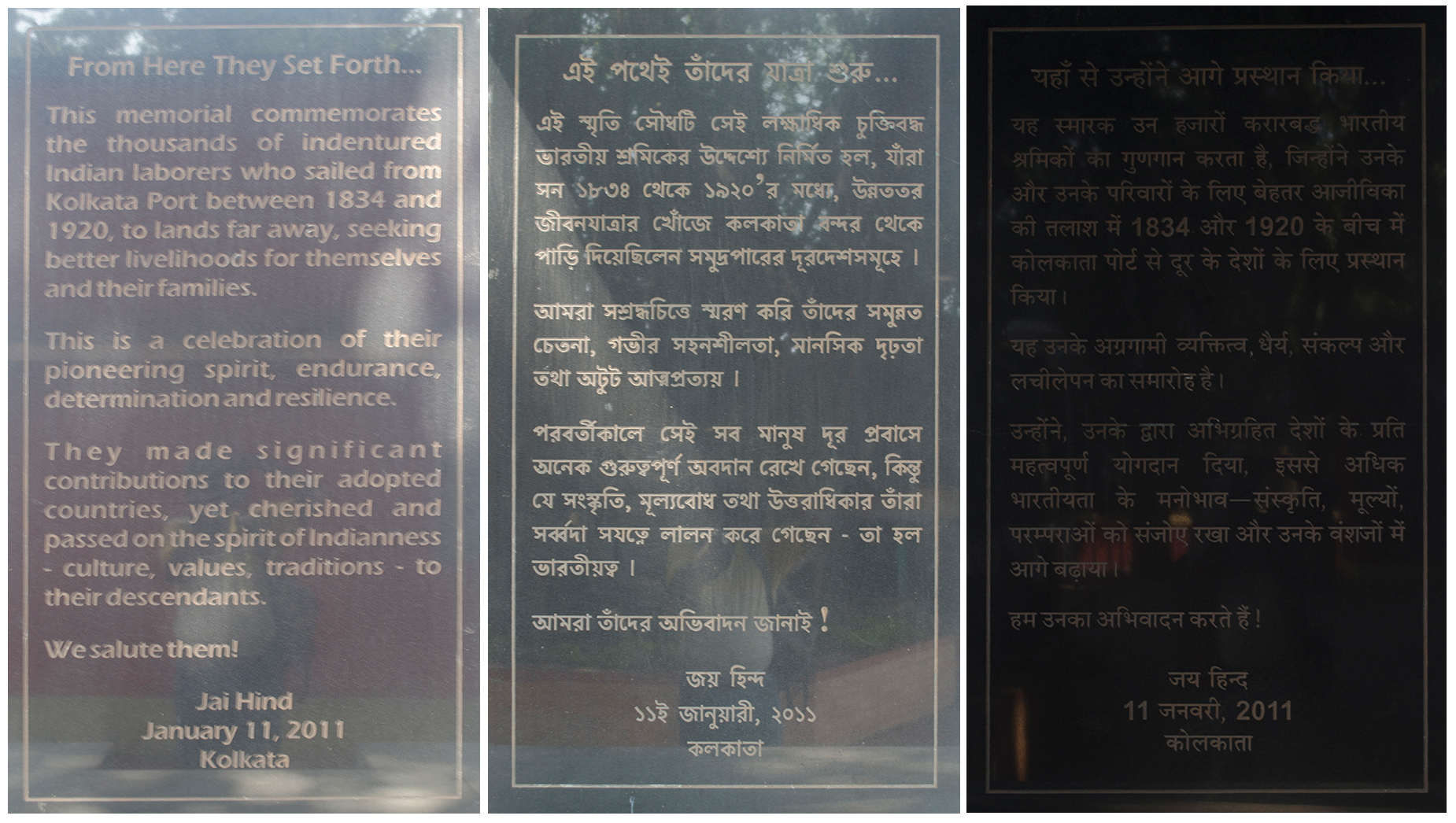
Plaques of Indenture Memorial, Kidderepore

== See also ==
- Farakka Port
- Ports in India
- Ports in West Bengal
- Sagar Port
- Tajpur Port
