= Madan Singh-class tugboat =

Series of Indian Navy tugboats

External image
- Madan Singh-class tugboat
- 25 T BP Voith Tug

The Madan Singh class of tugboats are series of service watercraft built by Tebma Shipyard Limited (a subsidiary of Bharati Shipyard Ltd), for Indian Navy during 1999. Propulsion is provided by Voith Schneider Propellers. The Nakul-class tugboat is a follow-up order of the Madan Singh-class tugboat.

== Ships of the class ==
Name	Date of commission	IMO Number
INS Madan Singh	1999	9177739
INS Shambhu Singh	1999	9177753

== Specifications ==
- Displacement: 382 tonnes
- Length: 32.5 meters
- Breadth: 9.50 meters
- Depth: 4 meters
- Speed: 12 knots
- Bollard pull: 25 tons
- Main engines: Wartsila 8 L20
- Power output: 2 x 1320 kW at 1000 RPM

== See also ==
- Tugboats of the Indian Navy
