= Nakul-class tugboat =

Indian Navy Tugboat class

External images
- Nakul Class
- INS Nakul
- INS Arjun
- 25 T BP Voith Tug(Nakul)

The Nakul class of tugboats are series of service watercraft built by Tebma Shipyard Limited. (a subsidiary of Bharati Shipyard Ltd), for Indian navy during 2004. The vessels in the class have a rated capacity of 25 ton bollard pull. Propulsion is provided by Voith Schneider Propellers. It is a follow-up of Madan Singh class tugboat.

== Ships in the class ==
| Name | Date of commission | IMO number |
|---|---|---|
| INS Nakul | | |
| INS Arjun | 2004 | 9069669 |

== Specifications ==
The specifications are from the website of the manufacturer Tebma Shipyard Ltd.

- Length: 32.5 m
- Breadth: 9.50 m
- Depth: 4 m
- Speed: 12 knots
- Bollard pull: 25 tonnes
- Displacement: 373.14 tonnes
- Draft: 2.8 m
- Output :2 x 1320 kW
- Main engines: Wartsila 8 L20

== See also ==
- Tugboats of the Indian Navy
