= INS Poshak =

India barge

History

India
- Name: Poshak
- Builder: Shalimar Works, Kolkata
- Commissioned: 18 June 2012

General characteristics
- Type: Fuel carrier barge
- Tonnage: 647 GT; 195 NT; 650 DWT
- Displacement: 1100 tonnes
- Length: 49.6 m (163 ft)
- Beam: 10.52 m (34.5 ft)
- Draught: 3.25 m (10.7 ft)
- Installed power: 2014 kW; Auxiliary Power: 2 x 122 kW 415 V 50 Hz AC
- Propulsion: Caterpillar
- Speed: 14.5 knots (26.9 km/h; 16.7 mph)
- Crew: 13, with room for 30

INS Poshak is a self-propelled fuel carrier barge built by M/s Shalimar Works, Kolkata for the Indian Navy.

== Description ==
It is an auxiliary ship capable to carry 500 tonnes of fuel. It has seagoing capabilities and have all essential communication and navigation equipment. The vessel is classed under IRS (No: 39518) with Class notation : +SUL, for carriage of oil with flash point above 60 Degree.

INS Poshak is named after a previous auxiliary vessel of same name which served the Indian Navy. It was delivered to the Indian Navy on 18 June 2012. Poshak is first of a series of two barges being built by the Shalimar Works (1980) Ltd. M/s Shalimar Works secured the contract in November 2007 to manufacture two barges at a cost of INR 13.95 crores per barge. The basic design, detail construction design and consultancy for test and trial was provided by M/s Marine Consultants, Selimpur Road Kolkata.

== Specifications ==
- Gross weight: 647 tonnes
- Net weight: 195 tonnes
- Dead weight: 650 tonnes
- Displacement: 1100 tonnes
- Overall length : 49.6 meters
- Beam: 10.52 meters
- Draught (max): 3.25 meters
- Power: 2014 kW
- Engine: Caterpillar
- Auxiliary power: 2 x 122 kW 415 V 50 Hz AC
- Speed : 14.5 Knots

== See also ==
- INS Purak
- INS Puran
- Hooghly class fuel barge
- Ambika-class replenishment ship
