= Vipul shipyard =

Shipbuilding works at Magdalla Port, Surat district, Gujarat

Coordinates: 21.1389255°N 72.7377396°E

The Vipul shipyard is a shipbuilding works at Magdalla Port in the Surat district of Gujarat.

As of 2007, the works consisted of a slipway and 100 meters of waterfront spread across 8 acres of land. In May 2007, the ABG Shipyard Limited signed a memorandum of understanding (MOU) for its acquisition. In August 2007, the acquisition was completed and thus Vipul Shipyard gained control of the ABG shipyard. After acquisition, a further contiguous 12 acres was added to it. This led to an increase in the waterfront by 200 meters. The works is now also referred as "ABG shipyard unit-II."

== See also ==
- Vipul-class barge, built for the Indian Navy

=== Peers ===
- Anderson Marine
- Tebma Shipyard Limited
