= Dredger 1 =

Dredger of the Indian Navy

Class overview
- Builders: Tebma Shipyard Limited
- Operators: India
- In commission: 17 May 2015

General characteristics
- Type: Grab-hopper Dredger ship
- Length: 44.15 m (144 ft 10 in)
- Beam: 3.8 m (12 ft 6 in)
- Draught: 2.9 m (9 ft 6 in)
- Propulsion: 2 × Cummins KTA38-M 1000 Hp Engines
- Capacity: 300 cubic metres dredged material

The first exclusively owned dredger ship of its type in the Indian Navy; the indigenously built ship is meant for dredging the various navy ports. The ship was designed to meet precise deepening requirements around the dockyard and port installations and in riverine or other places where deepening is needed. The ship which can hold up to 300 cubic metres or 500 tons of dredged material, has a set of 8 openable hopper bottom doors for disposal of dredged material out at sea. The main equipment of the ship is a 320-HP Cummins-855-powered forward-mounted crane supplied by Titagarth Wagons. The crane’s 15.2-meter boom has a working radius of 12 meters and hoisting capacity of 10.5 metric tons at a 46-degree boom angle. The crane’s grab bucket has 3-cubic-meter capacity and holds up to 4.5 metric tons of dredged material; and is capable of dredging up to depths of 10 meters.

Built by Tebma Shipyard Limited, the ship based out of Mumbai has a 90% locally sourced content, much more than the usual 50% thanks to the Make in India initiative started by PM Narendra Modi. The dredger built at Tebma's Malpe facility in Karnataka is a self-propelled grab-hopper dredger that can discharge dredged material through eight hopper doors controlled by hydraulic rams and chains over pulley out at sea. Grab-hopper dredgers generally produce minimal turbidity and less disturbance to marine ecosystem.

Indian Navy which used to outsource its dredging operations had floated a tender for its 1st exclusively owned dredger in 2012, and Tebma shipyard had won the bid in 2013. This dredger is the 22nd vessel built by the company for the Indian Navy, having previously supplied tugs and special purposes barges.

== See also ==
- List of active Indian Navy ships
