= INS Ambuda (2010) =

India barge

INS Ambuda (Literally means Cloud) is a self-propelled water carrier barge built by Vipul shipyard Ltd (a subsidiary of ABG Shipyard Ltd) in Surat, Gujarat for the Indian Navy.

== Description ==
The auxiliary ship is 50 metres (164 ft 1 in) long, displaces 930 tonnes and has a capacity for 500 tonnes of water. The barge is powered by two Caterpillar engines with a total output of 1,800 brake horsepower (1,300 kW) and has a top speed of 12 knots (22 km/h; 14 mph). Ambuda has accommodation for 20 crew members and a galley or corridor kitchen facility. It has tank gauging systems, fire fighting equipment and carries a rigid inflatable boat. It has sea-going capability and carries all essential communication and navigation equipment.

INS Ambuda (IR no. 35823) is one of the five water barges built by Vipul Shipyard as per the contract concluded in February 2006. It was commissioned on 11 October 2010 by Commodore Ajay Kumar Sinha, Chief Staff Officer (Technical), Southern Naval Command at South Jetty, Naval Base. It is named after a previous auxiliary vessel, INS Ambuda which served the Indian Navy for more than four decades and was decommissioned in February 2007. INS Pamba (IR no. 38186) and INS Pulakesin-1 (IR no. 40373) are her sister ships which were commissioned on 29 March 2011 and 21 September 2011 respectively.

External images
- INS Ambuda
- INS Ambuda induction
- INS Ambuda induction

== Specifications ==
- Gross weight: 598 tonnes
- Displacement: 1042 tonnes
- Overall length: 50.2 meters
- Draught (max): 2.9 meters
- Main engine: 1342 kW
- Auxiliary generator: 1 x 36 kW 415 V 50 Hz AC; 2 x 86 kW 415 V 50 Hz AC
