= INS Pulakesin-1 =

India barge

INS Pulakesin-1 is a self-propelled water carrier barge built by Vipul Shipyard Ltd. (a subsidiary of ABG Shipyard Ltd) in Surat, Gujarat for the Indian Navy. It is named of King Pulakeshin I of the Chalukya dynasty.

== Description ==
The auxiliary ship is 50 metres (164 ft 1 in) long, displaces 930 tonnes and has a capacity to carry 500 tonnes of water. The barge is powered by two engines with a total output of 1,800 brake horsepower (1,300 kW) and has a top speed of 12 knots (22 km/h; 14 mph). Pulakesin-1 has accommodation for 20 crew members and a galley or corridor kitchen facility. It has tank gauging systems, fire fighting equipment and carries a rigid hull inflatable boat. It has sea going capabilities and all of the essential communication and navigation equipment.

Pulakesin-1 (IR Number:40373) is one of the five water barges built by Vipul Shipyard, as per the contract concluded in February 2006. It was commissioned by Commodore S. Nedunchezian, Chief Staff Officer (Technical), Southern Naval Command at South Jetty, Kochi Naval Base, on 21 September 2011. INS Ambuda (IR no. 35823) and INS Pamba (IR no. 38186) are her sister ships, and they were commissioned on 11 October 2010 and 29 March 2011 respectively.

External image
- INS Pulakesin-1
- INS Pulakesin-1 Induction

== Specifications ==
- Gross Tonnage: 598 tonnes
- Displacement: 1042.634 tonnes
- Overall Length: 50.2 m
- Beam: 11 m
- Draught (max): 2.9 m
- Power installed: 1342 kW Caterpillar
- Auxiliary power: 1x36 kW 415 V 50 Hz AC, 2x86 kW 415 V 50 Hz AC
- Speed: 12 knots

== See also ==
- INS Purak
- INS Pamba
- Arga-class tugboat
