= Ratanpar =

Ratanpar, Surendranagar
- Town
- Location in Gujarat, India Ratanpar, Surendranagar (India)
- Coordinates: 22°42′45″N 71°38′6″E
- Country: India
- State: Gujarat
- District: Surendranagar City

Government
  - Body: surendranagar-dudhrej- wadhwan urban development authority
- Elevation: 108 m (354 ft)

Population
  - Total: 5,000+

Languages
  - Official: Gujarati (State), Hindi (Federal)
- Time zone: UTC+5:30 (IST)
- PIN: 363020
- Telephone code: 02755
- Vehicle registration: GJ13
- Nearest cities: Joravarnagar, Wadhwan, Surendranagar (Old City)
- Climate: Dry almost (Köppen)
- Website: gujaratindia.com

Ratanpar is a Town/Residential Area in the Surendranagar City of the Indian state of Gujarat.

Ratanpar's Postal Index Number code is 363020 and the postal head office is Surendranagar.
