= Syledis =

Syledis (SYstem LEger pour mesure la DIStance) was a terrestrial radio navigation and locating system. The system operated in the UHF segment of 420-450 MHz. It was manufactured in France by Sercel S.A., headquarters Carquefou, and was operational during the 1980s and until about 1995, providing positioning and navigational support for the petroleum sector in the North Sea and to other scientific projects. Syledis has been replaced by GPS.

== Functioning ==
Determination of the position of mobile vehicles, like f.e. vessels, using Syledis is accomplished by measurement of transit time of radio waves between mobiles and radio stations at known points. There are two modes of operation, active range mode and passive pseudo-range mode.

=== Further explanation of the functioning of the Syledis positioning system ===
A vessel is equipped with a transmitter that transmits a coded signal to at least three radio beacons each placed at a known point. The beacons send the code back to the transmitter. The returned coded signal is placed in a timeslot to determine the origin of the returned code. Therefore, in an earlier stage a specified timeslot is connected to a specific beacon.

The elapsed time is proportional to twice the distance between the transmitter and the beacons. After the distance to the beacons is derived the position of the vessel can be calculated. The transmitter computes the distances to the beacons and a computer, connected with the transmitter, computes the position of the vessel.

==== Possible causes for measurement inaccuracy ====
The Syledis system has a measurement sensitivity that can be expressed in centimeters. Due to weather conditions the wave propagation speed, for electromagnetic waves in air almost the speed of light, can change. In wet conditions, rain or snow, the wave propagation is a little bit slower than in dry conditions. So that gives an inaccuracy in determining the correct position of the vessel.

Another important factor is the length of the cables used to connect the antennas with the radio beacons at the shore, for example placed on lighthouses, or on oil rig platforms and the cable(s) to connect the antenna with the transmitter at the vessel. Normally the antenna will be placed at the top of the mast and the transmitter will be placed in the wheelhouse, where the captain and the mate can see the displays of the transmitter. Those cables has to be calibrated in order to obtain the smallest possible measurement uncertainty.
