= INS Ambuda (1966) =

INS Ambuda was a self-propelled water carrier barge built by M/s Garden Reach Workshops Ltd, Kolkata, for Indian Navy.

INS Ambuda had a rated capacity to carry 200 ton of fresh water and was designed by Central Design Organisation (CDO) of Directorate of Naval Construction (DNC). It was one of the first Indian navy vessel to be designed in India after independence. It was commissioned on 31-3-1966 and was decommissioned in February 2007 after serving for over 40 years. Ambuda means Cloud in vernacular language.
