= Tebma Shipyard Limited =

Indian shipbuilding company

Tebma Shipyards Limited is a Chennai based shipbuilding company in India. The company has delivered more than 150 vessels, mainly offshore support vessels. It was shut down in June 2021 due to various reasons.

== History ==
Tebma was incorporated in 1984 and commenced operations in 1987. Tebma Shipyard Limited is now known as Udupi Cochin Shipyard Limited, operating as a wholly-owned subsidiary of Cochin Shipyard Limited. [1] It has units at Malpe, Hangarakatte, Bhaputhota in Karnataka, Inside Cochin Shipyard Limited, Kochi in Kerala and Chengalpet in Tamil Nadu. On 24 November 2010, Bharati Shipyard acquired a 51 per cent stake in the Tebma Shipyards for a price of ₹757.5 million (US$8 million) through a fresh issue of capital at a price of Rs 19.20 per share (face value of Rs 10). Tebma in 2011 signed a deal with Vosta LMG, one of the world's largest dredging technology firm, to build dredgers. In 2015, it delivered Dredger 1; the 1st dredger for exclusive use by Indian Navy The yard is acquired by Cochin Shipyard Limited, Kochi in 2021. Acquired by Cochin Shipyard Limited in September 2020 through an NCLT Chennai order, and officially renamed to Udupi Cochin Shipyard Limited on April 22, 2022.

== Products ==
It is primarily engaged in the design and construction of offshore support vessels, tugboats, dredgers, floating cranes and pilot launches.

- Arga Class tugboat
- Nakul class tugboat
- Bhim class tugboat
- Madan Singh Class tugboat
- B.C. Dutt class tugboat
- Fugro Voyager
- Fugro Scout
- Mokul Nordic
