= Arga-class tugboat =

Class overview
- Name: Arga class
- Operators: Indian Navy
- Planned: 6
- Completed: 3

General characteristics
- Type: Tugboat
- Tonnage: 181 GT; 35.52 DWT
- Displacement: 239.48 tonnes
- Length: 22.8 m (74 ft 10 in)
- Beam: 7.42 m (24 ft 4 in)
- Draft: 2.35 m (7 ft 9 in)
- Propulsion: 850 hp (630 kW) Caterpillar Kirloskar engines
- Speed: 12 knots (22 km/h; 14 mph)

The Arga class of tugboats are a series of six service watercraft being built by Tebma Shipyard Limited (a subsidiary of Bharati Shipyard Ltd) in Malpe, for the Indian Navy.

== Description ==
Each vessel in the series is 22.8 meters (74 ft 10 in) long and 7.42 meters (24 ft 4 in) wide with a draft forward (bow) of 2.35 meters (7 ft 9 in). Each tug has a capacity of 10 tonnes bollard pull at 85 per cent maximum continuous rating (MCR), speed of 12 knots at 85 per cent MCR and is fitted with two 850-horsepower (630 kW) Caterpillar Kirloskar engines, coupled to two steerable rudder propellers of 1,350 mm (53 in) diameter. The vessels have two auxiliary electrical generation plant of 60 kW each and are fitted with a sewage treatment plant. They have been designed by M/s Ska Marine, Chennai. INS Arga and INS Bali are named after the coastal villages of Karwar District and both were inducted into the service by Rear Admiral Atul Kumar Jain.

External image
- INS Bali
- INS Bali induction

== Ships in the class ==
Yard number	IR number	IMO number	Ship name	Launch date	Commissioning date	Home port
145	41949	9600231	INS Arga		1 August 2012	INS Kadamba, Karwar
146	41951	9600243	INS Bali	11 September 2012	28 September 2012	INS Kadamba, Karwar
147	41963	9600255	INS Anup	11 September 2012	28 September 2012	INS Kadamba. Karwar
148						
149						
150						

== See also ==
- Tugboats of the Indian Navy
