= INS Puran =

India barge

History

India
- Name: Puran
- Builder: Modest Infrastructure Ltd, Bhavnagar
- Status: in active service, as of 2012

General characteristics
- Tonnage: 731 Meters
- Displacement: 1152 Tonnes
- Length: 57.3 Meters
- Beam: 11 Meters
- Draught: 2.8 Meters
- Installed power: 1044 KW CUMMINS
- Speed: 12 Knots
- Capacity: 500 tonnes of fuel

INS Puran (Literally means Ancient) is a self-propelled fuel carrier barge built by Modest Infrastructure Ltd in Bhavnagar, Gujarat, for the Indian Navy.

== Description ==
The auxiliary ship has a capacity to carry 500 tonnes of fuel. Purak has sea going capabilities and all of the essential communication and navigation equipment. The wheel house is air conditioned and the vessel is classed under IRS (No:40634) with class notation : +SUL + IY, for carriage of oil with flash point above 60 degree.

Puran is part of a series of five barges being built by the Modest Infrastructure Limited. Its sister ship is INS Purak.

== See also ==
- INS Pamba
- Arga Class Tugboat
