= INS Purak =

Indian Navy auxiliary ship

History

India
- Name: Purak
- Builder: Modest Infrastructure Ltd, Bhavnagar
- Commissioned: 11 April 2012
- Status: Active

General characteristics
- Type: Fuel carrier barge
- Capacity: 500 tonnes of fuel

INS Purak (Literally means Inhalation) is a self-propelled fuel carrier barge built by Modest Infrastructure Ltd in Bhavnagar, Gujarat, for the Indian Navy.

== Description ==
The auxiliary ship has a capacity to carry 500 tonnes of fuel. Purak has sea-going capabilities and all of the essential communication and navigation equipment. The wheel house is air conditioned and the vessel is classed under IRS (No: 40323) with Class notation : +SUL + IY., for carriage of oil with flash point above 60 Degree.

It is named after a previous auxiliary vessel of same name built by Mazagon Dock Limited, Bombay which served the Indian Navy. Purak is part of a series of five barges being built by the Modest Infrastructure Limited. Its sister ship is INS Puran. It was inducted into the Indian Navy on 11 April 2012 at Naval Dockyard, Mumbai by Rear Admiral Deepak Bali, Flag Officer, Doctrine and Concepts, Indian Navy.

== See also ==
- INS Puran
- INS Poshak (Shalimar)
- Ambika class replenishment ship
- Hooghly class fuel barge
