= List of shipbuilders and shipyards =

This is a list of notable shipbuilders and shipyards: Africa

== Africa ==
=== Egypt ===
- Suez shipyard
- Alexandria Shipyard

=== Ghana ===
- Tema Shipyard

== Asia ==
=== Azerbaijan ===
- Baku Shipyard

=== Bangladesh ===
- Radiant Shipyard Limited
- FMC Dockyard Limited
- Ananda Shipyard and Shipways
- Chittagong Dry Dock Limited
- Khulna Shipyard
- Western Marine Shipyard

=== Mainland China ===
- China State Shipbuilding Corporation
- China Shipbuilding Industry Corporation
- Hudong-Zhonghua Shipbuilding
- Dalian Shipbuilding Industry Company
- Guangzhou Shipyard International
- Jiangnan Shipyard
- Yantai Raffles Shipyard

=== Hong Kong ===
- Hongkong United Dockyards

=== India ===
- Mazagon Dock Limited, Mumbai, Maharashtra
- Cochin Shipyard Limited, Kochi, Kerala
- Hindustan Shipyard Limited, Visakhapatnam, Andhra Pradesh
- Garden Reach Shipbuilders and Engineers, Kolkata, West Bengal
- Goa Shipyard Limited, Vasco da Gama, Goa
- Naval Dockyard (Bombay), Mumbai, Maharashtra
- Naval Dockyard (Visakhapatnam), Visakhapatnam, Andhra Pradesh
- Jawaharlal Nehru Port Trust, Navi Mumbai, Maharashtra
- Shalimar Works (1980) Ltd, Kolkata, West Bengal
- Hooghly Dock & Port Engineers Limited, Howrah, West Bengal
- Swan Defence and Heavy Industries Limited, Port Pipavav, Gujarat
- Bharati Defence And Infrastructure Limited, Mumbai, Maharashtra
- ABG Shipyard Limited, Mumbai, Maharashtra
- Hazira Port Private Limited, Hazira, Gujarat
- Adani Katupalli Port Private Limited, Kattupalli, Tamil Nadu
- Modest Infrastructure Ltd, Bhavnagar, Gujarat
- Tebma Shipyard Limited, Chennai, Tamil Nadu
- Timblo Drydocks Private Limited, Curchorem, Goa
- Titagarh Marines, Kolkata, West Bengal
- Western India Shipyard Limited, Mormugao, Goa

=== Indonesia ===
- PT PAL Indonesia
- PT Lundin Industry Invest
- PT Palindo Marine

=== Iran ===
- Sadra Shipyard
- Persian Gulf Shipbuilding

=== Israel ===
- Israel Shipyards
- IAI Ramta

=== Japan ===
- Imabari Shipbuilding Imabari
  - 30% of Japan Marine United – Universal Shipbuilding and IHI Marine United merger in 2013
- Kawasaki Shipbuilding Corporation
- Mitsubishi Heavy Industries (Nagasaki)
  - bought in 2020 Mitsui Engineering & Shipbuilding
- Sumitomo Heavy Industries Oppama

=== Malaysia ===
- Boustead Naval Shipyard Lumut
- Boustead Penang Shipyard Penang Island
- Labuan Shipyard and Engineering Labuan
- Malaysia Marine and Heavy Engineering Pasir Gudang
- Boustead Langkawi Shipyard Langkawi

=== Pakistan ===
- Karachi Shipyard & Engineering Works, Karachi
- PN Dockyard, Karachi

=== Philippines ===
- Austal Philippines Pty. Ltd. (Balamban, Cebu)
- Hanjin Heavy Industries Corporation Philippines (Zambales)
- Keppel Philippines Marine Batangas Shipyard (Bauan, Batangas)
- Keppel Philippines Marine Subic Shipyard (Subic, Zambales)
- Herma Shipyard Inc. (Mariveles, Bataan)

=== Saudi Arabia ===
- King Salman Global Maritime Industries Complex

=== Singapore ===
- ST Engineering Marine
- Strategic Marine (S) Pte Ltd

=== South Korea ===
- Daewoo Shipbuilding & Marine Engineering Co., Ltd. 2023 Hanhwa ocean, Hanhwa group M&A Geoje
- Hanjin Heavy Industries Co., Ltd. HJ shipbuilding, Busan
- Hyundai Heavy Industries Co., Ltd. Ulsan
- Hyundai Mipo Dockyard Co., Ltd. Ulsan
- Hyundai Samho Heavy Industries Co., Ltd. Yeongam near Mokpo, South West Korea.
- K Shipbuilding, Changwon
- Samsung Heavy Industries Co., Ltd. Geoje

=== Sri Lanka ===
- Colombo Dockyard
- Naval Boat Building Yard

=== Taiwan ===
- CSBC Corporation, Taiwan (Kaohsiung)
- Horizon Yachts (Kaohsiung)
- Lungteh Shipbuilding (Yilan)
- Jong Shyn Shipbuilding Company

=== Thailand ===
- Italthai Industrial Group
- The Bangkok Dock Company (Sattahip)

== Europe ==
=== Bulgaria ===
- Odessos Shiprepair yard, Varna

=== Croatia ===
- Brodogradilište 3. Maj Rijeka
- Kraljevica Shipyard Brodogradilište Kraljevica
- Brodosplit Split
- Uljanik Pula

=== Denmark ===
- Aalborg Shipyard

=== Estonia ===
- Baltic Workboats Shipyard
- BLRT Grupp

=== Finland ===
- Helsinki
  - Helsinki Shipyard (operating at Hietalahti shipyard)
- Turku metropolitan area
  - Meyer Turku (operating at Perno shipyard)
  - Turku Repair Yard Ltd (headquarters in Naantali)
- Rauma
  - Rauma Marine Constructions (operating at Rauma shipyard)
- Uusikaupunki
  - Uki Workboat

=== France ===
- Bréhal: Iguana Yachts (2008-)
- Cherbourg: Constructions Mécaniques de Normandie (1945-)
- Les Herbiers: Jeanneau (1957–)
- Saint Nazaire
  - Chantiers de l'Atlantique (1955–)
- Shipbuilding groups:
  - Naval Group (1631-)

=== Germany ===
- Bremen
  - AG Weser (1872–1983)
  - Bremer Vulkan (1893–1997)
  - Deutsche Schiff- und Maschinenbau AG (1926–1945)
  - Lürssen (1875–)
- Bremerhaven: Schichau Seebeckwerft (1950–2009)
- Emden: Nordseewerke (1903–2010)
- Flensburg: Flensburger Schiffbau-Gesellschaft (FSG) (1872–)
- Hamburg
  - Blohm+Voss (1877–)
  - Pella Sietas (1635-2021)
  - Deutsche Werft (1918–1968)
  - H. C. Stülcken Sohn (1846–1966)
- Kiel
  - Deutsche Werke (1925–1945)
  - German Naval Yards Kiel
  - Germaniawerft (1867–1945)
  - Howaldtswerke-Deutsche Werft (HDW) (1838–2005)
  - Kaiserliche Werft Kiel (1867–1918)
  - TKMS (2005–)
- Kressbronn am Bodensee: Bodan-Werft (1919–2011)
- Lübeck: Flender Werke (1917–2002)
- Papenburg: Meyer Werft (1795-)
- Rendsburg: Nobiskrug (1905–)
- Rostock: Neptun Werft (1850–)
- Stralsund: Volkswerft (1945–)
- Wilhelmshaven
  - Kaiserliche Werft Wilhelmshaven (1871–1918)
  - Kriegsmarinewerft Wilhelmshaven (1918–1945)

=== Greece ===
- Basileiades
- Elefsis Shipyards
- Hellenic Shipyards Co. Skaramanga
- Neorion
- Chalkis Shipyards

=== Italy ===
- Azimut
- Baglietto La Spezia
- Benetti Viareggio
- FB Design Annone Brianza
- Ferretti Group
- Fincantieri
  - Stabilimento Tecnico Triestino
  - Cantiere navale di Ancona
  - Regio Cantiere di Castellammare di Stabia
  - Cantiere navale di Palermo
  - Cantiere navale di Riva Trigoso
  - Cantiere navale del Muggiano
- Perini Navi Viareggio
- Cantiere Navale Visentini Donada
- Rosetti Marino

=== Netherlands ===
- Royal IHC
- Barkmeijer Shipyards, Stroobos
- Damen Group
- Amels Holland B.V.
- Feadship
- Heesen Yachts
- Holland Jachtbouw Zaandam BV
- Royal Huisman
- ICON Yachts
- OceAnco
- Jongert

=== Norway ===
- Kleven Verft Ulsteinvik
- Moss Verft
- Ulstein Group Ulsteinvik
- Aker Solutions Various Locations.

=== Poland ===
- Elbląg: F. Schichau (1854–1945)
- Gdańsk
  - Danziger Werft (1921–1940)
  - F. Schichau (1890–1945)
  - Kaiserliche Werft Danzig (1871–1918)
  - Stocznia Gdańsk (1945–)
- Szczecin
  - AG Vulcan Stettin (1851–1945)
  - Stocznia Szczecińska Nowa (1945–)

=== Portugal ===
- West Sea Shipyard - Viana Do Castelo
- Lisnave - Estaleiros Navais SA Setúbal

=== Romania ===
- Damen Shipyards Galați (Galați)
- Mangalia shipyard (Mangalia)
- Constanţa Shipyard (Constanţa)

=== Russia ===
- Arkhangelsk: Krasnaya Kuznitsa (1693–1862, 1887–)
- Bolshoy Kamen: Zvezda shipyard (2015–)
- Kaliningrad: Yantar Shipyard (1945–)
- Komsomolsk-on-Amur: Amur Shipbuilding Plant (1932–)
- Nizhny Novgorod: Krasnoye Sormovo (1849–)
- Polyarny: Russian Shipyard Number 10 (1935–)
- Rybinsk: Vympel Shipyard (1930–)
- Saint Petersburg
  - Admiralty Shipyard (1704-)
  - Almaz (1901–)
  - Baltic Shipyard (1864–)
  - Kronstadt Marine Plant (1858–)
  - Petrozavod (1721-2001)
  - Severnaya Verf (Northern Shipyard) (1890–)
  - Sredne-Nevsky Shipyard (SNSZ) (1912–)
- Severodvinsk
  - Sevmash (1939–)
- Vladivostok
  - Dalzavod (1887–)
  - Vostochnaya Verf (1952–)
- Vyborg: Vyborg Shipyard (1948–)
- Zelenodolsk: Zelenodolsk Shipyard(1895–)

=== Spain ===
- Navantia

=== Sweden ===
- Dockstavarvet
- Eriksbergs Mekaniska Verkstad
- Götaverken
- Kockums Naval Solutions
- Lödöse varv
- Oskarshamn Shipyard

=== Turkey ===
- Ada Shipyard Tuzla, Istanbul
- Aegean Yachts Shipyard Bodrum, Muğla and Antalya
- Anadolu Shipyard Tuzla, Istanbul
- Ares Shipyard Antalya
- Argem Shipyard İstanbul
- Art Shipyard İstanbul
- ASTAS & SELTAS Shipyards İstanbul
- Beșiktaș Shipyard Altınova, Yalova
- Boğaziçi Shipyard Kadikoy, Istanbul and Yalova
- Cemre Shipyard Altınova, Yalova,
- Çeksan Shipyard Istanbul
- Gölcük Naval Shipyard, Gölcük, Kocaeli
- Imperial Arsenal, also known as Haliç Tersaneleri, is the world's oldest shipyard that is still in operation. Founded in 1455 2 years after the Conquest of Constantinople by Mehmet the Conqueror
- Inebolu Shipyard Kastamonu, İnebolu
- Istanbul Naval Shipyard Tuzla, Istanbul
- Sanmar Denizcilik Tuzla, Istanbul and Altinova, Yalova
- Sedef Shipyard Istanbul
- Sefine ShipyardAltınova, Yalova
- Su Marine Yachts Shipyard Tuzla, Istanbul
- Tersan Shipyard Yalova and Tuzla, Istanbul

=== Ukraine ===
- Kherson: Kherson Shipyard (1950s-)
- Kyiv: Kuznya na Rybalskomu (1928–)
- Mykolaiv
  - Black Sea Shipyard (1895–2021)
  - Mykolayiv Shipyard (1788-)
  - Okean Shipyard (1951–)

=== United Kingdom ===
==== England ====
- Cornwall
  - Falmouth: A&P Falmouth
- Cumbria
  - Barrow-in-Furness
    - Vickers Limited (1897–1927)
    - Vickers-Armstrongs (1927–1977)
    - Vickers Shipbuilding & Engineering (1977–2003)
    - BAE Systems Submarines (2003–present)
- Devon
  - Appledore: Appledore Shipbuilders (1855–Present)
  - Dartmouth: Philip and Son (1858–1999)
- Durham
  - Hartlepool: William Gray & Company (1863-1962)
  - Haverton Hill: Furness Shipbuilding Company (1917–1979)
  - Jarrow: Palmers Shipbuilding & Iron Company
- East Riding of Yorkshire
  - Hessle: Henry Scarr (1897–1932); Richard Dunston (1932-1994)
- Hampshire
  - Portsmouth Naval Base
    - Vosper & Company (1871–1966)
    - Vosper Thornycroft (1966–2008)
    - BAE Systems Maritime - Naval Ships (2008–present)
- Isle of Wight
  - East Cowes
    - J Samuel White (1700s–1963)
    - Wight Shipyard
- Kent
  - Northfleet Shipyard (1788–1816)
- London
  - Chiswick: Thornycroft (1866–1908)
  - Leamouth: Thames Ironworks & Shipbuilding Company (1837–1912)
  - Rotherhithe: The Pageants (1700s)
  - London and Glasgow Shipbuilding Company (1864–1912)
- Merseyside
  - Birkenhead: Cammell Laird (1828–present)
- North Yorkshire
  - Middlesbrough
    - A&P Tees
    - Parkol Marine Engineering (1997–present)
    - Smiths Dock Company (1907–1987)
  - Whitby
    - Parkol Marine Engineering
- South Yorkshire
  - Thorne: Richard Dunston (1858–1985)
- Southampton
  - Woolston: John I. Thornycroft & Company (1908–1966)
- Tyne and Wear
  - Hebburn
    - A&P Tyne
    - A. Leslie and Company (1853–1886)
    - Hawthorn Leslie and Company (1886–1982)
  - High Walker Yard: Sir W. G. Armstrong Whitworth & Company (defunct 1927)
  - North Shields: Smiths Dock Company (1810–1909)
  - Pallion
    - William Doxford & Sons (1870–1989)
    - Short Brothers of Sunderland (1850–1964)
  - South Shields: John Readhead & Sons (1865–1984)
  - Southwick: Austin & Pickersgill (1838–1988)
  - Sunderland
    - Bartram & Sons (1838–1978)
    - John Crown & Sons (1847-1947)
  - Wallsend
    - Swan Hunter (1880-2006)
    - Willington Quay: Clelands Shipbuilding Company (1866-1984)

==== Northern Ireland ====
- Belfast: Harland and Wolff

==== Scotland ====
- Clyde:
  - Clydebank: John Brown & Company (1851–1972)
  - Dumbarton: Denny (1811–1963)
  - Govan
    - BAE Systems Maritime - Naval Ships
    - William Beardmore and Company (1900–1930)
    - Fairfields (1834–1968)
    - Robert Napier and Sons (1826–1900)
  - Greenock
    - Scotts Shipbuilding and Engineering Company (1711-1993)
    - Robert Steele & Company (1796-1883)
    - Caird & Company (1828-1922)
    - James Lamont & Co (1870-19??)
    - Greenock Dockyard Company(1900-1966)
    - George Brown & Co (1901-1983)
  - Leith: Ramage & Ferguson (1877–1934)
  - Linthouse: Alexander Stephens & Sons (1870–1968)
  - Port Glasgow
    - Robert Duncan and Company(1830-1915)
    - Lithgows(1874-1993)
    - Ferguson Marine Engineering (1903–present)
    - William Hamilton and Company (1800s–1900s)
  - Scotstoun
    - BAE Systems Maritime - Naval Ships
    - Barclay Curle
    - Charles Connell and Company (1861–1980)
    - Yarrow Shipbuilders (1865–1999)
  - Upper Clyde Shipbuilders (1968–1972)
  - Whiteinch: Barclay Curle

== North America ==
=== Canada ===
- ABCO Industries
- A. F. Theriault Shipyard
- Allied Shipbuilders
- Davie Shipbuilding
  - MIL-Davie Shipbuilding (predecessor, 1986–2006)
    - Marine Industries (predecessor, 1936–1986)
- Irving Shipbuilding
  - Halifax Shipyard (largest facility and HQ)
- Kiewit Corporation
- NewDock-St. John's Dockyard Company
  - CN Marine (predecessor, 1977–1986)
- Port Weller Dry Docks
- Seaspan ULC
- Toronto Drydock Company

=== Mexico ===
- SEMAR (Veracruz Federal Shipbuilding)
- Carso Marina
- Pemex Construcción
- Veracruz Kukulkan Shipyards
- Zihuatanejo Marina
- Acapulco shipyards (Acapulco Naval Shipbuilding)

=== United States ===
- Alameda Works Shipyard, Alameda, California (1916–1956)
- Albina Engine & Machine Works, Portland, Oregon
- American Shipbuilding, Cleveland, Ohio, Lorain, Ohio (1888–1995)
- Atlantic Basin Iron Works, Brooklyn, New York
- Austal USA, Mobile, Alabama
- Avondale Shipyard, Westwego, Louisiana
- BAE Systems Ship Repair, Norfolk, Virginia
- Bath Iron Works, Bath, Maine
- Bay Shipbuilding Company, Sturgeon Bay, Wisconsin
- Bethlehem Shipbuilding Corporation, Limited (BethShip) (1913–1964)
- Bethlehem Sparrows Point Shipyard, Sparrows Point, Maryland (1914–1997)
- Boston Navy Yard, Charlestown, Massachusetts
- Bollinger Shipyards, Lockport, Louisiana
- Brooklyn Navy Yard, Brooklyn, New York
- Brown Shipbuilding, Houston, Texas (1942–1985)
- Brown & Bell Shipyard, New York City (1824–1855)
- Burger Boat Company, Manitowoc, Wisconsin
- California Shipbuilding Corporation, Terminal Island, Los Angeles County, California
- Charleston Naval Shipyard, Charleston, South Carolina
- Chesapeake Shipbuilding, Salisbury, Maryland
- Chester Shipbuilding, Chester, Pennsylvania
- Commercial Iron Works, Portland, Oregon
- Consolidated Steel Orange Shipyard, Orange, Texas
- Defoe Shipbuilding Company, Bay City, Michigan (1905–1975)
- Delaware River Iron Ship Building and Engine Works, Chester, Pennsylvania
- Derecktor Shipyards, Mamaroneck, New York
- Dravo Corporation, Pittsburgh, Pennsylvania
- Eastern Shipbuilding Group, Panama City, FL
- Edward F. Williams, Greenpoint, Brooklyn
- Edward Knight Collins and the Collins Line, New York City (1818–1858)
- Electric Boat Corporation, Groton, Connecticut, Quonset Point, Rhode Island
- Everett Ship Repair, Everett, Washington
- Federal Shipbuilding & Drydock, Newark, New Jersey (1917–1949)
- Fore River Shipyard, Quincy, Massachusetts (1901–1964)
- Gas Engine & Power Company & Charles L. Seabury Company, Morris Heights, Bronx, New York
- General Dynamics, Quincy, Massachusetts
- General Engineering & Dry Dock Company, Alameda, California
- George Lawley & Sons, Neponset, Massachusetts
- Gladding-Hearn Shipbuilding, Somerset, Massachusetts
- Gulf Shipbuilding, Chickasaw, Alabama
- George Steers and Co, Greenpoint, Brooklyn
- Henry B. Nevins, Incorporated, City Island, New York
- Higgins, New Orleans, Louisiana
- Ingalls Shipbuilding, Pascagoula, Mississippi
- Isaac C. Smith, Hoboken, New Jersey
- Jakobson Shipyard, Oyster Bay, Long Island, New York
- James O. Curtis, Medford, Massachusetts
- Jeffersonville Boat & Machine, Jeffersonville, Indiana
- John H. Mathis & Company, Camden, New Jersey
- John Roach & Sons, Chester, Pennsylvania and New York City
- John Trumpy & Sons, Annapolis, Maryland
- Kaiser Shipyards
- Lake Washington Shipyard, Houghton, Washington
- Lawrence & Foulks, New York
- Lockheed Shipbuilding and Construction Company, Seattle, Washington formerly Puget Sound Bridge and Dredging Company
- Long Beach Naval Shipyard, Long Beach, California
- Los Angeles Shipbuilding and Drydock, Los Angeles, California
- Mare Island Naval Shipyard, Vallejo, California
- Marinette Marine, Marinette, Wisconsin
- Marinship – Bechtel Shipyards, Sausalito, California
- Maryland Drydock, Baltimore, Maryland
- Merchant Shipbuilding Corporation, Chester, Pennsylvania
- Moore Dry Dock Company, Oakland, California
- Morse Dry Dock & Repair Company, Brooklyn, New York
- National Steel and Shipbuilding Company, San Diego, California
- Neafie & Levy, Philadelphia, Pennsylvania
- New England Shipbuilding Corporation, South Portland, Maine
- Newport News Shipbuilding & Drydock, Newport News, Virginia
- New York Shipbuilding Corporation (New York Ship), Camden, New Jersey (1899–1967)
- Norfolk Naval Shipyard, Portsmouth, Virginia
- North Florida Shipyards, Inc., Jacksonville, Florida
- Oregon Shipbuilding Corporation, Portland, Oregon, part of the Kaiser Shipyards
- Pearl Harbor Naval Shipyard, Pearl Harbor, Hawaii
- Pennellville Historic District
- Percy & Small Shipyard, Bath, Maine
- Philadelphia Naval Shipyard, Philadelphia, Pennsylvania
- Philly Shipyard, Philadelphia, Pennsylvania
- Portsmouth Naval Shipyard, Kittery, Maine
- Puget Sound Naval Shipyard, Bremerton, Washington
- Pusey and Jones, Wilmington, Delaware
- Reaney, Son & Archbold, Chester, Pennsylvania
- Richmond Shipyards, Richmond, California, part of the Kaiser Shipyards
- SAFE Boats International LLC, Bremerton, Washington
- Seattle-Tacoma Shipbuilding, Seattle, Washington
- Swiftships, Morgan City, Louisiana
- Sun Shipbuilding and Drydock Company, Chester, Pennsylvania
- T. J. Southard (Richmond, Maine)
- Tampa Shipbuilding, Tampa, Florida
- Todd Shipyards
- United States Coast Guard Yard, Curtis Bay, Baltimore, Maryland
- Union Iron Works, San Francisco, California (1905–1941)
- Vigor Marine Group, Washington, Oregon, California, and Virginia
- VT Halter Marine, Pascagoula, Mississippi
- Western Pipe & Steel, San Francisco, California
- William Cramp & Sons Shipbuilding Company, Philadelphia, Pennsylvania
- William H. Webb shipyard, New York City
- Westervelt & Co. shipyard, New York City
- Winslow Marine Railway & Shipbuilding, Winslow, Washington, Seattle, Washington
- Zidell Marine, Portland, Oregon

== Oceania ==
=== Australia ===
- Austal (Henderson, Western Australia)
- ASC, (Osborne, South Australia and Henderson, Western Australia)
- Australian Marine Complex (Henderson, Western Australia)
- BAE Systems Maritime Australia (Henderson, Western Australia and Williamstown, Victoria)
- BSC Marine Group, (Toowong, Queensland)
- Cairncross Dockyard, (Morningside, Queensland)
- Civmec, (Henderson, Western Australia)
- de Havilland Marine, (Bankstown, New South Wales)
- Forgacs Marine & Defence (Tomago, New South Wales)
- Incat (Hobart, Tasmania)
- Lars Halvorsen Sons, (Sydney, New South Wales)
- Norman R Wright & Sons, (Bulimba, Queensland)
- NQEA (Cairns, Queensland)
- Osborne Naval Shipyard, (Osborne, South Australia)
- Richardson Devine Marine (Hobart, Tasmania)
- Walsh Island Dockyard & Engineering Works, (Newcastle, New South Wales)
- Williamstown Dockyard. (Williamstown, Victoria)

== South America ==
=== Argentina ===
- Astillero "Río Santiago" (AFNE) (Ensenada, Buenos Aires)
- Astilleros Argentinos S.A. (ASTARSA)
- Puerto Belgrano Naval Base shipyard
- Tandanor

=== Brazil ===
- INACE
- EMGEPRON

=== Chile ===
- Asenav Valdivia
- ASMAR Talcahuano, Valparaíso, Punta Arenas

=== Colombia ===
- COTECMAR

=== Peru ===
- SIMA

== See also ==
- List of the largest shipbuilding companies
