= Shipbuilding =

Construction of ships and floating vessels

Shipbuilding is the construction of ships and other floating vessels. In modern times, it normally takes place in a specialized facility known as a shipyard. Shipbuilders, also called shipwrights, follow a specialized occupation that traces its roots to before recorded history.

Until recently, with the development of complex non-maritime technologies during the industrial revolution, a ship has often represented the most advanced structure that the society building it could produce. Some key industrial advances were developed to support shipbuilding, for instance the sawing of timbers by mechanical saws propelled by windmills in Dutch shipyards during the first half of the 17th century. (Note: Wind-powered sawmills gave a huge productivity advantage over hand-sawn timber. 60 beams could be sawn in 4 to 5 days by the wind-powered saw, whilst hand-sawing the same quantity would take about 120 days.) The design process saw the early adoption of the logarithm (invented in 1615) to generate the curves used to produce the shape of a hull, especially when scaling up these curves accurately in the mould loft.

Shipbuilding and ship repairs, both commercial and military, are referred to as naval engineering. The construction of boats is a similar activity called boat building.

The dismantling of ships is called ship breaking.

The earliest evidence of maritime transport by modern humans is the settlement of Australia between 50,000 and 60,000 years ago. This almost certainly involved rafts, possibly equipped with some sort of sail. Much of the development beyond that raft technology occurred in the "nursery" areas of the Mediterranean and in Maritime Southeast Asia. Favoured by warmer waters and a number of inter-visible islands, boats (and, later, ships) with water-tight hulls (unlike the "flow through" structure of a raft) could be developed. The ships of ancient Egypt were built by joining the hull planks together, edge to edge, with tenons set in mortices cut in the mating edges. A similar technique, but with the tenons being pinned in position by dowels, was used in the Mediterranean for most of classical antiquity. Both these variants are "shell first" techniques, where any reinforcing frames are inserted after assembly of the planking has defined the hull shape. Carvel construction then took over in the Mediterranean. Northern Europe used clinker construction, but with some flush-planked ship-building in, for instance, the bottom planking of cogs. The north-European and Mediterranean traditions merged in the late 15th century, with carvel construction being adopted in the North and the centre-line mounted rudder replacing the quarter rudder of the Mediterranean. These changes broadly coincided with improvements in sailing rigs, with the three masted ship becoming common, with square sails on the fore and main masts, and a fore and aft sail on the mizzen.

Ship-building then saw a steady improvement in design techniques and introduction of new materials. Iron was used for more than fastenings (nails and bolts) as structural components such as iron knees were introduced, with examples existing in the mid-18th century and from the mid-19th century onwards. This was partly led by the shortage of "compass timber", the naturally curved timber that meant that shapes could be cut without weaknesses caused by cuts across the grain of the timber. Ultimately, whole ships were made of iron and, later, steel.

== History ==
=== Pre-history ===
The earliest known depictions (including paintings and models) of shallow-water sailing boats is from the 6th to 5th millennium BC of the Ubaid period of Mesopotamia. They were made from bundled reeds coated in bitumen and had bipod masts. They sailed in shallow coastal waters of the Persian Gulf.

=== 4th millennium BC ===
==== Ancient Egypt ====
Evidence from Ancient Egypt shows that the early Egyptians knew how to assemble planks of wood into a ship hull as early as 3100 BC. Egyptian pottery as old as 4000 BC shows designs of early fluvial boats or other means for navigation. The Archaeological Institute of America reports that some of the oldest ships yet unearthed are known as the Abydos boats. These are a group of 14 ships discovered in Abydos that were constructed of wooden planks which were "sewn" together. Discovered by Egyptologist David O'Connor of New York University, woven straps were found to have been used to lash the planks together, and reeds or grass stuffed between the planks helped to seal the seams. Because the ships are all buried together and near a mortuary belonging to Pharaoh Khasekhemwy, originally they were all thought to have belonged to him, but one of the 14 ships dates to 3000 BC, and the associated pottery jars buried with the vessels also suggest earlier dating. The ship dating to 3000 BC was about 75 feet (23 m) long and is now thought to perhaps have belonged to an earlier pharaoh. According to professor O'Connor, the 5,000-year-old ship may have even belonged to Pharaoh Aha.

==== Austronesia ====
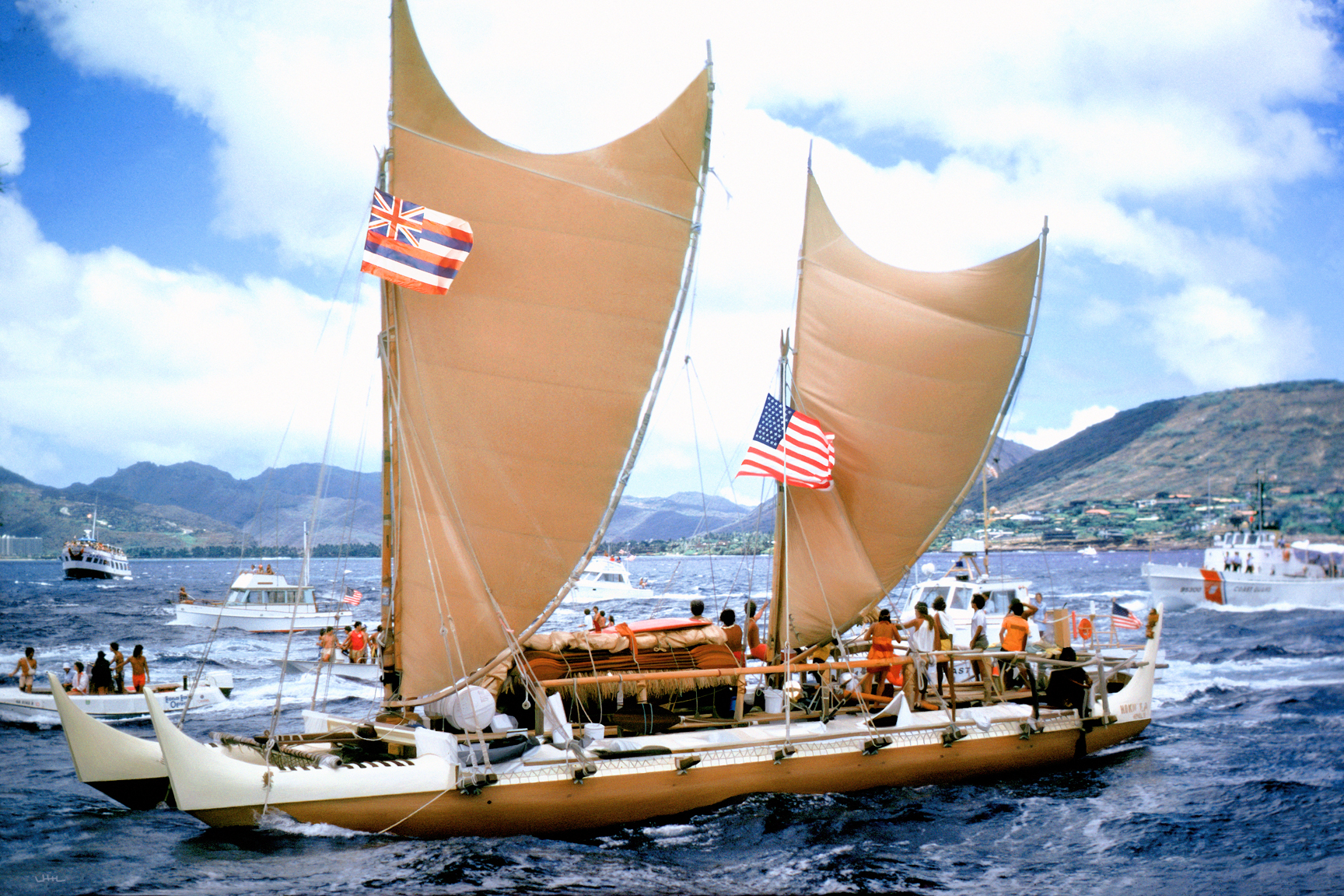
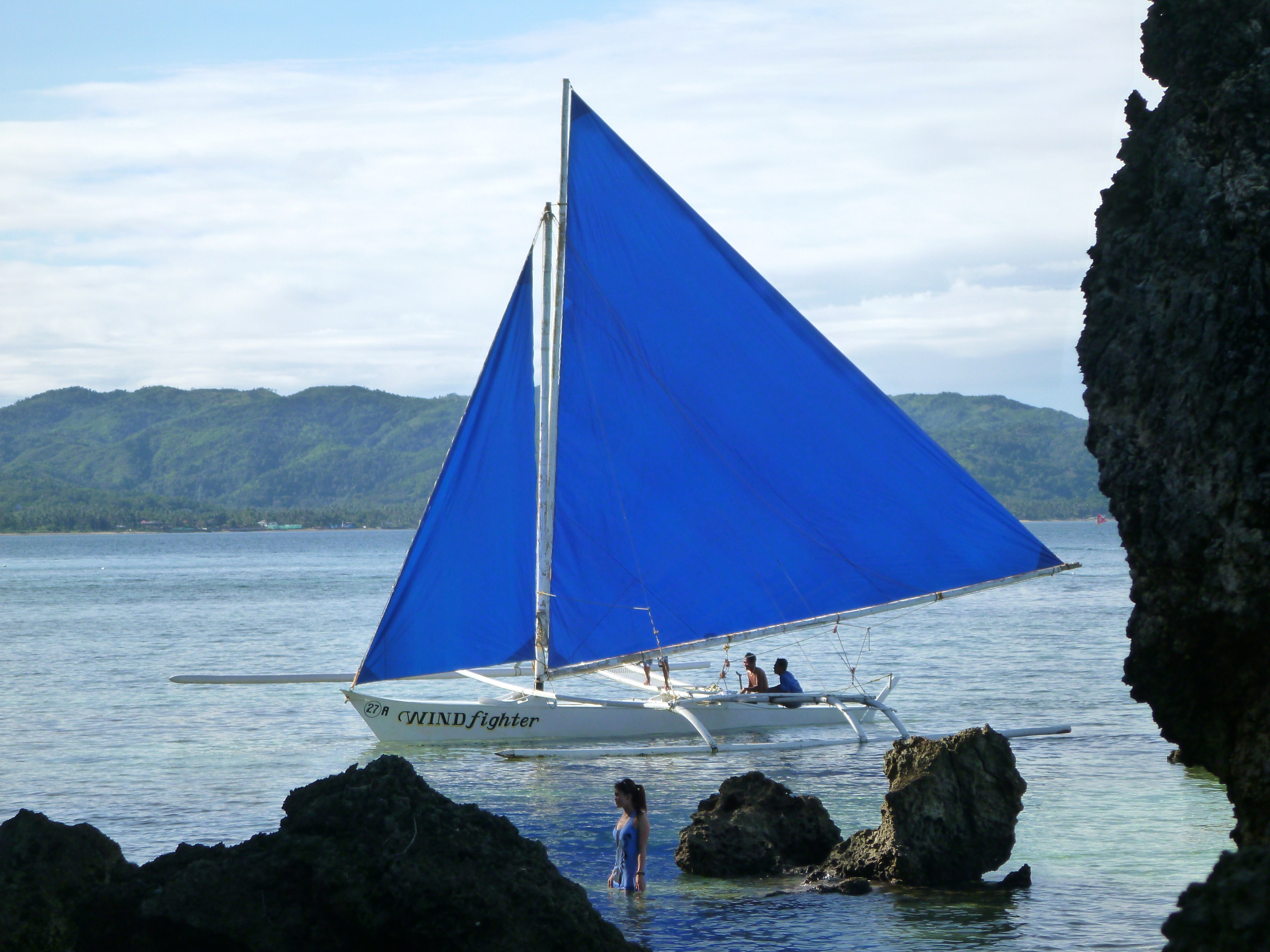
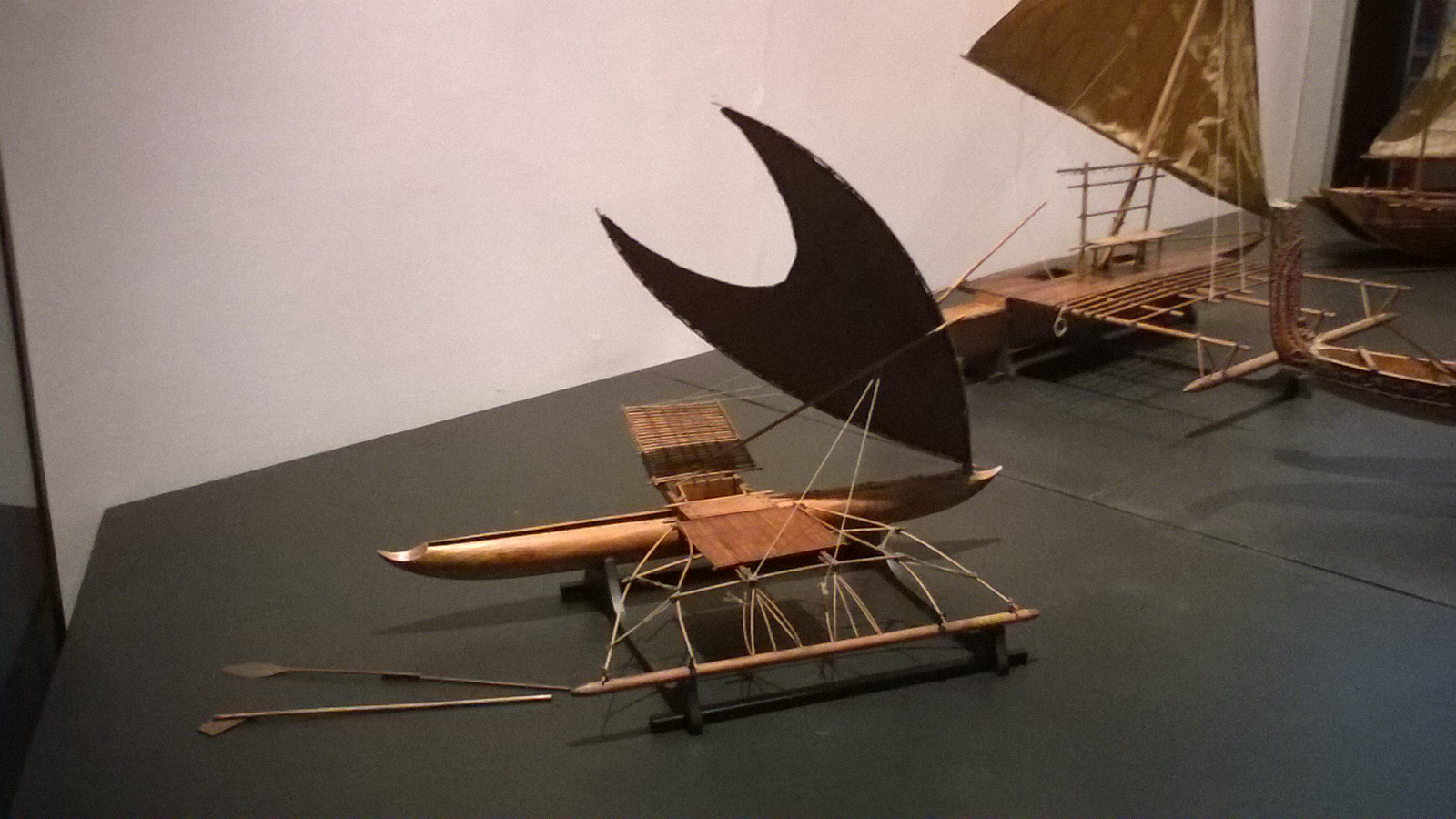
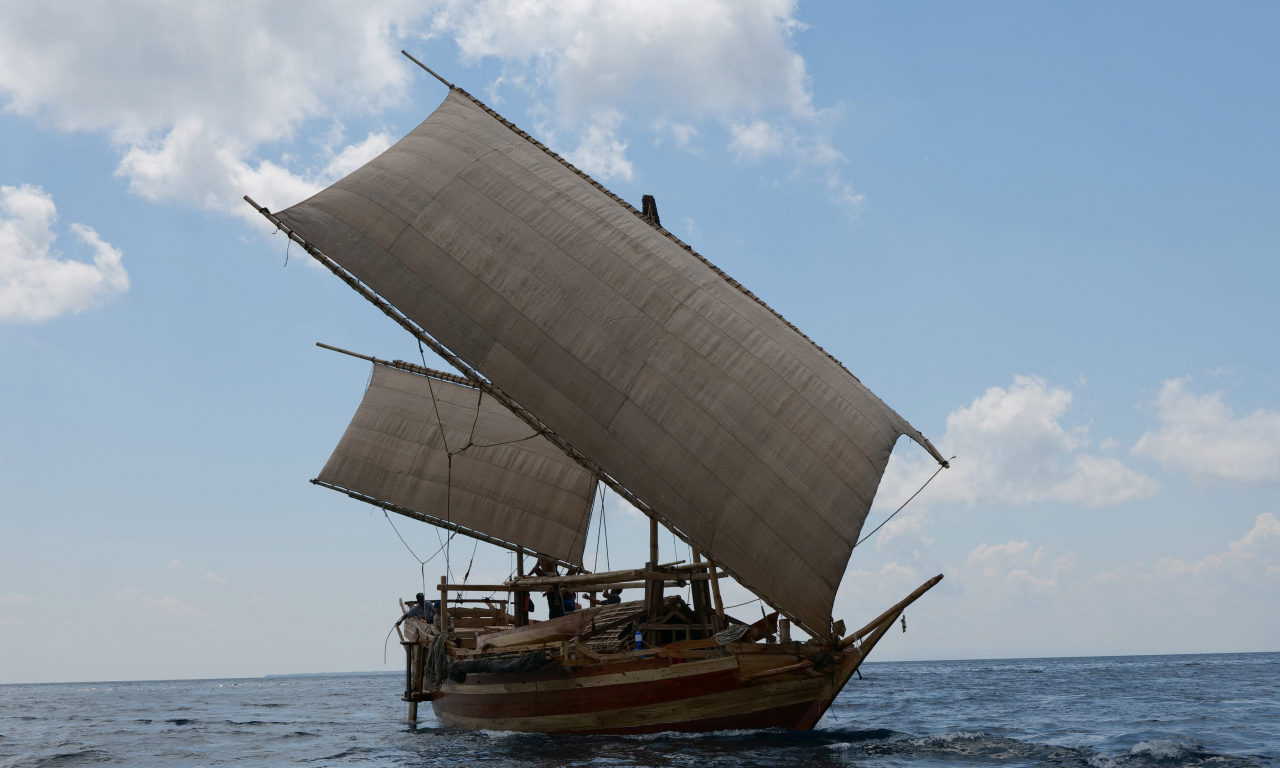
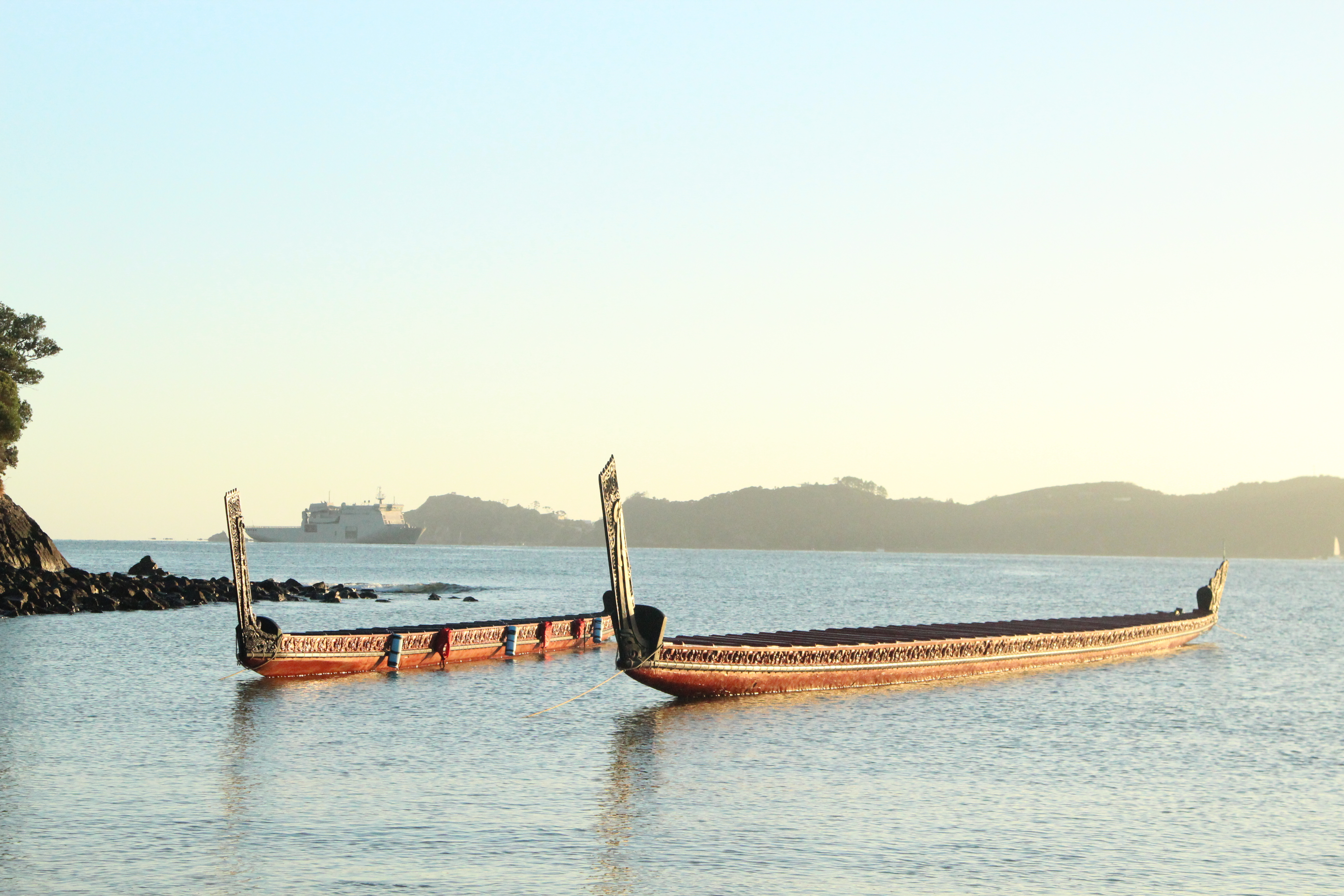
Typical Austronesian ship designs, left to right:
- Hōkūleʻa, a replica Polynesian voyaging catamaran with crab claw sails
- Filipino double-outrigger (trimaran) paraw with a crab claw sail
- A Melanesian single-outrigger tepukei with a forward-mounted crab claw sail from the Solomon Islands
- Nur al Marege, an Indonesian replica of a padewakang with tanja sails
- Waka, narrow Māori war canoes propelled by paddling

The Austronesian expansion, which began c. 3000 BC with migration from Taiwan to the island of Luzon in the Philippines, spread across Island Southeast Asia. Then, between 1500 BC and 1500 AD they settled uninhabited islands of the Pacific, and also sailed westward to Madagascar. This is associated with distinctive maritime technology: lashed lug construction techniques (both in outrigger canoes and in large planked sailing vessels), various types of outrigger and twin-hulled canoes and a range of sailing rigs that included the crab claw sail. The origins of this technology is difficult to date, relying largely on linguistics (studying the words for parts of boats), the written comments of people from other cultures, including the observations of European explorers at the time of first contact and the later more systematic ethnographic observations of the types of craft in use. There is only a small body of archaeological evidence available. Since Island Southeast Asia contained effective maritime transport between its very large number of islands long before Austronesian seafaring, it is argued that Austronesians adopted an existing maritime technology from the existing inhabitants of this region.

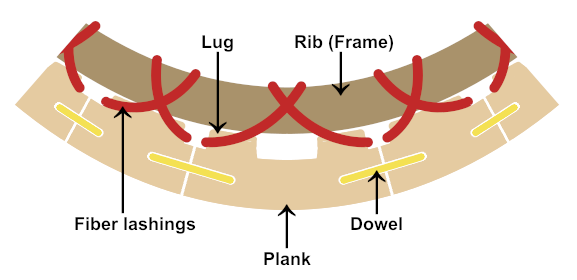
Generalized diagram (cross-section) of lashed-lug planking in Butuan Boat Two (Clark et al., 1993)

Austronesian ships varied from simple canoes to large multihull ships. The simplest form of all ancestral Austronesian boats had five parts. The bottom part consists of a single piece of hollowed-out log. At the sides were two planks, and two horseshoe-shaped wood pieces formed the prow and stern. These were fitted tightly together edge-to-edge with dowels inserted into holes in between, and then lashed to each other with ropes (made from rattan or fiber) wrapped around protruding lugs on the planks. This characteristic and ancient Austronesian boatbuilding practice is known as the "lashed-lug" technique. They were commonly caulked with pastes made from various plants as well as tapa bark and fibres which would expand when wet, further tightening joints and making the hull watertight. They formed the shell of the boat, which was then reinforced by horizontal ribs. Shipwrecks of Austronesian ships can be identified from this construction as well as the absence of metal nails. Austronesian ships traditionally had no central rudders but were instead steered using an oar on one side.

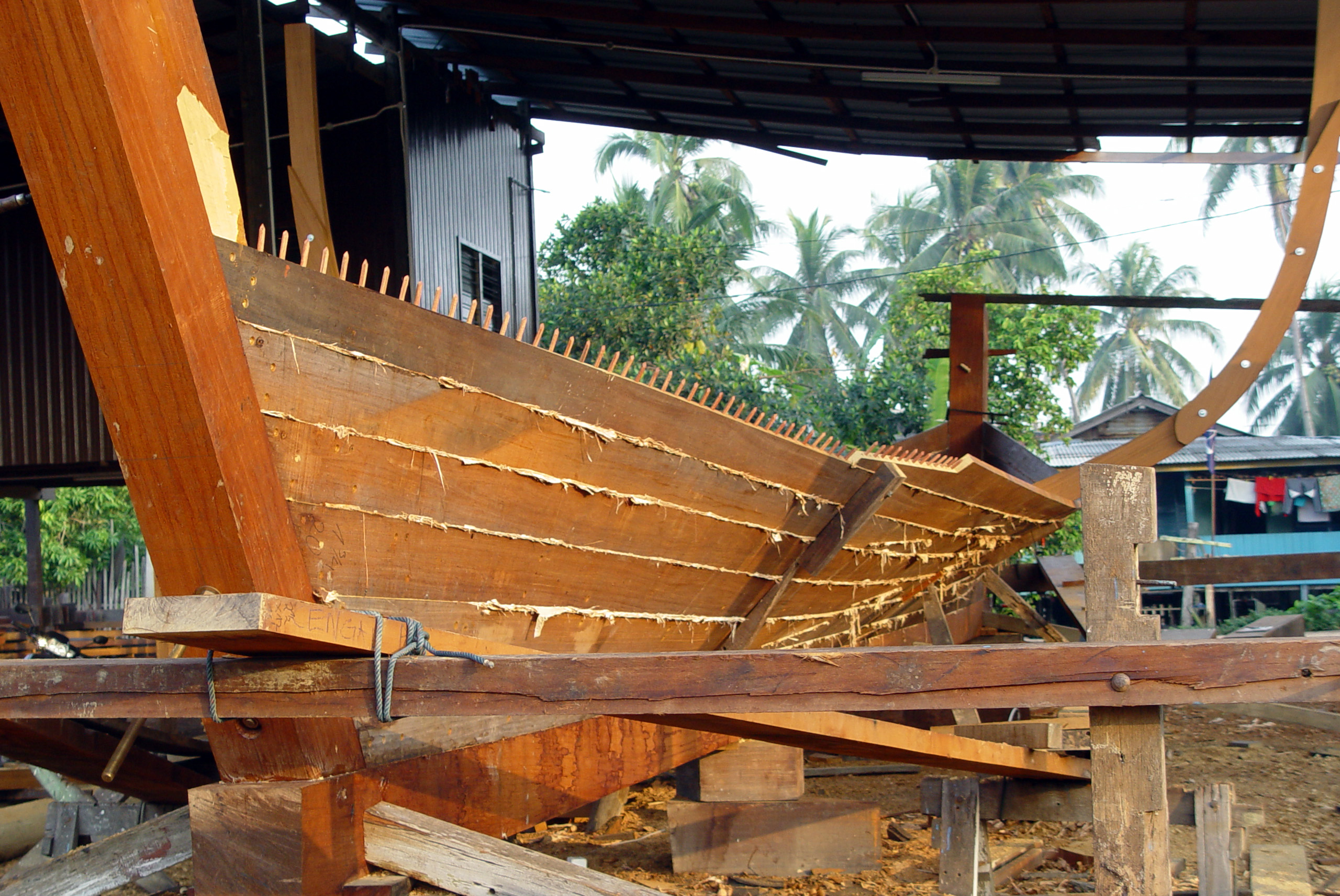
Construction of the Naga Pelangi in 2004, a Malaysian pinas, using traditional Austronesian edge-dowelled techniques. Note the protruding dowels on the upper edges of the planks and the fiber caulking in the seams.

Austronesians traditionally made their sails from woven mats of the resilient and salt-resistant pandanus leaves. These sails allowed Austronesians to embark on long-distance voyaging.

The ancient Champa of Vietnam also uniquely developed basket-hulled boats whose hulls were composed of woven and resin-caulked bamboo, either entirely or in conjunction with plank strakes. They range from small coracles (the o thúng) to large ocean-going trading ships like the ghe mành.

=== 3rd millennium BC ===
==== Ancient Egypt ====
Early Egyptians also knew how to assemble planks of wood with treenails to fasten them together, using pitch for caulking the seams. The "Khufu ship", a 43.6-meter vessel sealed into a pit in the Giza pyramid complex at the foot of the Great Pyramid of Giza in the Fourth Dynasty around 2500 BC, is a full-size surviving example which may have fulfilled the symbolic function of a solar barque. Early Egyptians also knew how to fasten the planks of this ship together with mortise and tenon joints.

==== Ancient India ====
The oldest known tidal dock in the world was built around 2500 BC during the Harappan civilisation at Lothal near the present day Mangrol harbour on the Gujarat coast in India. Other ports were probably at Kot Bala and Dwarka. However, it is probable that many small-scale ports, and not massive ports, were used for the Harappan maritime trade. Ships from the harbour at these ancient port cities established trade with Mesopotamia. Shipbuilding and boatmaking may have been prosperous industries in ancient India. Native labourers may have manufactured the flotilla of boats used by Alexander the Great to navigate across the Hydaspes and even the Indus, under Nearchos. The Indians also exported teak for shipbuilding to ancient Persia. Other references to Indian timber used for shipbuilding is noted in the works of Ibn Jubayr.

=== 2nd millennium BC ===
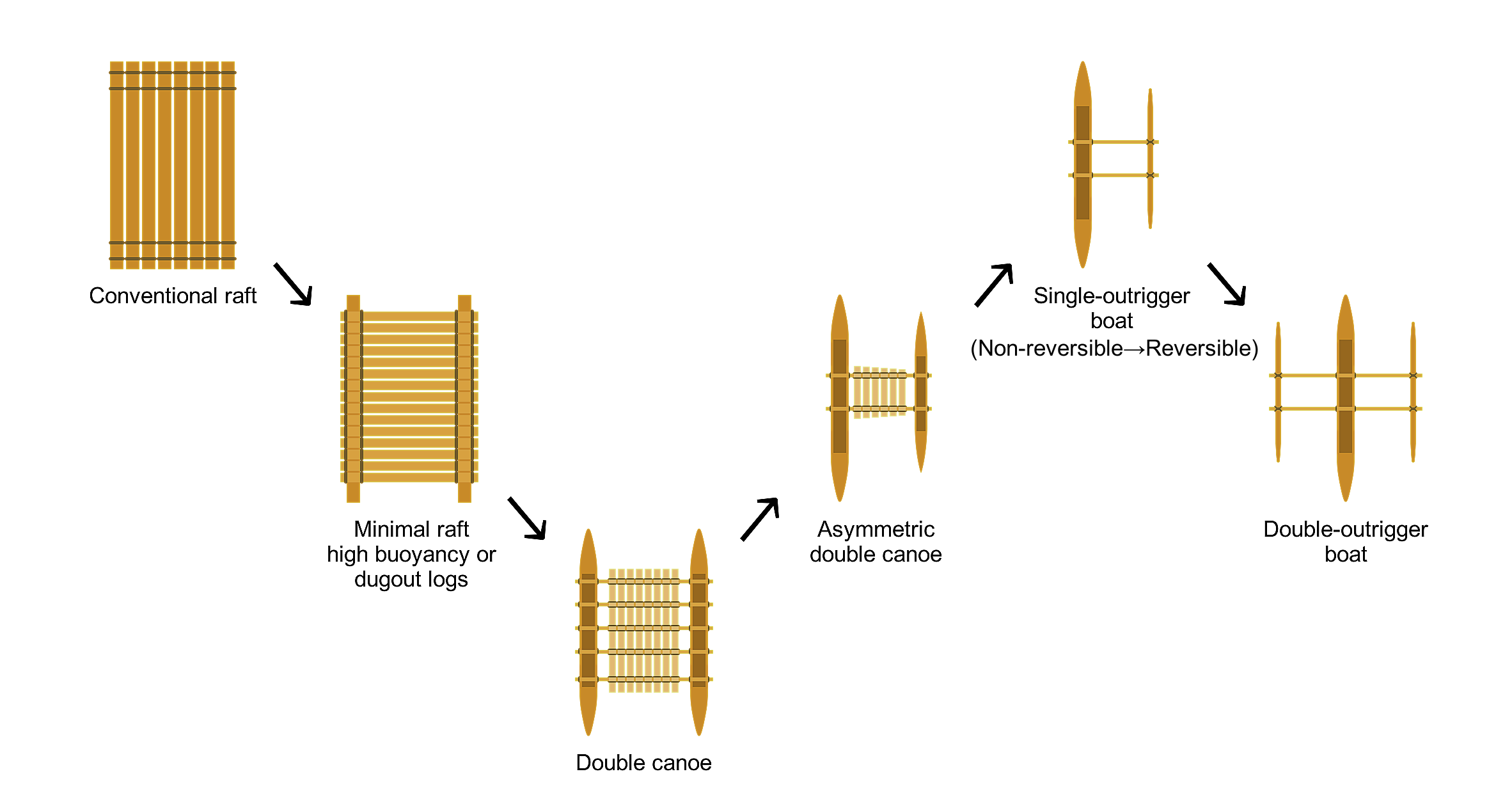
Succession of forms in the development of the Austronesian boat

==== Mediterranean ====
The ships of Ancient Egypt's Eighteenth Dynasty were typically about 25 meters (80 ft) in length and had a single mast, sometimes consisting of two poles lashed together at the top making an "A" shape. They mounted a single square sail on a yard, with an additional spar along the bottom of the sail. These ships could also be oar propelled. The ocean- and sea-going ships of Ancient Egypt were constructed with cedar wood, most likely hailing from Lebanon.

The ships of Phoenicia seem to have been of a similar design.

=== 1st millennium BC ===
==== Austronesia ====
Austronesians established the Austronesian maritime trade network at around 1000 to 600 BC, linking Southeast Asia with East Asia, South Asia, the Middle East, and later East Africa. The route later became part of the Spice trade network and the Maritime Silk Road.

==== China ====
The naval history of China stems back to the Spring and Autumn period (722–481 BC) of the ancient Chinese Zhou dynasty. The Chinese built large rectangular barges known as "castle ships", which were essentially floating fortresses complete with multiple decks with guarded ramparts. However, the Chinese vessels during this era were essentially fluvial (riverine). True ocean-going Chinese fleets did not appear until the 10th century Song dynasty.

==== Mediterranean ====
There is considerable knowledge regarding shipbuilding and seafaring in the ancient Mediterranean.

=== 1st millennium AD ===
==== Austronesia ====
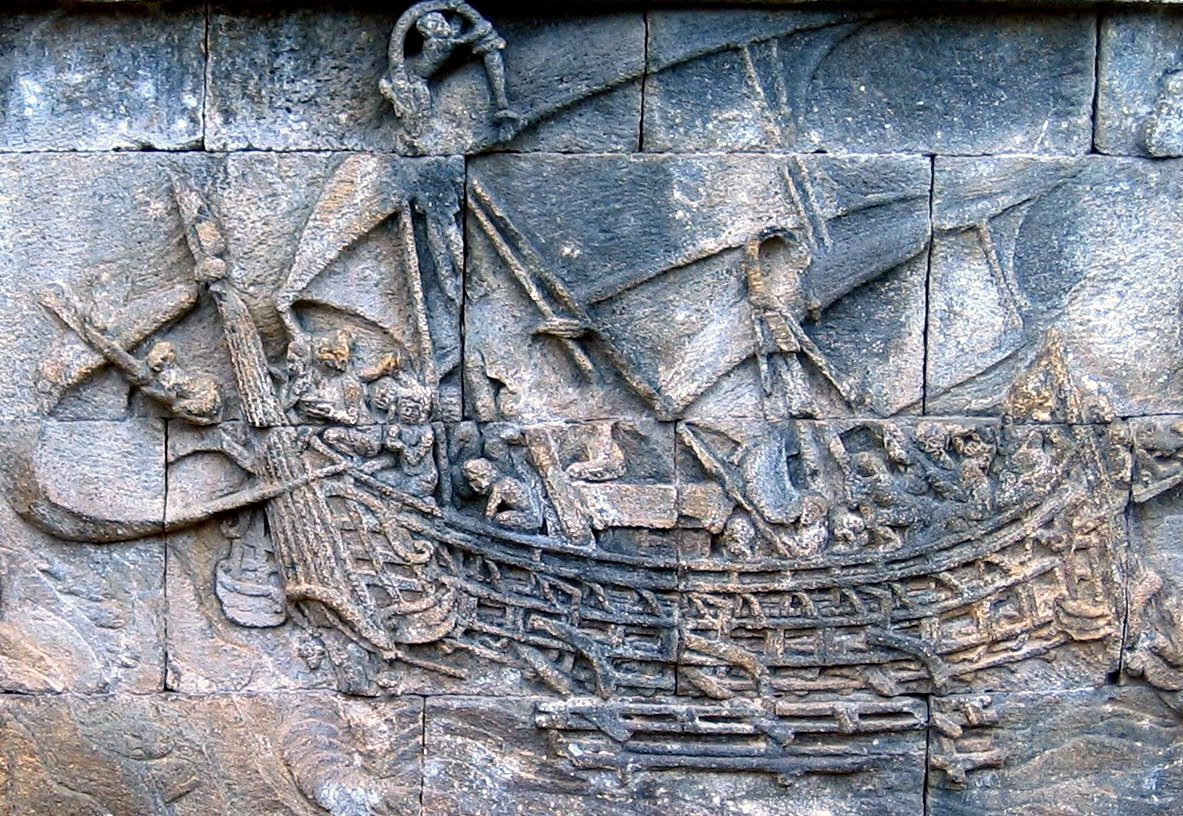
One of the Javanese Borobudur ships (c. 778–850 AD), depicting a typical Austronesian ship with tanja sails and double outriggers

Large multi-masted seafaring ships of Southeast Asian Austronesians first started appearing in Chinese records during the Han dynasty as the k'un-lun po or kunlun bo ("ship of the k'un-lun [dark-skinned southern people]"). These ships used two types of sail of their invention, the junk sail and tanja sail. Large ships are about 50–60 metres (164–197 ft) long, had 5.2–7.8 metres (17–26 ft) tall freeboard, each carrying provisions enough for a year, and could carry 200–1000 people. The Chinese recorded that these Southeast Asian ships were hired for passage to South Asia by Chinese Buddhist pilgrims and travelers, because they did not build seaworthy ships of their own until around the 8–9th century AD.

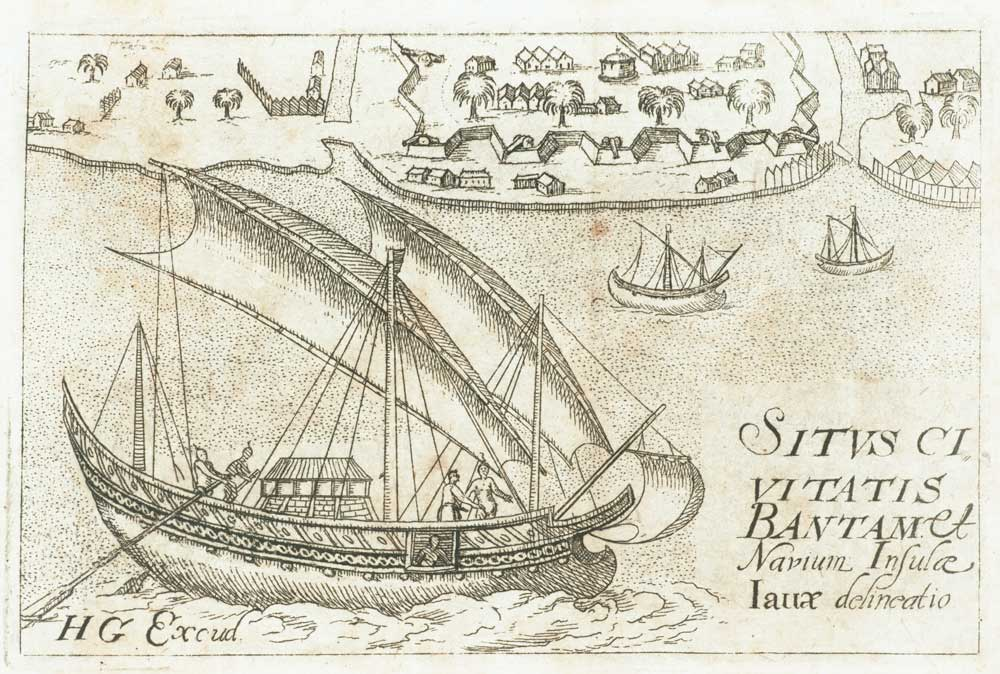
Illustration of a djong, large Javanese trading vessel, extant until 17th century AD. Shown with the characteristic tanja sail of Southeast Asian Austronesians. Vessels like these became the basis of Southern Chinese junks.

Austronesians (especially from western Island Southeast Asia) were trading in the Indian Ocean as far as Africa during this period. By around 50 to 500 AD, a group of Austronesians, believed to be from the southeastern coasts of Borneo (possibly a mixed group related to the modern Ma'anyan, Banjar, and/or the Dayak people) crossed the Indian Ocean and colonized Madagascar. This resulted in the introduction of outrigger canoe technology to non-Austronesian cultures in the East African coast.

==== China ====
The ancient Chinese also built fluvial ramming vessels as in the Greco-Roman tradition of the trireme, although oar-steered ships lost favor very early on: the stern-mounted rudder was first developed in 1st-century China under the Han dynasty, along with the junk ship style. The Chinese were using square sails during the Han dynasty and adopted the Austronesian junk sail later in the 12th century. Iconographic remains show that Chinese ships before the 12th century used square sails, and the junk rig of Chinese ships is believed to be developed from tilted sails.

Southern Chinese junks were based on keeled and multi-planked Austronesian ship known as po by the Chinese, from the Old Javanese parahu, Javanese prau, or Malay perahu – large ship. Southern Chinese junks showed characteristics of Austronesian ships that they are made using timbers of tropical origin, with keeled, V-shaped hull. This is different from northern Chinese junks, which are developed from flat-bottomed riverine boats. The northern Chinese junks were primarily built of pine or fir wood, had flat bottoms with no keel, water-tight bulkheads with no frames, transom (squared) stern and stem, and have their planks fastened with iron nails or clamps.

It was unknown when the Chinese people started adopting Southeast Asian (Austronesian) shipbuilding techniques. They may have been started as early as the 8th century, but the development was gradual and the true ocean-going Chinese junks did not appear suddenly. The word "po" survived in Chinese long after, referring to the large ocean-going junks.

==== Mediterranean ====
In September 2011, archeological investigations done at the site of Portus in Rome revealed inscriptions in a shipyard constructed during the reign of Trajan (98–117) that indicated the existence of a shipbuilders guild.

=== Early 2nd millennium AD ===
==== Austronesia ====
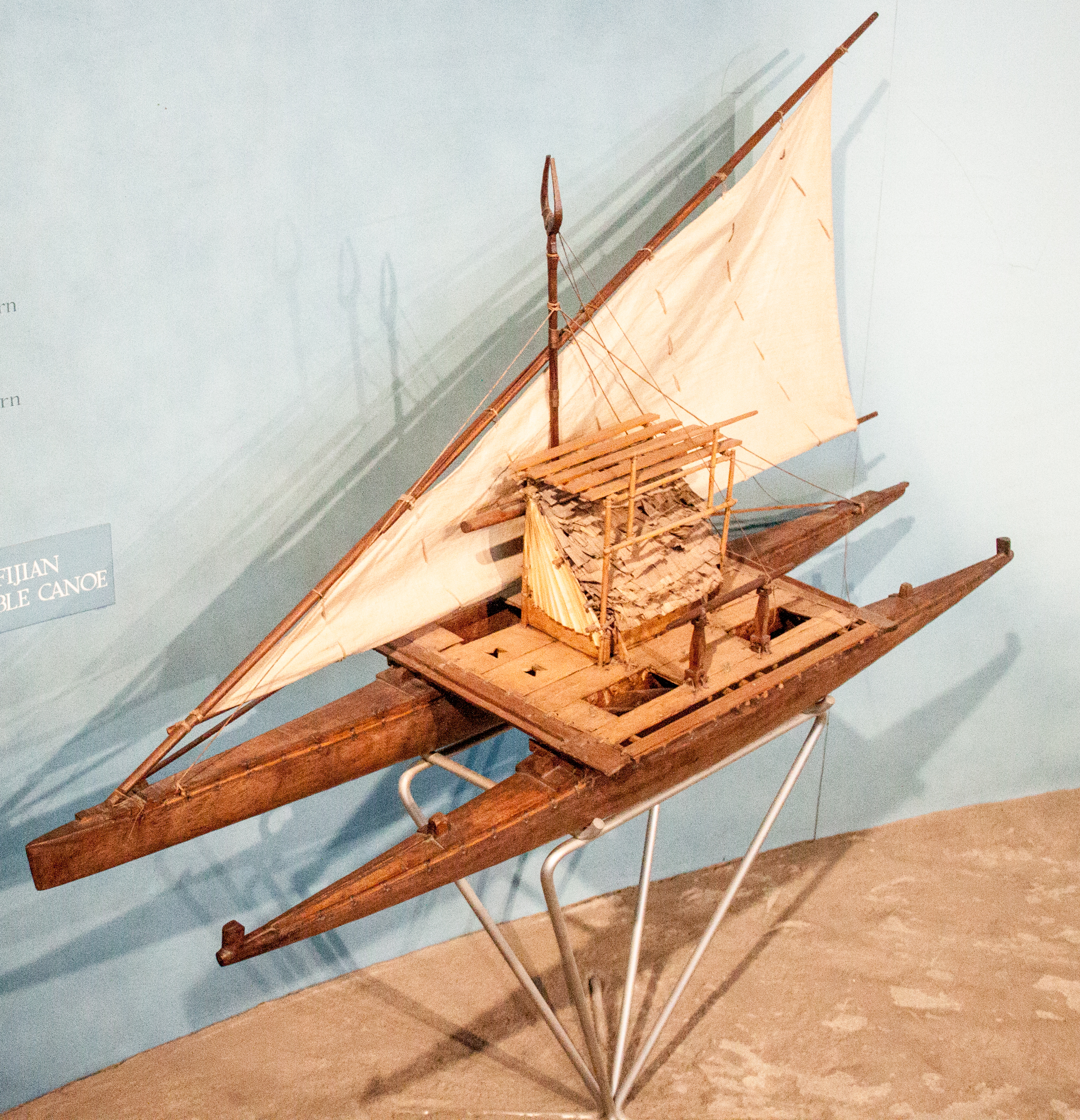
Model of a Fijian drua with a crab-claw sail from the Otago Museum, an example of an Austronesian ocean-going vessel

Roughly at this time is the last migration wave of the Austronesian expansion, when the Polynesian islands spread over vast distances across the Pacific Ocean were being colonized by the (Austronesian) Polynesians from Island Melanesia using double-hulled voyaging catamarans. At its furthest extent, there is a possibility that they may have reached the Americas. After the 11th century, a new type of ship called djong or jong was recorded in Java and Bali. This type of ship was built using wooden dowels and treenails, unlike the kunlun bo which used vegetal fibres for lashings.

The empire of Majapahit used jong, built in northern Java, for transporting troops overseas. The jongs were transport ships which could carry 100–2000 tons of cargo and 50–1000 people, 28.99–88.56 meter in length. The exact number of jong fielded by Majapahit is unknown, but the largest number of jong deployed in an expedition is about 400 jongs, when Majapahit attacked Pasai, in 1350.

==== Europe ====
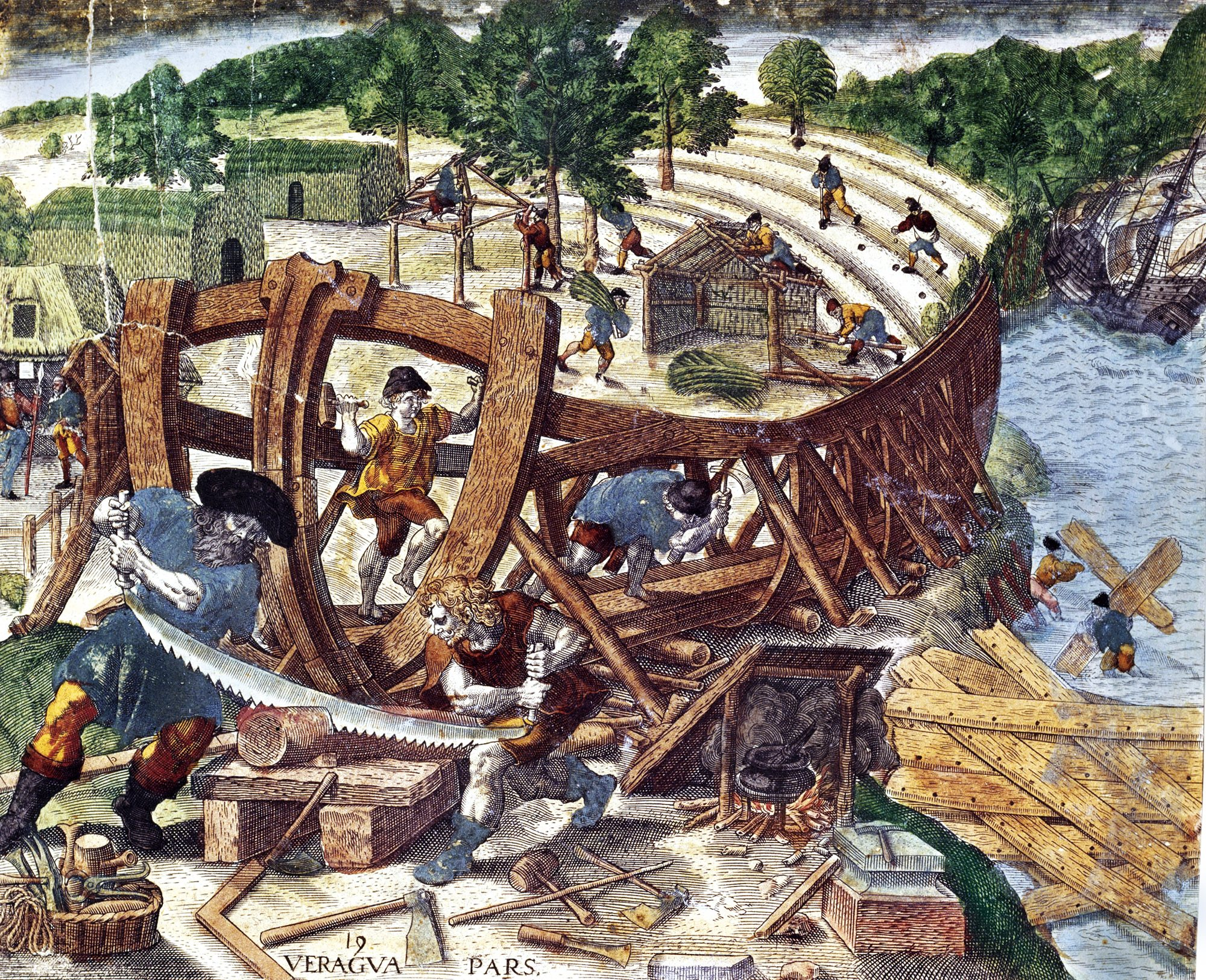
Shipwrights building a brigantine, 1541

Viking longships were seen as marking an advance on traditional clinker-built hulls where leather thongs were used to join plank boards. This consensus has been challenged. Haywood has argued that earlier Frankish and Anglo-Saxon nautical practice was much more accomplished than had been thought and has described the distribution of clinker vs. carvel construction in Western Europe (see map ). An insight into shipbuilding in the North Sea/Baltic areas of the early medieval period was found at Sutton Hoo, England, where a ship was buried with a chieftain. The ship was 26 metres (85 ft) long and 4.3 metres (14 ft) wide. Upward from the keel, the hull was made by overlapping nine strakes on either side with rivets fastening the oaken planks together. It could hold upwards of thirty men.

Sometime around the 12th century, northern European ships began to be built with a straight sternpost, enabling the mounting of a rudder, which was much more durable than a steering oar held over the side. Development in the Middle Ages favored "round ships", with a broad beam and heavily curved at both ends. Another important ship type was the galley, which was constructed with both sails and oars.

The first extant treatise on shipbuilding was written c. 1436 by Michael of Rhodes, a man who began his career as an oarsman on a Venetian galley in 1401 and worked his way up into officer positions. He wrote and illustrated a book that contains a treatise on shipbuilding, a treatise on mathematics, much material on astrology, and other materials. His treatise on shipbuilding treats three kinds of galleys and two kinds of round ships.

==== China ====
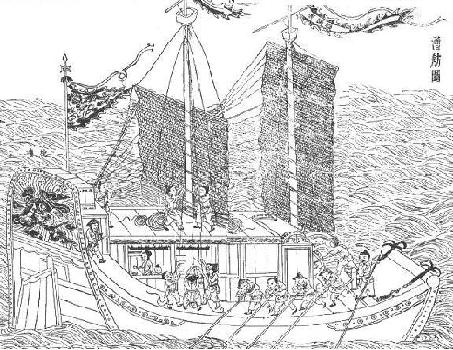
A two-masted Chinese junk, from the Tiangong Kaiwu of Song Yingxing, published in 1637

Shipbuilders in the Ming dynasty (c. 1368–1644) were not the same as the shipbuilders in other Chinese dynasties, due to hundreds of years of accumulated experiences and rapid changes in the Ming dynasty. Shipbuilders in the Ming dynasty primarily worked for the government, under command of the Ministry of Public Works.

During the early years of the Ming dynasty, the Ming government maintained an open policy towards sailing. Between 1405 and 1433, the government conducted seven diplomatic Ming treasure voyages to over thirty countries in Southeast Asia, India, the Middle East and Eastern Africa. The voyages were initiated by the Yongle Emperor, and led by the Admiral Zheng He. Six voyages were conducted under the Yongle Emperor's reign, the last of which returned to China in 1422. After the Yongle Emperor's death in 1424, his successor the Hongxi Emperor ordered the suspension of the voyages. The seventh and final voyage began in 1430, sent by the Xuande Emperor. Although the Hongxi and Xuande Emperors did not emphasize sailing as much as the Yongle Emperor, they were not against it. This led to a high degree of commercialization and an increase in trade. Large numbers of ships were built to meet the demand.

The Ming voyages were large in size, numbering as many as 300 ships and 28,000 men. The shipbuilders were brought from different places in China to the shipyard in Nanjing, including Zhejiang, Jiangxi, Fujian, and Huguang (now the provinces of Hubei and Hunan). One of the most famous shipyards was Long Jiang Shipyard (zh:龙江船厂), located in Nanjing near the Treasure Shipyard where the ocean-going ships were built. The shipbuilders could build 24 models of ships of varying sizes.

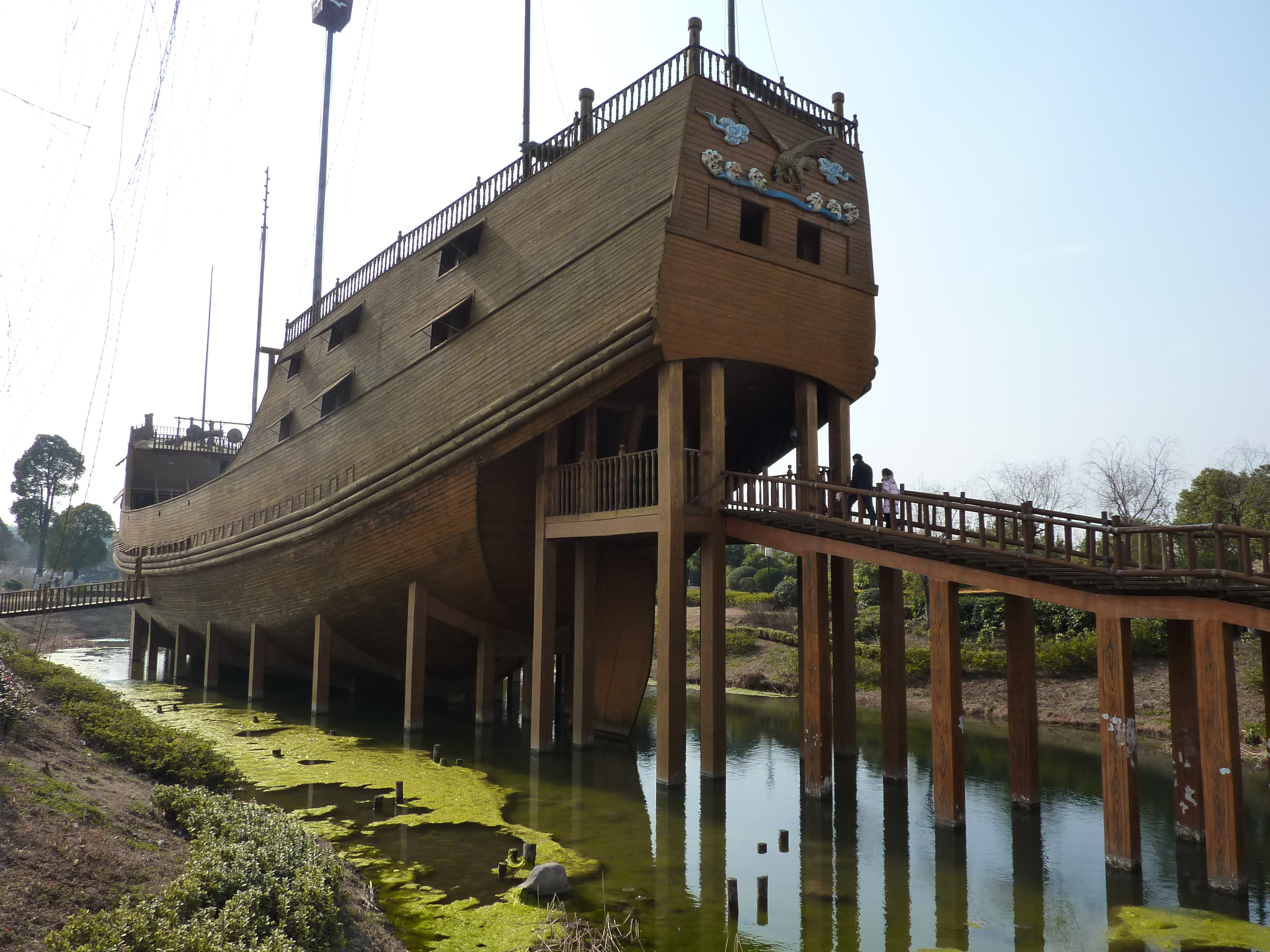
Full size replica of Zheng He's Treasure Ship

Several types of ships were built for the voyages, including Shachuan (沙船), Fuchuan (福船) and Baochuan (treasure ship) (宝船). Zheng He's treasure ships were regarded as Shachuan types, mainly because they were made in the treasure shipyard in Nanjing. Shachuan, or 'sand-ships', are ships used primarily for inland transport. However, in recent years, some researchers agree that the treasure ships were more of the Fuchuan type. It is said in vol. 176 of San Guo Bei Meng Hui Bian (三朝北盟汇编) that ships made in Fujian are the best ones. Therefore, the best shipbuilders and laborers were brought from these places to support Zheng He's expedition.

The shipyard was under the command of Ministry of Public Works. The shipbuilders had no control over their lives. The builders, commoner's doctors, cooks and errands had lowest social status. The shipbuilders were forced to move away from their hometown to the shipyards. There were two major ways to enter the shipbuilder occupation: family tradition, or apprenticeship. If a shipbuilder entered the occupation due to family tradition, the shipbuilder learned the techniques of shipbuilding from his family and is very likely to earn a higher status in the shipyard. Additionally, the shipbuilder had access to business networking that could help to find clients. If a shipbuilder entered the occupation through an apprenticeship, the shipbuilder was likely a farmer before he was hired as a shipbuilder, or he was previously an experienced shipbuilder.

Many shipbuilders working in the shipyard were forced into the occupation. The ships built for Zheng He's voyages needed to be waterproof, solid, safe, and have ample room to carry large amounts of trading goods. Therefore, due to the highly commercialized society that was being encouraged by the expeditions, trades, and government policies, the shipbuilders needed to acquire the skills to build ships that fulfil these requirements.

Shipbuilding was not the sole industry utilising Chinese lumber at that time; the new capital was being built in Beijing from approximately 1407 onwards, which required huge amounts of high-quality wood. These two ambitious projects commissioned by Emperor Yongle would have had enormous environmental and economic effects, even if the ships were half the dimensions given in the History of Ming. Considerable pressure would also have been placed on the infrastructure required to transport the trees from their point of origin to the shipyards.

Shipbuilders were usually divided into different groups and had separate jobs. Some were responsible for fixing old ships; some were responsible for making the keel and some were responsible for building the helm.

- It was the keel that determined the shape and the structure of the hull of Fuchuan Ships. The keel is the middle of the bottom of the hull, constructed by connecting three sections; stern keel, main keel and poop keel. The hull spreads in the arc towards both sides forming the keel.
- The helm was the device that controls direction when sailing. It was a critical invention in shipbuilding technique in ancient China and was only used by the Chinese for a fairly long time. With a developing recognition of its function, the shape and configuration of the helm was continually improved by shipbuilders. The shipbuilders not only needed to build the ship according to design, but needed to acquire the skills to improve the ships.

After 1477, the Ming government reversed its open maritime policies, enacting a series of isolationist policies in response to piracy. The policies, called Haijin (sea ban), lasted until the end of the Ming dynasty in 1644. During this period, Chinese navigation technology did not make any progress and even declined in some aspect.

==== Indian Ocean ====
In the Islamic world, shipbuilding thrived at Basra and Alexandria. The dhow, felucca, baghlah, and the sambuk became symbols of successful maritime trade around the Indian Ocean from the ports of East Africa to Southeast Asia and the ports of Sindh and Hind (India) during the Abbasid period.

=== Early modern ===
==== Bengal ====
Mughal Empire had a large shipbuilding industry, which was largely centred in the Bengal Subah. Economic historian Indrajit Ray estimates shipbuilding output of Bengal during the sixteenth and seventeenth centuries at 223,250 tons annually, compared with 23,061 tons produced in nineteen colonies in North America from 1769 to 1771. He also assesses ship repairing as very advanced in Bengal.

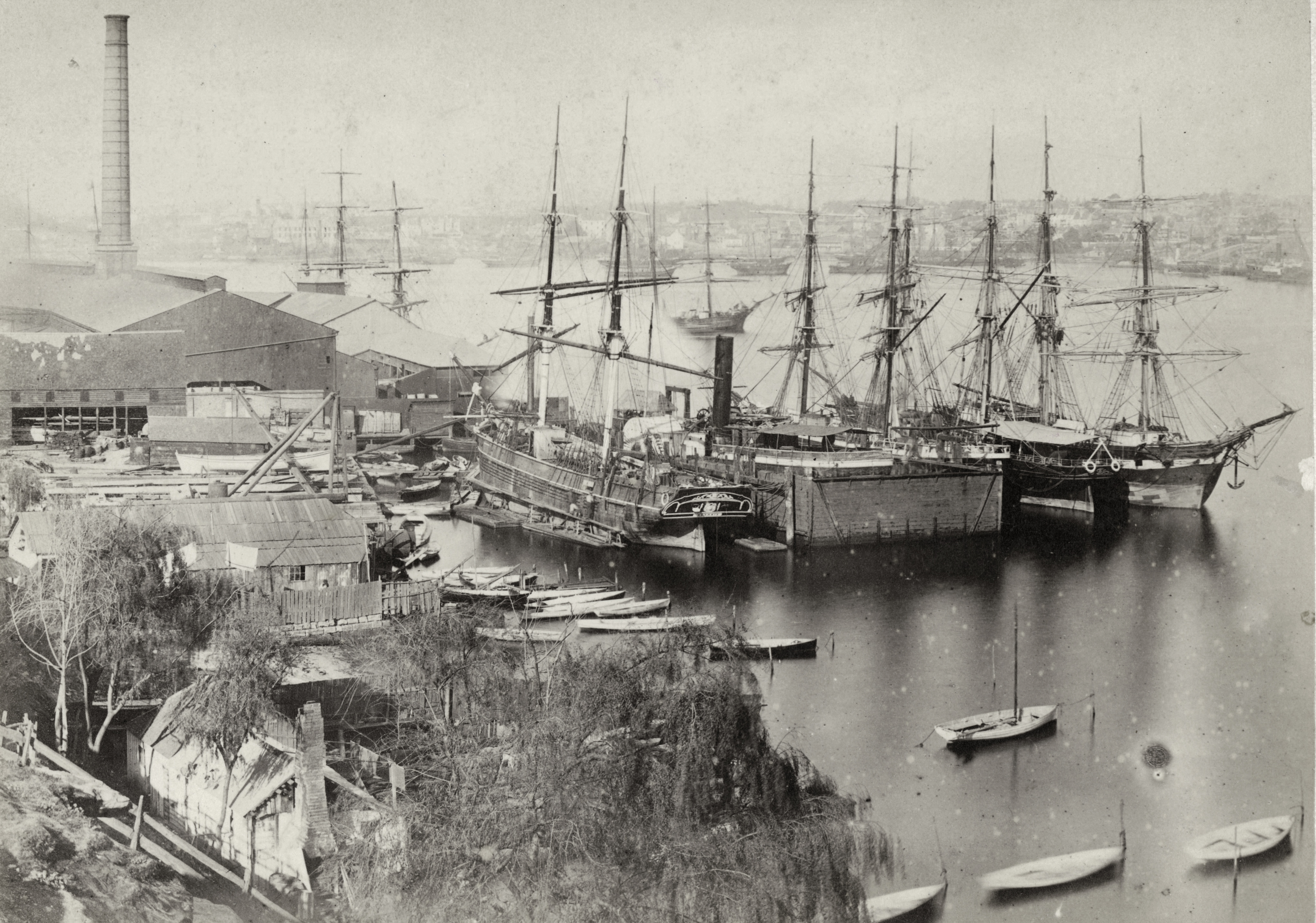
Shipwrights at work, Darling Harbour, Port Jackson, Sydney, 1878

==== West Africa ====
Documents from 1506, for example, refer to watercraft on the Sierra Leone river carrying 120 men. Others refer to Guinea coast peoples using war canoes of varying sizes – some 70 feet in length, 7–8 feet broad, with sharp pointed ends, rowing benches on the side, and quarterdecks or forecastles build of reeds. The watercraft included miscellaneous facilities, such as cooking hearths, and storage spaces for the crew's sleeping mats.

From the 17th century, some kingdoms added brass or iron cannons to their vessels. By the 18th century, however, the use of swivel cannons on war canoes accelerated. The city-state of Lagos, for instance, deployed war canoes armed with swivel cannons.

==== Europe ====
With the development of the carrack, the west moved into a new era of ship construction by building the first regular oceangoing vessels. In a relatively short time, these ships grew to an unprecedented size, complexity, and cost.

The United Kingdom was one of the principal shipping nations in the 19th century. By 1815, at the end of the Napoleonic wars, the tonnage of the mercantile marine in the United Kingdom was roughly twice that of the United States. Britain also was a major shipbuilding nation. By 1841, there were 20,424 men and boys employed in building ships in the United Kingdom.

Shipyards became large industrial complexes, and the ships built were financed by consortia of investors. These considerations led to the documentation of design and construction practices in what had previously been a secretive trade run by master shipwrights and ultimately led to the field of naval architecture, in which professional designers and draftsmen played an increasingly important role. Even so, construction techniques changed only very gradually. The ships of the Napoleonic Wars were still built more or less to the same basic plan as those of the Spanish Armada of two centuries earlier, although there had been numerous subtle improvements in ship design and construction throughout this period. For instance, the introduction of tumblehome, adjustments to the shapes of sails and hulls, the introduction of the wheel, the introduction of hardened copper fastenings below the waterline, the introduction of copper sheathing as a deterrent to shipworm and fouling, etc.

=== Industrial Revolution ===
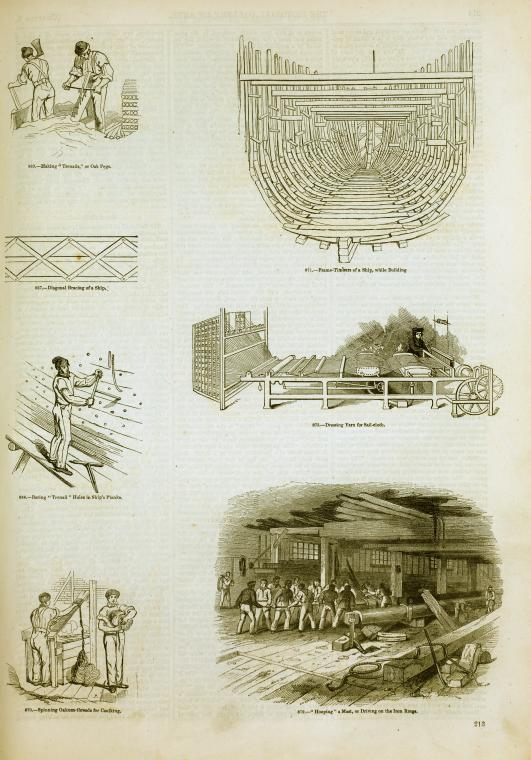
Illustration of some shipbuilding methods in England, 1858

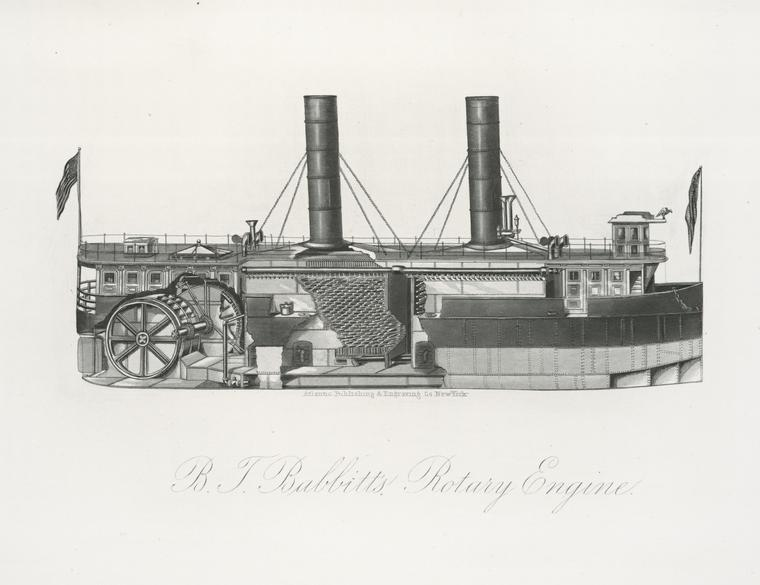
Babbitt's rotary engine

Initially copying wooden construction traditions with a frame over which the hull was fastened, Isambard Kingdom Brunel's Great Britain of 1843 was the first radical new design, being built entirely of wrought iron. Despite her success, and the great savings in cost and space provided by the iron hull, compared to a copper-sheathed counterpart, there remained problems with fouling due to the adherence of weeds and barnacles. As a result, composite construction remained the dominant approach where fast ships were required, with wooden timbers laid over an iron frame (Cutty Sark is a famous example). Later Great Britain's iron hull was sheathed in wood to enable it to carry a copper-based sheathing. Brunel's Great Eastern represented the next great development in shipbuilding. Built-in association with John Scott Russell, it used longitudinal stringers for strength, inner and outer hulls, and bulkheads to form multiple watertight compartments. Steel also supplanted wrought iron when it became readily available in the latter half of the 19th century, providing great savings when compared with iron in cost and weight. Wood continued to be favored for the decks.

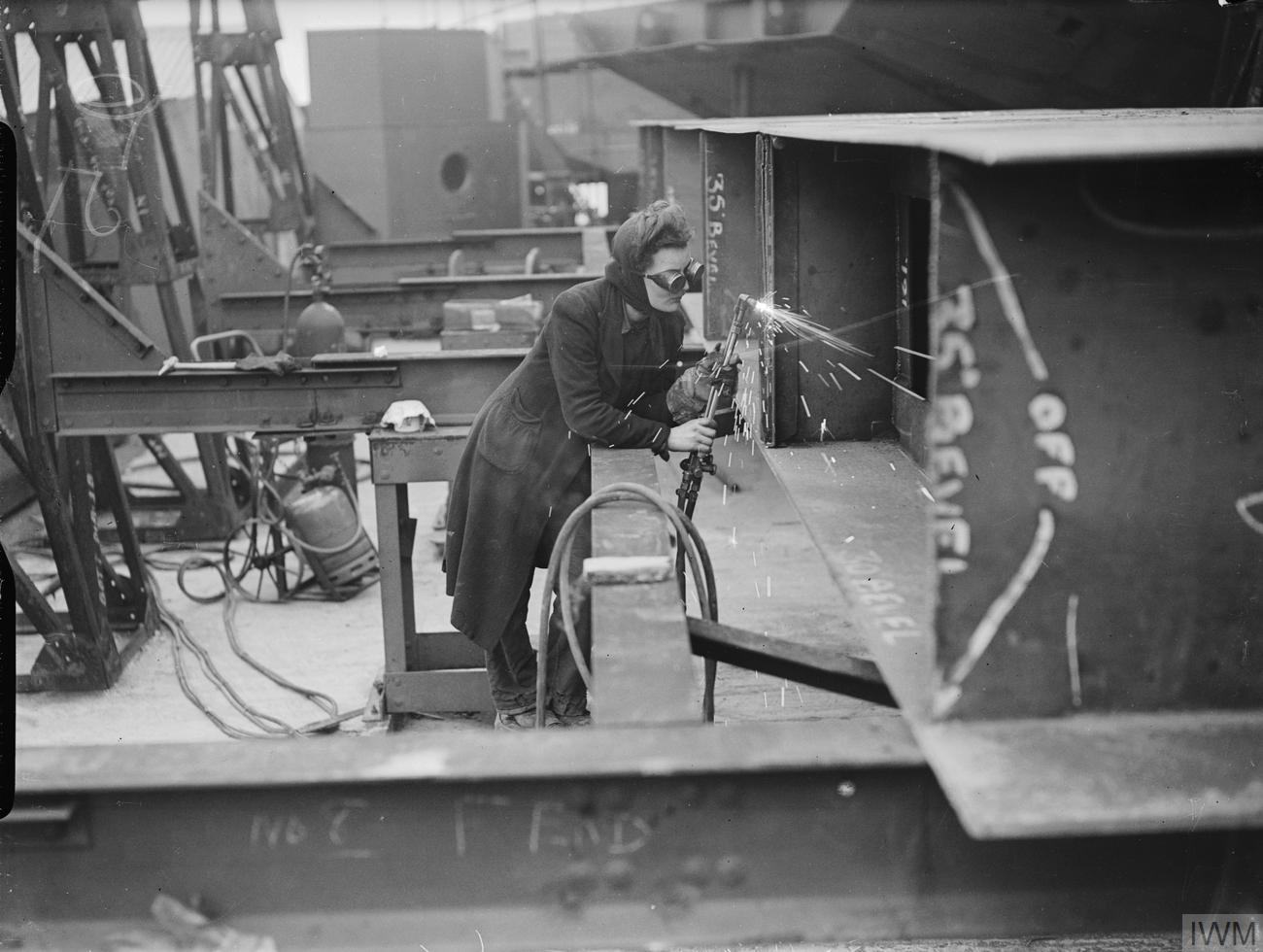
A welder building a prefabricated ship in Hessle, England, during World War II

During World War II, the need for cargo ships was so great that construction time for Liberty ships went from initially eight months or longer, down to weeks or even days. They employed production line and prefabrication techniques such as those used in shipyards today. The total number of dry-cargo ships built in the United States in a 15-year period just before the war was a grand total of two. During the war, thousands of Liberty ships and Victory ships were built, many of them in shipyards that did not exist before the war. And, they were built by a workforce consisting largely of women and other inexperienced workers who had never seen a ship before (or even the ocean).

== Worldwide shipbuilding industry ==
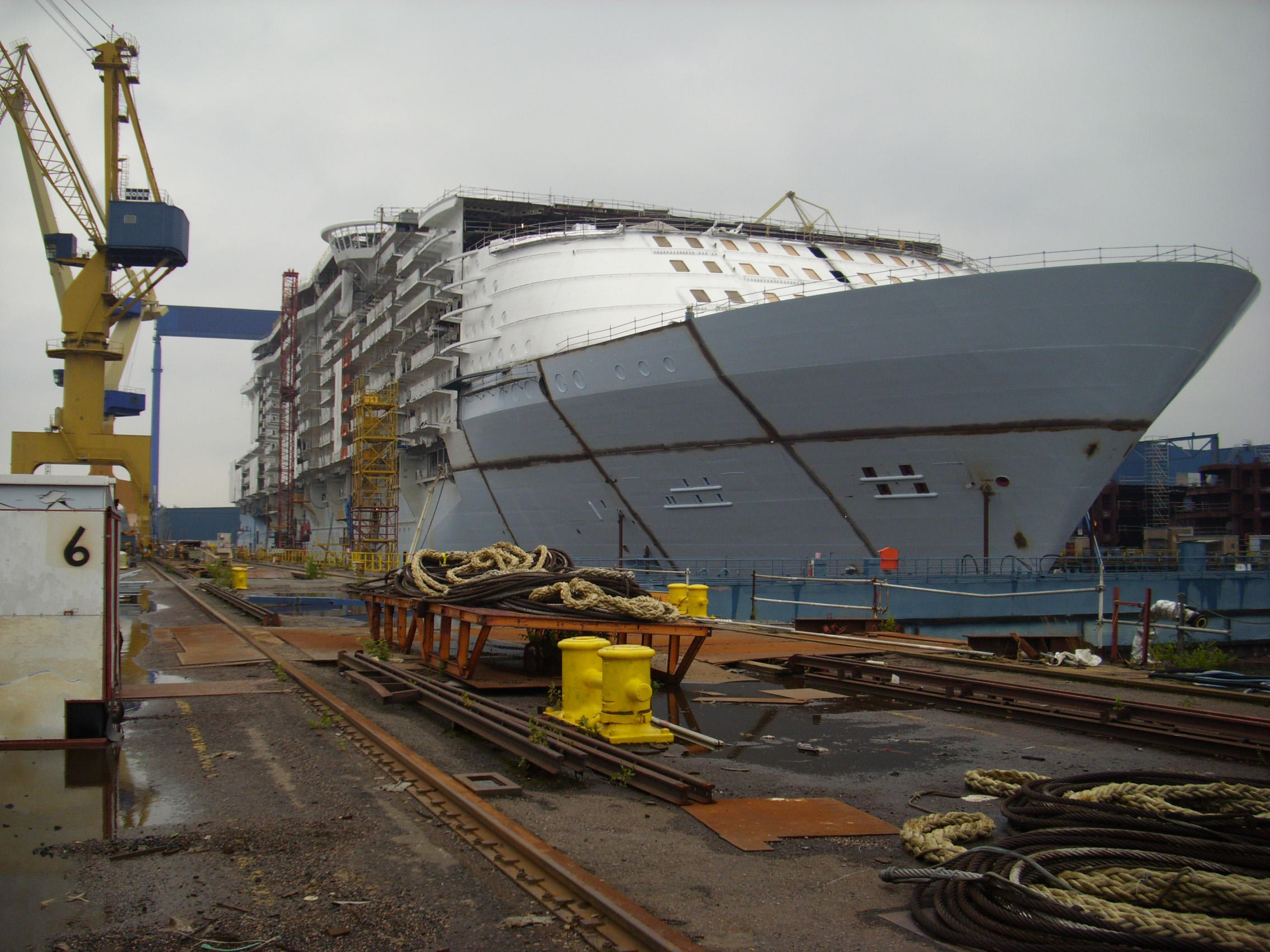
MS Oasis of the Seas, the fifth largest passenger ship in the world, under construction at the Meyer Turku shipyard in Finland

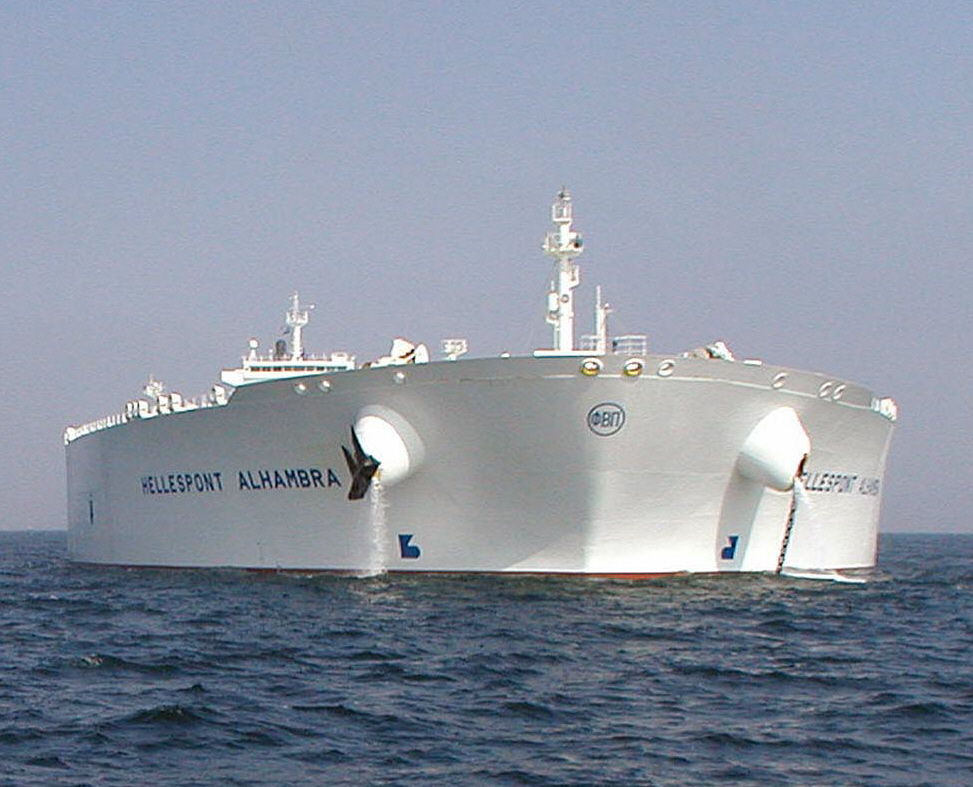
A TI-class supertanker built by Daewoo Shipbuilding & Marine Engineering in Okpo-dong, South Korea

After World War II, shipbuilding (which encompasses the shipyards, the marine equipment manufacturers, and many related service and knowledge providers) grew as an important and strategic industry in a number of countries around the world. This importance stems from:

- The large number of skilled workers required directly by the shipyard, along with supporting industries such as steel mills, railroads and engine manufacturers; and
- A nation's need to manufacture and repair its own navy and vessels that support its primary industries

Historically, the industry has suffered from the absence of global rules and a tendency towards state-supported over-investment due to the fact that shipyards offer a wide range of technologies, employ a significant number of workers, and generate income as the shipbuilding market is global.

Japan used shipbuilding in the 1950s and 1960s to rebuild its industrial structure; South Korea started to make shipbuilding a strategic industry in the 1970s, and China is now in the process of repeating these models with large state-supported investments in this industry.

As a result, the world shipbuilding market suffers from over-capacities, depressed prices, low profit margins, trade distortions and widespread subsidization. All efforts to address the problems in the OECD have so far failed, with a 1994 international shipbuilding agreement never entering into force and a 2003–2005 round of negotiations ending in no agreement. After numerous efforts to restart negotiations, talks were formally terminated in December 2010.

Where state subsidies have been removed and domestic industrial policies do not provide support in high labor cost countries, shipbuilding has gone into decline. The British shipbuilding industry is a prime example of this with its industries suffering badly from the 1960s. In the early 1970s British yards still had the capacity to build all types and sizes of merchant ships but today they have been reduced to a small number specialising in defence contracts, luxury yachts and repair work. Decline has also occurred in other European countries, although to some extent this has reduced by protective measures and industrial support policies. In the US, the Jones Act (which places restrictions on the ships that can be used for moving domestic cargoes) has meant that merchant shipbuilding has continued, albeit at a reduced rate, but such protection has failed to penalise shipbuilding inefficiencies. The consequence of this is that contract prices are far higher than those of any other country building oceangoing ships.

=== Present day shipbuilding ===
Beyond the 2000s, the three East Asian manufacturing powerhouses, China, South Korea and Japan, have dominated world shipbuilding by completed gross tonnage. China State Shipbuilding Corporation, China Shipbuilding Industry Corporation, Hyundai Heavy Industries, Samsung Heavy Industries, Hanwha Ocean and Imabari Shipbuilding supply most of the global market for large container, bulk carrier, tanker and Ro-ro ships. During the early 2020s, Chinese shipbuilders saw an increase in orders as operators demand greener fleets. As of 2023, China's shipbuilding output, newly received orders and orders-on-hand accounted for 50%, 67%, and 55% of the global market share, respectively, with double-digital growth of all three indexes compared to the previous year. According to a September 2023 report by the Alliance for American Manufacturing (based on a leaked presentation slide from an earlier USN briefing, verified by the Office of Naval Intelligence), China's shipbuilding capacity is 232 times greater than the United States, with a manufacturing capacity of roughly 23,250,000 tons compared to less than 100,000 tons by U.S. shipyards.

When referring to the ship type, then China, South Korea and Japan are the producing countries of the carrier ships as mentioned above. While Italy, France, Finland, Germany, United Kingdom and other European countries are the makers of cruise ships (the most), icebreakers, crane vessel and so on.

The market share of European ship builders began to decline in the 1960s as they lost work to Japan in the same way Japan most recently lost their work to South Korea and China. Over the four years from 2007, the total number of employees in the European shipbuilding industry declined from 150,000 to 115,000. In 2022, some key shipbuilders in Europe are BAE Systems, Fincantieri, Damen Group, Meyer Werft Navantia, and Naval Group.

Shipbuilding output of the United States also underwent a similar change. The US is ranked the 10th largest shipbuilder worldwide. The top companies that build large naval vessels, such as aircraft carriers and cruisers, include Huntington Ingalls, Bollinger and General Dynamics. In the small to medium military vessels category, key shipbuilders include Vigor Industrial, and VT Halter Marine. As the US Navy is shifting to a new fleet architecture that is more widely distributed, unmanned surface vehicles (USVs) development is rapidly propelled to higher priority. Key strategic Program of Record includes prototyping and construction of up to 9 MUSVs, for which a sole contract was awarded to L3Harris Technologies, who partnered with Swiftships to build the MUSVs.

In 2018, the US Defense Department initiated Overlord Program, and developed USV Prototypes 1 (NOMAD) and 2 (RANGER). Both of them took part in multiple fleet level exercises and demonstrations, traveled 28,982 nautical miles (53,675 km) in autonomous mode, and tested numerous payloads. Nomam, formerly known as Riley Claire, is a converted offshore patrol vessel, which was built by Swiftships. The objective of the Ghost Fleet Overlord program is to convert large, commercial vessels to autonomous systems.

As of 2024, China builds nearly 75% of new vessels on order according to the annual report by BRS Shipbrokers, and has the capacity to build more ships in one month than the United States builds in a year.

=== Modern shipbuilding manufacturing techniques ===
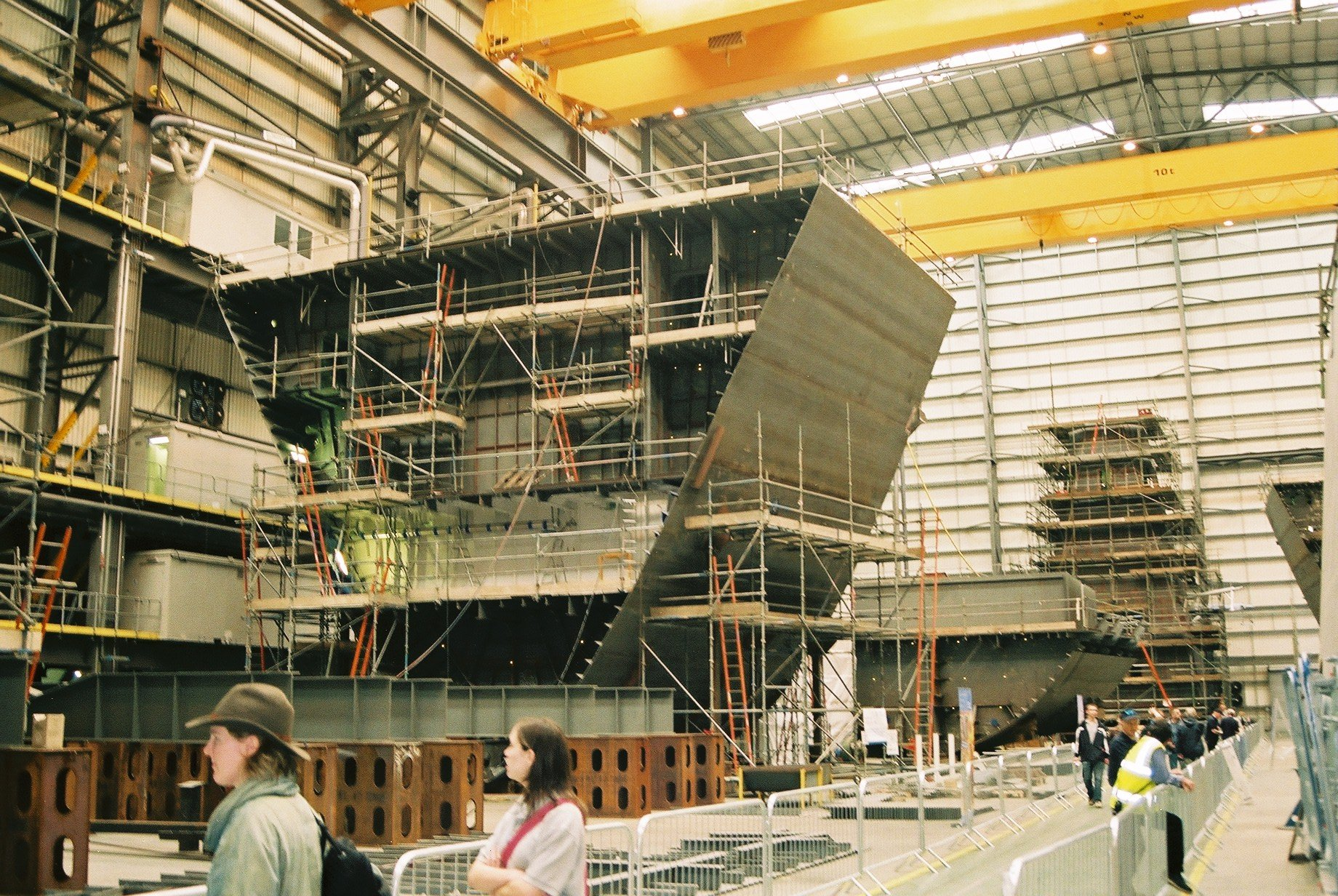
Construction of prefabricated module blocks of HMS Dauntless at BAE's Portsmouth Shipyard

Modern shipbuilding makes considerable use of prefabricated modular sections. Entire multi-deck segments of the hull or superstructure will be built elsewhere in the yard, transported to the building dock or slipway, then lifted into place. This is known as "block construction". The most modern shipyards pre-install equipment, pipes, electrical cables, and any other components within the blocks, to minimize the effort needed to assemble or install components deep within the hull once it is welded together.

Ship design work, also called naval architecture, may be conducted using a ship model basin. Previously, loftsmen at the mould lofts of shipyards were responsible for taking the dimensions, and details from drawings and plans and translating this information into templates, battens, ordinates, cutting sketches, profiles, margins and other data. However, since the early 1970s computer-aided design became normal for the shipbuilding design and lofting process.

Modern ships, since roughly 1940, have been produced almost exclusively of welded steel. Early welded steel ships used steels with inadequate fracture toughness, which resulted in some ships suffering catastrophic brittle fracture structural cracks (see problems of the Liberty ship). Since roughly 1950, specialized steels such as ABS Steels with good properties for ship construction have been used. Although it is commonly accepted that modern steel has eliminated brittle fracture in ships, some controversy still exists. Brittle fracture of modern vessels continues to occur from time to time because grade A and grade B steel of unknown toughness or fracture appearance transition temperature (FATT) in ships' side shells can be less than adequate for all ambient conditions.

As modern shipbuilding panels on a panel line become lighter and thinner, the laser hybrid welding technique is utilized. The laser hybrid blend focuses a higher energy beam on the material to be joined, allowing it to keyhole with a much higher depth to width ratio than comparative traditional welding techniques. Typically a MIG process trails the keyhole providing filler material for the weld joint. This allows for very high penetration without excessive heat input from decreased weld metal deposited leading to less distortion and welding at higher travel speeds.

=== Ship repair industry ===
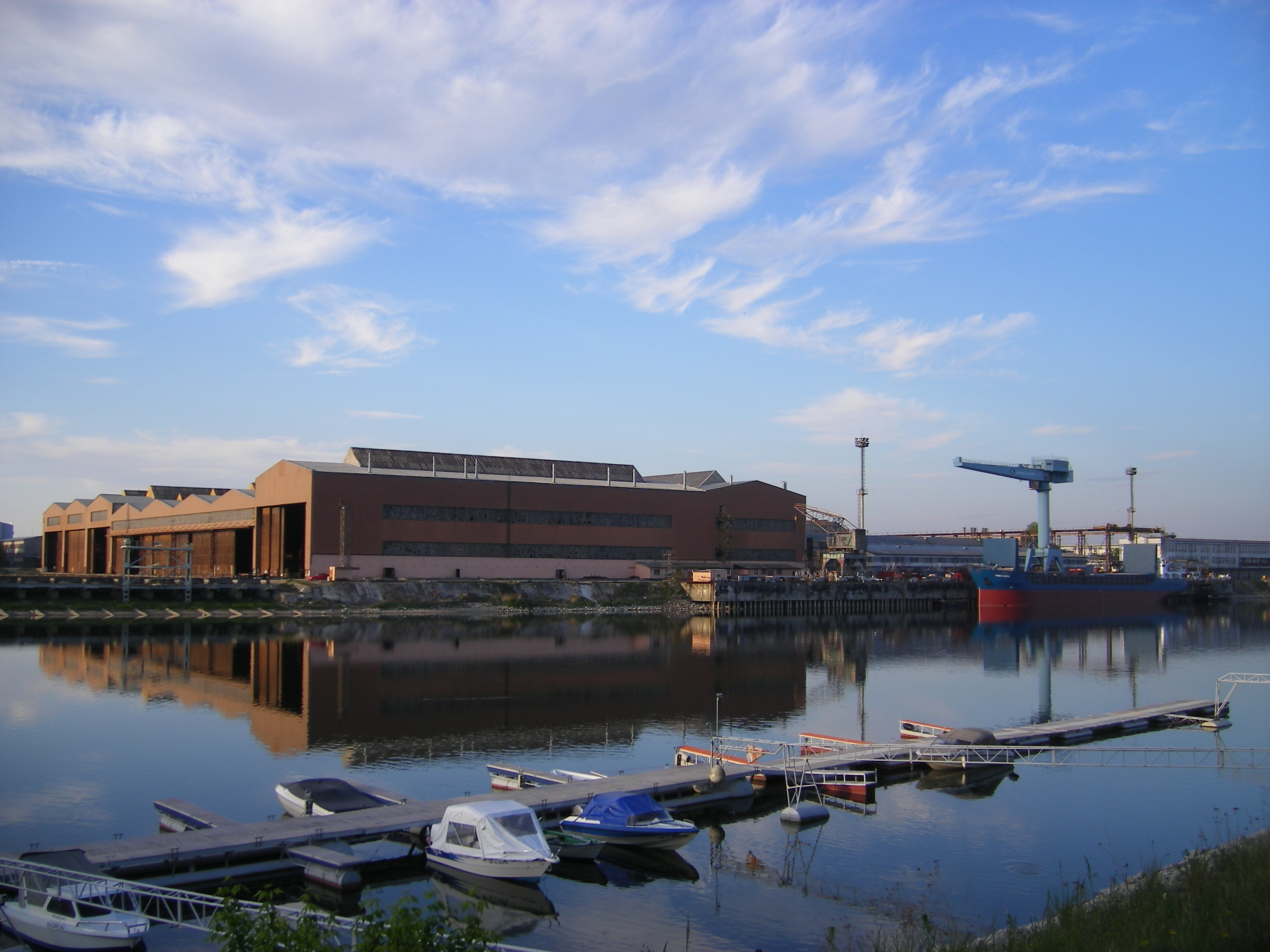
River shipyard in Komárno (Slovakia)

All ships need repair work at some point in their working lives. A part of these jobs must be carried out under the supervision of the classification society.

A lot of maintenance is carried out while at sea or in port by ship's crew. However, a large number of repair and maintenance works can only be carried out while the ship is out of commercial operation, in a ship repair yard.

Prior to undergoing repairs, a tanker must dock at a deballasting station for completing the tank cleaning operations and pumping ashore its slops (dirty cleaning water and hydrocarbon residues).

== See also ==
- Ancient shipbuilding techniques
- Boat building
- List of shipbuilders and shipyards
- List of the largest shipbuilding companies
- List of Russian marine engineers
- Ships of ancient Rome
- Marine propulsion – Systems for generating thrust for ships and boats on water
- Shipbuilding in the American colonies
