= Luís de Camões-class logistics support vessel =

Class of Portuguese auxiliary ships

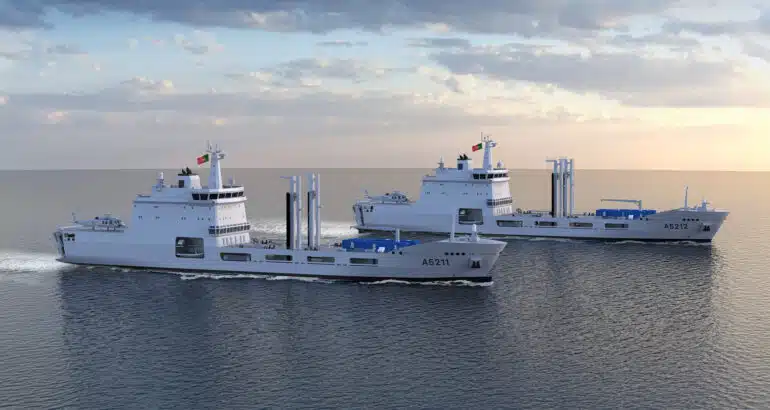
- Artist impression

Class overview
- Builders: STM (design), Istanbul; Ada Shipyard (construction), Istanbul
- Operators: Portuguese Navy
- Preceded by: Bérrio class
- Cost: €100 million (2024) (equivalent to €100.94 million in 2025) for 2 units
- Built: 2025-present
- Planned: 2
- Building: 2

General characteristics
- Type: Auxiliary oiler replenishment and logistics support vessel
- Displacement: 11,000 t (11,000 long tons)
- Length: 137 m (449 ft 6 in)
- Beam: 19.10 m (62 ft 8 in)
- Draught: 6.70 m (22 ft 0 in)
- Speed: 18 knots (33 km/h; 21 mph) (maximum)
- Range: 14,000 nmi (26,000 km) at 14 knots (26 km/h; 16 mph)
- Endurance: 90 days
- Capacity: 100 persons; 4,000 m^{3} (140,000 cu ft) F-76 marine diesel; 350 m^{3} (12,000 cu ft) F-44 jet fuel; 650 m^{3} (23,000 cu ft) fresh water; 700 m^{3} (25,000 cu ft) general cargo; 20 × light tactical armored vehicles; 6 × TEU shipping containers
- Crew: 100
- Armament: 2 × Phalanx CIWS
- Aircraft carried: 1 × helicopter/UAV
- Aviation facilities: Aft helicopter deck and hangar

The Luís de Camões class is a class of two auxiliary oiler replenishment (AOR) and logistics support vessels currently under construction for the Portuguese Navy. Designed by the Turkish defense company STM and built at the Ada Shipyard in Istanbul, the class is intended to restore Portugal's independent blue-water logistics capability, which was lost following the decommissioning of the fleet tanker NRP Bérrio in 2020.

The lead ship, NRP Luís de Camões, is scheduled for delivery in April 2028, followed by the NRP Fernando Pessoa in December of the same year. Beyond traditional fleet refueling, the vessels are designed as multi-purpose platforms capable of humanitarian aid, disaster relief, and support for amphibious operations.

== Design and Development ==
=== Background ===
For decades, the Portuguese Navy relied on NRP Bérrio to sustain long-range deployments. After the Bérrio was scrapped due to structural issues and aging systems, the Portuguese government initiated the Navio Reabastecedor de Esquadra e Logístico (NRE+) program. This project was funded under the Military Programming Law (LPM) with a budget of approximately €100 million for two units.

In December 2024, the Portuguese Navy signed a contract with the Turkish firm STM for the design and construction of the vessels. This marked a milestone as the first time a NATO and European Union member state imported a naval project of this scale from Turkey.

=== Construction ===
The construction of the class officially began with the steel-cutting ceremony for the lead ship, Luís de Camões, on 14 November 2025. The keel was subsequently laid on 29 January 2026. While the primary hulls are being constructed in Turkey, the project includes significant Portuguese industrial participation, specifically in the integration of command, control, and communication systems.

Steel cutting for the second ship, Fernando Pessoa, took place on 18 June 2026, followed by the keel laying ceremony on 20 October 2026.

== Ships in class ==
Hull number	Name	Builder	Laid down	Launched	Commissioned	Decommissioned	Status	Notes
A5211	Luís de Camões	Ada Shipyard, Istanbul	29 January 2026		2028 (planned)		Under construction	
A5212	Fernando Pessoa (Note: Originally named D. Dinis for Dinis of Portugal, before being renamed during the keel laying ceremony.)	Ada Shipyard, Istanbul	20 October 2026		2028 (planned)		Under construction	
