= Beșiktaș Shipyard =

Shipyard in Yalova, Turkey

Coordinates: 40.7107°N 29.4737°E

Beșiktaș Shipyard (Turkish: Beșiktaș Tersanesi) is a Turkish shipyard established in Altınova, Yalova in 2007.

== See also ==
- List of shipbuilders and shipyards
