= Art Shipyard =

Turkish shipyard

Coordinates: 40.8523°N 29.2897°E

Art Shipyard (Turkish: Art Tersanesi) is a Turkish shipyard established in Tuzla, Istanbul in 1975.

== See also ==
- List of shipbuilders and shipyards
