= Inebolu Shipyard =

Coordinates: 41°58′39.32″N 33°46′8.73″E

The Inebolu Shipyard (Russian: Судоремонтный завод «Инеболу») is located on Turkey's Black Sea coast in the town of Inebolu, Kastamonu Province. It is Turkey's only shipyard on the Black Sea. It operates a floating dock with a 4,500 ton lifting capacity, which can handle about 12,000 dwt vessels.

== History ==
The shipyard was founded by the group of companies "Karavelioglu Group" in 2008. For some time, about 2–3 years after the start of operation, the shipyard was not very popular in the international community of shipowners and worked only with local enterprises. The functionality and capabilities of the shipyard have increased over several years to a good competitive scale and at present the shipyard serves both Turkish and foreign vessels, regardless of the flag and registration of the vessel. Today, the Inebolu Shipyard produces all types of repairs - from emergency to class.

The geographical location of the shipyard is most suitable for ships sailing from the Black Sea and seaports of Russia, Ukraine, Bulgaria, Romania, Georgia and other countries.

The group of companies "Karavelioglu Group" was founded in 1916 by brothers Osman Azmi Karavelioglu and Cemal Azmi Karavelioglu and was the official dealer of Shell and Mobil. The main activity was the sale of petroleum products and marine fuel. After more than sixty years from the beginning of its professional activity, the company has grown to a grandiose scale and already in 1980 was considered the largest bunker dealer in the Marmara region and at the same time the oldest bunkering company in Turkey.

From 1960 to 2008, the group of companies "Karavelioglu Group" worked with the largest suppliers such as: Shell, Mobil, Ditaş, BP, Perenco and other world traders. At the same time, the company acquired a tanker fleet and took over the management of tankers of third-party ship-owning companies.

Today, "Karavelioglu Group", in addition to ship repair services, is also engaged in activities in the sectors of tourism and building.

The Chief Executive Officer (CEO) of the company is. Mr Ihsan Karavelioglu

== Shipyard facilities ==
- Total area - 70,000 m2
- Management building;
- The floating workshop, 3 floors, 65 x 15 m;
- A full range of equipment for cleaning and washing vessels before painting;
- A metalworking shop and a machine-assembly shop 80 x 20 meters;
- Floating dock No. 1, has the ability to handle vessels up to 130 m length and up to 19.5 m width (lifting capacity - 4500 tons);
- Three repair berth from 120 to 180 meters in length can handle vessels with a draft of 8 to 10.5 m;
- 3 Cranes up to 40 meters and lifting capacity from 10 to 25 tons;
- Tug LOA 36.75 m Width 9.10 m, BP 24.9 tons;
- Line Handling Boat Loa 7 m Width 3 m, 255 L/s
- Accommodation facilities for engineers and workers up to 90 persons

== Activities ==
- Shipbuilding;
- Ship repair;

== See also ==
- List of shipbuilders and shipyards
