= Boğaziçi Shipyard =

Coordinates: 40.7221°N 29.4895°E

Boğaziçi Shipyard (Turkish: Boğaziçi Tersanesi) is a Turkish shipyard established in Kadikoy, Istanbul, in 1992. The company's head office located in Istanbul, Turkey, new shipbuilding facilities located in Yalova Turkey.

== See also ==
- List of shipbuilders and shipyards
