= ASTAS & SELTAS Shipyards =

Turkish shipyard

ASTAS & SELTAS Shipyards (Turkish: Astaş Aslan Tersanecilik) is a Turkish shipyard established in Istanbul in 1982.

Family business that started with the repair and construction of wooden boats in Haliç-Hasköy in the 1940s. Construction and repair of the steel ships started in 1982.

== See also ==
- List of shipbuilders and shipyards
