= List of the largest shipbuilding companies =

This is a list of the largest shipbuilding companies in 2016 (only companies with revenue of $5 bln. and more are listed):

Rank	Company name	Primary Industry	2024 Revenue (USD billion)	2016 Revenue (USD billion)	2015 Revenue (USD billion)	2010 Revenue (USD billion)	2009 Revenue (USD billion)	2008 Revenue (USD billion)	Headquarters	Founded	Employees (thousands)	Executive head
1	HD Hyundai Heavy Industries	Shipbuilding	$8.9	$33.89	$39.33	$19.67			Ulsan, South Korea	1972	26.0 (2011)	Lee Sang-kyun, President&CEO
2	Mitsubishi Heavy Industries	Conglomerate	$35.97	$28.952	$39.10			$41.87	Tokyo, Japan	1934	63.5 (2011)	Kazuo Tsukuda, Chairman; Hideaki Omiya, President
3	China Shipbuilding Industry Corporation	Shipbuilding		$42.15		$10.36			Beijing, China	1999		
4	China State Shipbuilding Corporation	Shipbuilding	$10.291	$29.88					Shanghai, China	2019		
5	STX Offshore & Shipbuilding	Shipbuilding		$16.96		$13.40			Jinhae, South Korea	1962		Jang Yoon-Gun, Chairman
6	DSME	Shipbuilding		$10.98	$12.76	$11.40			Seoul, South Korea	1978	25.0 (2010)	Nam Sang-tae, President&CEO
7	Samsung Heavy Industries	Shipbuilding		$8.98	$8.58			$8.40	Geoje, South Korea	1974	12.5 (2009)	Kim Jing-Wan, Vice Chairman&CEO
8	Sumitomo Heavy Industries	Conglomerate		$6.59	$6.02 (2014)			$3.80	Tokyo, Japan	1888	14.8 (2010)	
9	Fincantieri	Shipbuilding	$8.47	$5.17					Trieste, Italy	1937	22.5 (2024)	
10	United Shipbuilding Corporation	Shipbuilding		$5.1					Saint Petersburg, Russia	2007		

== See also ==
- List of shipbuilders and shipyards
