= Çeksan Shipyard =

Shipyard in Istanbul, Turkey

Coordinates: 40.8502°N 29.2924°E

- Founded: 1960
- Headquarters: Istanbul, Turkey

Çeksan Shipyard (Turkish: Çeksan Tersanesi) is a Turkish shipyard established in Istanbul in 1960.

== See also ==
- List of shipbuilders and shipyards
