= Argem Shipyard =

Shipyard in Istanbul

Argem Shipyard (Turkish: Argem Tersanesi) is a Turkish shipyard established in Tuzla, Istanbul, in 1999.

== See also ==
- List of shipbuilders and shipyards
