= Odessos Shiprepair Yard =

Odessos Shiprepair Yard S.A.
- Type: Public company
- Industry: Shipyard
- Founded: Varna, Bulgaria (1955)
- Headquarters: Varna, Bulgaria, Bulgaria
- Area served: Worldwide
- Number of employees: 700
- Divisions: Shiprepair, Conversion
- Website: www.odessos-yard.bg

Odessos Shiprepair Yard is situated at the southern end of the city of Varna, Bulgaria, on the island between the old and new canals connecting the Black Sea and the Lake of Varna and is about one mile far from the mouth of Port Varna. Spread over an area of about 320,000 square meters, Odessos is the largest well-equipped yard in Bulgaria suitable for repair and drydocking of vessels up to 35,000 DWT and afloat repairs of vessels up to 150,000 DWT. Odessos Shiprepair Yard is the most busiest yard in the Black Sea.

The total length of berths are 1 153,5 m with an average depth of 6,35 m. The depth of the port varies from 5,30 m to 9,80 m. Odessos Shiprepair Yard S.A. has 17 cranes. The graving dock is equipped with one 30 t crane, two 15 t cranes and one 10 t crane. Floating dock No. 2 is equipped with two 15 t cranes and floating dock No. 3 is equipped with two 20 t cranes. Also available is a 100 t floating crane.

== History ==
It is assumed that the date of birth of Odessos Shiprepair Yard, Varna, Bulgaria, is the day of 1 September 1955 when the Graving dock was commissioned at the Georgi Dimitrov shipbuilding and shiprepair yard. Some time after their foundation, the two main activities of the Georgi Dimitrov shipbuilding and shiprepair yard separated, so Odessos undertook the shiprepair services.

The construction of the Graving dock was related at that time with the necessity for execution of emergency dock repairs of war ships in case of eventual military operations in the Black Sea basin during the Cold War.

The first docked vessel was the Bulgarian M/V “Shipka”. This docking marked the commencement of service of the Graving dock.

== Key figures 2015 ==
- Annual Turnover: 25 Million Dollars
- Docked projects 2015: 60
- Employees: over 700

Annual repairs by type of vessel:

- General cargo:22
- Bulk carrier:13
- Oil/chemical tanker:5
- Refrigerated cargo:3
- Ro-ro cargo;3
- Vehicles carrier:3
- Passenger/ro-ro cargo/ferry:2
- Tanker:2
- Container ship:1
- Chemical tanker:1
- Oil/products tanker:1
- Product tanker:1
- Ro-ro passenger ship:1
- Supply vessel:1
- Cargo barge:1

Facilities

- Area: 320 000 sq. m
- Floating Docks: 2 (up to 75 000 DWT)
- Graving Dock: 1 (up to 35 000 GRT)
- Wharves & Berths: 1 153,5 m with depth up to 9,80 m
- Cranes: 17

Total docked projects 1955-2015: 4 940

== Certificates ==
- ISO 9001:2008 Ship repair and conversion
- AQAP 2120 Repair and docking of vessels up to 70 000 DWT and afloat repair of vessels up to 150 000 DWT
- OHSAS 18001:2007 Ship repair and conversion

Odessos Shiprepair Yard SA is certified by Class Societies for the following activities:

- Certified welders and approved WPS (EH36) for welding of ship's steel hull structures (LR и RINA);
- Certified welders and approved WPS for welding of ship's bronze propellers (LR и GL);
- Approval for welding of ship's hull structures and mechanical elements (GL, BRS); Survey and maintenance of ship's fire equipment (LR, GL, BV, BRS);
- Survey and maintenance of ship's life-boats and davits (LR);
- Thickness measurements of ship's hull structure (LR, GL, BV, DNV, BRS);

== Today ==
The yard has invested over 30 million US dollars in improvement of infrastructure, buildings, purchase of machinery, equipment and stations, improvement of workplace and safety. Commissioning of the Floating dock No. 3 with lifting capacity of 20 000 tons.
