= North Florida Shipyards =

Coordinates: 30.31849°N 81.63018°W

- Industry: Shipyard
- Founded: 1978
- Headquarters: Jacksonville, Florida, United States
- Area served: United States
- Website: www.northfloridashipyard.com

North Florida Shipyards, Inc. is a ship repair and conversion company, Founded in 1978. The company is situated in Jacksonville, Florida and includes two facilities – one located in the Commodores Point area of Jacksonville the other on Mayport Naval Station. The main focus of the company is ship repair and conversion. The shipyard works on tankers and cargo ships, passenger vessels, tugs, barges, offshore supply vessels and offshore yachts. The company has 3600 feet of bulk-headed wharf, 210,000 sq. ft. of warehouse and shops, and resides on approximately 25 acres of property.
