= Barkmeijer Shipyards =

Barkmeijer
- Founded: 1850
- Founder: Gerrit Jans Barkmeijer
- Defunct: 2018-10-30
- Headquarters: Gerkesklooster-Stroobos, Netherlands
- Number of employees: 150
- Website: www.barkmeijer.com

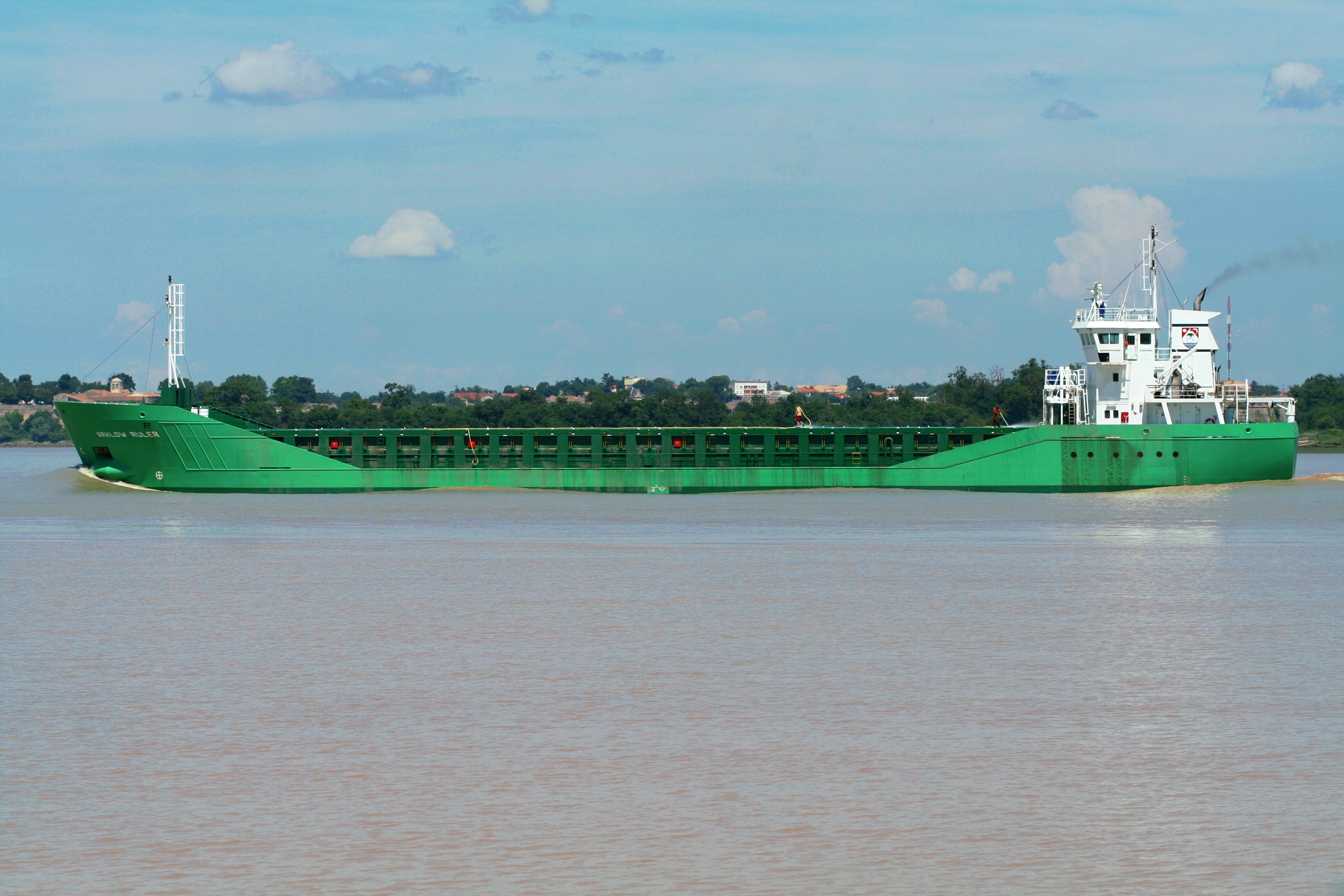
Arklow Ruler, a ship built by Barkmeijer

Barkmeijer Shipyards is a shipbuilder based in Stroobos in the Netherlands. Barkmeijer mostly builds dry cargo vessels, dredgers, and tankers and specialises in custom builds. In June 2010, Barkmeijer launched an 8300-ton coaster, Marietje Marsilla. In September 2010, Barkmeijer won a contract to build three large pilot vessels for the Dutch pilotage service.
