= Ada Shipyard =

Turkish shipyard

Coordinates: 40.8464°N 29.2922°E

Ada Shipyard (Turkish: Ada Tersanesi) is a Turkish shipyard established in Tuzla, Istanbul in 2008.

== See also ==
- List of shipbuilders and shipyards
