= Komandarm Fedko-class oiler =

Class of replenishment tankers

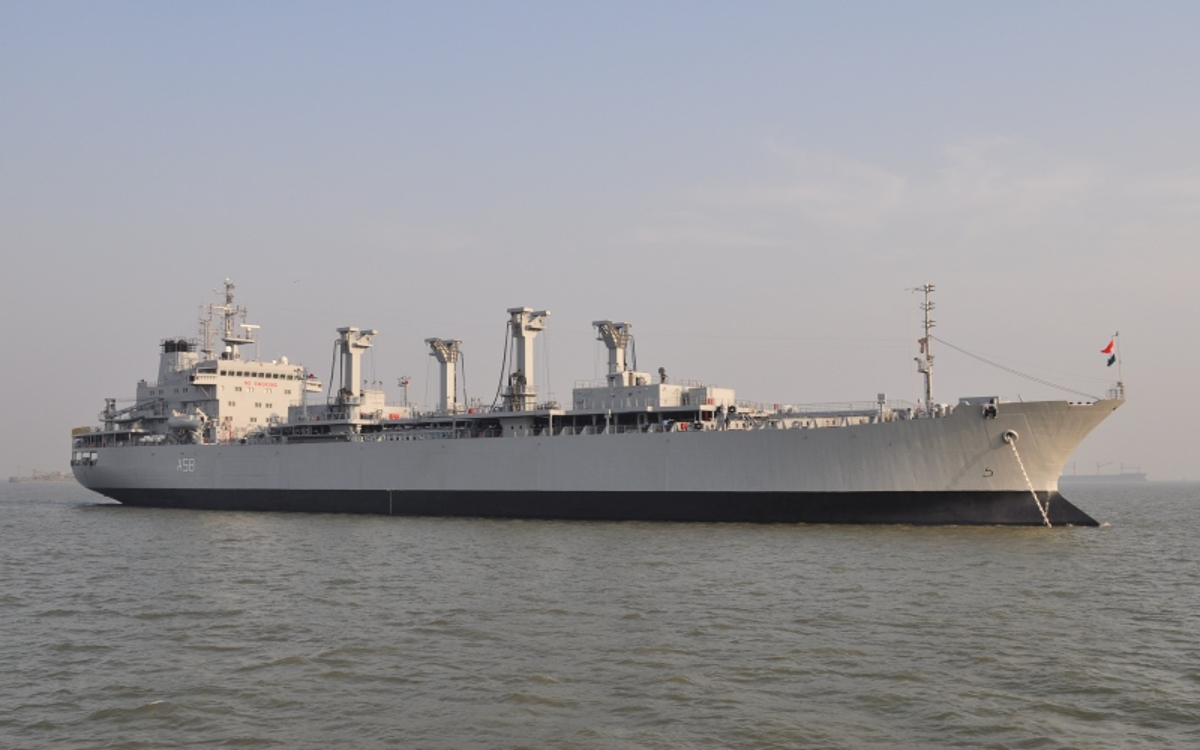
- INS Jyoti during Milan 2018 exercise

Class overview
- Operators: Indian Navy; People's Liberation Army Navy
- Active: 2

General characteristics
- Type: Replenishment tanker
- Displacement: 35,900 tons full load
- Length: 178 m (584 ft 0 in)
- Beam: 25 m (82 ft 0 in)
- Propulsion: One 8,164 kW (10,948 hp) 6DKRN60/195 diesel
- Speed: 15 knots (28 km/h; 17 mph)
- Range: 12,000 nmi (22,000 km; 14,000 mi) at 15 knots
- Complement: 92 (incl. 16 officers)
- Sensors & processing systems: 2 x Decca 1226 navigation radars
- Armament: Guns may be fitted
- Aircraft carried: 1 medium helicopter
- Notes: Cargo capacity: 25,040 tons diesel

The Komandarm Fedko class is a class of replenishment tankers operated by the Indian and Chinese navies. Four ships of the Komandarm Fedko class were constructed by the Soviet Union, later Russia, of which one was bought by India, one by China and two are in commercial service. INS Jyoti (meaning "light") is the third largest ship in the Indian Navy after the aircraft carriers INS Vikrant and INS Vikramaditya.

== History ==
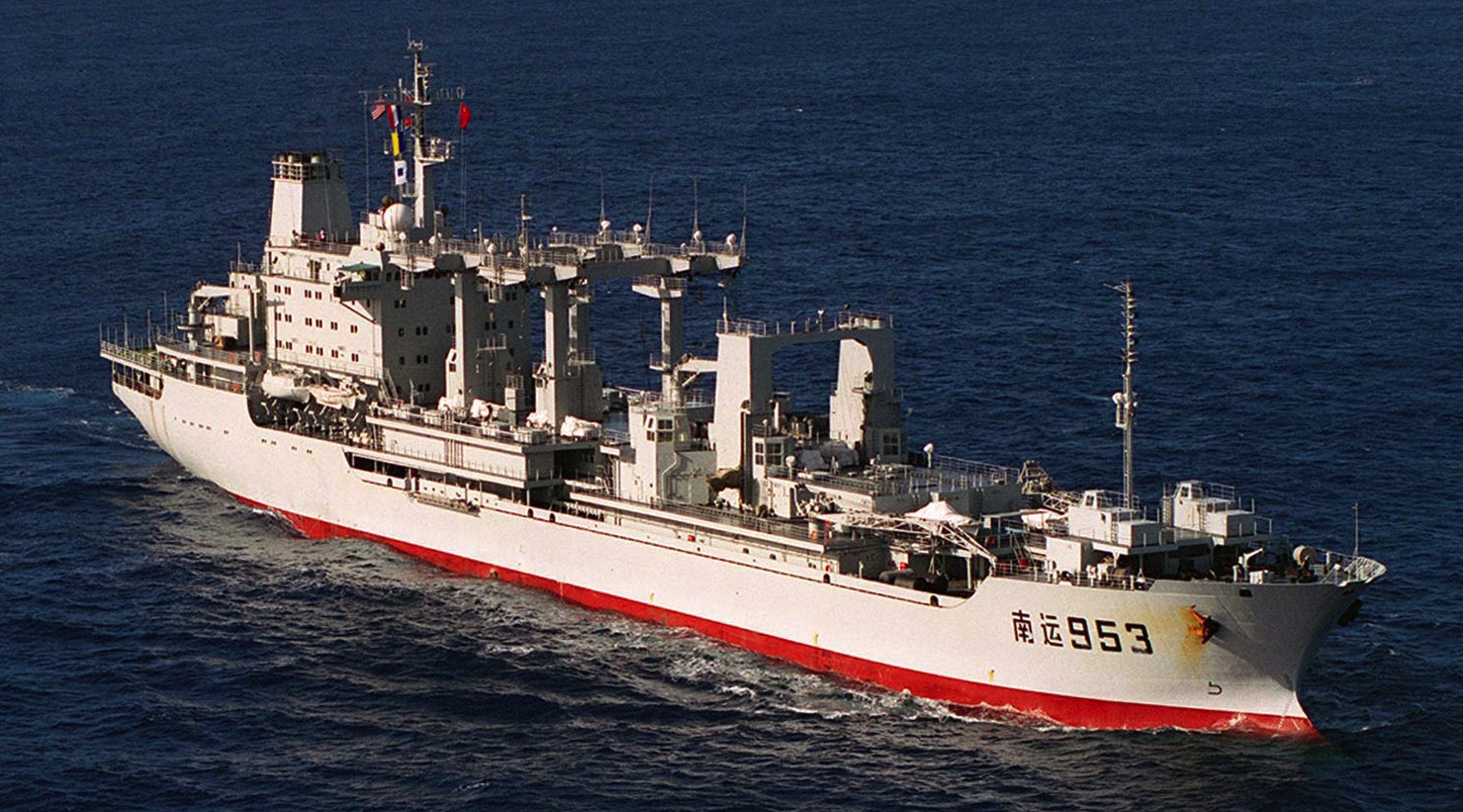
Chinese replenishment ship Qinghaihu in 1997

INS Jyoti was constructed by the Admiralty Shipyard of St. Petersburg, Russia. It was built to be a Project 15966M merchant tanker, but was modified and purchased by the Indian Navy, and commissioned on 20 July 1996. The ship was based at Bombay, where it arrived in November 2006. It is deployed as a major force multiplier in sustaining the navy's blue water operations. It can increase the range of a naval task force without tanker support from seven days and 2,400 nautical miles (4,400 km; 2,800 mi) to 50 days and 16,800 nautical miles (31,100 km; 19,300 mi). INS Jyoti visited Shanghai in 2003, and participated in exercises by the Indian and Singapore navies in 2010.

Qinghaihu was laid down in January 1989 at the Kherson Shipyard as Vladimir Peregudov. In 1992, China bought the incomplete ship from Ukraine for $10 million. The ship sailed nearly complete to Dalian, China in 1993, and completed by the Dalian Shipbuilding Industry Company. She was commissioned into the PLAN on 5 August 1996 and assigned to the South Sea Fleet as Qinghaihu.

== Ships of the class ==
Name	Pennant	Builder	Homeport	Commissioned	Status
INS Jyoti	A58	Admiralty Shipyard, St. Petersburg	Karwar	20 July 1996	Active
Qinghaihu	AO 885	Kherson Shipyard, Kherson	Sanya	5 August 1996	Active

== See also ==
- Deepak-class fleet tanker
- Aditya-class auxiliary ship
- HSL-class fleet support ship
