= Type 905 replenishment oiler =

Chinese replenishment oiler ship

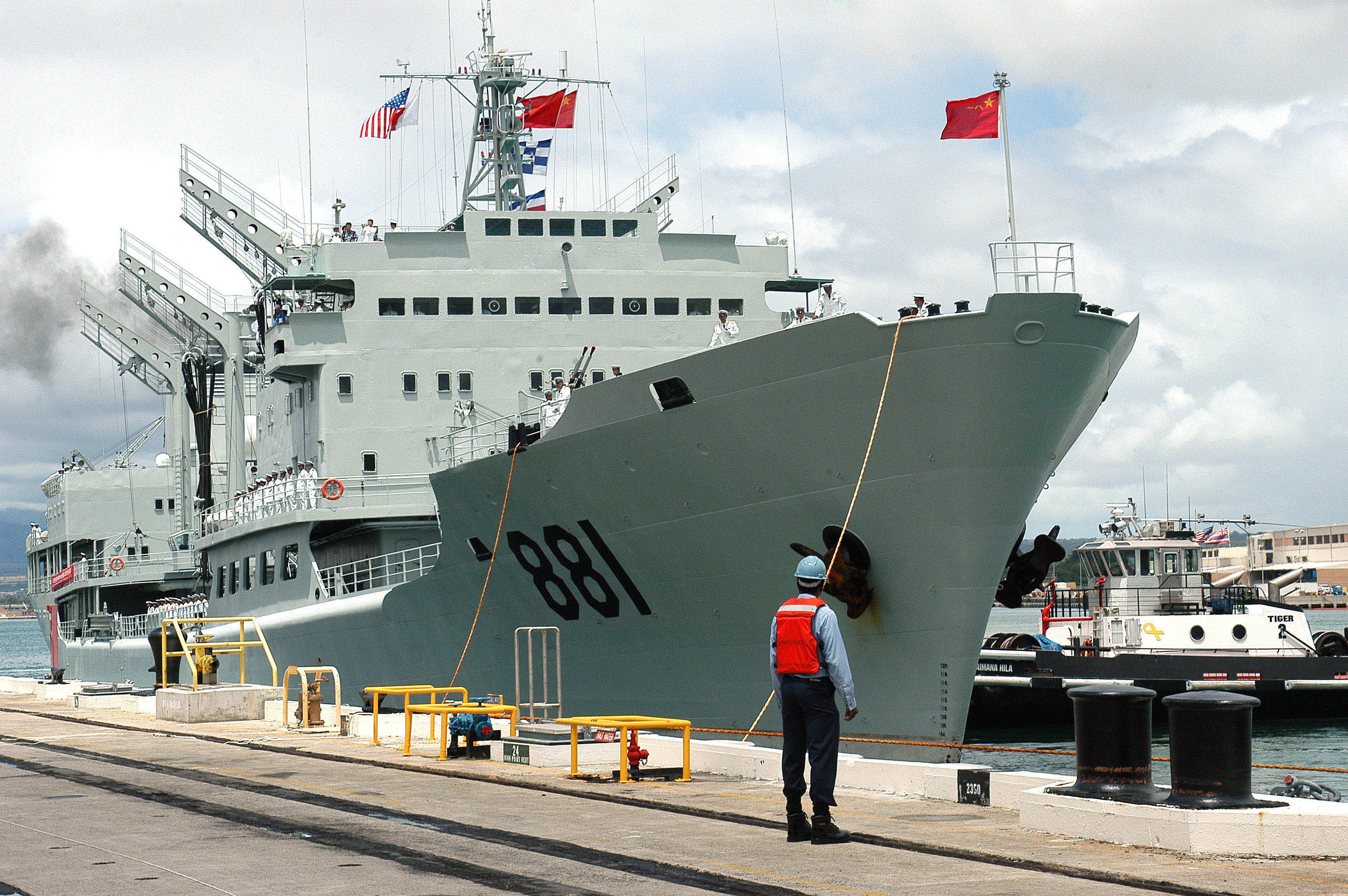
- Hongzehu at Pearl Harbor in 2006.

Class overview
- Builders: Dalian Shipbuilding Industry Company
- Operators: People's Liberation Army Navy; Pakistan Navy
- Succeeded by: Type 908 replenishment ship
- In commission: 1980–present
- Completed: 4
- Active: 2
- Retired: 2

General characteristics
- Type: Replenishment oiler
- Displacement: 22,099 tons (full load)
- Length: 168.2 metres (552 ft)
- Beam: 21.8 metres (72 ft)
- Draught: 9.4 metres (31 ft)
- Propulsion: 1 x Sulzer 8RL B66 diesel engine; 1 shaft; Total output: 15,000 hp (11,000 kW)
- Speed: 18 knots (33 km/h; 21 mph)
- Range: 18,000 nautical miles (33,000 km; 21,000 mi) at 14 knots (26 km/h; 16 mph)
- Capacity: 10,550 tons of fuel oil, 1000 tons of diesel, 200 tons of feed water, 200 tons of drinking water
- Complement: 130
- Sensors & processing systems: Fin Curve navigation radar; or; Racal-Decca 1290 navigation radar
- Aircraft carried: 1 medium helicopter
- Aviation facilities: flight deck

The Type 905 (NATO reporting name: Fuqing) is a class of replenishment oiler (AOR) built for the People's Liberation Army Navy (PLAN) by the People's Republic of China (PRC). They were the first ships built to perform underway replenishment in the PLAN.

Four Type 905s were built. The three PLAN ships began entering service by the early 1980s. One was transferred to the Chinese merchant navy in 1989. The remainder were likely decommissioned by 2020. The fourth ship entered service with the Pakistan Navy in 1987.

== Design ==
The Type 905 has three replenishment positions on each side; the forward two are for liquids, and the rear is for solids.

== Ships of the class ==
Name	Hull No.	Builder	Launched	Commissioned	Formation	Status	Notes
People's Liberation Army Navy
Hongzehu	881	Dalian Shipbuilding Industry Company			East Sea Fleet	Retired	Formerly Taicang, Beiyu (575)
Poyanghu	887	Dalian Shipbuilding Industry Company			North Sea Fleet	Retired	Formerly Dongyun (615)
Pakistan Navy
Nasr	A47	Dalian Shipbuilding Industry Company	14 March 1987	1 August 1987	9th Auxiliary and Mine Warfare Squadron	Active	
Chinese merchant navy
Hai Lang		Dalian Shipbuilding Industry Company				Active	Formerly Hongcang (950) of the PLAN

== Sources ==
- Saunders, Stephan, ed. (2015). Jane's Fighting Ships 2015-2016. Jane's Information Group. ISBN 978-0710631435.
- Wertheim, Eric (2013). The Naval Institute Guide to Combat Fleets of the World: Their Ships, Aircraft, and Systems (16 ed.). Annapolis, Maryland: Naval Institute Press. ISBN 978-1591149545.
