= Deepak-class fleet tanker =

Indian Navy ship

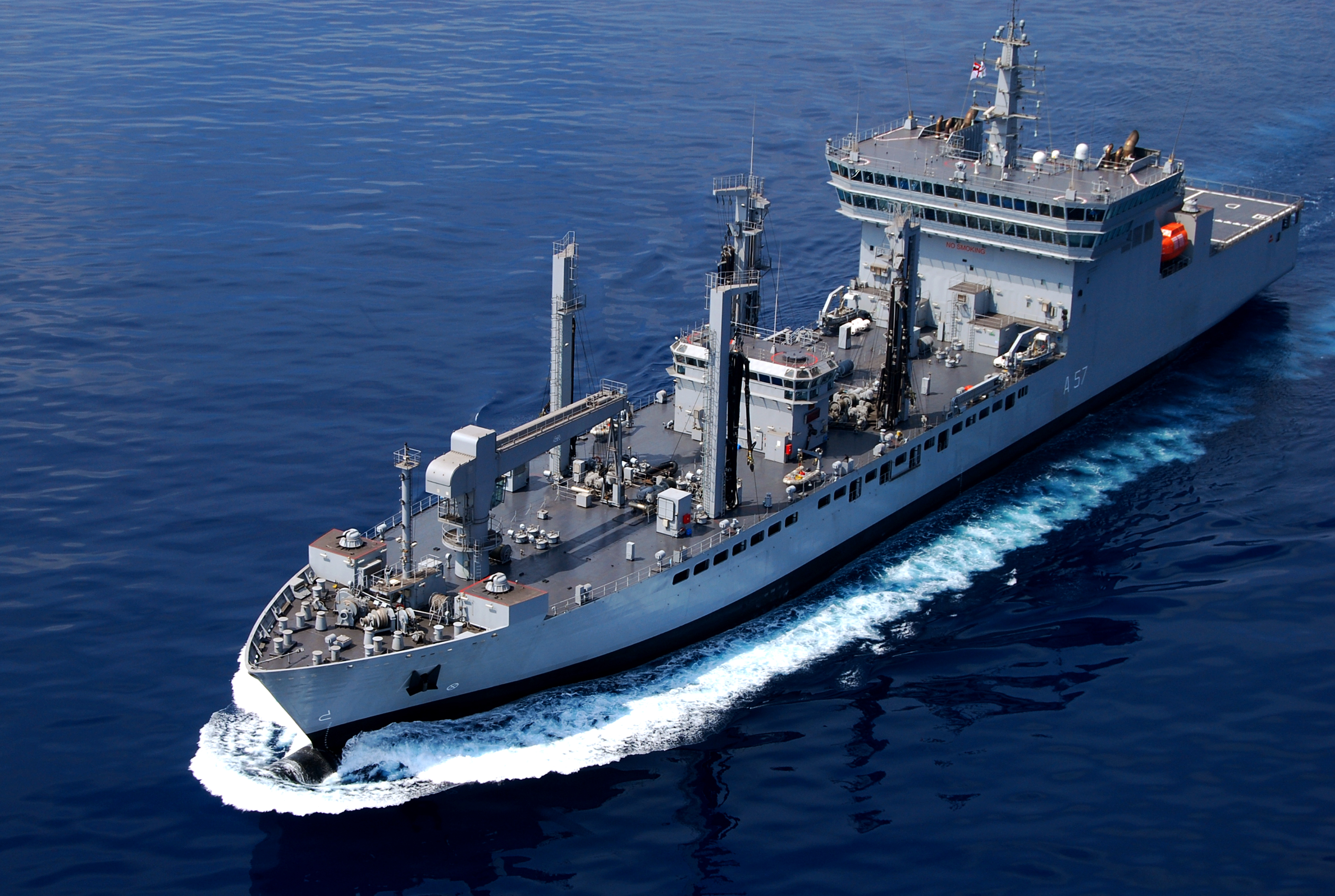
- INS Shakti en-route to Qingdao, China.

Class overview
- Builders: Fincantieri
- Operators: Indian Navy
- Preceded by: Aditya class
- Succeeded by: Surya class
- In commission: 2011–present
- Planned: 2
- Completed: 2
- Active: 2

General characteristics
- Type: Replenishment fleet tanker
- Displacement: 27,500 tons full load
- Length: 175 m (574 ft 2 in)
- Beam: 25 m (82 ft 0 in)
- Draught: 9.1 m (29 ft 10 in)
- Propulsion: 10,000 kW (13,000 hp) diesel engine
- Speed: 20 knots (37 km/h; 23 mph)
- Range: 12,000 nmi (22,000 km; 14,000 mi) at 15 knots (28 km/h; 17 mph)
- Complement: 248
- Armament: 4 × AK-630
- Aircraft carried: Sea King or HAL Chetak
- Aviation facilities: Flight deck for helicopter operations

The Deepak class is a class of fleet replenishment tankers of the Indian Navy built by Fincantieri. Two ships were ordered and the first one joined the fleet on 21 January 2011, while the second joined on 1 October 2011.

== History ==
INS Deepak's construction programme by Muggiano Shipyard of Fincantieri, involved three different shipyards of Fincantieri, in a challenging time frame of two years. The ship is double hulled which provides greater safety against oil spillages in accordance with latest MARPOL regulations.

=== Costs and offset clause ===
Fincantieri announced in October 2008 that it won an order to build a fleet tanker, with an option for another, against competitive bidding from leading international players, especially from Russia and Korea. The contract, worth about 139 million euros includes a second vessel under an option clause which was signed in March 2009. According to an interview published in Defenseworld.net in May 2009, senior BEL executives stated that as part of the offsets for the first fleet tanker, Fincantieri, in 2008, placed an order worth 14.3 million euros for the supply of Composite Communication System, Versatile Communication System, ESM System, Electric Opto Fire Control System and their integration on board the fleet tanker. Bharat Electronics (BEL) will implement this order in 2009.

== Ships of the class ==
Name	Pennant	Homeport	Launched	Commissioned
INS Deepak	A50	Karwar	12 February 2010	21 January 2011
INS Shakti	A57	Visakhapatnam	11 October 2010	1 October 2011

On 12 February 2010, the first ship of the class INS Deepak was launched. The CAG (Comptroller and Auditor General) reported that substandard steel was chosen which helped Fincantieri to bag the contract quoting lower cost. On 21 January 2011, Deepak was commissioned in a ceremony at the Naval Dockyard, Mumbai by the Defence Minister of India.

INS Shakti is the second Deepak-class fleet tanker. The vessel was launched on 11 October 2010 and commissioned on 1 October 2011.

== Gallery ==
Images of Deepak-class ships at sea
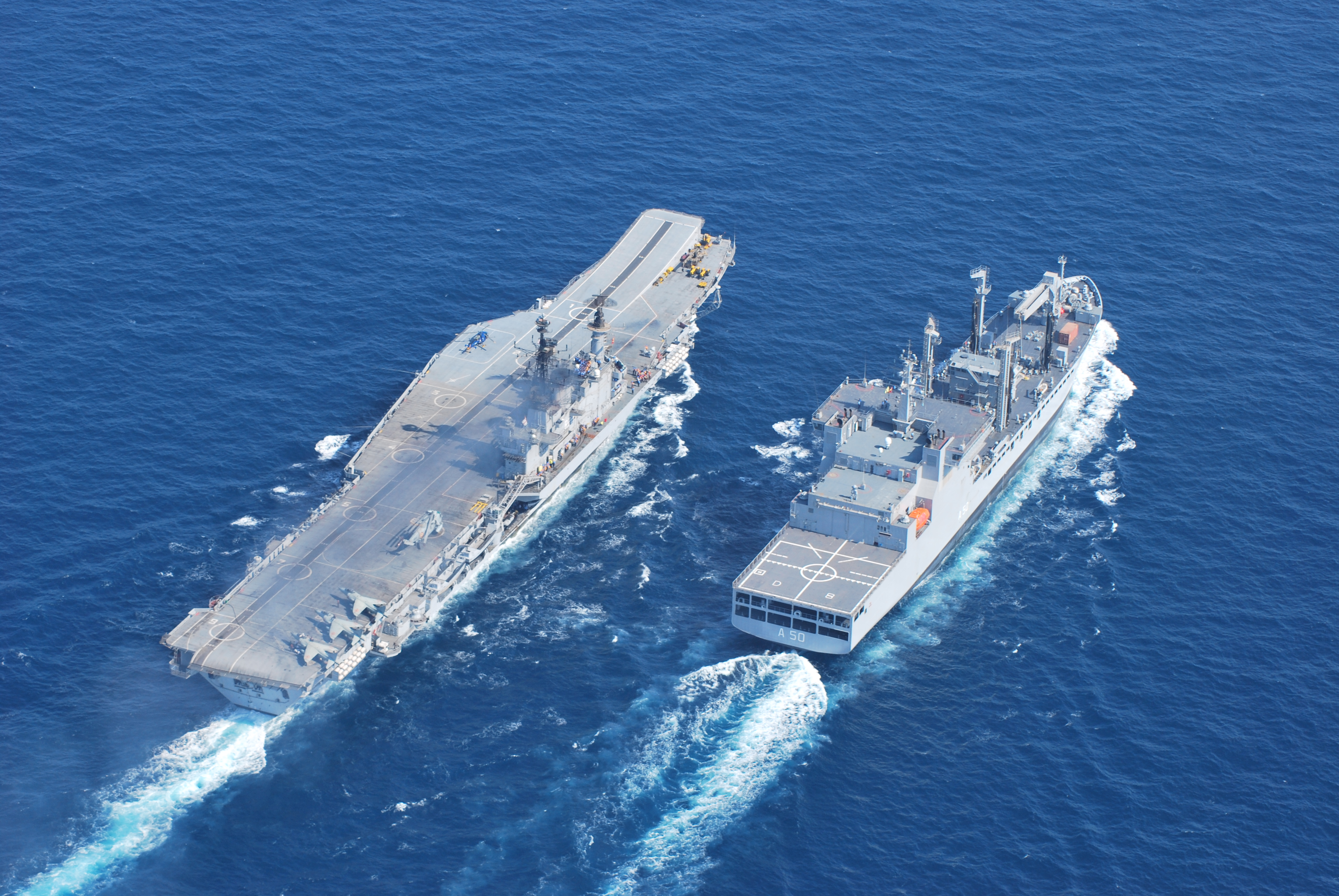
INS Viraat approaches the fleet tanker INS Deepak for replenishment at sea.

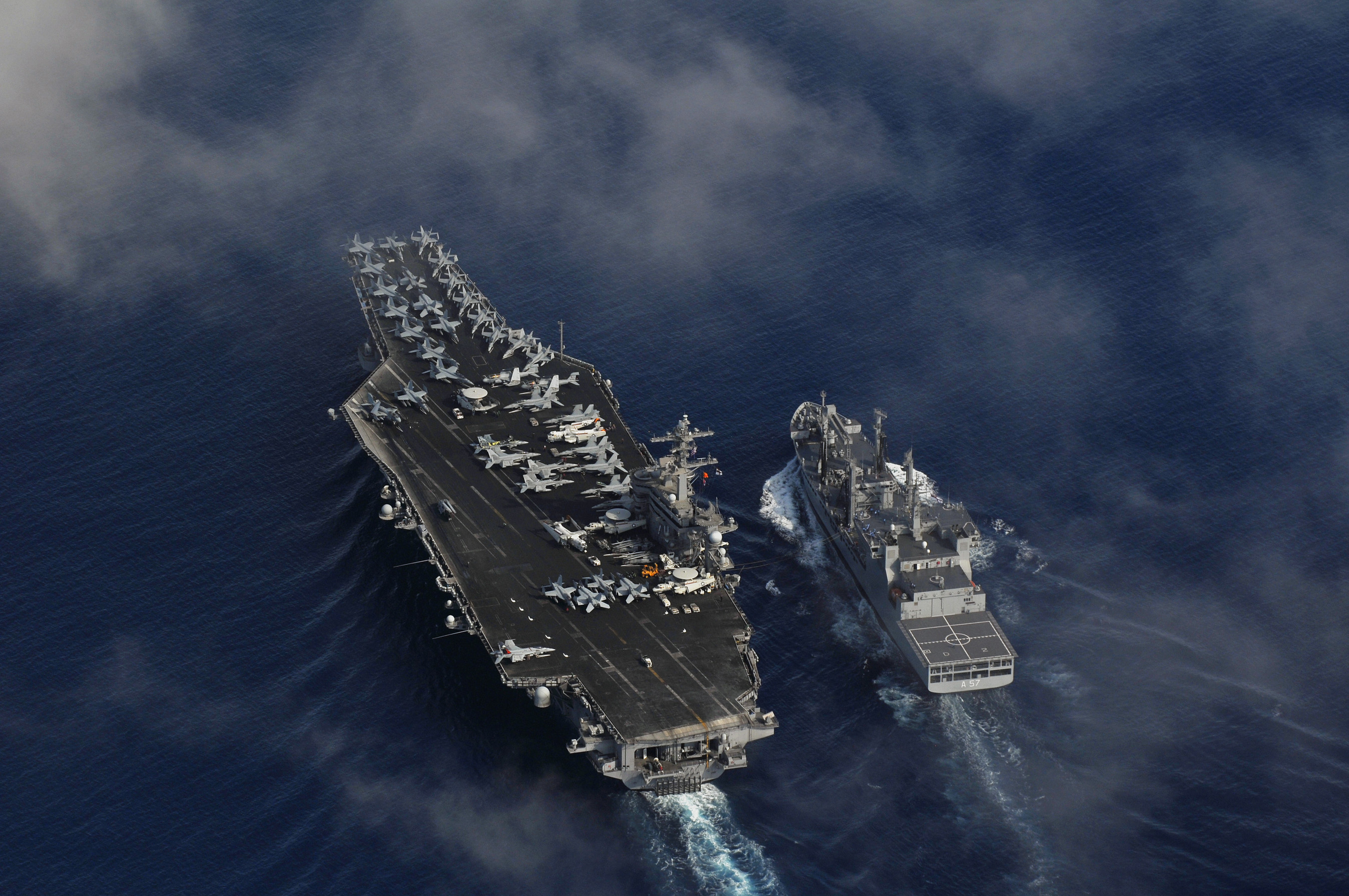
The Nimitz-class aircraft carrier USS Carl Vinson and the Indian Navy replenishment oiler INS Shakti conduct a refueling-at-sea exercise

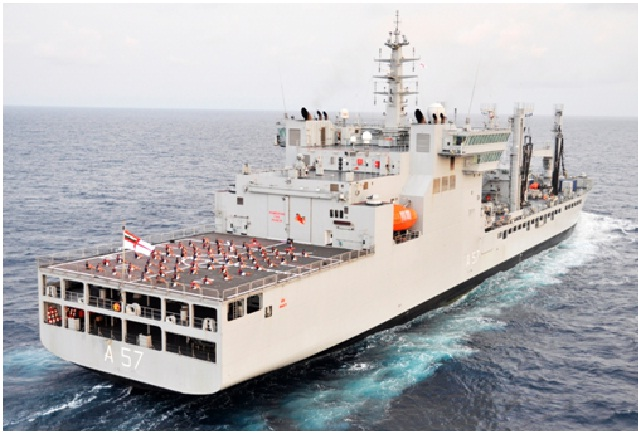
Yoga onboard Shakti

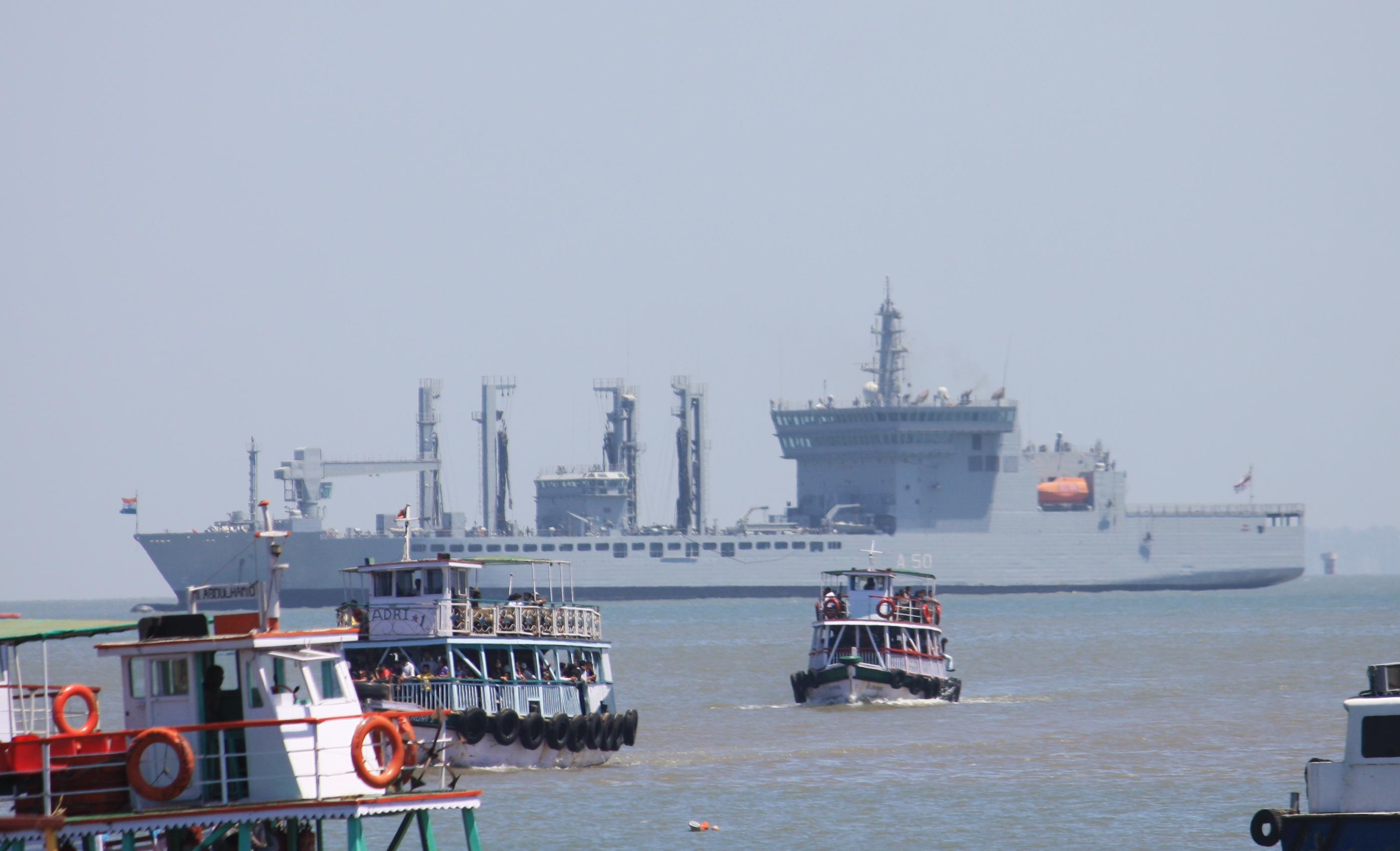
Deepak near the Mumbai coast.

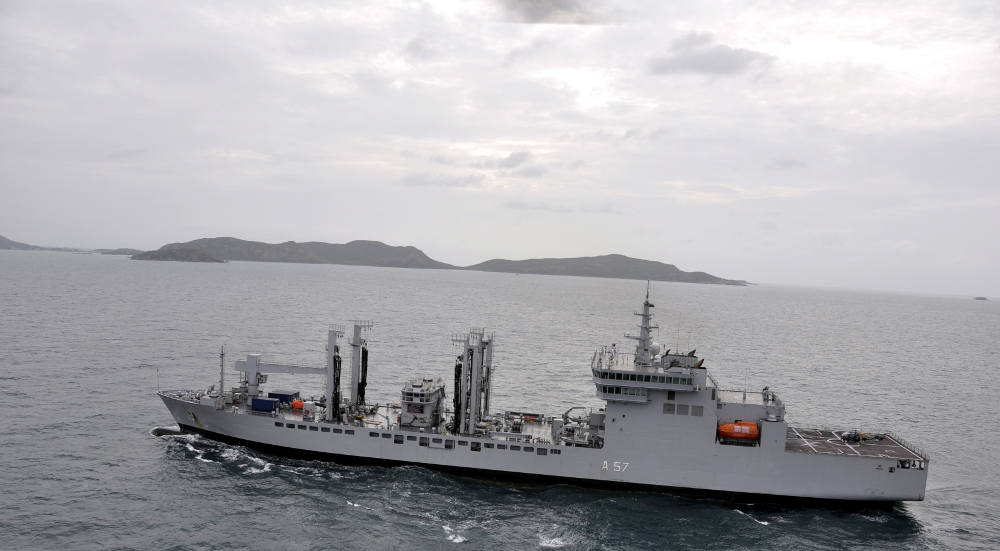
Shakti entering Sattahip, Thailand

== See also ==
- Aditya-class auxiliary ship
- Komandarm Fedko-class oiler
- HSL-class fleet support ship
