= PNS Nasr =

Pakistani navy oiler

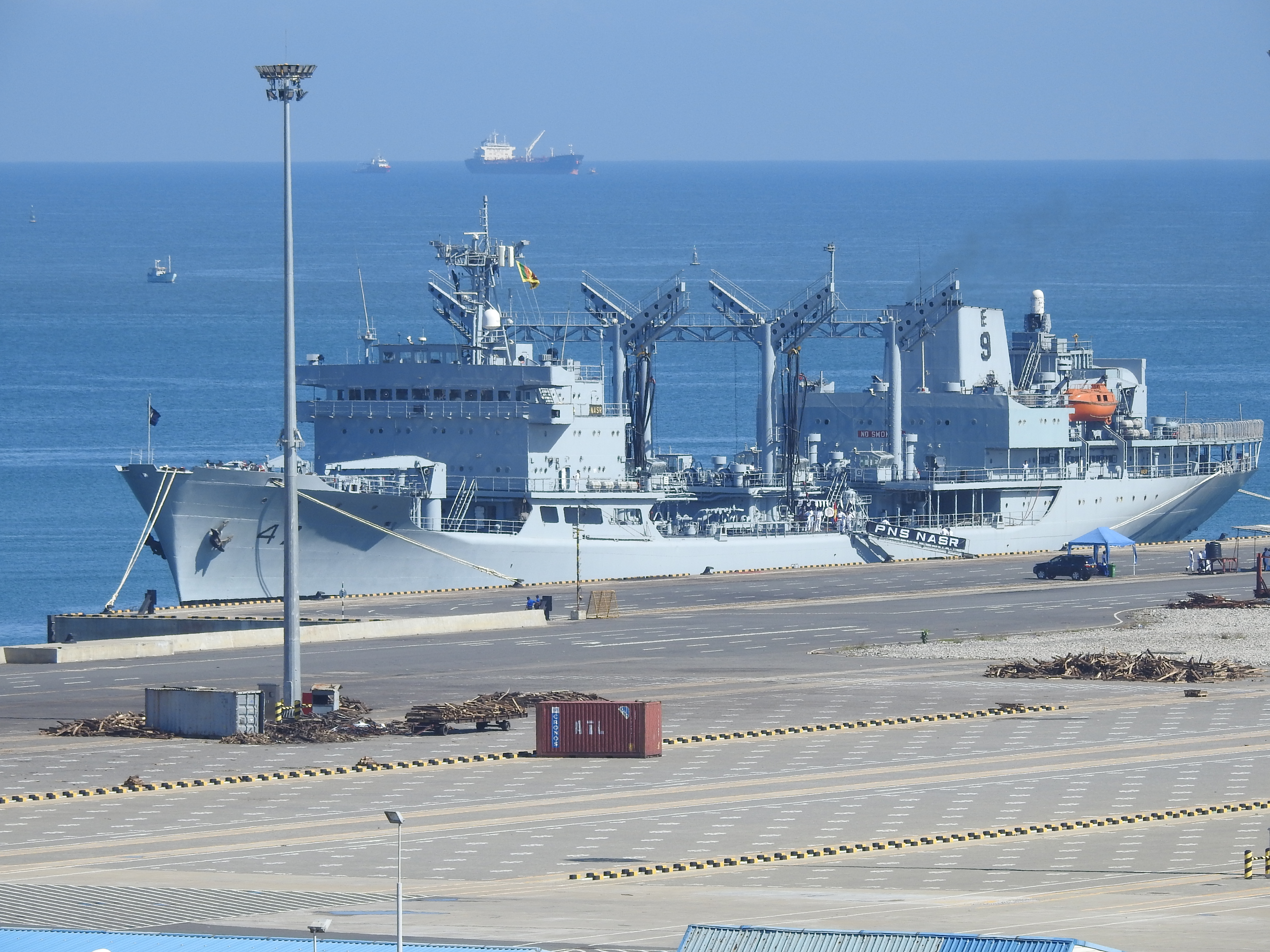
- PNS Nasr (A47) in Colombo Harbour in Sri Lanka in 2017.

History

Pakistan
- Name: Nasr
- Builder: Dalian Shipbuilding Industry Company
- Launched: 14 March 1986
- Acquired: 1986
- Commissioned: 1 August 1987
- In service: 26 August 1987
- Home port: Karachi Naval Dockyard
- Identification: A47
- Status: in active service

General characteristics
- Class & type: Type 905 replenishment oiler
- Displacement: 22,099 tons (full load)
- Length: 171 metres (561 ft)
- Beam: 21.8 metres (72 ft)
- Draught: 9.4 metres (31 ft)
- Propulsion: 1 × Sulzer 8RL B66 diesel engine; 1 shaft; Total output: 13,000 hp (9,700 kW)
- Speed: 18 knots (33 km/h; 21 mph)
- Range: 18,000 nautical miles (33,000 km; 21,000 mi) at 14 knots (26 km/h; 16 mph)
- Capacity: 10,550 tons of fuel oil, 1000 tons of diesel, 200 tons of feed water, 200 tons of drinking water
- Complement: 26 officers; 120 enlisted
- Sensors & processing systems: 1 × Kelvin Hughes 1007 navigation radar; 1 × SPS-66 radar navigation radar
- Electronic warfare & decoys: Thales DR 3000 ESM; SRBOC Mk 36 chaff launcher; 2 × Rheinmetall MASS launchers
- Armament: 1 × Phalanx CIWS; 2 × twin 37mm guns; 2 × 12.7mm machine guns
- Aircraft carried: 1 × Aérospatiale Alouette III; or; 1 × Westland Sea King
- Aviation facilities: flight deck and hangar

PNS Nasr (A47) is a Type 905 replenishment oiler of the Pakistan Navy. The oiler was constructed in the People's Republic of China by the Dalian Shipbuilding Industry Company and entered service in 1987.

== History ==
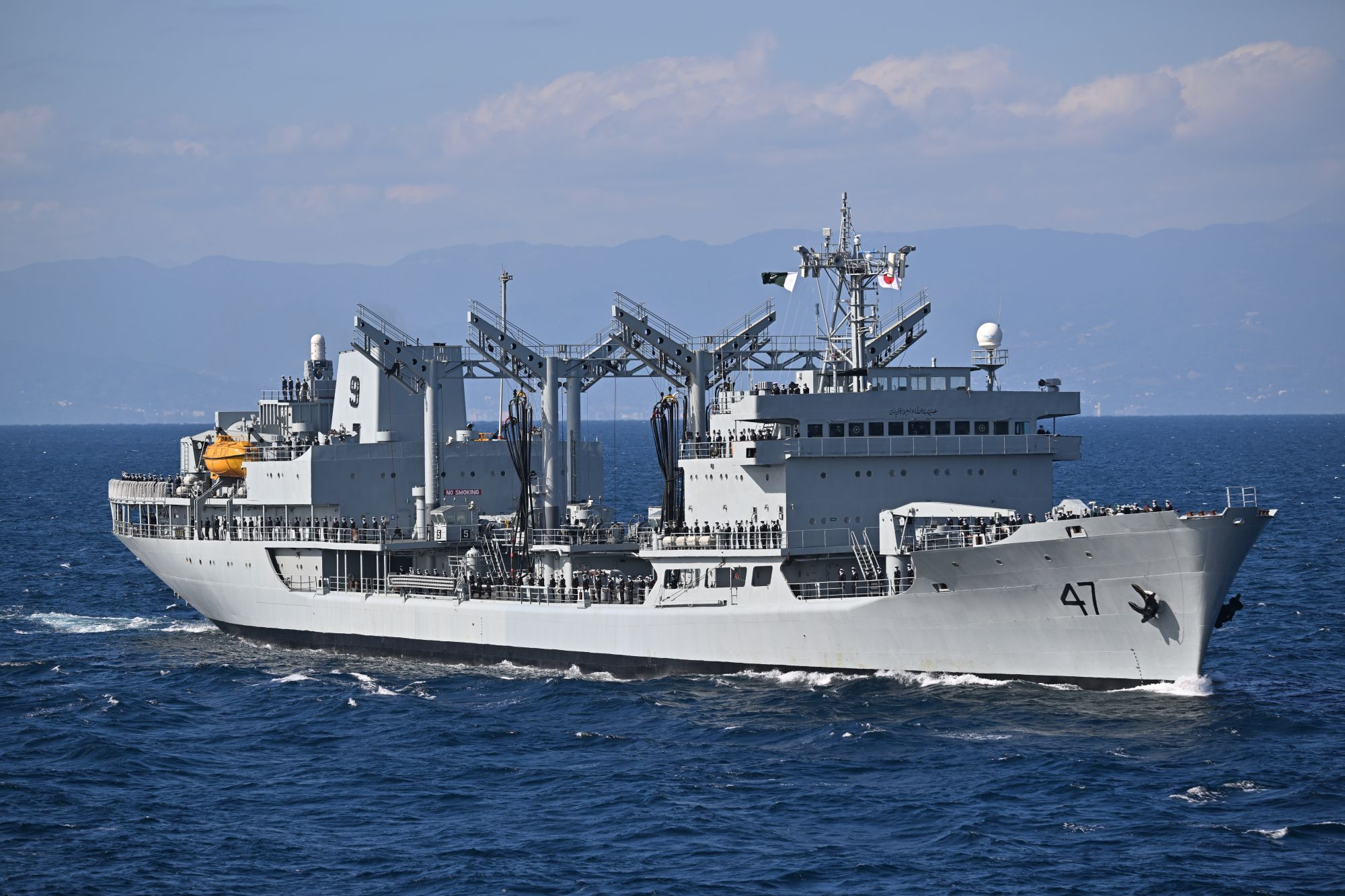
PNS Nasr (A47) participating in the International Fleet Review 2022.

Nasr was ordered by Pakistan in late-1986 and completed to Pakistani requirements. She entered service in 1987.

A Phalanx CIWS was installed in 1995; it may have come from the retired County-class destroyer PNS Babur.

On 21 October 1998, the oiler suffered minor damage from being rammed by the commercial tanker Sun Marsat at Karachi.

In April 2003, Nasr and PNS Babur deployed to the Port of Chittagong in Bangladesh to support the Bangladeshi Navy. In 2006, she visited Langkawi in Malaysia before reporting back her homeport.

She provided relief to the Maldives after the 2004 Indian Ocean earthquake and tsunami, and was the first foreign contingent to start rescue operations there.

Nasr participated in the 2014 Kakadu military exercise in Australia. A crewman deserted on September 7 at around 04:30 while the ship was docked at Darwin; he was found on September 8.

In 2017, Nasr paid a goodwill visit, along with PNS Khaibar, to Sri Lanka, harbouring at the Port of Colombo to support the activities of Sri Lankan Navy.

In 2018, Nasr and Khaibar, under the command of Commodore Javaid Iqbal, paid a goodwill visit to Tanzania, Mauritius, and Kenya to support their navies activities.

In 2021, Nasr under the command of Capt Misbah ul Amin TI(M) conducted a disaster relief mission in Africa, sailing to Port Sudan, Djibouti, and Cotonou, and delivering 1,000 tonnes of rice as humanitarian aid from Pakistan to Djibouti, Sudan, Benin and Niger. It also conducted a goodwill visit to Mombasa, Kenya.

== See also ==
- China–Pakistan relations
  - China–Pakistan military relations

== Sources ==
- Saunders, Stephan, ed. (2015). Jane's Fighting Ships 2015-2016. Jane's Information Group. ISBN 978-0710631435.
- Wertheim, Eric (2013). The Naval Institute Guide to Combat Fleets of the World: Their Ships, Aircraft, and Systems (16 ed.). Annapolis, Maryland: Naval Institute Press. ISBN 978-1591149545.
