= Chinese replenishment ship Qinghaihu =

Replenishment oiler of the People's Liberation Army Navy

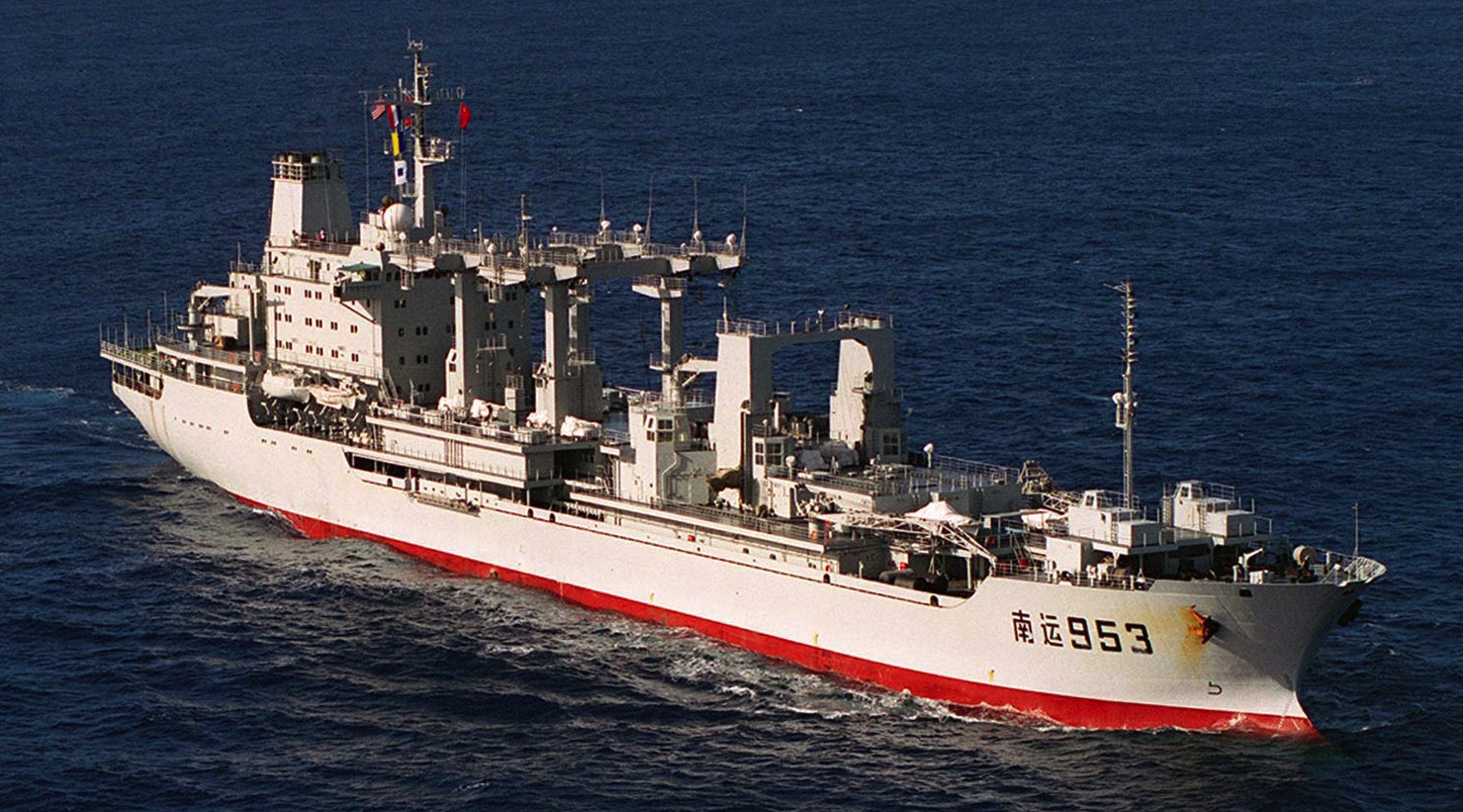

Class overview
- Builders: Kherson Shipyard; Dalian Shipbuilding Industry Company
- Operators: People's Liberation Army Navy
- Preceded by: Type 905 replenishment oiler
- Succeeded by: Type 903 replenishment ship
- In commission: 1996-present

History

People's Republic of China
- Name: Qinghaihu
- Namesake: Qinghai Lake
- Laid down: January 1989
- Launched: April 1992
- Commissioned: 2 June 1996
- Identification: Hull number: 885
- Status: Active

General characteristics
- Class & type: Komandarm Fedko-class oiler
- Displacement: 37,594 tons (full load)
- Length: 178.9 metres (587 ft)
- Beam: 25.3 metres (83 ft)
- Draught: 11 metres (36 ft)
- Propulsion: 1 x Bryansk-Burmeister & Wain 6DKRN74/160-3 diesel engine; 1 shaft; Total output: 10,600 bhp (7,900 kW)
- Speed: 16.4 knots (30.4 km/h; 18.9 mph)
- Range: 18,000 nautical miles (33,000 km; 21,000 mi) at 14.6 knots (27.0 km/h; 16.8 mph)
- Capacity: 9630 tons of fuel oil
- Complement: 125
- Aircraft carried: 1 x Harbin Z-8
- Aviation facilities: Hangar and flight deck

Qinghaihu is a Komandarm Fedko-class replenishment oiler of the People's Liberation Army Navy (PLAN). Ukraine sold the incomplete ship in 1992 to the People's Republic of China, where it was completed and commissioned in 1996.

In Chinese service, the ship was previously known as Nancang (953). The ship's class has the NATO reporting name Fusu.

== Design ==
The ship was designed by Central Design Bureau 'IZUMRUD' (Director E.Bridan) to the order of Soviet Navy (Customer No. 90) and her main function had been supposed to replenish the Navy's aircraft carriers at sea. The project was assigned a number 15990 and Chief Designer group consisted of I.Bagnenko (Lead designer), G.Starostin, A.Arkhipov (later dismissed), G.Stryapchev. A prototype was chosen - it was US Navy's 'Henry Kaiser'. Taking in account a delivery tight schedule the hull was taken as it is and it was based on the project 1596 product tanker (Lead designer V.Berdnikov), the first one (Shipyard's job order 1901) was delivered and named as 'Comandarm Fedko' to Customers (Georgian Shipping Company) on 31.12.1976. The design work was begun in the second part of the 1980th and the working drawings were handed over to the Kherson Shipyard which assigned to the ship its job order 3801. When the ship construction had begun at the shipyard a group of technical supervision and support was founded (Managers A.Arkhipov and G.Stryapchev). The ship was ready technically up to 78%, was launched, painted, everything (machinery, equipment, piping, cables etc) was installed. The quality of hull welding was first-class. The superstructure is modified with a deckhouse forward of the bridge and a working area built over the fuel cargo tanks. The stern is sponsoned for the helicopter pad; a small hangar is also installed.

There are four fuel and two solid store transfer stations. Refueling may be conducted from the stern.

== History ==
The ship was laid down in January 1989 by the Soviet Union at the Kherson Shipyard as Vladimir Peregudov. The Kherson shipyard designated her as hull no 3801 and Chief builder was M. Cukolenko. Actually, she never been named as 'Vladimir Peregudov', because at the time the Customer (No.90) abandoned the order and refused to finance her construction. In 1992, China bought the incomplete ship from Ukraine for $10 million (the exact price was undiscovered, and it consisted of a mix of partly bank transfers and goods barter) and According to Zhang Gang, chief designer of the replenishment oiler HTMS Similan, the purchase was made after the Chinese effort to design a new replenishment ship - ultimately the Type 903 replenishment ship - was delayed due to cost; the PLAN requirement was for one large replenishment per fleet, and it only had two Type 905 replenishment oilers.. The Design Bureau 'IZUMRUD' developed a special project to equip the ship accordingly to the Rules for get ready for long towing to China. The ship was sold under the name '3801' and all necessary delivery documentation had the designation. The sale and purchase contract had a clause that all working drawings to be delivered with the ship and a group of Ukrainian designers had to be sent to Dalian to participate in the ship construction.

The ship sailed nearly complete to Dalian, China in 1993, and completed by the Dalian Shipbuilding Industry Company. She was commissioned into the PLAN in 1996 and assigned to the South Sea Fleet.

== See also ==
- INS Jyoti (A58), a Komandarm Fedko bought by India

== Sources ==
- Saunders, Stephan, ed. (2015). Jane's Fighting Ships 2015-2016. Jane's Information Group. ISBN 978-0710631435.
- Sheldon-Duplaix, Alexandre (2017). "China's Auxiliary Fleet: Supporting a Blue-Water Navy in the Far Seas?". China's Evolving Surface Fleet. CSMI Red Book. Vol. 14. United States Naval War College. ISBN 978-1-935352-45-7.
- Wertheim, Eric (2013). The Naval Institute Guide to Combat Fleets of the World: Their Ships, Aircraft, and Systems (16 ed.). Annapolis, Maryland: Naval Institute Press. ISBN 978-1591149545.
