= Deepak-class oiler =

Tankers of the Indian Navy

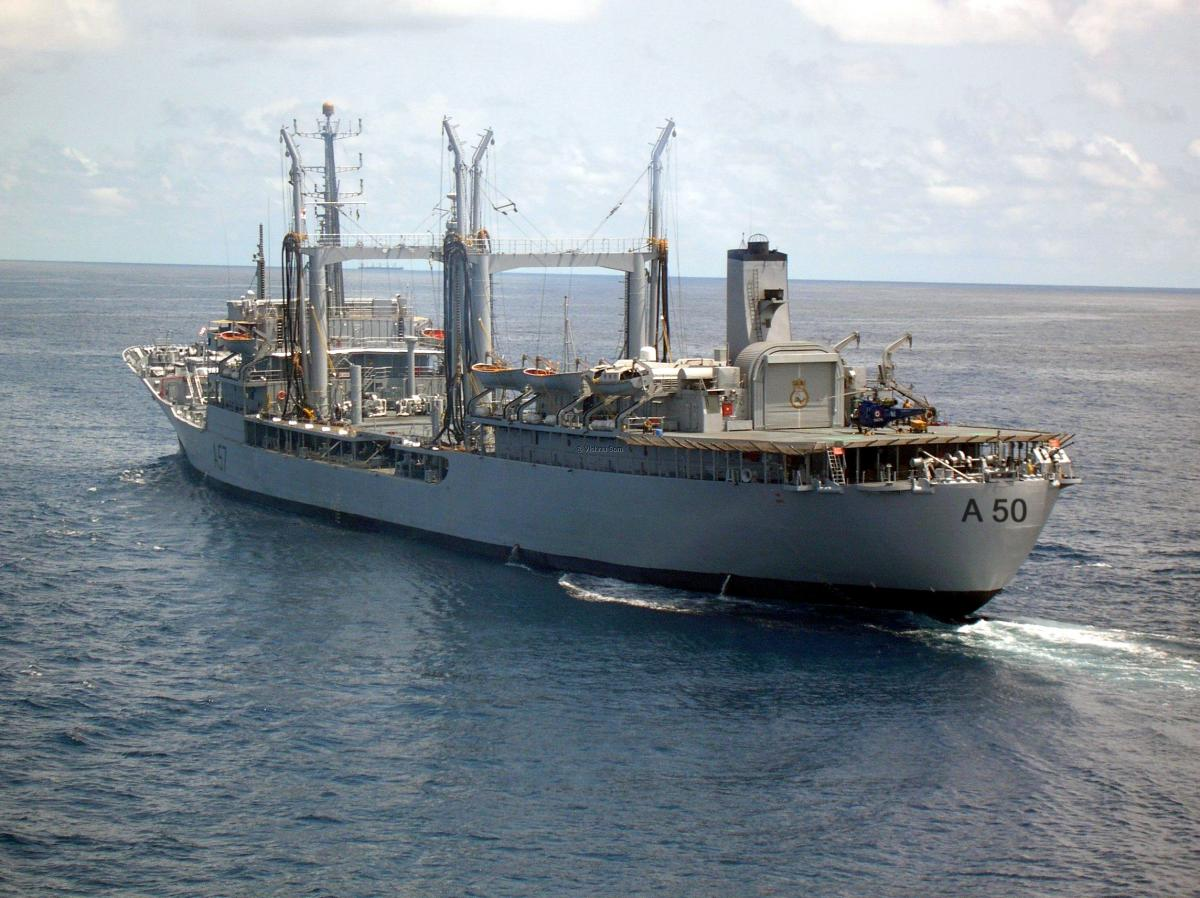
- INS Deepak (A50), the lead ship of her class of tankers of the Indian Navy

Class overview
- Name: Deepak class
- Operators: Indian Navy
- Succeeded by: Aditya class
- Planned: 2
- Completed: 2
- Retired: 2

General characteristics
- Type: Tanker
- Displacement: 15,000 tons
- Length: 168 m (551 ft)
- Beam: 23 m (75 ft)
- Speed: 18.5 knots (34.3 km/h; 21.3 mph)
- Complement: 169

The Deepak-class tankers of the Indian Navy were fleet replenishment ships.

== Ships of the class ==
Name	Pennant	Builder	Commissioned	Status
INS Deepak	A50		20 November 1967	Decommissioned on 30 April 1996
INS Shakti	A57		31 December 1975	Decommissioned on 21 July 2007

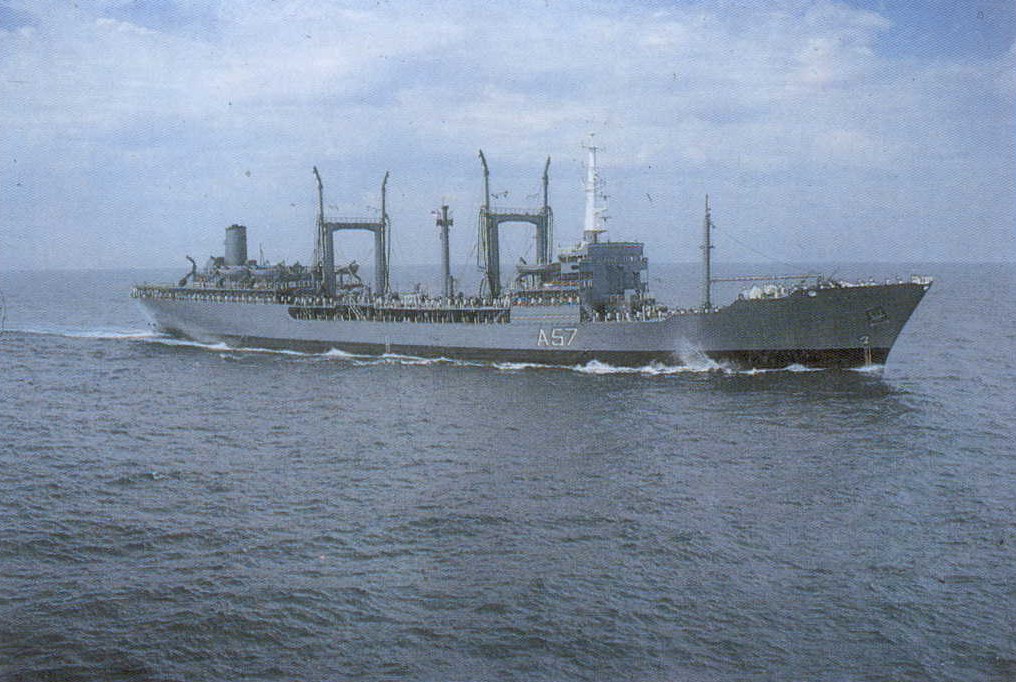
INS Shakti (A57)

== See also ==
- Operation Sukoon
