= Hindustan Shipyard =

Shipyard in Visakhapatnam, Andhra Pradesh, India

Coordinates: 17°41′24″N 83°16′39″E

Hindustan Shipyard Limited

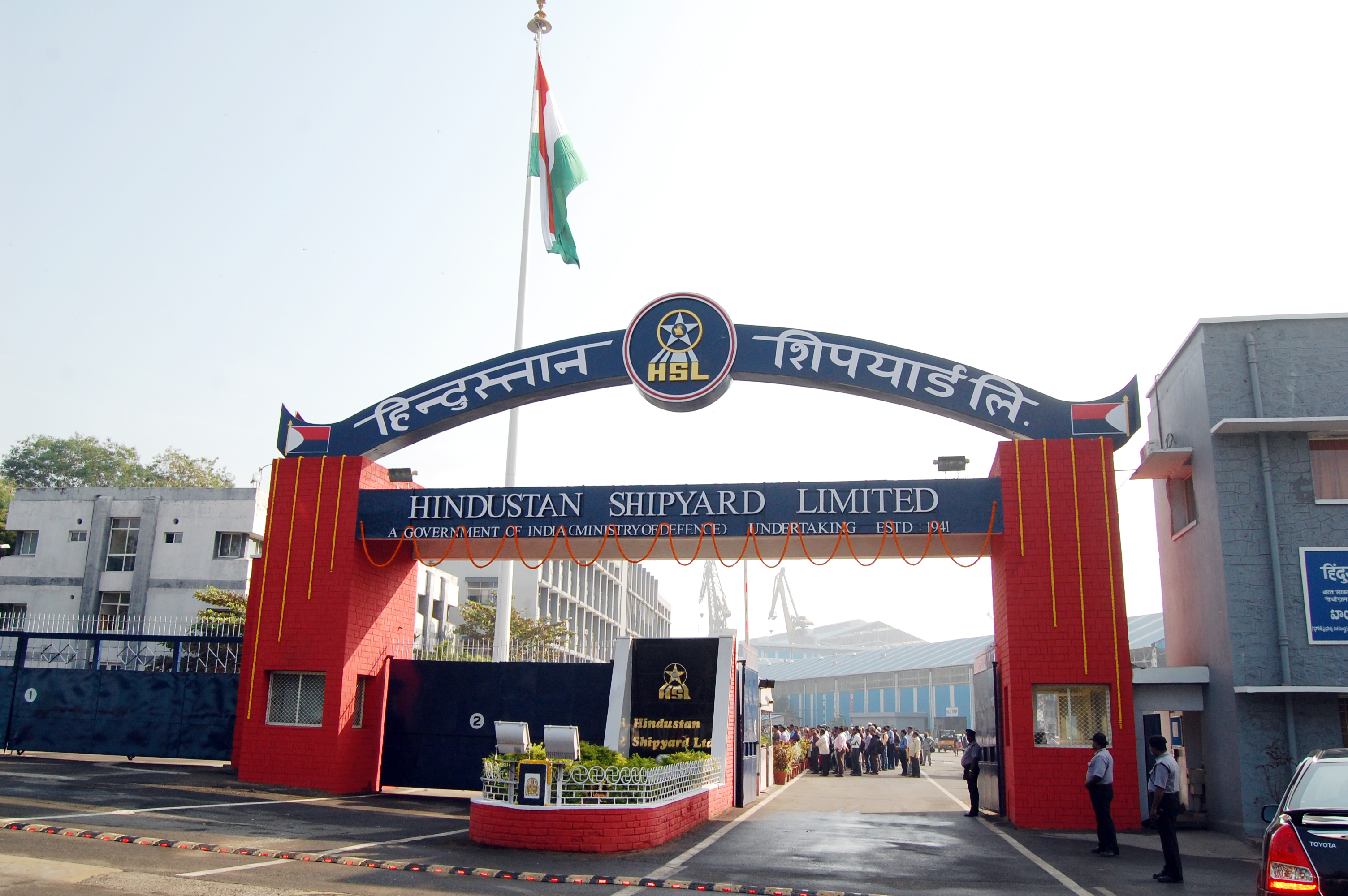
- Type: Public Sector Undertaking
- Industry: Shipbuilding
- Founded: 21 June 1941
- Founder: Walchand Hirachand
- Headquarters: Visakhapatnam, Andhra Pradesh, India
- Key people: Walchand Hirachand (Founder); Commodore; Hemant Khatri (retd.,CMD)
- Services: Ship building Ship repair Submarine Construction and Refits
- Revenue: ▲₹1,579.28 crore (US$160 million) (2024)
- Operating income: ▲₹199.02 crore (US$21 million) (2024)
- Net income: ▲₹118.82 crore (US$12 million) (2024)
- Total assets: ▲₹5,574.91 crore (US$580 million) (2024)
- Total equity: ▲₹−351.27 crore (US$−36 million) (2024)
- Owner: Government of India
- Number of employees: 1473 (March 2019)
- Website: hslvizag.in

Hindustan Shipyard Limited (HSL) is a public sector undertaking shipyard located in Visakhapatnam, on the east coast of India. HSL is a major shipyard in India, with a capacity to manufacture vessels up to 80,000 deadweight tonnage (DWT). The shipyard is the 2nd biggest in India after Cochin Shipyard.

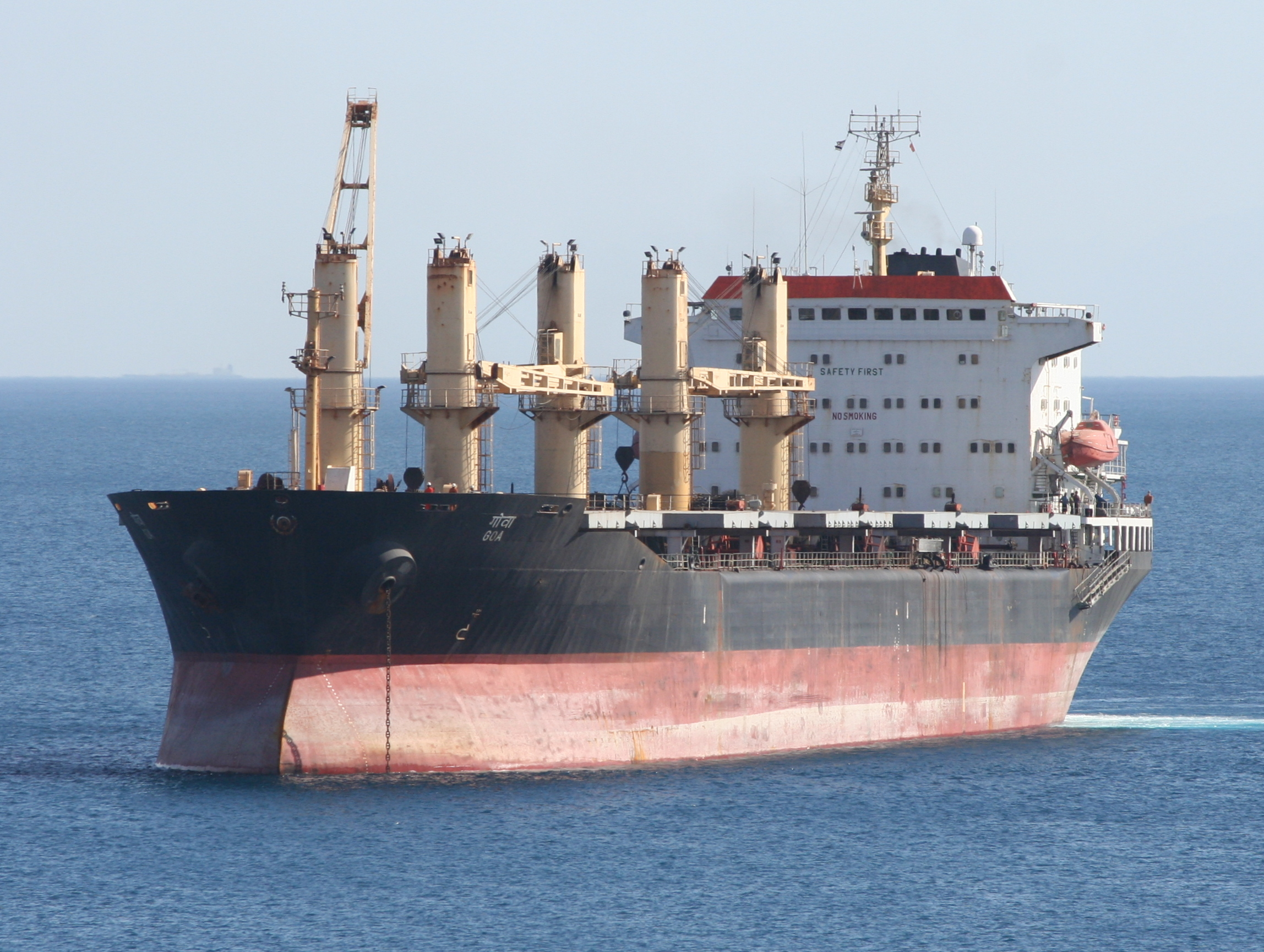
46,259 DWT ship named MV Goa built by Hindustan Shipyard in 1997

== History ==
Founded as the Scindia Shipyard, it was built by industrialist Walchand Hirachand as a part of The Scindia Steam Navigation Company Ltd. Walchand selected Visakhapatnam as a suitable location for the construction of the yard and took possession of the land in November 1940. The foundation stone for the shipyard was laid by Dr. Rajendra Prasad on 21 June 1941, who was at that time the acting Congress President.

The first ship to be constructed fully in India after independence was built at the Scindia Shipyard and named Jal Usha. It was launched in 1948 by Jawaharlal Nehru at a ceremony where the families of Seth Walchand Hirachand, late Narottam Morarjee, and Kilachand Devchand, the partners of Scindia Shipyard, were present along with other dignitaries and industrialists.

Walchand died in 1953, and the Scindia Shipyard continued to operate successfully under the next of kin of the founders. However, in 1961 the shipyard was nationalised and renamed Hindustan Shipyard Limited (HSL).

In 2010, HSL was transferred from the Ministry of Shipping to the Ministry of Defence.

In 2022, Hindustan Shipyard Limited registers highest value of production in its history. the value of production from shipbuilding remained at ₹613 crore marking it as the highest value of production recorded from shipbuilding division in the history of the shipyard.

In April 2025, the shipyard got a profitable turnover in close to four decades after years of narrow losses. The shipyard aims to achieve the miniratna status.

On 9 February 2026, HSL signed an agreement with to form a consortium with Garden Reach Shipbuilders & Engineers (GRSE) in order to undertake "large-scale, strategically significant national shipbuilding programme".

== Ships built by the company ==
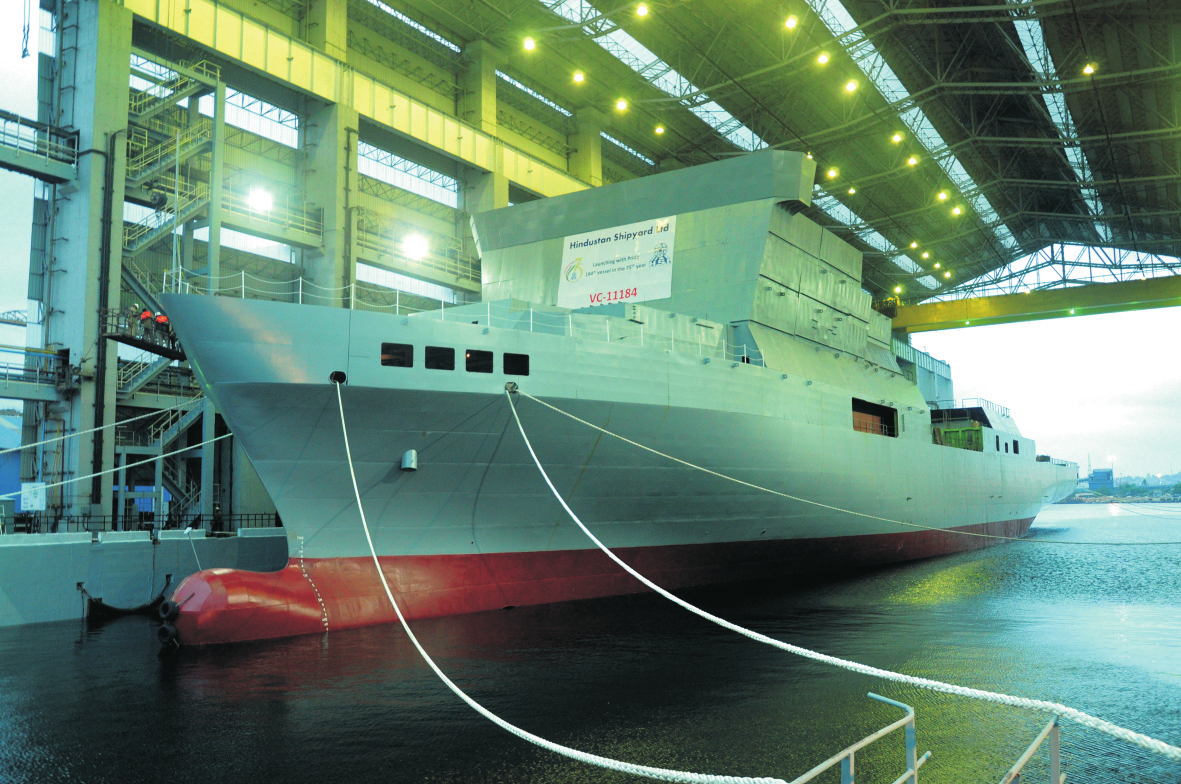
INS Dhruv built by HSL

- Nand Rati (1984)
- Lok Rajeswari (1988)
- MV Goa (1997)
- Tamilnadu (2000)
- MV Good Princess (2008)
- MV Good Pacific (2008)
- Good Precedent (2011)
- Indian Grace (1978)
- Indian Glory (1978)
- Indian Explorer (1976)
- TS Rajendra (1972)
- MV Mayuree Naree (2007)
- INS Dhruv
- Nistar-class diving support vessel
  - INS Nistar
  - INS Nipun
- Surya-class fleet support ship
  - INS Surya

== Facilities ==
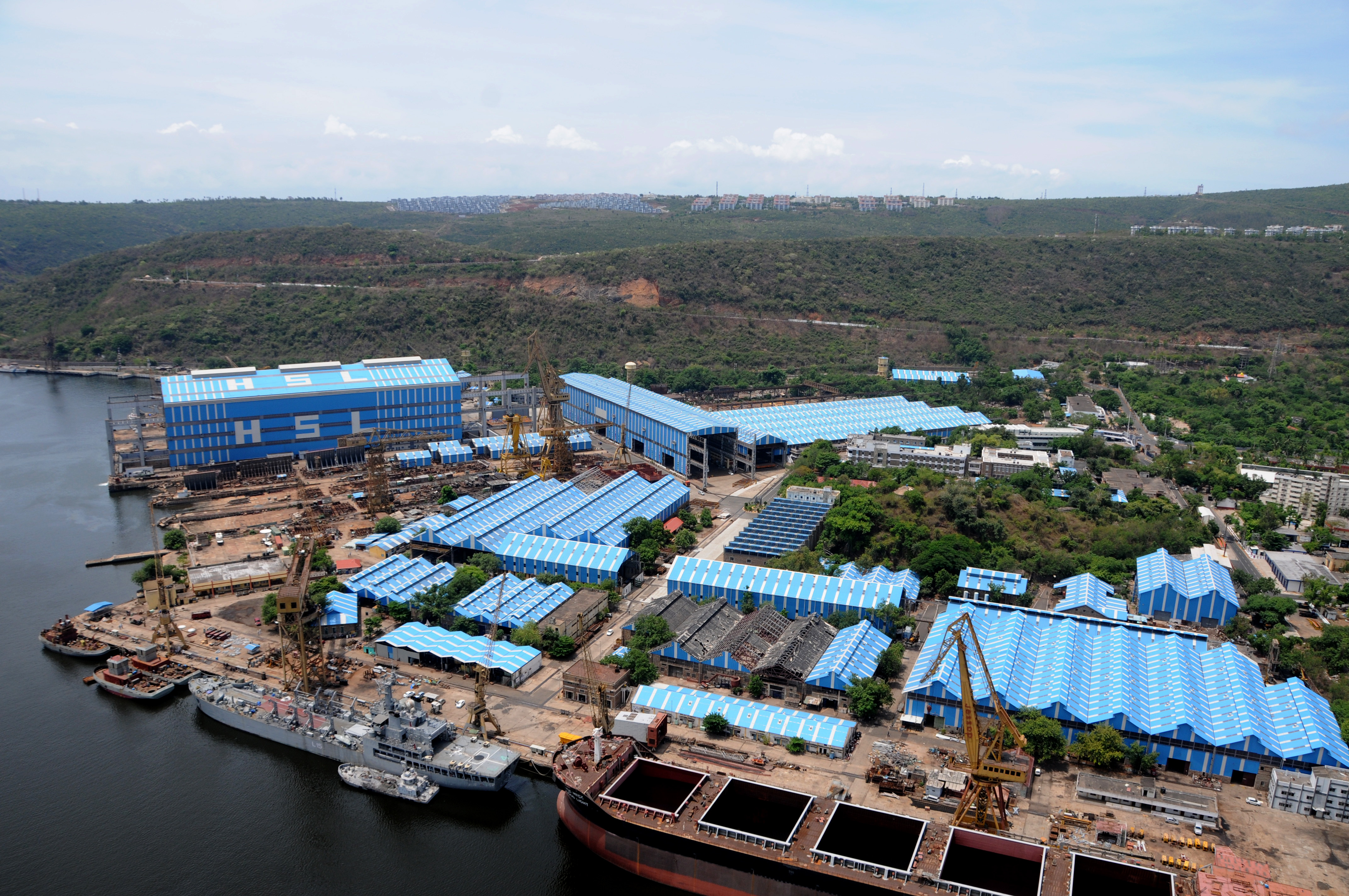
Aerial View of HSL

The shipyard has a 142-acre (0.57 km^{2}) main yard with a 25-acre (0.10 km^{2}) factory extension. It features a 457 m (1,499 ft) outfitting jetty with a 10 m (33 ft) depth, a steel stockyard with a 30,000-tonne capacity. The shipyard's hull and prefabrication shops are equipped with the CNC plasma and oxyacetylene cutting machines, rolling and bending machinery, automatic and semi-automatic welding systems and 300-tonne block handling capacity.

It has a covered building dock for building vessels up to 80,000 DWT. There are three slipways and a 550 m (1,800 ft) fitting-out jetty. A fourth slipway with a dimensions of 235 m × 37.5 m (771 ft × 123 ft) and a 300-tonne Goliath crane spanning Slipway-3 & 4, built by L&T Geostructure with Konecranes, was inaugurated in October 2026 during the launch of INS Surya. This allowed the construction of naval ships of up to 45,000 DWT.

HSL has a dry dock, wet basin and repair delphin for ship and submarine repair and retrofitting.

== Vessels ==
By 2026, HSL has built 203 vessels, repaired 2,045 ships and refitted six submarines. It builds bulk carriers, offshore patrol vessels, survey ships, drillships, offshore platforms and repair and support vessels.

It also conducts major overhauls of the Indian Navy's submarines, and is being equipped to construct nuclear-powered submarines. However, the shipyard has a history of protracted refits. The submarines Vela, Vagli, and Sindhukirti each spent almost 10 years for a single refit at HSL. Whereas a Russian shipyard would deploy 200 workers in three shifts to complete the refit in two years, HSL deployed only 50 workers to work on Sindhukirti.
