= Surya-class fleet support ship =

Series of five fleet tanker vessels for the Indian Navy

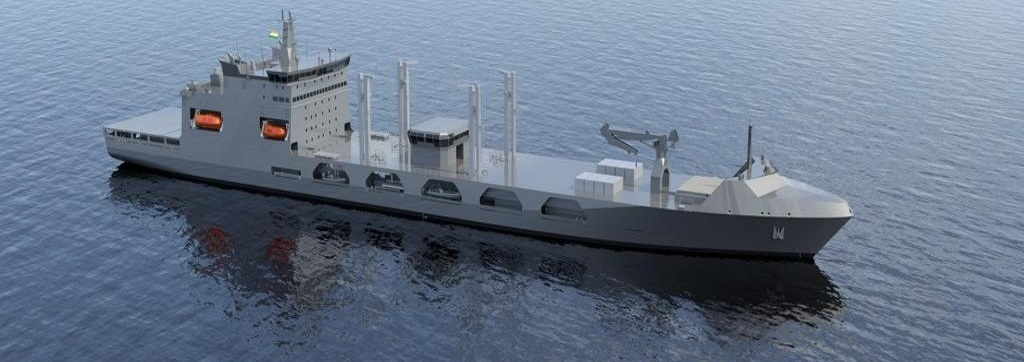
- Render of Surya-class fleet support ship

Class overview
- Builders: Hindustan Shipyard Limited; Kattupalli Shipyard (L&T)
- Operators: Indian Navy
- Preceded by: Deepak class
- Cost: ₹19,000 crore (equivalent to ₹200 billion or US$2.0 billion in 2026) overall cost; ₹3,600 crore (equivalent to ₹37 billion or US$390 million in 2026) per ship
- Planned: 5
- Building: 4
- Completed: 1

General characteristics
- Type: Fleet replenishment oiler
- Displacement: 43,500 t (42,813 long tons)
- Length: 223.6 m (734 ft)
- Beam: 31.5 m (103 ft)
- Draft: 9.3 m (31 ft)
- Propulsion: 2 × MAN 20V32/44CR 12 MW (16,000 hp) marine engines; Two-shaft MWe generator; 1 x RENK Gearbox Type ASL 2x200-E; MAN Alpha controllable pitch propellers with bow thrusters
- Speed: 20 knots (37 km/h; 23 mph)
- Range: 12,000 nmi (22,000 km; 14,000 mi) at 15–16 knots (28–30 km/h; 17–18 mph)
- Armament: Anti-surface, anti-submarine CIWS
- Aircraft carried: 1 × HAL Dhruv
- Aviation facilities: Helipad

The Surya-class fleet support vessels are a series of five fleet tanker being built by Hindustan Shipyard (HSL), Visakhapatnam and Larsen & Toubro at Kattupalli Shipyard for the Indian Navy. The deal was signed on 25 August 2023 with an expected project completion timeline of 8 years. These ships will be an indigenous design by the Hindustan Shipyard's in-house design team. The primary role of the vessels would be to replenish ships of the Indian Navy with fuel, food and various other supplies. With a length of 230 m and displacement of around 45,000 tonnes (44,000 long tons), these will be the heaviest and the second largest class of vessels to enter service with the Indian Navy before 2030.

== History ==
The fleet support ship project was given a go ahead to augment the existing fleet in 2014. Initially, HSL planned to have a design consultancy with Hyundai Heavy Industries. However, the deal fell off due to latter's insistence of manufacturing the first ship in Korea and disagreement in procurement of major components.

TAIS, Turkey emerged as lowest bidder for the project after the negotiations fell between HSL and Hyundai Heavy Industries. TAIS defeated other shipbuilding behemoths from Germany, Russia, Spain. However, the deal got stuck due to Turkey's stance on Jammu and Kashmir. Later, Hindustan Shipyard and Indian Navy signed the contract with TAIS, Turkey. The design consultancy will be provided by Anadolu Shipyard with transfer of technology required for the manufacturing of the ship.

However, after signing the deal on 25 August 2023, it was revealed that the Turkish shipyard was dropped from the deal and now the design and development will be the sole responsibility of Hindustan Shipyard. Kochi based Smart Engineering & Design Solutions Pvt Ltd have also been contracted to aid in the ship design work.

On 3 December 2024, Hindustan Shipyard signed a deal with Kongsberg Maritime under which the latter will supply their electric Replenishment-At-Sea (RAS) equipment for the Fleet Support Ships under construction. This technology is reportedly "faster, safer, and more reliable" for supply operations at sea. The system can transfer over 2 tonnes of solid loads as well as liquids like fuel and drinking water.

On 15 April 2025, Hindustan Shipyard signed another contract with MAN Energy Solutions (rebranded to Everllance in June 2025) for the supply of five main propulsion system for the ships. The shaft generators, a part of the propulsion system, would be manufactured in India. As per the contract MAN would also supervise the installation and commissioning of all equipment on the ships through its Indian subsidiary. Each propulsion system includes two 20V32/44CR engines.

== Construction ==
The Government of India cleared the project for a cost of ₹20,000 crore (equivalent to ₹220 billion or US$2.3 billion in 2026) on 16 August 2023. The final contract for the five fleet support ship with Indian Navy and Hindustan Shipyard was signed on 25 August 2023 for a total value of ₹19,000 crore (equivalent to ₹210 billion or US$2.2 billion in 2026). The first ship will be delivered in 4 years from the date of signing of the contract and subsequent ships will be delivered at 10 – 12 months interval. The total project completion timeline is 8 years.

HSL signed another contract with Larsen & Toubro as a part of which, L&T will manufacture 2 of the Fleet Support Ships at Kattupalli Shipyard under the subsidiary Precision Engineering Systems.

=== Timeline ===
- 10 April 2024: Steel cutting ceremony for the first vessel at Hindustan Shipyard. HSL was also installing a new 300T Goliath crane and slipway upgrades for the construction of these vessels.
- 14 November 2024: Keel laid for the first ship Yard-11200 at Hindustan Shipyard.
- 11 December 2024: Steel cutting ceremony for the second ship took place at Kattupalli Shipyard.
- 21 December 2024: Steel cutting ceremony for the third ship took place at Kattupalli Shipyard.
- 12 March 2025: Keel laid for the second ship FSS-2 at Kattupalli Shipyard.
- 19 June 2025: Steel cutting ceremony for the fourth ship at Hindustan Shipyard.
- 9 July 2025: Keel laid for the third ship FSS-3 at Kattupalli Shipyard.
- 8 May 2026: Steel cutting ceremony for the fifth ship at Hindustan Shipyard.
- 6 October 2026: The defence minister launched FSS-1, christened Surya, and laid the keel for FSS-5.
- Mid-2027: Scheduled to commence deliveries.

== Design ==
The ships have been designed by M/s Smart Engineering & Design Solutions (SEDS), a naval architecture company based in Kakkanad near Kochi. The ships were originally to be designed in Turkey.

The ships, with an indigenous content of 82%, have a displacement of 43,500 tonnes (42,813 long tons) a length of 223.6 metres (734 ft), beam of 31.5 metres (103 ft) and draught of 9.3 metres (31 ft) and incorporates double bottom and double hulls. They will have a cruising speed of 15 knots (28 km/h) with a maximum speed of 20 knots (37 km/h) and an operating range of 12,000 nautical miles (22,000 km) at a speed of 14–15 knots (26–28 km/h). They will have an endurance of 60 days.

The ship class is designed to carry 20,000 tonnes of low-sulphur high-speed diesel, 2,500 tonnes of aviation turbine fuel, 1,000 tonnes of fresh water and 250 tonnes of feed water, and up to eight 20-foot containers for ammunition, spare parts and provisions. The workshops of the ship can provide first-line maintenance and emergency repairs for the vessels it supports. The ships will be equipped with a helicopter deck to support operations (upto Sea State 5) a multi-role helicopter..

The ships will be equipped with state of the art refueling facility with originally planned pumping rates of up to 2,400 TPH. The ships would be equipped with anti-ship, anti-submarine and CIWS weapons systems.

The main propulsion system from MAN Energy Solutions of the ships includes two 20V32/44CR four-stroke marine engines [12 MW (16,000 hp) output] in CODAD configuration, two-shaft generators (1 MWe capacity each), a water-lubricated stern-tube system, MAN Alpha controllable pitch propeller as well as associated gearboxes and bow thrusters.

== Ships of the class ==
Name	Pennant	Yard No	Builders	Laid down	Launched	Commissioned	Home-port	Status
Indian Navy
Surya		11200	Hindustan Shipyard	14 November 2024	6 October 2026	Mid-2027(Expected)		Launched
FSS-2		11201	Kattupalli Shipyard	12 March 2025				Under construction
FSS-3		11202	Kattupalli Shipyard	9 July 2025				Under construction
FSS-4		11203	Hindustan Shipyard					Under construction
FSS-5		11204	Hindustan Shipyard	6 October 2026				Under construction

== Gallery ==
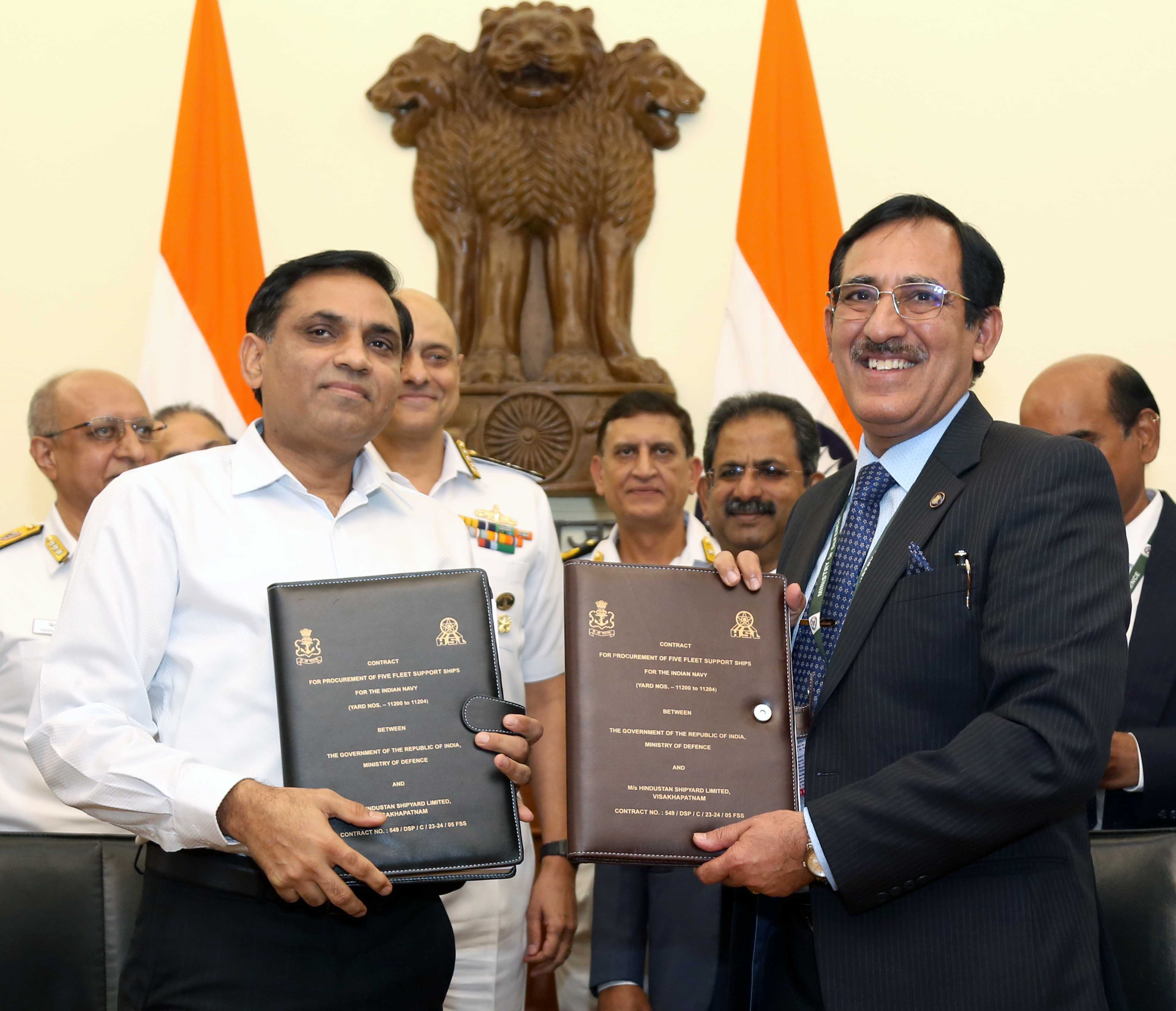
Contract signing between Hindustan Shipyard and Ministry of Defence for Fleet Support ship.

== See also ==
- Future of the Indian Navy
- INS Jyoti (A58)
- INS Aditya (A59)
- Type 901 fast combat support ship
- Supply-class fast combat support ship
