= INS Aditya =

Ship

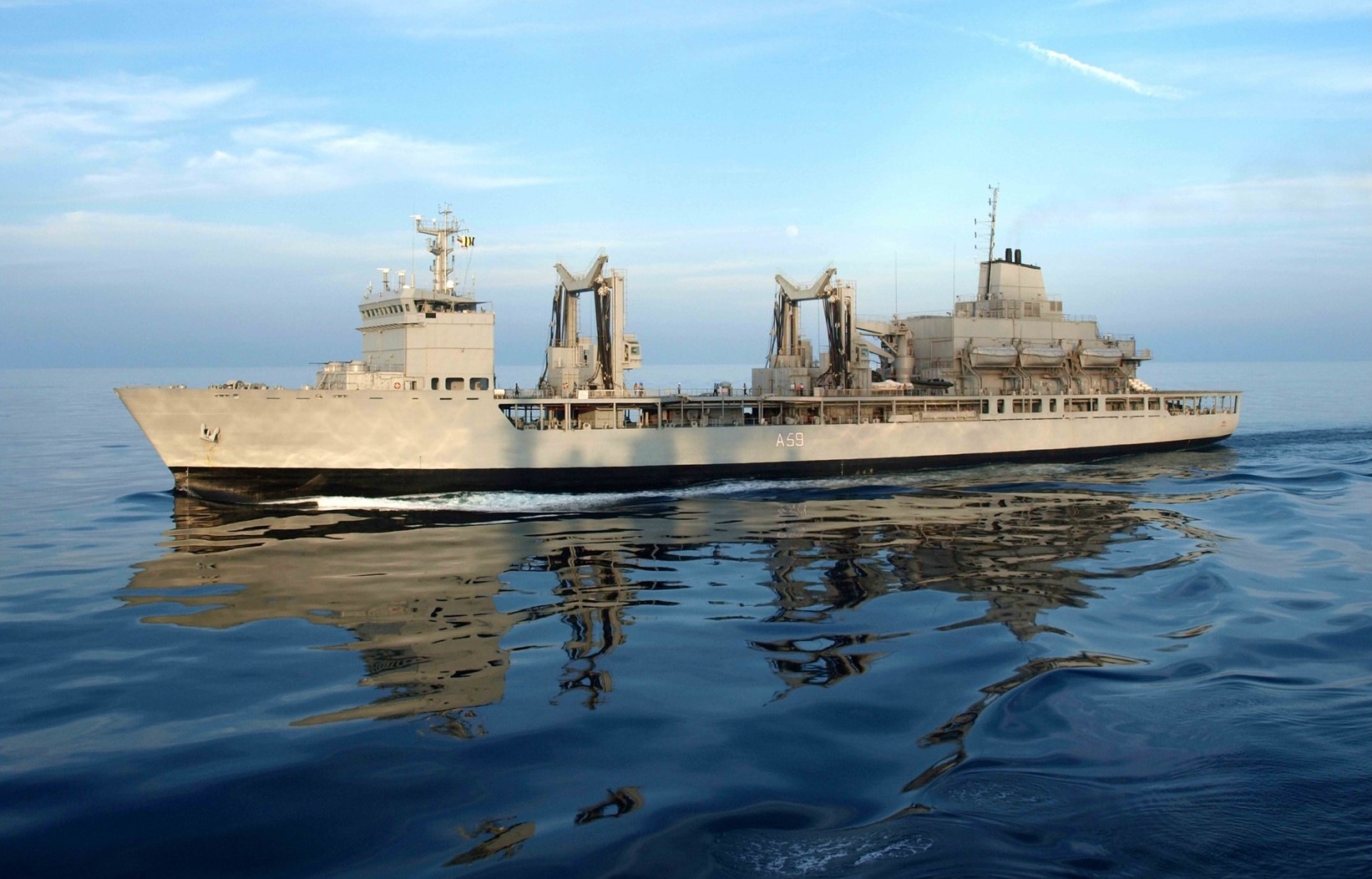
- INS Aditya near Goa, India

History

India
- Name: Aditya
- Namesake: Surya, a Solar deity in Hinduism
- Builder: Garden Reach Shipbuilders and Engineers
- Launched: 15 November 1993
- Commissioned: 3 April 2000
- Identification: IMO number: 8609656; MMSI number: 419049600; Hull number: A59
- Motto: "Sustenance for Victory and Beyond"
- Status: Active

Class overview
- Name: Aditya class
- Builders: Garden Reach Shipbuilders and Engineers
- Operators: Indian Navy
- Preceded by: Deepak class; Komandarm Fedko class
- Succeeded by: Deepak class
- In commission: April 2000-present
- Completed: 1
- Active: 1

General characteristics
- Class & type: Aditya-class replenishment and repair ship
- Displacement: 24,612 tons full load
- Length: 172.0 m (564 ft 4 in)
- Beam: 23.0 m (75 ft 6 in)
- Draft: 7.5 m (24 ft 7 in)
- Propulsion: 2 × ECR MAN B&W 16V 40/45 diesel engines with 23,972 hp (17,876 kW) and 1 shaft, 3 × 500 kW generators and 2 x 1,500 kW power take-off shaft generators
- Speed: 20 knots (37 km/h; 23 mph)
- Range: 10,000 mi (16,000 km) at 16 knots (30 km/h; 18 mph)
- Complement: 191 and 6 aircrew
- Armament: 1 × SA-N-10 SAM launcher with 24 missiles; 3 × 2A42 30 mm (1.2 in) Medak guns
- Aircraft carried: 1 HAL Chetak

INS Aditya (A59) is an Aditya-class replenishment and repair ship in service with the Indian Navy. The ship was launched on 15 November 1993 and commissioned on 3 April 2000.

Aditya is a fully air-conditioned and lengthened version of the original Deepak class, but with a multipurpose workshop and with four replenishment at sea (RAS) stations alongside. The ship was built at Garden Reach Shipbuilders and Engineers (GRSE). Building progress was very slow and the ship was plagued by propulsion problems, during her sea trials in September 1999.

== Description ==
The ship has a cargo capacity of 2,250 m^{3} (79,000 cu ft) water, 2,170 m^{3} (77,000 cu ft) ammunition and stores and 14,200 m^{3} (500,000 cu ft) diesel and aviation kerosene. The ship can carry 12,000 tons of liquid cargo, comprising LSHSD, aviation kerosene, distilled and fresh water and 5,000 tons of solid cargo. The ship features a Hallapa deck and Canadian Hepburn RAS equipment. Aditya is also equipped with a 2-ton heavy jackstay and a 20-ton crane. It can replenish four warships and one rotor aircraft simultaneously and was designed to be able to serve as command and control platform. It can refuel at the maximum rate of 600 tonnes per hour.

Aditya was initially armed with light and medium machine guns. The self-defence capability was added by installing new close-in weapons like anti-aircraft and anti-missile guns and missiles. Even though it is smaller than INS Jyoti, it has more advanced capabilities. It carries a helicopter as compared to only a helicopter deck of Jyoti.

== Service history ==
In 2010, Aditya, along with three other warships of the navy - INS Mysore, INS Tabar and INS Ganga, were deployed to South Africa and took part in the 2nd IBSAMAR, the joint military exercise of the navies of India, Brazil, and South Africa. A total of 11 warships took part in the exercise, which was conducted off the coast of Durban from 13 to 27 September.

In mid-July 2024, Aditya and INS Visakhapatnam conducted an exercise with United States Navy's Carrier Strike Group 9 centred on USS Theodore Roosevelt along with Carrier Air Wing 11 and USS Daniel Inouye in the Indian Ocean.

== Gallery ==
INS Aditya
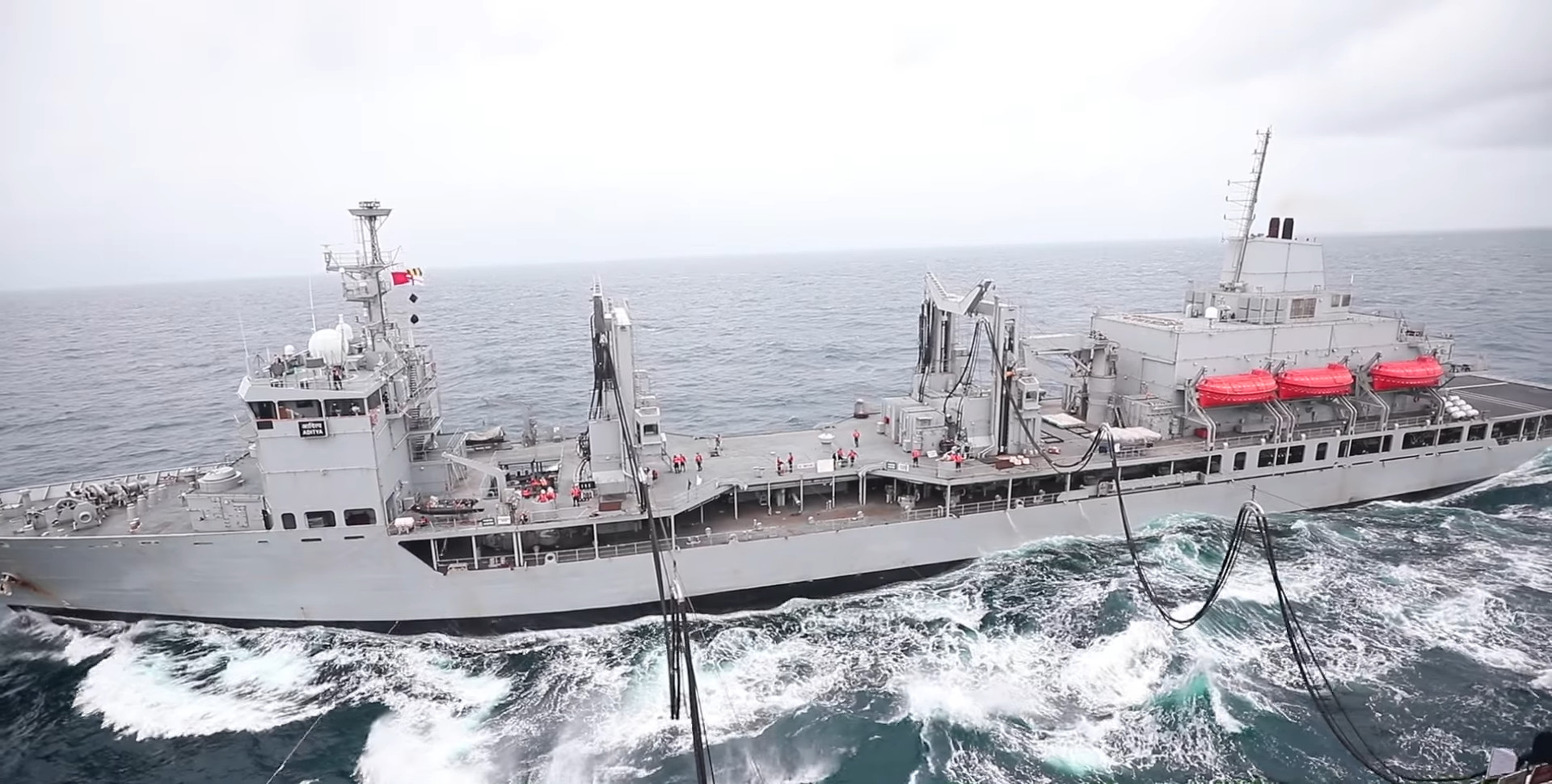
Aditya refueling the aircraft carrier INS Vikramaditya

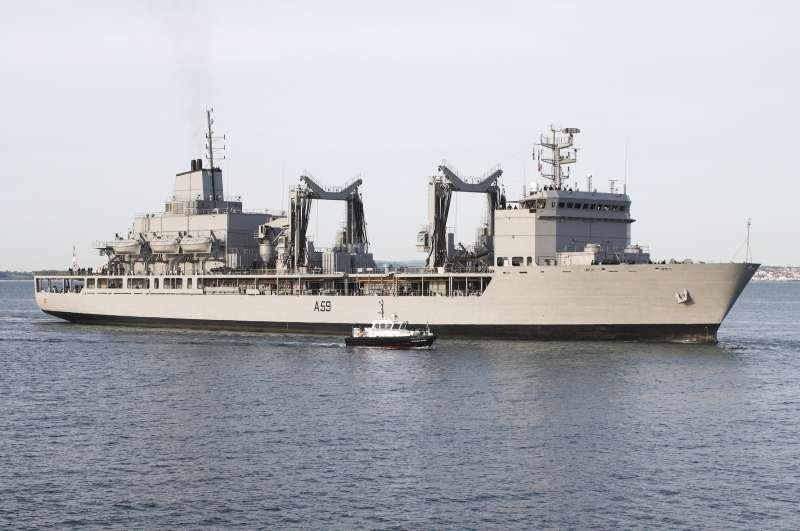
Aditya at sea

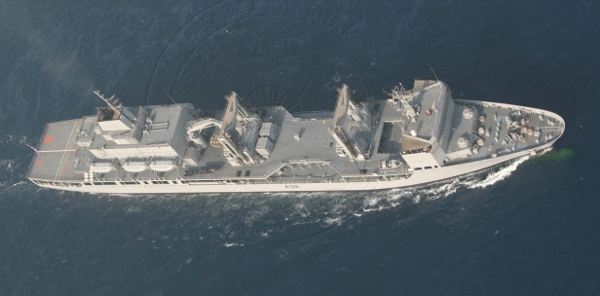
Top view of Aditya

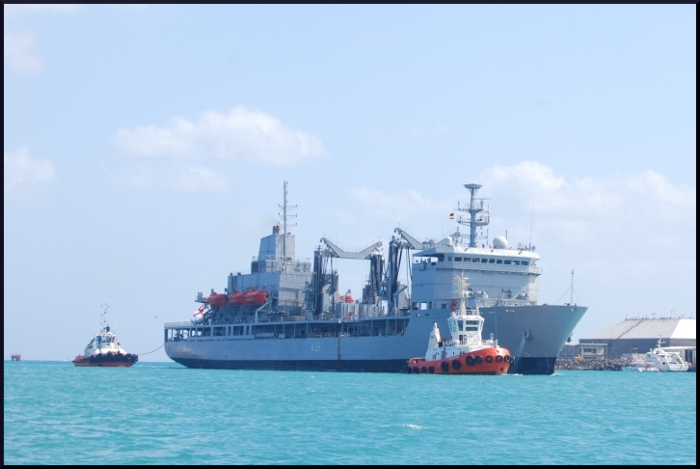
Aditya during a berthing operation.

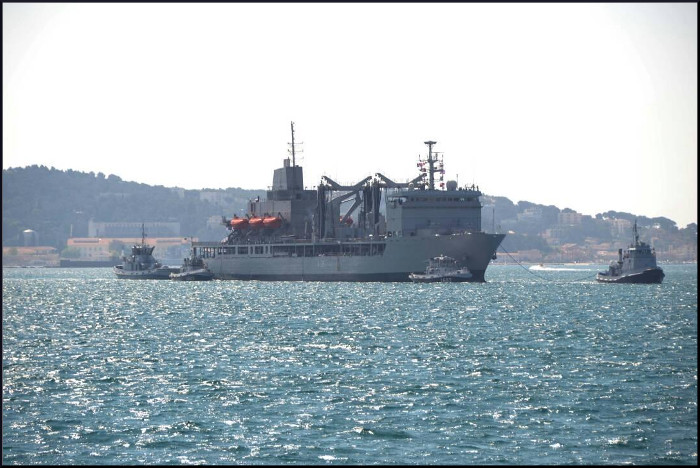
Aditya arriving at Toulon, France

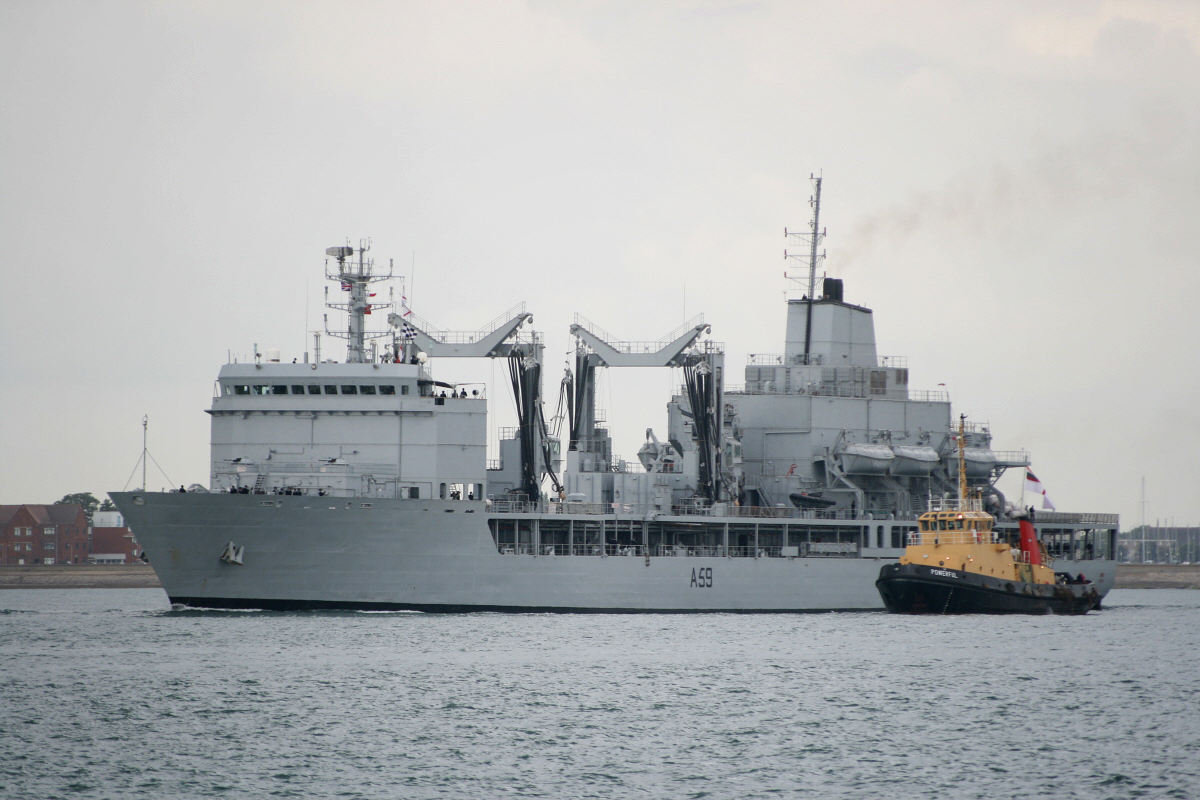
Aditya departing Portsmouth Naval Base, United Kingdom, 20 June 2009.

== See also ==
- INS Deepak
- INS Shakti
- Komandarm Fedko-class oiler
