= USS Blueback (SS-581) =

Submarine of the United States

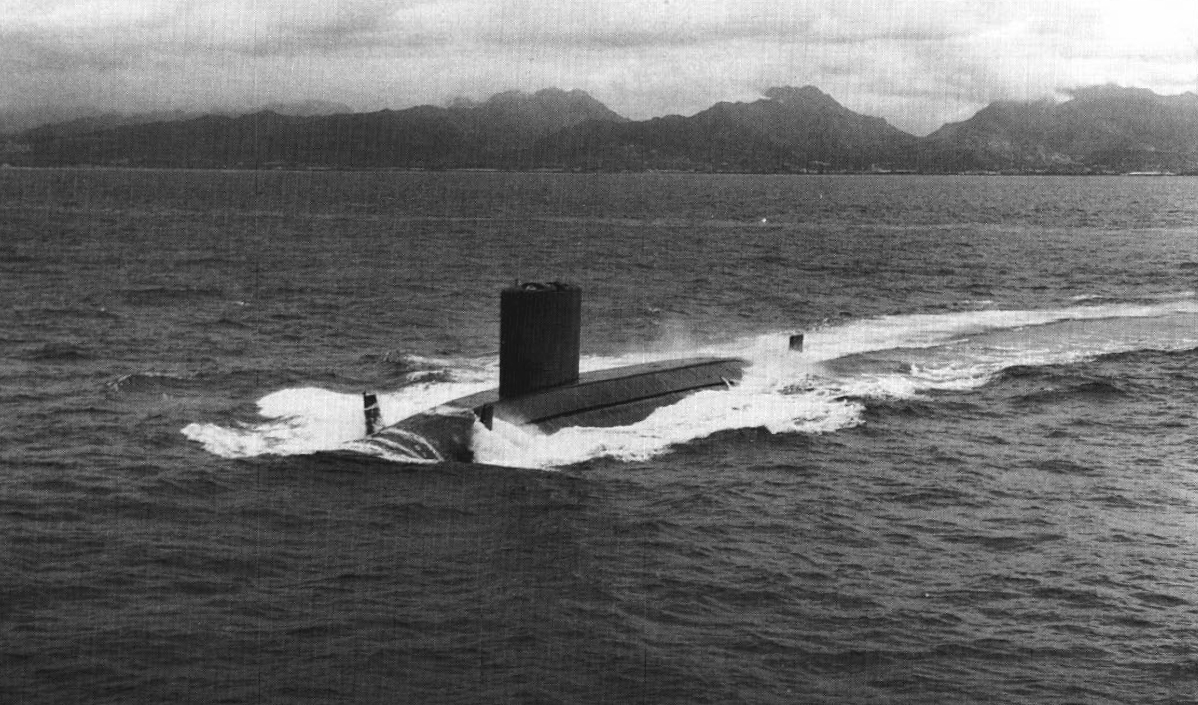
- USS Blueback (SS-581) in the 1960s

History

United States
- Namesake: Blueback
- Awarded: 29 June 1956
- Builder: Ingalls Shipbuilding, Pascagoula, Mississippi
- Laid down: 15 April 1957
- Launched: 16 May 1959
- Sponsored by: Mrs. Kenmore McManes, wife of Rear Admiral McManes
- Commissioned: 15 October 1959
- Decommissioned: 1 October 1990
- Stricken: 30 October 1990
- Status: Donated to the Oregon Museum of Science and Industry
- Badge

General characteristics
- Class & type: Barbel-class diesel-electric submarine
- Displacement: 1,744 long tons (1,772 t) light; 2,146 long tons (2,180 t) full; 2,637 long tons (2,679 t) submerged; 402 long tons (408 t) dead
- Length: 219 ft 6 in (66.90 m) overall
- Beam: 29 ft (8.8 m)
- Draft: 25 ft (7.6 m) max
- Propulsion: 3 × Fairbanks-Morse 38 8-1/8 diesel engines, total 3,150 bhp (2,350 kW); 2 × General Electric electric motors, total 4,800 bhp (3,600 kW); one screw
- Speed: 12 knots (22 km/h; 14 mph) surfaced; 25 knots (46 km/h; 29 mph) submerged
- Endurance: 30 minutes at full speed; 102 hours at 3 knots (6 km/h; 3 mph)
- Test depth: 712 ft (217 m) operating; 1,050 ft (320 m) collapse
- Complement: 8 officers, 69 men
- Armament: 6 × 21 in (533 mm) bow torpedo tubes, 18 torpedoes
- USS Blueback
- U.S. National Register of Historic Places
- Location within Portland, Oregon
- Location: Oregon Museum of Science and Industry
- Coordinates: 45°30′28″N 122°40′01″W
- NRHP reference No.: 08000947
- Added to NRHP: 18 September 2008

USS Blueback (SS-581) is a Barbel-class submarine that served in the United States Navy from 1959 to 1990, and subsequently was made into an exhibit at the Oregon Museum of Science and Industry. She was the second Navy submarine to bear the name.

Blueback was laid down by Ingalls Shipbuilding Corporation of Pascagoula, Mississippi on 15 April 1957. She was launched on 16 May 1959 sponsored by Virginia McManes, wife of Rear Admiral Kenmore M. McManes, and commissioned on 15 October 1959, Lieutenant Commander Robert H. Gautier in command.

She was the last non-nuclear submarine to join the United States Navy and was the final conventionally powered combat capable submarine to be decommissioned, which left the United States Navy with a fully nuclear submarine fleet, with the exception of the research submarine USS Dolphin which served until 2007.

== Origin of the name ==
Sources differ on the origin of Blueback's name. The Dictionary of American Naval Fighting Ships entry for Blueback states that she is named after a

form of the rainbow or steelhead trout found only in Lake Crescent on the Olympic Peninsula in Washington state. The fish lives in deep water and is bluish black along its upper sides and whitish underneath.

Other sources state that she is named after the

most numerous of west coast salmon species. The blueback salmon ... is colored a bright blue with silver sides.

== Service ==
=== 1960s ===
After fitting out, Blueback got underway in January 1960 for a series of acceptance trials in the Gulf of Mexico. She completed that mission and departed Pascagoula on 11 June, bound for the Pacific. She transited the Panama Canal on 7 July and continued on to her home port, Naval Station San Diego. There she was assigned to Submarine Squadron 3 (SUBRON 3), Submarine Force, Pacific Fleet. Blueback then carried out torpedo tube acceptance trials at Keyport, Washington, and underwent a post-shakedown availability at the Mare Island Naval Shipyard. On 23 November 1960, the submarine was accepted for service.

Type training in the San Diego area kept her busy into February 1961. On 11 February, she commenced a two-week availability at the Mare Island Naval Shipyard. Blueback got underway on 28 March for a deployment to the western Pacific during which she participated in 7th Fleet operations and exercises. The submarine left Yokosuka, Japan, on 3 September and sailed submerged to San Diego, arriving there on 25 September.

After leave and upkeep, Blueback began type training exercises out of San Diego on 14 October. Four days later, she participated in a fleet exercise off the southern California coast conducted under the auspices of the Chief of Naval Operations (CNO). During the next eight months, the submarine took part in several fleet exercises and visited San Francisco, California, and Seattle, Washington. In July 1962, Blueback entered the Mare Island Naval Shipyard for her first major overhaul.

Upon completion of the overhaul in January 1963, the submarine made port calls at Seattle and at Vancouver, British Columbia. She then left the west coast and proceeded to her new home port, Pearl Harbor, Hawaii. There, the submarine was assigned to Submarine Division 13 (SUBDIV 13). Blueback was involved in local operations from February to early April. On 11 April, the submarine got underway for operations in WestPac.

Blueback sailed to Australia to participate in the annual celebration of the anniversary of the Battle of the Coral Sea and visited Brisbane, Melbourne, and Perth. She then continued on to Subic Bay in the Philippines for operations with the 7th Fleet. While on her deployment, Blueback also called at Naha, Okinawa; and at Sasebo, Kobe, and Yokosuka, Japan, before returning to Pearl Harbor on 26 October.

Blueback resumed her former routine in Hawaiian waters and continued local operations into 1964. In March, she suffered damage when a crane toppled over onto her while changing her propeller, necessitating a drydocking for repairs. In the fall and early winter, the submarine made two trips to the vicinity of Wake Island to take part in the evaluations of the SUBROC missile system and Permit-class submarines. In each test, Blueback served as a target ship.

On 17 February 1965, Blueback began her second deployment to the Far East. During the cruise, she made port calls at Naha, Hong Kong, Subic Bay, and Yokosuka, and also was involved in supporting American operations in Vietnam. She returned to Pearl Harbor in June, where she carried out local operations until 7 September. She got underway for Bremerton, Washington, on that day and entered the Puget Sound Naval Shipyard 18 days later for overhaul.

The yard work ended on 26 September 1966, and the submarine commenced sound trials and weapons tests in Puget Sound. She also provided services for a research and development project conducted near Nanoose, Canada. After a four-day visit to Vancouver, she set sail for Pearl Harbor, where she arrived early in November and began refresher training.

Following three months of preparations and training, Blueback embarked on another tour of duty in the western Pacific on 17 February 1967. During the seven-month assignment, she punctuated periods at sea training and supporting the American efforts in the Vietnam War with port calls at Hong Kong and in Japan at Yokosuka and Sasebo. The submarine returned to Oahu early that fall, arriving in Pearl Harbor on 20 September. After a month of leave and upkeep, she resumed operations in Hawaiian waters. On 19 December, she entered the Pearl Harbor Naval Shipyard for a restricted availability.

In mid-January 1968, the submarine helped prospective commanding officers to prepare for their new assignments at the Pacific Fleet Submarine Force's school. She then acted as a target for several surface ships and aircraft to practice ASW techniques, and engaged in type training and weapons exercises. On 8 July, she began a five-month deployment to the Far East which, in addition to two special operations, also included much time spent in upkeep at Yokosuka. Blueback returned to Pearl Harbor on 3 December.

=== 1970s ===
Very early in 1969, she voyaged to Bremerton, and entered the Puget Sound Naval Shipyard on 17 January for an overhaul. During her subsequent sea trials and training, the submarine visited Nanaimo, British Columbia, and Port Angeles, Washington, before returning to Hawaii early in December. After intensive training during the first three months of 1970, Blueback set sail on her fifth deployment to the western Pacific on 10 April. She carried out lengthy special operations; made brief visits to Yokosuka, Hong Kong, and Guam; and spent time in the Vietnam war zone.

The warship ended the cruise at Pearl Harbor on 1 October and began a period of local operations and upkeep. On 12 February 1971, she entered the Pearl Harbor Naval Shipyard for a restricted availability, which concluded in late March with trials at sea. Early in April, she took part in SUBASWEX 1-71 in the Pearl Harbor area. After conducting torpedo firing exercises, Blueback entered upkeep at Pearl Harbor.

She began another Far eastern assignment on 25 June and arrived at Yokosuka on 12 July for a week of upkeep before beginning a month of operational training at sea. The submarine next visited Sasebo for 10 days and then continued on to Hong Kong for a liberty period. Blueback traveled south to the Vietnam war zone to render training services to destroyer units of the 7th Fleet and then returned to Japan for upkeep at Yokosuka. On 11 October, the submarine got underway for more training at sea. She paused once again at Yokosuka before sailing for Hawaii on 29 November. She arrived back in her home port on 14 December.

Local operations occupied her during the first 10 weeks of 1972. On 29 March, the submarine began a lengthy overhaul at the Pearl Harbor Naval Shipyard. Nearly a year later early in March 1973, she finished the yard work, commenced local operations and trained in preparation for deployment. She sailed for the Orient on 8 August and, while there, participated in several operations with other American warships as well as with naval forces from Korea and Taiwan. Among the ports she visited were Yokosuka and Sasebo, Japan; Chinhae and Pusan, Korea; Buckner Bay, Okinawa; Hong Kong; and Subic Bay in the Philippines. On 5 January 1974, Blueback left Subic Bay and visited Keelung, Taiwan, for two days before heading back to Hawaii.

The submarine arrived in Pearl Harbor on 31 January 1974 and commenced a leave and upkeep period. During the remainder of the year, Blueback took part in numerous training operations and exercises. She provided services to surface ships and aircraft, conducted torpedo firing drills, and did another tour preparing prospective commanding officers for the new jobs.

During the first two months of 1975, the submarine continued local operations. In March, she participated in Exercise "RIMPAC 75", which included ships from the navies of the United States, Canada, Australia, and New Zealand. Upon completion of this operation, Blueback commenced a restricted availability. Early in June, she resumed local operations including a series of torpedo firing tests, type training, and services to surface and air units. The warship closed out the year in upkeep at Pearl Harbor.

She held sea trials and weapons exercises in January 1976 and began another long overhaul at the Pearl Harbor Naval Shipyard in February. She completed those repairs on 1 December. Blueback commenced refresher training 12 days later. In February 1977, she took part in Exercise "RIMPAC 77", then conducted torpedo trials. After a brief period of upkeep, the submarine departed Pearl Harbor on 28 March and proceeded to her new home port, San Diego, arriving there on 8 April.

After an inspection and services to aircraft, she set out for San Francisco on 27 May, made a brief visit, and returned to San Diego on 1 June to prepare for duty overseas. On 21 June, the submarine got underway for Santa Marta, Colombia. Upon arriving there on 7 August, she joined Task Force 138 to participate in UNITAS XVIII. The task force included USS Mahan, USS Capodanno, and USS Vreeland. During the deployment, Blueback visited ports in Colombia, Panama, Ecuador, Peru, and Chile. She departed Talcahuano, Chile, on 27 September and headed back to San Diego. She stopped at Rodman in the Panama Canal Zone, and made a four-day liberty call at Acapulco, Mexico, before reaching San Diego on 11 November.

The submarine began 1978 in upkeep. She got underway on 13 February for a short visit to San Francisco, returned to San Diego on the 21st, and provided services to ships and aircraft in the San Diego area. From 23 April to 23 May, she underwent a battery replacement in preparation for an upcoming deployment. The ship sailed on 30 May for Portland, Oregon, where she represented the Submarine Force at that city's Rose Festival. She then continued north along the coast to conduct an exercise with Canadian forces off Esquimalt, British Columbia. Following this operation, Blueback arrived at Seattle on 23 June for a two-day liberty call before returning to San Diego.

The submarine began a restricted availability on 17 July and, on 8 August, began final preparations for deployment. On 11 September, she got underway for her eighth western Pacific cruise. She touched at Pearl Harbor on the 22nd, but soon pressed on for Japan, and arrived at Yokosuka on 7 October. She next made a run to Chinhae, Korea, for two weeks of joint special warfare and ASW exercises with units of the South Korean Navy.

On 5 November, Blueback arrived in Kaohsiung, Taiwan, to participate in ASW exercises with the Taiwanese Navy. From 14 to 24 November, she took part in a 7th Fleet exercise and then proceeded to Sasebo for a leave and upkeep period. Blueback then spent five days at Hong Kong from 6 to 11 December before heading on to Subic Bay where she arrived on 13 December to close out the year in upkeep.

Blueback got underway on 5 January 1979 to provide target services for ships of the 7th Fleet undergoing ASW training. She then took part in special warfare exercises with Army Special Forces troops. On 22 January, the submarine arrived at Subic Bay for upkeep. Nine days later, she set out on a submerged voyage back to the United States and reached San Diego on 1 March.

After a few weeks of leave and upkeep, the submarine took up local operations again and continued so engaged until beginning a tender availability on 14 May. She resumed local operations again on 12 June. Blueback sailed north on 18 August to visit Astoria, Oregon, and Seattle, Wash., returning to her home port early in September. Following a minelaying exercise off the southern California coast between 17 and 20 September, the submarine entered drydock on 1 October. She began sea trials on 27 November and then provided ASW services before closing the year in a holiday leave and upkeep status.

=== 1980s ===
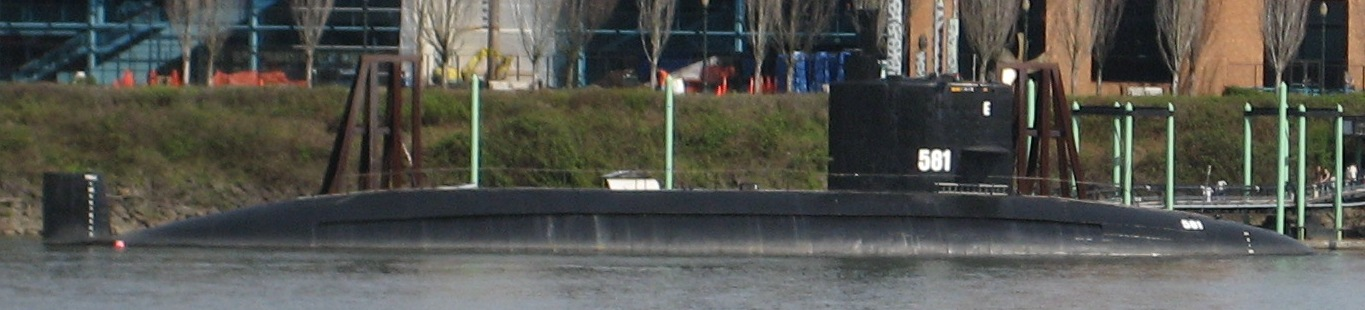
USS Blueback at her mooring outside of OMSI on the Willamette River in Portland Oregon

Blueback spent the first three and a half months of 1980 in local operations and exercises in preparation for overseas movement. Blueback departed San Diego on 15 April and completed her submerged transit of the Pacific at Okinawa on 11 May. The submarine then took part in ASW exercises in the Philippine Sea. She began upkeep at Yokosuka on 18 May and then got underway for special operations. Blueback began the month of June in upkeep at Sasebo but soon returned to sea to participate in joint exercises with South Korean forces.

After another period of upkeep and liberty at Sasebo, she got underway on the 22nd for ASW operations in cooperation with the Japanese submarine Isoshio. At the conclusion of the exercise, Blueback visited Beppu, Japan, before heading for Subic Bay, where she arrived on 8 July. After upkeep, the submarine participated in an ASW exercise in the South China Sea with several ships of the 7th Fleet.

On 22 July, Blueback began a six-day journey to Chinhae to take part in extensive exercises with the South Korean Navy. Early in August, the submarine visited Sasebo and Subic Bay. She conducted special warfare operations from 18 to 21 August and then entered port at San Fernando on northern Luzon. She got underway on 25 August for ASW operations with ships of the Royal Navy.

After a final call at Subic Bay, the submarine began her voyage back to home port on 15 September. She entered San Diego on 15 October and began post-deployment leave and upkeep. Then came several days of type training in nearby waters followed by holiday leave and upkeep to close out the year.

[1980-1990]

== Decommissioning and status ==
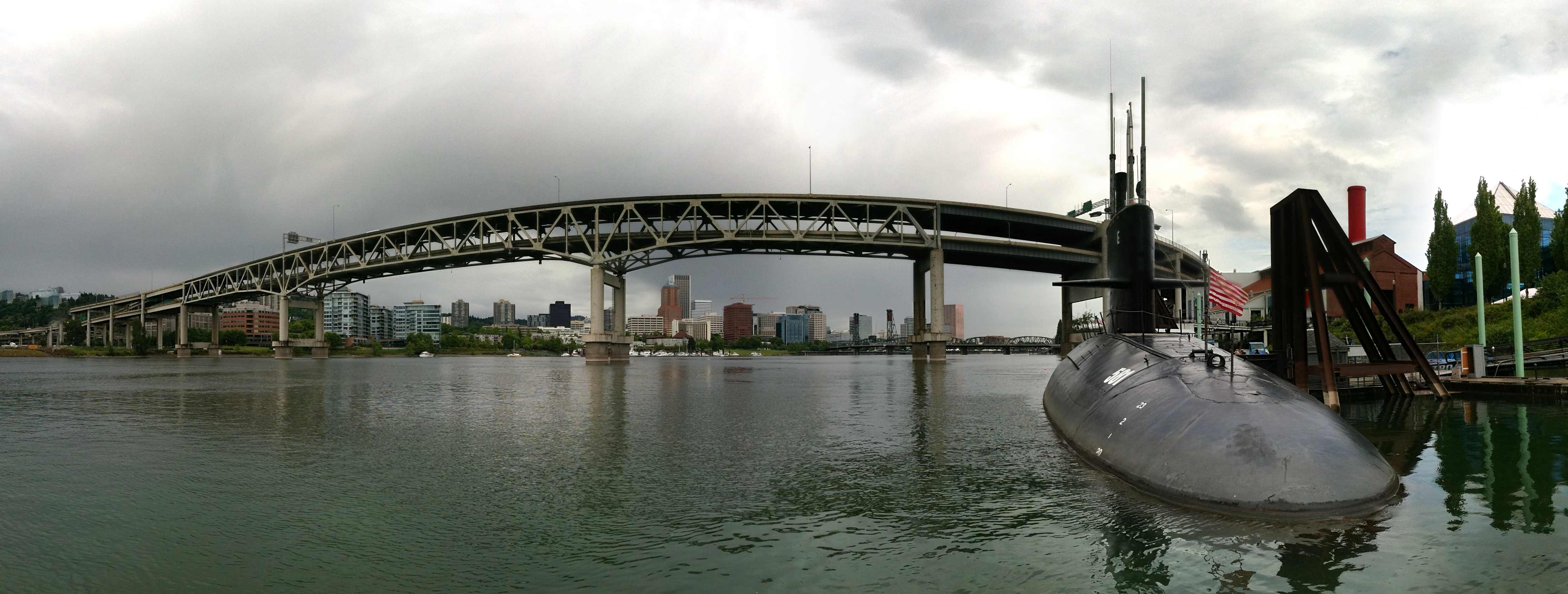
USS Blueback at her mooring on the Willamette River in Portland with the Marquam Bridge in the background.

Blueback was decommissioned on 1 October 1990 and laid up in the Pacific Reserve Fleet in Bremerton, Washington. She was struck from the Naval Vessel Register on 30 October 1990. With her removal from service, the last warship that was a diesel-electric submarine of the United States Navy had left the fleet, leaving the research submarine USS Dolphin (AGSS-555) as the last diesel submarine of the US fleet.

The screw from SS-581 Blueback now installed at the Oregon Museum of Science and Industry as the National Submarine Memorial.

In February 1994 the Oregon Museum of Science and Industry (OMSI) towed Blueback to Portland, Oregon, where she now rests as an interactive part of the museum and a memorial. Her propeller was removed and installed outside the museum as a National Submarine Memorial. OMSI offers short guided tours of the submarine several times a day and three-hour technical tours twice a month. The vessel was added to the National Register of Historic Places in September 2008.

The radio room has been restored by the USS Blueback Radio Club with both historic military radios and operational modern amateur radio gear which use the original military HF and VHF antennas. The submarine's radio call sign is now W7SUB.

== Honors and awards ==
- Vietnam Service Medal with two campaign stars for Vietnam War service

== Popular culture ==
Blueback appeared in the episode "Samurai" of the 1970s television series Hawaii Five-O.

Blueback appeared in the 1990 movie The Hunt for Red October, although she did not perform the famous stunt of an emergency main ballast tank blow during an emergency surfacing procedure seen in the film. A film crew was allowed on board to film a torpedo room scene and some of her crew were paid $50 (USD) each to have their hair cut and to put on Soviet Navy uniforms for the scene. Only a few seconds of what was filmed appears in the film.

Blueback and the OMSI (standing in for the fictional Boston Science Museum) appeared in The Librarians season 3 premiere episode "...and the Rise of Chaos."

== See also ==
- USS Albacore (AGSS-569) unarmed, concept test, research submarine which led to the new shape of the Barbel-class submarine Dry Docked for easy viewing near her Home in Portsmouth (NH) park/museum.
