= Hai Kun-class submarine =

Class of attack submarine

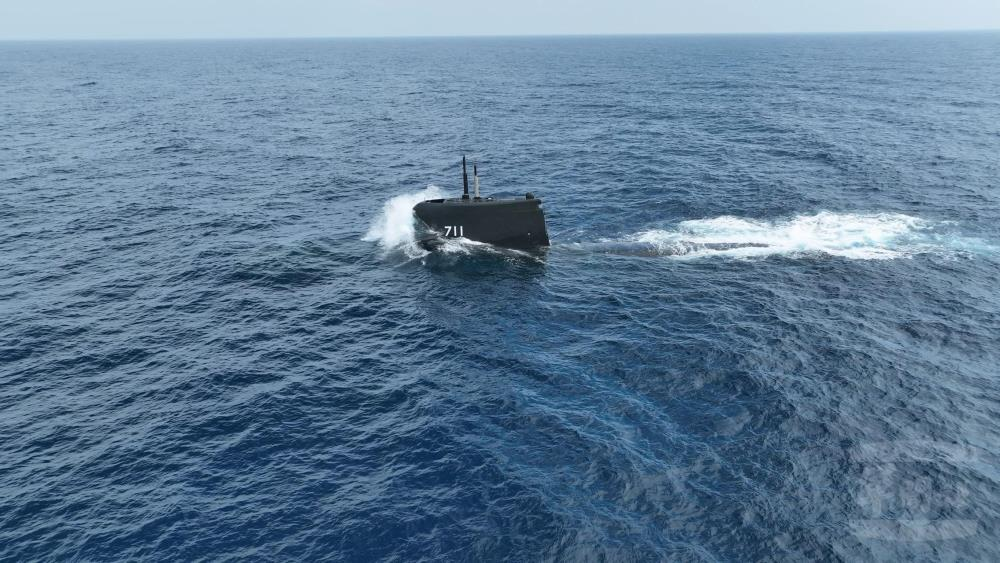
- Conduct shallow water submersible test of ROCS Hai Kun

Class overview
- Name: Hai Kun
- Builders: CSBC Corporation, Taiwan
- Operators: Republic of China Navy
- Preceded by: Hai Lung class
- Built: 2020–onward
- In commission: 2026
- Planned: 8
- Building: 1

General characteristics
- Type: Diesel-electric attack submarine
- Displacement: c. 2,500 t (2,500 long tons)
- Length: c. 70 m (229 ft 8 in)
- Propulsion: Diesel/electric (lithium-ion battery technology)
- Test depth: 350–420 m (1,150–1,380 ft)
- Armament: 6 × 533 mm (21 in) torpedo tubes; MK 48 Mod6 AT torpedoes; UGM-84L Harpoon missiles

The Hai Kun-class submarine (Chinese: 海鯤級潛艦; lit. 'narwhal'), alternatively known as the Indigenous Defense Submarine (IDS) program, is a class of attack submarines built by CSBC Corporation, Taiwan for the Republic of China Navy. While the Hai Kun class is thought to be based on the Dutch Zwaardvis class, which is currently operated by Taiwan, the design has been brought up to date by incorporating many new and more modern systems.

== History ==
Since 2001, Taiwan has been attempting to procure new submarines to bolster its aging underwater fleets, which consisted of two Dutch-built Hai Lung-class submarines from the 1980s and two US-built GUPPY-class submarines that saw action in the Second World War. In 2003, the US offered to provide the subs for Taiwan, but as the US has not been building diesel-powered submarines since the 1950s, and after an offer of eight refurbished Italian Nazario Sauro-class submarines was declined by Taiwan due to their age, the attempt to acquire foreign-built submarines was set aside in favor of domestic options.

The Ministry of National Defense announced in 2014 that Taiwan will construct its own diesel-electric attack submarines (SSKs) with help from the United States, and in 2016 a submarine development center was established by CSBC Corporation, Taiwan to oversee the Indigenous Defense Submarine program under the code name "Hai Chang" (Chinese: 海昌). In April 2018, President Donald Trump approved the technology transfers that would enable Taiwan to build its own submarines, and in the following years multiple design proposals from countries that reportedly includes India and Japan were considered.

== Design ==
In May 2019, Taiwan revealed a scale model of its chosen design for an indigenous built diesel-electric attack submarine. The boats will be assembled using Japanese construction techniques in Taiwan. A Japanese team consisting of retired engineers from Mitsubishi and Kawasaki Heavy Industries is believed to have provided technical support.

The design of the Hai Kun class is thought to be derived from the Dutch Zwaardvis class, which is currently operated by Taiwan, with some similarities to the Dutch Walrus class as well. The submarine features a hybrid double-single hull structure with a light outer hull, but replaces the cruciform control surfaces of the Zwaardvis class with the more prevalent X-form type rudders, resembling Japan's Sōryū-class and the Dutch Walrus-class SSKs. It does not feature air independent power (AIP) and is believed to lack anechoic coating. When it comes to speed, the submarine will likely reach a surface speed of 8 knots and a submerged speed of 17 knots. In addition, it has an expected range of up to 11,000 kilometers. The boats are estimated to weigh between 2,460 and 2,950 tons and be around 260 feet (79.25 m) in length. CSBC Corporation, Taiwan was awarded a contract to build eight submarines. The initial project contract is for US$3.3 billion with projected procurement costs of US$10bn for a fleet of ten boats. The first submarine of the class, Hai Kun, is estimated to have cost ~$1.54 billion dollars. Approximately 40% of the components are of domestic origin.

In October 2019 it was reported that construction of the class would commence at the Heping Island yard in Keelung (Northeast Taiwan) rather than in Kaohsiung (Southwest Taiwan). Later in October 2019 it was reported that personnel working on the project were forbidden from traveling to or transiting through Macao or Hong Kong (their travel to Mainland China had already been restricted) due to security concerns.

== Construction ==
In May 2020, the United States Department of State approved the sale of 18 MK-48 Mod6 Advanced Technology Heavy Weight Torpedoes and related equipment to Taiwan for an estimated cost of $180 million.

In November 2020, President Tsai Ing-wen opened the submarine construction facility in Kaohsiung (not Keelung) with plans to build eight submarines. Construction was to begin with a prototype boat which was to be built over 78 months. Anticipated delivery was in 2025, though a 78-month build time suggested a somewhat later delivery. Between December 2020 and February 2021, the United States reportedly approved the export of three key systems to Taiwan for the program: digital sonar systems, integrated combat systems and auxiliary equipment systems (periscopes).

In 2021 it was announced that the production timeline had been moved up with the prototype vessel expected to be launched in September 2023. The ceremonial keel laying of the lead boat was reported to have occurred in November 2021. In mid-2022 it was reported that the launch of the first submarine remained on track for September 2023. The date for service entry was still envisaged as 2025.

In November 2021 Reuters reported that Taiwan had recruited engineers and retired submariners from the US, UK, Australia, South Korea, India, Spain and Canada to work on the program and advise the navy.

The UK government has granted licenses to companies to export some £167 million worth of submarine technology and parts to Taiwan, more than the prior six years of investment since 2017 combined. Current and former UK officials have warned against disclosing specific information about support given to Taiwan publicly.

In May 2023 CSBC Corp. announced that the prototype would undergo final tests in September of that year.

On 21 September 2023, the launch date was confirmed to be 28 September 2023, and the name of the first boat and hull number were announced. The first boat will be named Hai Kun, after a mythological fish mentioned in the ancient Chinese text Zhuangzi, written during the Warring States period by Zhuang Zhou, which was described as being of an unfathomable size. The hull number was given as SS-711, as the existing numbers remaining if continued from the Hai Lung-class's Hai Hu (SS-794) would not accommodate the planned eight boats. After launch harbor acceptance trials will start on 1 October 2023 and preliminary evaluations are expected to be completed by 1 April 2024.

Following the launch, Kuomintang politician Ma Wen-chun was publicly accused of attempting to hinder Taiwan's domestic submarine program through outing foreign individuals involved in the program and through providing information on the program to the People's Republic of China. Following comments by the head of the submarine program about an unspecified legislator who had interfered with the program Ma posted on Facebook "If you name me, I'll have to sue you" following which she was named by her legislative colleagues.

According to a report by a Ma Wen-Chun to the Korean Mission in Taipei on 3 January 2024, former Daewoo Shipbuilding & Marine Engineering's (DSME) submarine designers, who are under investigation by South Korean police for leaking design drawings of Korean DSME-1400 submarines to Taiwan, are participating in submarine development after signing a contract with CSBC. On 26 December 2025, a South Korean court sentenced former DSME employees to two and a half years in prison after they were found to have illegally leaked submarine torpedo tube and storage design drawings designated as South Korea's national strategic material to Taiwan and used them to develop a Hai Kun-class submarine.

In February 2024 it was reported that the Hai Kun is set to undergo a crucial phase of its harbor acceptance tests. During its harbor acceptance tests no issues were found in regards to the submarine's ability to submerge and surface.

In May 2024 it was reported that the delivery of the optronic masts destined for the Hai Kun submarine were facing delay.

In 2024 it was estimated that the seven submarines that are planned to be built in batches after the Hai Kun will cost around 8.74 billion US dollars.

In June 2025 Hai Kun performed sea trials in the Port of Kaohsiung. During these trials it performed autonomous movement under its own power and also tested energy, communication and ventilation systems. The Hai Kun will also submerge several times at increasing depths to perform shallow depth testing and gradual depth increase testing.

On 26 June, the submarine suffered a hydraulic failure while undergoing its second sea trials. Hence, the rudder of the boat was left inoperable which meant the submarine could only continue straight ahead. Since the issue could not be solved in the sea, a team of personnel took turns to manually move rudder control levers in the stern steering gear room in order to maneuver the submarine back to port. Two tugboats accompanying the submarine controlled the bow to prevent collisions.

On 25 January 2026, Hai Kun sailed out from Kaohsiung Harbor for its sixth sea acceptance test. The fifth series of tests were concluded on 28 November last year and has been conducting surface-only tests. The November timeline for delivery has already been missed. On 29 January, Hai Kun successfully completed its first submerged sea trials.

Four rounds of diving tests were conducted by 6 February while the fifth dive was conducted on 11 March after departing the Port of Kaohsiung at 8 a.m. local time. There multiple delays from the project deadline of November 2025 as well as fines on Shipbuilder CSBC Corp., Taiwan. The company aims to deliver the submarine in June 2026.

== Boats ==
Name	Hull number	Builder	Laid down	Launched	Commissioned	Status
Hai Kun (海鯤)	SS-711	CSBC, Kaohsiung	16 November 2021	28 September 2023	TBC	In sea trial

== See also ==
- Defense industry of Taiwan
- List of submarine classes in service

Equivalent submarines of the same era

- Dolphin II class
- Lada class
- Type 218SG
- S-80 Plus class
- Blekinge class
