= Crash dive =

Expedited submersion of a submarine

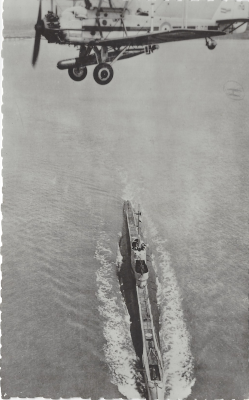

A crash dive is a maneuver by a submarine in which the vessel submerges as quickly as possible to avoid attack. Crash diving from the surface to avoid attack has been largely rendered obsolete with the advent of nuclear-powered submarines, as they normally operate submerged. However, the crash dive is also a standard maneuver to avoid a collision.

A crash dive in a diesel-powered submarine requires careful orchestration of the crew. On German U-boats of World War II, a crash dive began with the Captain or senior lookouts giving the order "Alarm!" which led to a bridge officer activating the alarm bell. All crew members then immediately stopped what they were doing and proceeded to their diving stations. Once the lookouts were below deck and the upper deck hatch was secured, the Captain or Chief Engineer shouted the order, "Fluten" ("flood the tanks"). With the bow planes at a maximum down angle, the crew then flooded the forward ballast tanks. Often, all available crew members moved as far forward in the boat as practical (a "trim party"). This extra weight forward gave the boat a bow-down angle so its momentum helped pull it below the surface. A few seconds later, the crew would flood the rear ballast tanks to prevent the bow-down angle from lifting the boat's stern out of the water. (Note: An accident during the first patrol of U-505 caused just that when she crash dived to avoid an aircraft. Fortunately for the crew, the boat was not spotted during the moments before the crew could regain full control. The crewman who delayed in flooding the rear ballast tanks was subsequently given the nickname "Ostrich," a reference to the popular myth that the ostrich, when frightened, buries its head in the sand and thereby raises the position of its tail relative to its body.) The entire crash dive was generally coordinated by the chief engineer.

Before hatches and air induction vents fall below the surface they must be closed. Before that, the diesel engines must be stopped or they will suck the air out of the boat in a matter of seconds. On submarines with direct drive, the crew disengages the diesel engines from the propeller shafts and switches to electric motor propulsion. The motors run at high speed to maintain the forward momentum. Once all hatches and induction vents are closed, the diving planes (like the control surfaces of an airplane) pull the boat below the surface and level it out at the desired depth—typically between 70 and 90 metres (230 and 300 ft). In a World War II-era boat, the whole operation could take as little as 30 seconds with a well-trained crew. In contrast, an Ohio-class ballistic-missile submarine may take as long as five minutes to reach periscope depth from the surface. However, it is capable of doing so faster if required; the smaller, more agile attack submarines can dive quite rapidly. The crash diving rate of a missile submarine is also not relevant since it can stay submerged for very long periods of time, and is not expected to ever cruise on the surface when in range of enemy units of any type. A WWII era submarine (technically a submersible since it is only capable of diving for limited periods of time) is by design forced to spend much of its time on the surface, and therefore needs to be able to "escape" by diving when an enemy is spotted.

In extreme emergencies, submarines have had to crash dive so quickly that lookouts were left on deck. Such was the only survivor of U-68 when the four lookouts were left top-side as she crash dived among exploding aerial bombs. Commander Howard Gilmore earned the Medal of Honor posthumously during World War II by ordering a crash dive ("Take her down!") while wounded and unable to leave the bridge of USS Growler (SS-215).

== See also ==
- Emergency main ballast tank blow
