= Walrus-class submarine (1953) =

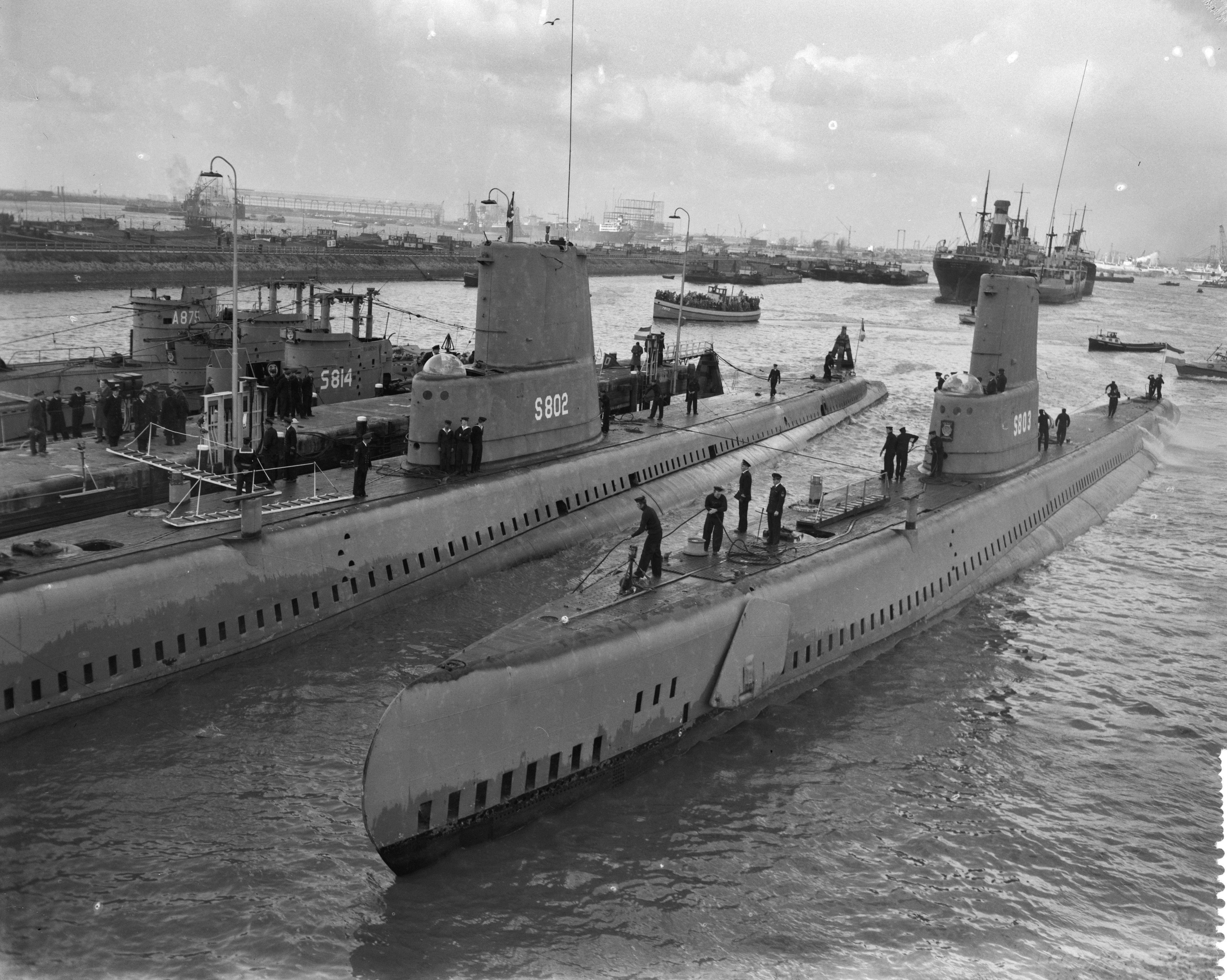
- Walrus and Zeeleeuw

Class overview
- Name: Walrus class
- Builders: Manitowoc Shipbuilding Company, Manitowoc
- Operators: Royal Netherlands Navy
- Succeeded by: Zwaardvis class
- In service: 1953–1971

General characteristics
- Type: Diesel-electric Submarine
- Displacement: 1,840 t (1,810 long tons) surfaced; 2,425 t (2,387 long tons) submerged
- Length: 93.6 m (307 ft 1 in)
- Beam: 8.3 m (27 ft 3 in)
- Draft: 4.6 metres (15 ft 1 in)
- Propulsion: 2 propellers; 6,500 hp (4,800 kW) surfaced; 2,700 hp (2,000 kW) submerged; 4 x GMC diesel engines
- Speed: 19 knots (35 km/h; 22 mph) surfaced; 12 knots (22 km/h; 14 mph) submerged
- Crew: 79
- Armament: 10 x 53.3 cm torpedo tubes; 24 torpedoes

The Walrus class was a class of two submarines that served between 1953 and 1971 in the Royal Netherlands Navy. They were former Balao class submarines that were loaned to the Netherlands by the United States under the Mutual Defense Assistance Program (MDAP).

== Background ==
After the Second World War the Royal Netherlands Navy (RNN) was left with several old and obsolete submarines. While the RNN made several plans to modernize the submarine fleet, it took many years till these plans resulted in the construction and commissioning of new submarines. In the meanwhile the RNN tried to loan some of the surplus submarines that allies such as the United Kingdom and United States (US) had. In the early 1950s this led to the US loaning two submarines to the Netherlands under the Mutual Defense Assistance Program (MDAP), which together would later form the Walrus class. Initially the US agreed to loan the two submarines for a duration of five years, however, this was extended twice with five years.

== Design and construction ==
The two submarines of the Walrus class were built in the US by the Manitowoc Shipbuilding Company. They were originally Balao class submarines that had served in the United States Navy (USN). Before both submarines were transferred from the USN to the RNN they had undergone an extensive modernization known as Greater Underwater Propulsion Power Program (GUPPY).

=== Propulsion ===
Both Walrus class submarines were equipped with four 16 cylinder two-stroke GMC diesel engines that were capable of delivering around 6500 hp when surfaced and 2700 hp when submerged. This allowed the two submarines to reach a speed of 19 kn when surfaced and 12 kn when submerged. Furthermore, they each had two propellers and two 126 cells batteries. The batteries had a capacity of 10.500 Ah and allowed the Walrus class submarines to operate solely on electric power for 5 hours.

=== Armaments ===
When it came to armaments both submarines were equipped with a total of ten 53.3 cm torpedo tubes of which six were located at the front and four at the rear. In addition, there was enough room to store 24 torpedoes inside the submarines.

== Service history ==
In the early 1960s the Walrus class submarines patrolled the waters in Dutch New Guinea and were stationed at Manokwari and Biak.

== Ships in class ==
Walrus class data
Ship	Pennant No.	Commissioned	Fate
Walrus	S802	21 February 1953	Returned to the United States Navy on 23 July 1971.
Zeeleeuw	S803	21 April 1953	Returned to the United States Navy on 3 April 1970 and later sold to Trans Trading N.V. on 24 November 1970 for 313.013 Dutch guilders.
