= Barbel-class submarine =

Last class of diesel-electric submarine operated by US Navy

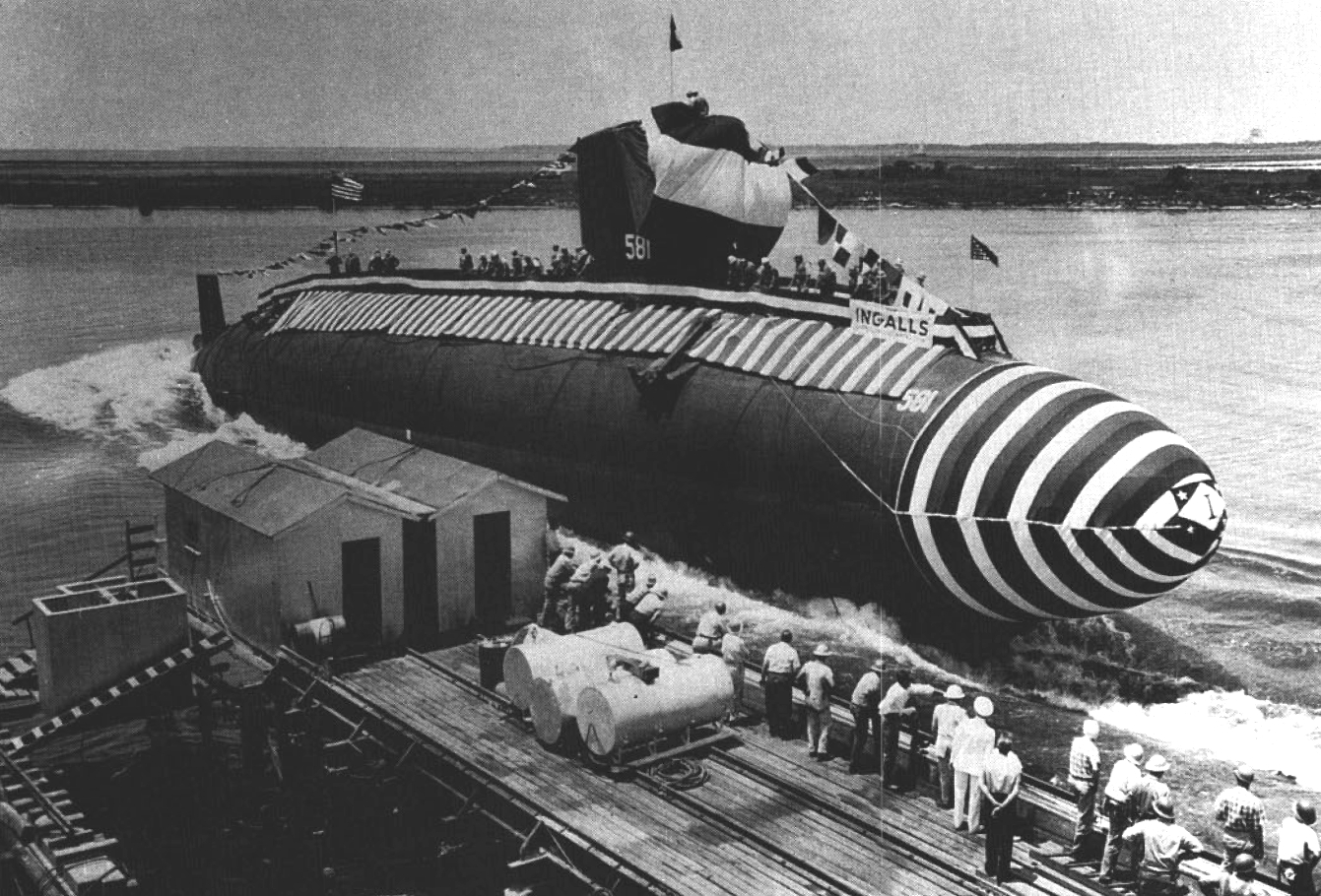
- The launch of USS Blueback in 1959

Class overview
- Name: Barbel class
- Builders: Portsmouth Naval Shipyard, Kittery, Maine; Ingalls Shipbuilding, Pascagoula, Mississippi; New York Shipbuilding, Camden, New Jersey
- Operators: United States Navy
- Preceded by: USS Darter
- Built: 1956–1959
- In commission: 1959–1990
- Completed: 3
- Retired: 3
- Preserved: 1

General characteristics
- Type: Attack submarine
- Displacement: 1,750 long tons (1,780 t) light; 2,146 long tons (2,180 t) full; 2,637 long tons (2,679 t) submerged; 402 DWT
- Length: 219 ft 2 in (66.80 m) overall
- Beam: 29 ft (8.8 m)
- Draft: 29 ft (8.8 m) max
- Propulsion: 3 × Fairbanks-Morse Diesel engines (total 3,150 shp (2,350 kW)), 2 × General Electric electric motors (total 4,700 shp (3,500 kW)), 4 × 126-cell GUPPY IA batteries, one shaft
- Speed: 14 knots (26 km/h; 16 mph) surfaced, 12 knots (22 km/h; 14 mph) snorkeling, 18.5 knots (34.3 km/h; 21.3 mph) submerged
- Range: 14,000 nautical miles (26,000 km) surfaced at 10 knots (19 km/h)
- Endurance: 90 minutes at full speed submerged, 102 hours at 3 knots (5.6 km/h) submerged
- Test depth: 700 ft (210 m)
- Complement: 8 officers, 69 enlisted
- Sensors & processing systems: BQS-4 active sonar; BQR-2 passive sonar; MK 101 fire control system
- Armament: 6 × 21-inch (533 mm) bow torpedo tubes, 22 torpedoes

The Barbel-class submarines, the last diesel-electric propelled attack submarines built by the United States Navy, incorporated numerous, radical engineering improvements over previous classes. They were the first production warships built with the teardrop-shape hull first tested on the experimental USS Albacore, and the first to combine the control room, attack center, and conning tower in the same space in the hull. They were of double hull design with 1.5-inch thick HY80 steel. This class of submarine became part of the United States Navy's fleet in 1959 and was taken out of service 1988–1990, leaving the Navy with an entirely nuclear-powered submarine fleet.

The Barbel class' design is considered to be very effective. The Zwaardvis-class submarines of the Netherlands and the Hai Lung class of the Republic of China (designed and built in the Netherlands) were closely derived from the Barbel class design. The Japanese Uzushio class and its successors were also influenced by the Barbel class.

== Design ==
Designed under project SCB 150, the class overall was a somewhat smaller diesel-powered version of the Skipjack-class nuclear submarines, the first of which entered service only three months after Barbel, having been laid down only 11 days later. Several features of the experimental Albacore were used in the Barbel-class design, most obviously the fully streamlined "teardrop" hull. Albacore's single-shaft configuration, necessary to minimize drag and thus maximize speed, was also adopted for the Barbels, Skipjacks, and all subsequent US nuclear submarines. This was a matter of considerable debate and analysis within the Navy, as two shafts offered redundancy and improved maneuverability. For the first time, the Barbels also did away with the conning tower, instead combining the functions of attack center and control room into the same space, another feature adopted for all subsequent US submarines. This was facilitated by the adoption of "push-button" ballast control, another feature of Albacore. Previous designs had routed the trim system piping through the control room, where the valves were manually operated. The "push-button" system used hydraulic operators on each valve, remotely electrically operated (actually via toggle switches) from the control room. This greatly conserved control room space and reduced the time required to conduct trim operations. The overall layout made coordination of the weapons and ship control systems easier during combat operations.

The torpedo tube arrangement of the Barbels was the same as the Skipjacks', with six bow tubes in a three-over-three configuration. These (and the Skipjack-derived George Washington-class SSBNs) were the only US Navy classes to have this configuration, as subsequent SSN designs used four angled midships torpedo tubes to make room for a large bow sonar sphere, and most SSBNs had four bow tubes.

The Barbels were built with bow mounted diving planes, but these were replaced by sail planes (aka fairwater planes) within a few years. This feature was standard on US Navy submarines until bow planes returned with the improved Los Angeles class, the first of which was launched in 1987.

== Boats in class ==
Name	Hull number	Builder	Laid Down	Launched	Commissioned	Decommissioned	Period of service	Fate
Barbel	SS-580	Portsmouth Naval Shipyard	18 May 1956	19 July 1958	17 January 1959	4 December 1989	30.9	Decommissioned 4 December 1989, scrapping delayed due to asbestos insulation, expended as a target 30 January 2001
Blueback	SS-581	Ingalls Shipbuilding, Pascagoula, Mississippi	15 April 1957	16 May 1959	15 October 1959	1 October 1990	30.9	Decommissioned 1 October 1990, museum ship at the Oregon Museum of Science and Industry in Portland, Oregon from 1994.
Bonefish	SS-582	New York Shipbuilding, Camden, New Jersey	3 June 1957	22 November 1958	9 July 1959	28 September 1988	29.3	Not repaired following a fire that killed three on 24 April 1988, hulked 17 August 1989, hull acquired for tests by Northrop Grumman.

== See also ==
Equivalent submarines of the same era

- Romeo class
- Dolfijn class
- Foxtrot class
- Oberon class
- Narval class
