= HNLMS Tijgerhaai (S807) =

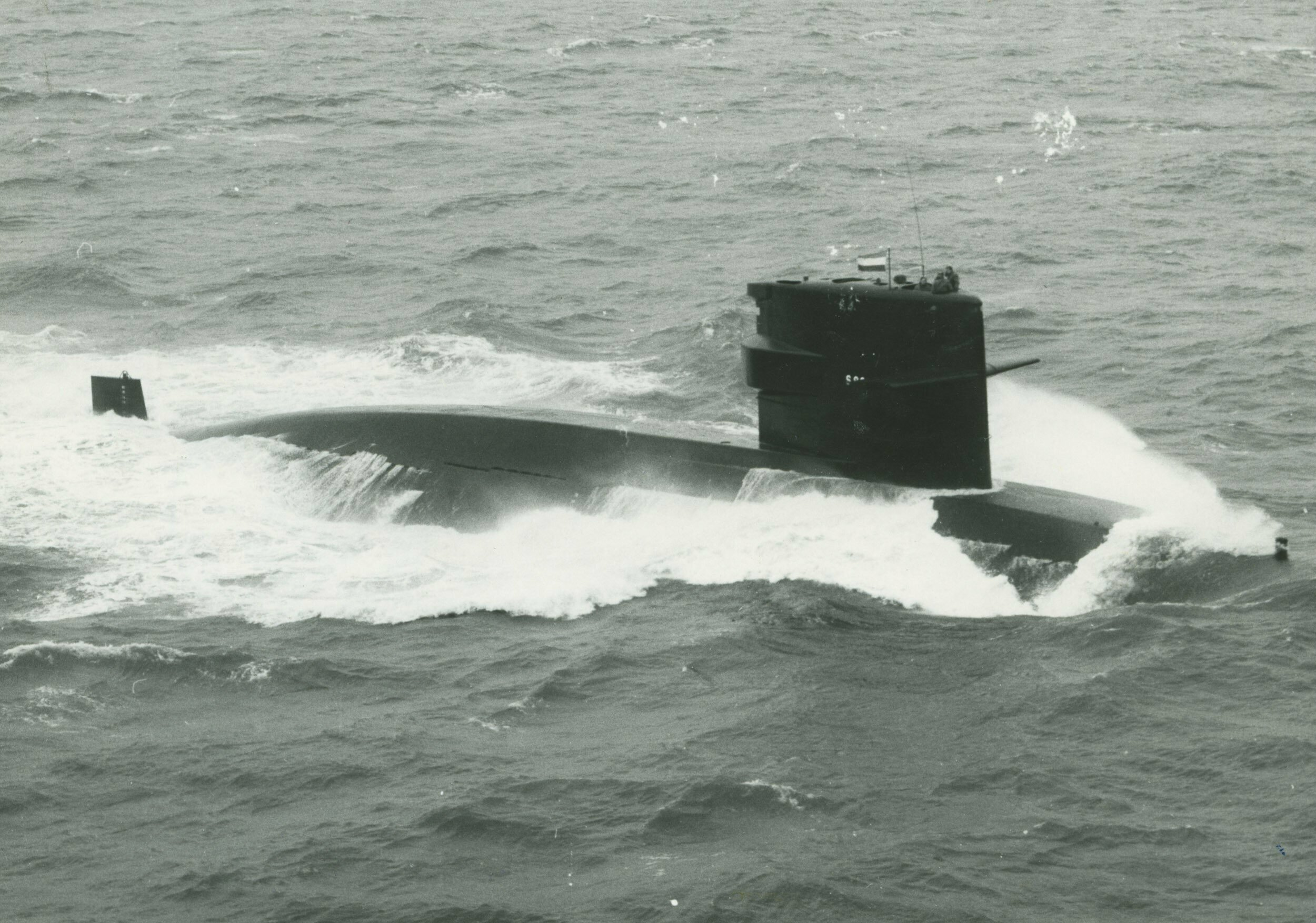
- HNLMS Tijgerhaai, 1972

History

Netherlands
- Name: Tijgerhaai
- Namesake: Tiger shark
- Builder: Rotterdamsche Droogdok Maatschappij, Rotterdam
- Yard number: RDM-321
- Laid down: 14 July 1966
- Launched: 25 May 1971
- Commissioned: 20 October 1972
- Decommissioned: 1996
- Identification: S 807
- Motto: Seeks the fight, well prepared
- Fate: Scrapped, 2006

General characteristics
- Class & type: Zwaardvis-class submarine
- Displacement: 2350 tons surfaced; 2620 tons submerged
- Length: 66.92 m (219 ft 7 in)
- Beam: 8.4 m (27 ft 7 in)
- Draught: 7.1 m (23 ft 4 in)
- Propulsion: 3 × diesel engines 4,200 shp (3,132 kW); 1 × 5,100 shp (3,803 kW) electric motor
- Speed: 13 kn (24 km/h; 15 mph) surfaced; 20 kn (37 km/h; 23 mph) submerged
- Complement: 65-67
- Armament: 6 × 21 in (533 mm) bow torpedo tubes

HNLMS Tijgerhaai (S807) (Dutch pronunciation: [ˈtɛiɣərˌɦaːi]; English: Tiger shark) was a Zwaardvis-class submarine of the Royal Netherlands Navy.

== Ship history ==
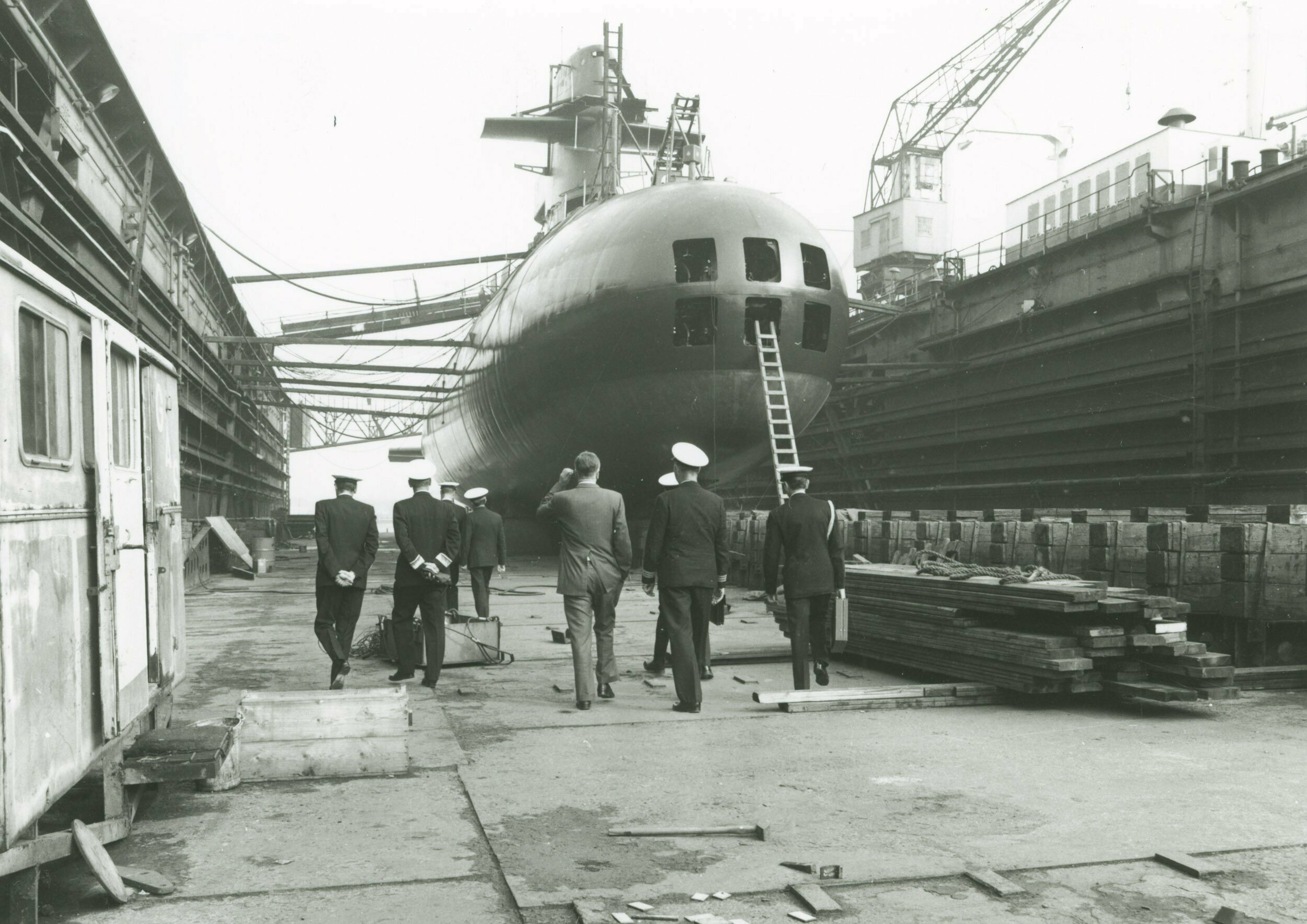
The Tijgerhaai during her final completion between 1971-1972.

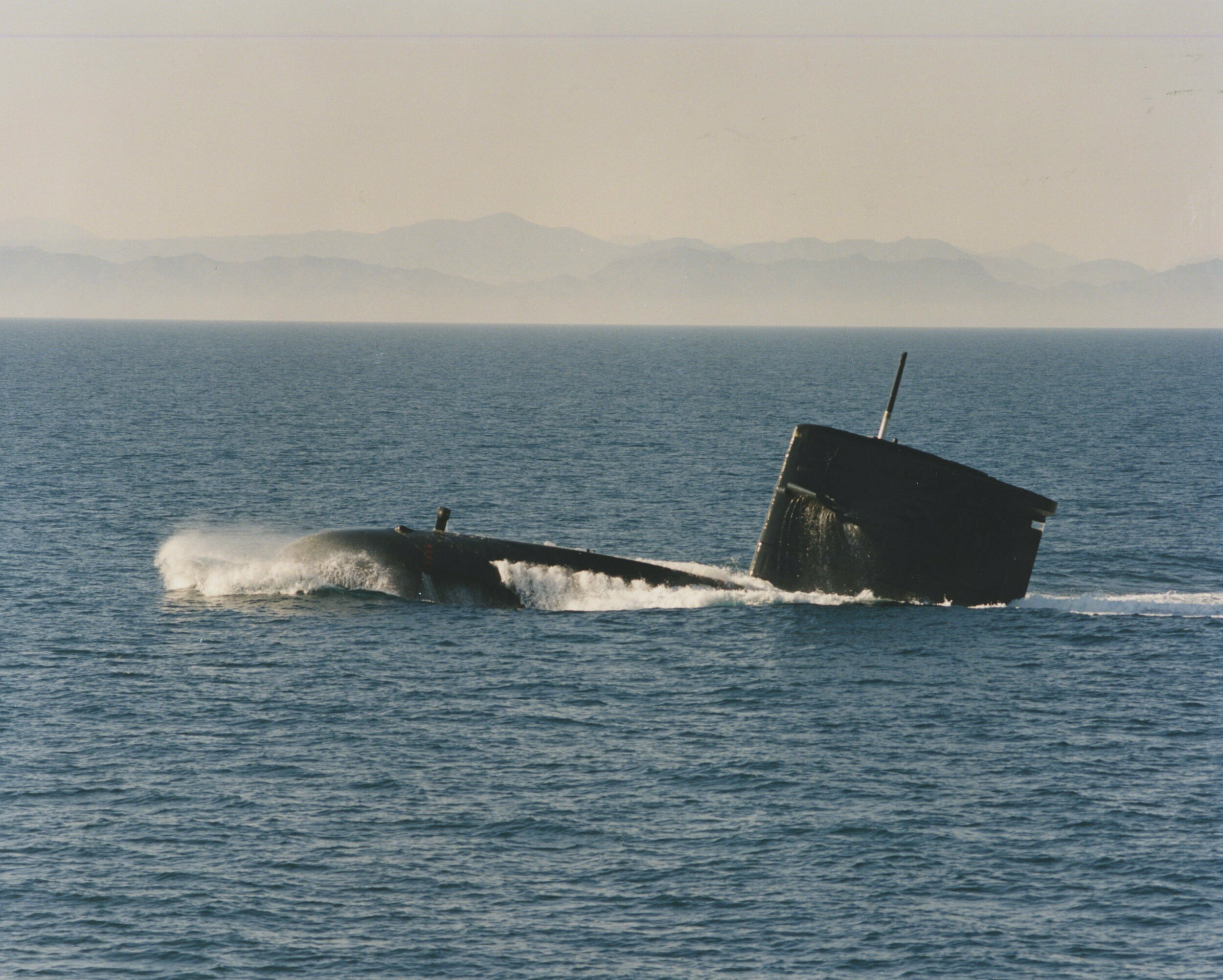
Tijgerhaai comes to surface

The submarine was ordered 24 December 1965 and laid down on 14 July 1966 at the Rotterdamse Droogdok Mij shipyard in Rotterdam. She was launched on 25 May 1971. 20 October 1972 she was commissioned in the Dutch navy.

In November 1972 Tijgerhaai, Dolfijn and air units of the Dutch navy took part in an exercise. In 1990 the boat made a visit to Scotland. The following year she made a visits to Norway and Scotland. The boat took part in an exercise called TFX in 1993. In 1993 the boat also made a trip to the United Kingdom and Ireland and a trip to the Mediterranean Sea.

In 1994 Tijgerhaai took part in the NATO exercise Isle d'or. Other exercises that year include an exercise called Jolly Roger, an exercise with German submarines and an exercise with English vessels. The boat was decommissioned in 1996. Several countries expressed interest in buying the submarine but eventually no buyer was found. The Tijgerhaai was scrapped in Malaysia in 2006.
