= Hai Lung-class submarine =

Class of Taiwanese submarines

Class overview
- Name: Hai Lung or Chien Lung
- Builders: Wilton-Fijenoord
- Operators: Republic of China Navy
- Succeeded by: Hai Kun class
- Built: 1982–1986
- In commission: 1987–present
- Planned: 2
- Completed: 2
- Active: 2

General characteristics
- Type: Diesel-electric attack submarine
- Displacement: 2376 t (surfaced); 2660 t (submerged)
- Length: 66.9 m (219 ft 6 in)
- Beam: 8.4 m (27 ft 7 in)
- Draught: 6.7 m (22 ft 0 in)
- Propulsion: 3 × Bronswerk/Stork-Werkspoor RUB 215x12 diesels; 4050 hp
- Speed: 20 knots (37 km/h; 23 mph) (submerged); 12 knots (22 km/h; 14 mph) (surfaced)
- Test depth: 300 m (980 ft)
- Complement: 67 (8 officers)
- Sensors & processing systems: Type 1001 radar; Sonar Elodone Octopus, Type 20026 towed array, DUUX-5; Elbit TIMNEX 4CH(V2) electronic support measures (ESM) system
- Armament: 6 × 21 in (533 mm) torpedo tubes; 28 torpedoes/missiles; AEG SUT 264 torpedo (dual purpose - wire-guided, active/passive homing); Mark 48 torpedo; UGM-84 Harpoon (2014)

The Hai Lung (Sea Dragon) class of submarines, also known as the Chien Lung (Chinese: 劍龍) class, was manufactured in the Netherlands for Taiwan and is currently in service with its navy. They are a modified version of the Dutch Navy's Zwaardvis class which itself is based on the US Barbel class. A new class of submarines being built by Taiwan's Indigenous Defense Submarine program, will eventually replace them.

== History ==
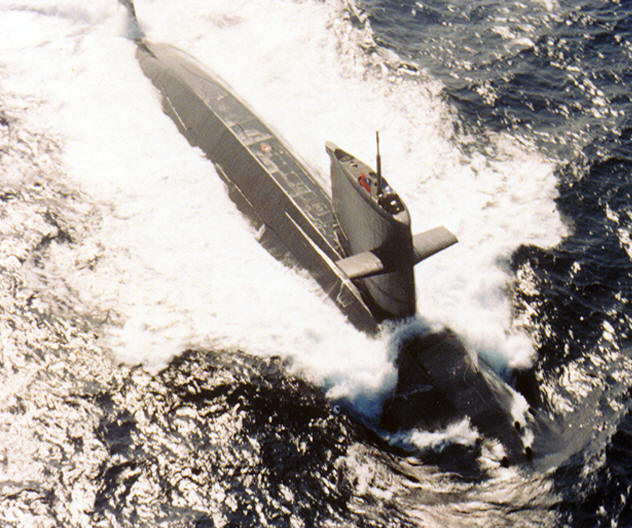
ROCS Hai Lung (SS-793).

The Republic of China (Taiwan) ordered two submarines, each based on the Dutch Zwaardvis design, in September 1981. The keels for both submarines were laid down by dock and yard company Wilton Fijenoord b.v Schiedam in December 1982, though initial construction of the submarines was delayed due to the builder's financial instability, work resumed in 1983. Both submarines were launched in 1986, Hai Lung on October 6 and Hai Hu on December 10. Sea trials for Hai Lung began in March 1987 and Hai Hu began its sea trials in January 1988. Both boats were transported to Taiwan on board a heavy dock vessel. Hai Hu was commissioned for service on October 9, 1987, and Hai Lung followed on April 9, 1988. The deal for the submarines also included power station components and gas liquifaction plants.

More boats in this class were planned, and in October 1983 the Dutch government held talks with Taiwan in which the ordering of two extra submarines was discussed. The order worth ƒ800 million was to be paid for 50% by investments of Taiwan in the Netherlands in the form of civil orders. However, the deal fell through after mainland China pressured the Dutch government. An order for four more submarines was also turned down by the Netherlands government in 1992 after China downgraded diplomatic ties with the Dutch.

== Design ==
The Hai Lung-class submarines are based on an improved Zwaardvis-class design. This means that they also make use of the US Navy's teardrop hull design, which was used by the Barbel class of conventional submarines. The design was modified to include the placement of noise-producing machinery on a false deck with spring suspension for silent running. As built the class featured an Elbit TIMNEX 4CH(V2) electronic support measures (ESM) system.

== Tasks ==
The Hai Lung-class submarines are aimed at providing Taiwan the capability to deter Chinese naval blockades and to ensure that its sea lanes remain open, thus protecting the trade on which the island depends. In addition, both submarines could be used to block Chinese ports but are unlikely to be capable of countering China's submarine fleet.

== Upgrades and modifications ==
In 2005, it was reported that the Hai Lung class would be upgraded to be capable of launching the UGM-84 Harpoon anti-ship missile. US DoD notified the United States Congress of the sale to Taiwan of 32 UGM-84 Harpoon Block II missiles, along with two weapon control systems, other associated equipment and services, in 2008. The delivery of the Harpoon anti-ship missiles started in 2013 and was completed in 2016. The upgrade allows the Hai Lung-class submarines to be able to attack targets from the sea, such as the Port of Shanghai, as well as nuclear submarines at the secret naval base in Yulin on the island of Hainan. The Harpoon missiles have a range of about 125 kilometers (78 mi). The submarines can now attack targets both at sea and on land with Harpoon missiles.

In April 2016 it was announced that the Hai Lung class submarines will be modernized. It was estimated at the time that the cost of upgrading the two boats will be 12.35 million dollars. In 2018 the modernization program was green-lit by RH Marine after a year long technical feasibility study. The aim of the modernization is to extend the operational lifespan of both submarines into the late 2030s. This will be done by upgrading many parts of the submarines, including the electronic warfare and combat systems, hull, electrical systems, mechanics and non-propulsion electronic systems. Besides upgrades, the boats will also be equipped with long-range heavy Mark 48 torpedoes. The modernization of the submarines is expected to take place between 2020 and 2022.

In August 2026 it was reported that the modernization of the Hai Lung-class submarines are nearly finished. The upgrades, which started in 2018 and cost 234.2 million US Dollars, includes the installation of a new combat system to replace the original Dutch-made systems. In addition, the sonar, guidance radar systems and electronic support measures of the submarines will also be improved.

== Boats ==
Name	Hull number	Builder	Laid down	Launched	Commissioned
Hai Lung (Sea Dragon)	SS-793	Wilton-Fijenoord	15 December 1982	6 October 1986	9 October 1987
Hai Hu (Sea Tiger)	SS-794	Wilton-Fijenoord	December 1982	10 December 1986	9 April 1988

== See also ==
- List of submarine classes in service

Equivalent submarines of the same era

- Walrus class
- Santa Cruz class
- Sindhughosh class
- Harushio class
- Upholder/Victoria class

== Notes ==
=== Bibliography ===
- Darman, Peter, ed. (2004). Twenty-first Century Submarines and Warships. Military Handbooks. Rochester: Grange Books. ISBN 1-84013-678-2.
- Edmonds, Martin; Tsai, Michael M., eds. (2003). Defending Taiwan: The future vision of Taiwan's defence policy and military strategy. Abingdon, Oxon: Routledge. ISBN 0-7007-1739-0.
- Edmonds, Martin; Tsai, Michael M., eds. (2005). Taiwan's Maritime Security. New York: Taylor & Francis. ISBN 0-203-98674-1.
- Tsang, Steve, ed. (2004). Peace and Security Across the Taiwan Strait. New York: Palgrave Macmillan. ISBN 1-4039-3519-X.
