= Moray-class submarine =

Proposed submarine class

Class overview
- Name: Moray class
- Builders: Rotterdamsche Droogdok Maatschappij, Rotterdam
- Preceded by: Zwaardvis class
- Cost: ƒ220 million per unit (1989)
- Planned: 2
- Canceled: 2

General characteristics
- Type: Submarine
- Displacement: 1,100 t (1,083 long tons); 1,400 t (1,378 long tons); 1,800 t (1,772 long tons)
- Length: 55.7 m (182 ft 9 in); 64 m (210 ft 0 in); 75.9 m (249 ft 0 in)
- Beam: 6.4 m (21 ft 0 in)
- Draft: 5.5 m (18 ft 1 in)
- Propulsion: Diesel-electric; Air-independent propulsion (AIP)
- Speed: 20 knots (37 km/h; 23 mph)
- Endurance: 65 days
- Test depth: >300 m (980 ft)
- Crew: 26 to 41
- Armament: 6 × 533 mm (21 in) torpedo tubes

Moray (Note: The name Moray stood for Multi Operational Requirements Affected Yield.) was the name of a proposed new class of submarines developed by the Rotterdamsche Droogdok Maatschappij (RDM). While a Moray class submarine was never actually built, the detailed design of the submarine class was fully completed.

== Design ==
A Moray-class submarine could be built in several sizes depending on the type of submarine that was needed. For smaller submarines that would patrol off the coast, there was a design that ranged from 1,100 tons to 1,400 tons displacement, whereas oceangoing submarines ranged from 1,800 tons to potentially 2,000 tons displacement. Besides customization, RDM also offered three standard types of Moray-class submarines which were called the 1100, 1400 and 1800. The number stood for roughly the amount of tonnage of the submarine. The three types had a length of 55.7 meters (182 ft 9 in) (1100), 64 m (210 ft 0 in) (1400) and 75.9 m (249 ft 0 in) (1800), while the beam was 6.4 m (21 ft 0 in) and the draft 5.5 m (18 ft 1 in). The smallest submarine, the 1100, had space for a crew of 26. The 1800 had space for a crew of 41.

While the Moray class was derived from the Walrus class, it had several differences with that class. The main difference was that the size of a Moray-class submarine was significantly smaller than a submarine of the Walrus class, which displaced around 2,800 tons. Another difference was that the hull of the Moray class was, unlike both the Zwaardvis and Walrus-class submarines, not in the shape of a tear drop. The more straight-lined hull of the Moray class made it possible to extend or shorten the submarine. It also allowed the insertion of a hull section that included an air-independent propulsion (AIP) system. The insertion of the AIP module would increase the tonnage of the submarine by 200 tons. A submarine of the Moray class could also dive less deep than a Walrus-class submarine. The Moray-class submarines had an estimated diving depth of more than 300 m (980 ft). The Moray 1800 had the same amount of battery cells as the Walrus-class submarines and an endurance of 65 days. When it comes to armaments, the Moray class was equipped with six 533 mm (21 in) torpedo tubes that could launch a variety of weapons, such as Mark 48 torpedoes and Harpoon missiles.

The price of a Moray-class submarine was estimated to cost around 220 million Dutch guilders in 1989.

=== Electric Moray 1800 ===
In June 2018, a concept of a fully electric submarine based on the Moray 1800 design was presented at the submarine symposium UDT in Glasgow. In the revealed concept, the diesel engines and all related equipment were removed from the Moray 1800 design together with the lead-acid batteries; these components were instead replaced with lithium batteries. The lithium batteries allowed the 1,800-ton submarine to stay at sea for three weeks before needing to return to recharge its batteries. In addition, there were several advantages and disadvantages to using only lithium batteries to power a submarine.

== See also ==
=== Submarines of similar era and comparison ===
- Viking-class submarine
