= USS Barbel (SS-580) =

Submarine of the United States

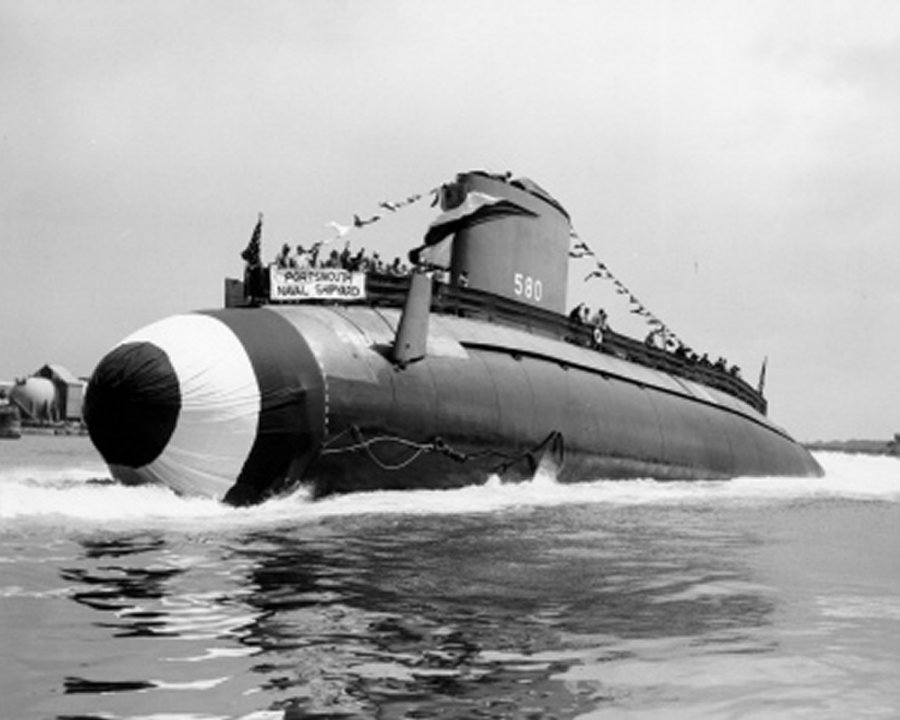
- Launching of Barbel on 19 July 1958

History

United States
- Name: USS Barbel
- Ordered: 24 August 1955
- Builder: Portsmouth Naval Shipyard, Kittery, Maine
- Laid down: 18 May 1956
- Launched: 19 July 1958
- Commissioned: 17 January 1959
- Decommissioned: 4 December 1989
- Stricken: 17 January 1990
- Fate: Sunk as a target 30 January 2001

General characteristics
- Class & type: Barbel-class diesel-electric submarine
- Displacement: 1,744 tons (1,778 t) light; 2,146 tons (2,180 t) full; 2,637 tons (2,679 t) submerged; 402 tons (408 t) dead
- Length: 219 ft 6 in (66.90 m) overall
- Beam: 29 ft (8.8 m)
- Draft: 25 ft (7.6 m) max
- Propulsion: 3 × Fairbanks-Morse diesel engines, total 3,150 bhp (2.3 MW); 2 × General Electric electric motors, total 4,800 bhp (3.6 MW); one screw
- Speed: 12 knots (22 km/h) surfaced; 25 knots (46 km/h) submerged
- Endurance: 30 minutes at full speed; 102 hours at 3 knots
- Test depth: 712 ft (217 m) operating; 1,050 ft (320 m) collapse
- Complement: 10 officers, 69 men
- Armament: 6 × 21 inch (533 mm) bow torpedo tubes, 18 torpedoes

USS Barbel (SS-580) was the lead ship of her class of submarines in the United States Navy. She was the second Navy ship named for the barbel, a cyprinoid fish, commonly called a minnow or carp.

The contract to build Barbel was awarded to Portsmouth Naval Shipyard in Kittery, Maine on 24 August 1955 and her keel was laid down on 18 May 1956. She was launched on 19 July 1958 sponsored by Mrs. Bernard L. Austin, and commissioned on 17 January 1959, with Lieutenant Commander Ord Kimzey, Jr., in command.

== 1950s and 1960s ==
Barbel-class submarines were originally designed and built with bow planes. On 30 November 1960, the Barbel had been operating off the coast of the Eastern U.S. while participating in training exercise SLAMEX. Following her first dive of the day to test depth (700 feet), she ruptured a 5" line used for cooling equipment which circulated sea water throughout the boat at sea pressure. An emergency blow was performed and on reaching the surface it was found that she had taken on 350 long tons (360 t) of water in the engine room. See USS Thresher (SSN-593)#Cause for more on silver brazing joint failures. She entered Portsmouth Naval Shipyard and underwent major repairs of all her piping over 2". At that time, her bow planes were also converted to fairwater planes.

In 1966 Barbel accidentally rammed and sank North Vietnam's largest freighter while trying to determine what type of war-related cargo it was carrying. Although damaged, Barbel was able to remain submerged and return to port for repairs.

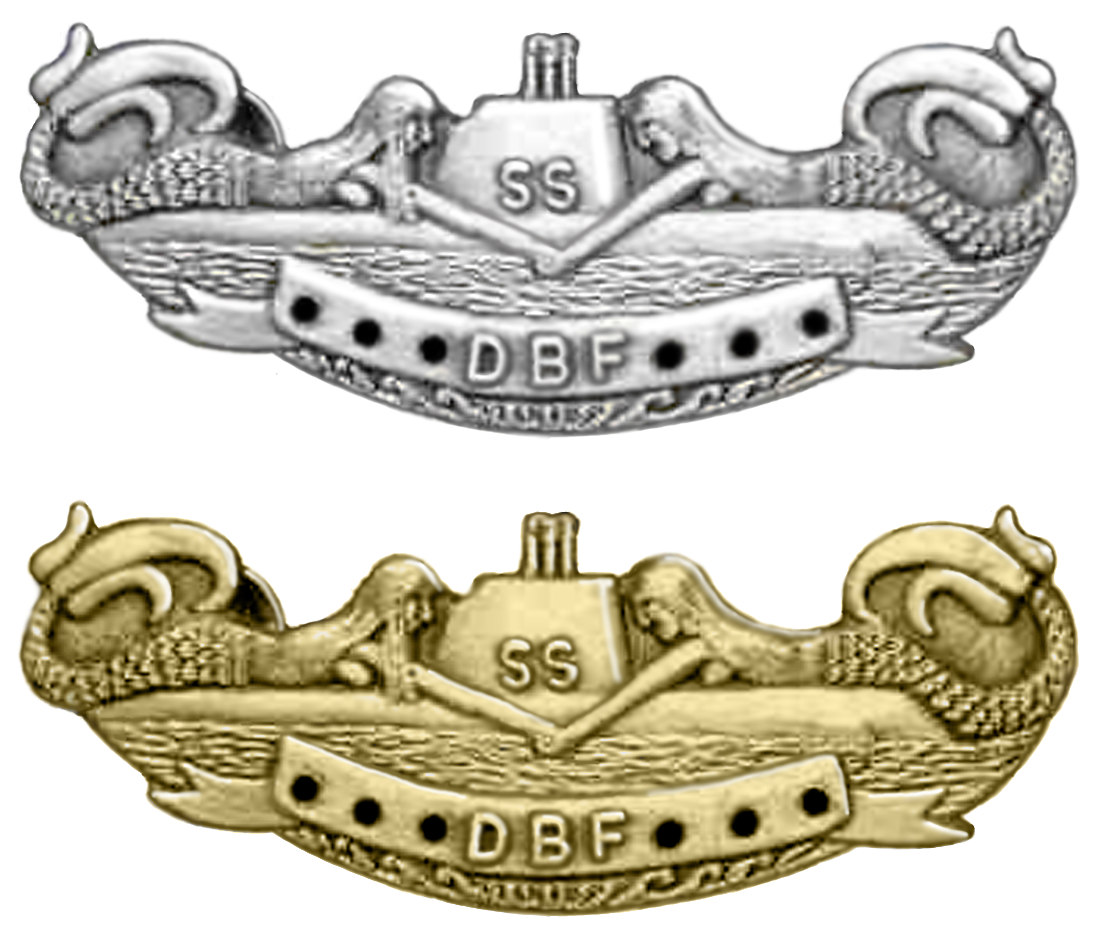
Diesel Boats Forever pin

During the 1950s and 1960s, the early classes of nuclear submarines suffered propulsion plant reliability problems, and occasionally were unable to complete their assigned missions. In 1969, while deployed in WESPAC, Barbel was assigned to fill in on a "special mission" for such a nuclear submarine. It was noted by the control room watch standers at that time that there should be some sort of recognition badge, similar to the recently authorized "Polaris Patrol Pin", for diesel boats required to fill in for a broken down nuclear submarine. A contest was held to design the badge. ETR3(SS) Leon Figurido's winning design was a broadside view of a guppy submarine with SS superimposed on the North Atlantic sail. There were two bare-breasted mermaids facing towards the sail with arms outstretched. Completing the design was a wreath under the boat, with holes for stars, and centered on the wreath were the letters "DBF" standing for "Diesel Boats Forever". And so was born the Diesel Boats Forever pin.

== 1970s and 1980s ==
In 1973 Barbel's weapons division set a SUBPAC record for successfully shooting 118 torpedoes that year. This included successful salvo firing two Mark 16-8 exercise torpedoes, and a successful MK 16-8 warshot operational test. In addition the boat performed a zero error Mark 45 torpedo Technical Standardization Inspection conducted by DoD, a Navy Technical Proficiency Inspection, and the torpedomen identified the source of the MK 45 torpedo "flex hose eater problem." For this record, Barbel was awarded the 1973 Battle Efficiency "E". Barbel's record for firing torpedoes was around 1978. She also succeeded in a simulated "sinking" of the aircraft carrier Enterprise during Exercise RIMPAC during that same period.

From 19 January 1981 to 22 January, Barbel and fellow submarine Grayback participated in ASWEX 81-3U off the coast of the Philippines, an exercise in shallow water ASW. The submarines opposed the transit of the oiler USNS Navasota, which was escorted by the destroyers John Young (CTF 75 embarked) and Elliot, and frigates Gray, Whipple, Lang, Ramsey and through the narrow straits.

From 1988 until her decommissioning in 1989, Barbel was commanded by Commander William F. Bundy who was the first African-American Navy enlisted man to rise to become a submarine commander. After retiring from the Navy, Bundy served as Director of the Rhode Island Department of Transportation and later as a professor at the Naval War College in Newport, Rhode Island.

On 1 May 1989, while operating off Kyūshū, Japan, three submariners were washed overboard by heavy waves. One sailor was rescued; two drowned. Due to extensive damage from flooding during the incident, the decision was made to decommission Barbel. Supposedly, the May '89 event was caused soon after having surfaced due to improperly ensuring the vessel had a proper positive buoyancy, and when a large wave went over the bow, the boat was driven below periscope depth before ship's force was able to recover depth control and resurface.

== Fate ==
Barbel was decommissioned on 4 December 1989, and stricken from the Naval Vessel Register on 17 January 1990. The Navy sold Barbel to a scrapper who began the process of scrapping her. After the sail, superstructure and induction piping were removed, the scrapper discovered the boat's interior was filled with painted-over asbestos insulation. Scrapping ceased at that time while the scrapper decided what to do with Barbel. Barbel had her sail and superstructure reconstructed out of plywood for a brief role in the movie Crimson Tide (1995). She is seen as the submarine when it is tied up and they are making preparations for departure on patrol. After eight years Barbel returned to Navy ownership. She was towed from the berth in San Pedro, Los Angeles and on 30 January 2001 she was sunk as a target off the California coast in 1,972 fathoms (3,606 m)
