= USS Bonefish (SS-582) =

Submarine of the United States

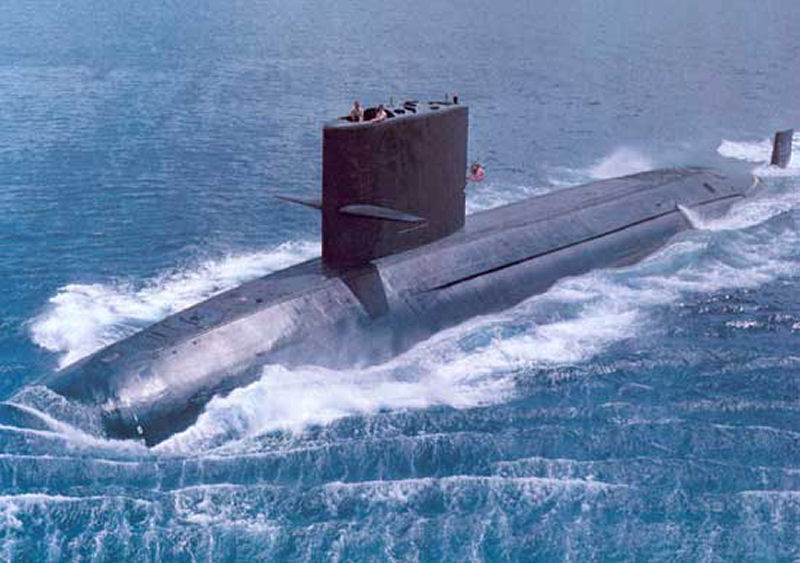
- USS Bonefish c.1981

History

United States
- Name: USS Bonefish
- Namesake: Bonefish
- Awarded: 29 June 1956
- Builder: New York Shipbuilding, Camden, New Jersey, U.S.
- Laid down: 3 June 1957
- Launched: 22 November 1958
- Commissioned: 9 July 1959
- Decommissioned: 28 September 1988
- Stricken: 28 February 1989
- Fate: Sold for scrap, 17 August 1989

General characteristics
- Class & type: Barbel-class diesel-electric submarine
- Displacement: 1,750 tons (1,778 t) light; 2,146 tons (2,180 t) full; 2,637 tons (2,679 t) submerged; 402 tons (408 t) dead
- Length: 219 ft 6 in (66.90 m) overall
- Beam: 29 ft (8.8 m)
- Draft: 25 ft (7.6 m) max
- Installed power: 3,150 bhp (2,350 kW) (diesel engines); 4,800 bhp (3,600 kW) (electric motors)
- Propulsion: 3 × Fairbanks-Morse diesel engines; 2 × General Electric electric motors, 1 × screw
- Speed: 12 kn (14 mph; 22 km/h) (surfaced); 25 kn (29 mph; 46 km/h) (submerged)
- Endurance: 90 minutes at full speed; 102 hours at 3 kn (3.5 mph; 5.6 km/h)
- Test depth: 712 ft (217 m) operating; 1,050 ft (320 m) crush
- Complement: 8 officers, 69 men
- Armament: 6 × 21 inch (533 mm) bow torpedo tubes (18 torpedoes)

USS Bonefish (SS-582) was a Barbel-class submarine of the United States Navy, and was the second U.S. Navy submarine to be named for the bonefish.

== Construction and commissioning ==
The contract to build Bonefish was awarded on 29 June 1956 to the New York Shipbuilding Corporation of Camden, New Jersey, and her keel was laid down on 3 June 1957. She was launched on 22 November 1958, sponsored by Mrs. Lawrence L. Edge, widow of Commander Lawrence Edge, who was lost with his ship, the first Bonefish, in 1945. She was commissioned on 9 July 1959 with Lieutenant Commander Elmer H. Kiehl in command.

== Service history ==
Bonefish conducted trials and training off the New England coast until the spring of 1960. On 1 April 1960, she departed New London, Conn., to join the Pacific Fleet. On 23 May, the submarine reported for duty with Submarine Division 33 (SubDiv 33) at Naval Station San Diego, California. She operated out of that port until 16 September, when she embarked upon her first deployment to the western Pacific.

While in the Far East, the warship participated in various 7th Fleet exercises and visited ports in Japan, the Philippines, the Marianas, and at Hong Kong. Bonefish concluded her first tour of duty with the 7th Fleet on 13 March 1961 when she arrived back in San Diego. The submarine conducted normal operations out of San Diego until 4 October, when she entered the Mare Island Naval Shipyard for her first regular overhaul. She completed repairs on 6 March 1962, and resumed operations along the west coast at that time.

In May, the submarine again headed for the western Pacific for a deployment quite similar to her first cruise in Oriental waters. She returned to San Diego in December and began an extended upkeep period. In February 1963, Bonefish moved to a new home port, Pearl Harbor, Hawaii. During the summer of 1963, she made a two-month cruise to the western Pacific, returning to Pearl Harbor in August. After four months of operations in the Hawaiian Islands, the submarine headed for the Far East again in January 1964. That tour of duty ended with her return to Oahu in July. Following a post-deployment standdown and local operations, she entered the Pearl Harbor Naval Shipyard for a regular overhaul.

Repairs occupied her time during the remainder of 1964, and local operations in the Hawaiian operating area took up the entire year of 1965. In April 1966, Bonefish deployed to the western Pacific for the fourth time. In addition to taking part in 7th Fleet training exercises, she also operated in the Gulf of Tonkin. The seven-month Far Eastern assignment ended in November when she reentered Pearl Harbor.

Bonefish resumed normal operations after the post-deployment rest and upkeep period. That employment lasted until October 1967, when she headed back to the Orient. There, she engaged in 7th Fleet training evolutions and made port visits at Hong Kong, in the Philippines, and in Japan. April 1968 saw her back at Oahu resuming local operations. In September, the submarine entered the Pearl Harbor Naval Shipyard for her regular overhaul.

Repairs occupied her until June 1969, and post-overhaul trials and refresher training followed. In November, the warship voyaged back to the western Pacific, and the normal round of exercises and port visits ensued. She concluded that cruise at Pearl Harbor in June 1970. Following seven months of operations out of Pearl Harbor, Bonefish departed that port on 9 February 1971 on her way back to the Far East.

Her activities included the usual port visits and exercises as well as a tour of duty with Task Force 77 (TF 77) in the Gulf of Tonkin. She returned to Hawaii on 10 August and, after post deployment standdown, resumed operations in the Hawaii operating area. For exceptional performance during the 1969–1970 WestPac, Bonefish was awarded a Meritorious Unit Citation for readiness.

That deployment lasted until 7 February 1972 when she began another regular overhaul at the Pearl Harbor Naval Shipyard. That repair period lasted through the year, and a material casualty to the snorkel piping system during sea trials in March 1973 extended it into July 1973. In July, the submarine went to sea for refresher training. Thereafter, local operations occupied her for the next 10 months. On 24 May 1974, she stood out of Pearl Harbor for yet another assignment with the 7th Fleet in Far Eastern waters. Bonefish returned to Pearl Harbor from that routine deployment on 7 November and began 13 months of local operations.

On 6 December 1975, the submarine departed Oahu bound for the Orient. During that tour of duty, she participated in exercises with units of the Korean and Taiwanese navies as well as with elements of the Japanese Maritime Self-Defense Force. She concluded 7th Fleet assignments on 25 April 1976 when she stood out of Subic Bay on her way home. The warship arrived back in Pearl Harbor on 15 May. After a four-week standdown and a brief period of operations, Bonefish entered the Pearl Harbor Naval Shipyard on 26 July. The repairs and modifications took nearly a year to complete. She emerged from the shipyard on 25 June 1977 to begin post-overhaul refresher training.

Bonefish conducted training out of Pearl Harbor until early November. On the 8th, she put to sea for San Diego, her new home port, and reached her destination on 18 November. She remained in port for three weeks to allow crewmen to settle into the new home port. On 6 December 1977, the submarine began operations along the California coast. She spent the first 20 weeks of 1978 conducting various training exercises out of San Diego.

On 17 May 1978, Bonefish put to sea for the western Pacific. Once again, she made the usual port visits and conducted exercises with units of friendly navies. The warship ended the deployment with her arrival back at San Diego on 28 October. She then conducted type training and other exercises along the California coast for the remainder of the year and into 1979.

During the first five months of 1979, Bonefish underwent a regular overhaul at the Pearl Harbor Naval Shipyard. On 1 June, the submarine embarked upon a deployment to South America. The voyage took her through the Panama Canal to the Caribbean Sea. She visited Trinidad, Tobago, Curaçao, Colombia, Venezuela, and the Netherlands Antilles before retransiting the canal. Thereafter, Bonefish stopped in Ecuador, Peru, and Chile. Throughout the cruise, the warship conducted UNITAS exercises with the armed forces of the countries visited. At the end of the South American deployment, she resumed normal operations out of San Diego, and that employment occupied her time for the remainder of 1979 and during 11 of the 12 months of 1980.

On 8 December 1980, Bonefish stood out of San Diego on her way to duty with the 7th Fleet. The usual calls to Far Eastern ports punctuated her periods at sea engaged in training missions. The submarine ended that cruise at San Diego on 14 July 1981. Following the normal post-deployment leave and upkeep period, she resumed operations along the west coast of North America.

That employment continued until 8 June 1982, when Bonefish departed San Diego on her way to the east coast. She transited the Panama Canal on 23 June and arrived in Naval Station Charleston, South Carolina, her new home port, on 6 July. On 11 August the submarine put to sea to participate in NATO exercises in the North Atlantic. At the end of those operations, she visited Hamburg, West Germany, and Portsmouth, England, before returning to Charleston on 9 October.

Normal operations out of Charleston occupied Bonefish for the remainder of 1982 and during the first three weeks of 1983. On 25 January, the submarine commenced a 14-month overhaul at the Charleston Naval Shipyard. She resumed active service in the western Atlantic and West Indian operating areas on 5 April 1984 and remained so engaged through the end of the year.

Between 1984 and 1988, the USS Bonefish (SS-582) was primarily engaged in U.S. fleet exercises, serving as one of the non-nuclear combat submarines still in operation in the U.S. Navy.

=== Fire ===
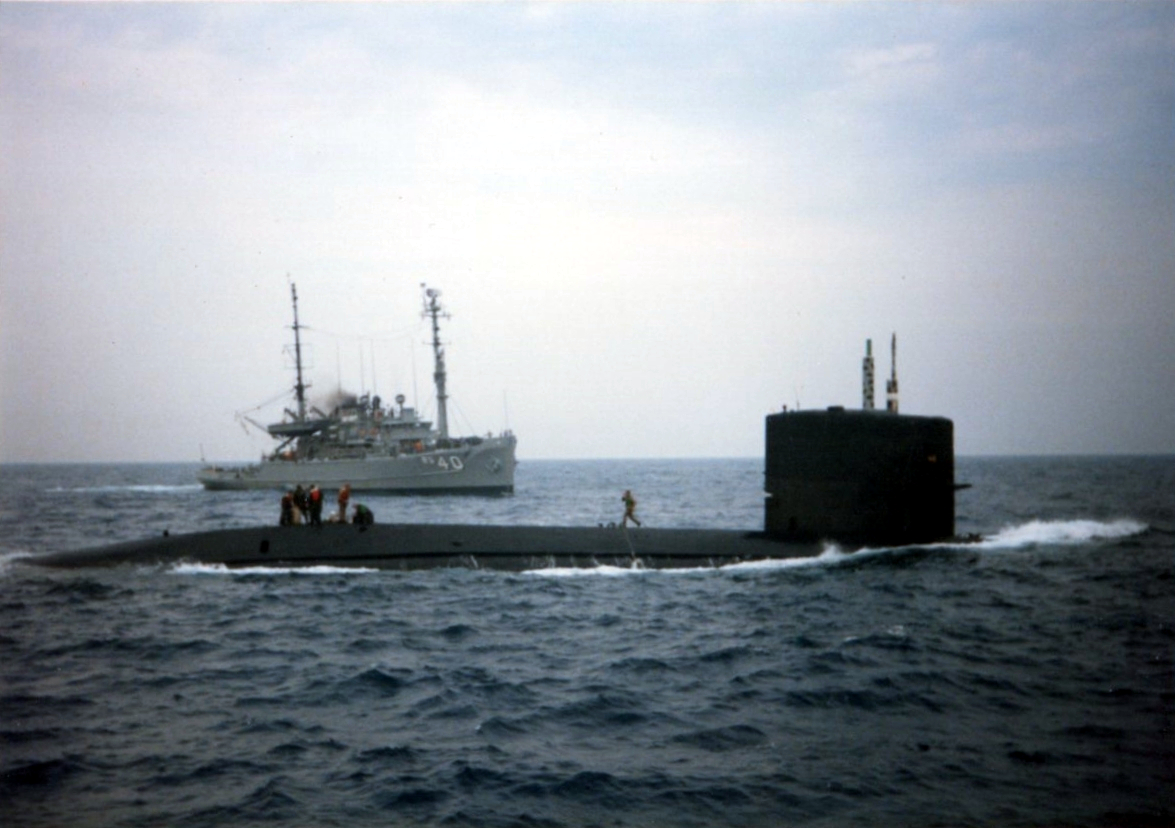
Rescue efforts aboard USS Bonefish after the explosion and fire. The USS Hoist is in the background.

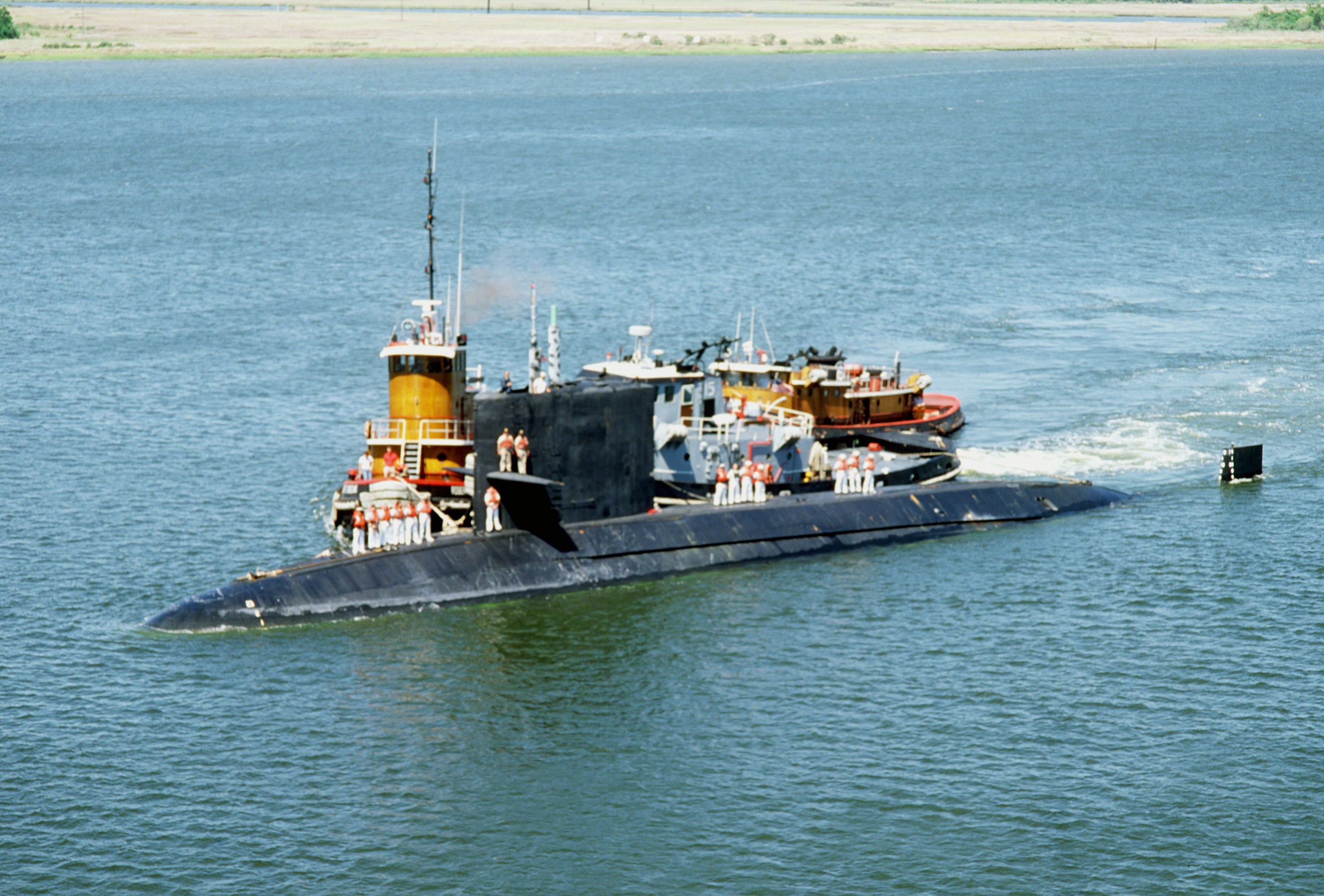
Bonefish returning to Charleston after the fire, 1988.

On 24 April 1988 Bonefish was submerged during an exercise with guided-missile frigate USS Carr, about 160 mi (260 km) off the Atlantic coast of Florida. A leaky seal in the Bonefish’s Trash Disposal Unit, which was used to eject waste into the water, caused seawater to begin leaking onto cables and electric buses in a battery-supply cableway. Arcing then caused an explosion, which flashed into a fire within minutes. The temperature in the battery space reached 1,200°F (650°C). The heat was so intense that it melted the soles of the shoes of the crewmembers in the space above.

Bonefish surfaced, and the captain ordered the crew to abandon ship. The crews of a whaleboat from Carr and helicopters from both Carr and the aircraft carrier USS John F. Kennedy rescued 89 men. Anti-Submarine Warfare Operator (AW) Petty Officer Third Class Larry B. Grossman, an Aviation Rescue Swimmer (AIRR) and Navy Diver from Helicopter Anti-Submarine Squadron Seven (HS-7), with total disregard for his own safety, jumped from an H-3 helicopter into the ocean and spent more than three hours rescuing stricken sailors.

The first survivor, in a panic, knocked off Grossman's mask and Grossman gave up his own life preserver to calm the sailor down. Petty Officer Grossman swam thousands of yards, without a mask or his own life preserver, and continued to rescue submariners in the choppy waters. Grossman's eyes were nearly swollen shut from the fuel and saltwater. He received minor chemical burns on his body from the diesel fuel spilled in the ocean and remained overnight in the medical ward on the aircraft carrier for his injuries. He received credit for having saved 19 lives.

Grossman received the Navy and Marine Corps Medal from the President for his extraordinary heroism. The Navy and Marine Corps Medal is the highest noncombat decoration awarded for heroism within the US Department of the Navy, ranking immediately above the Bronze Star Medal in the Awards and decorations of the United States Armed Forces order of precedence for the awards and decorations of the US armed forces.

Three crewmembers – Lieutenant Ray Everts, Radioman First Class (RM1) (SS) Bob Bordelon, and Yeoman Third Class (YN3) (SS) Marshal Lindgren – died due to the fire. The frigate USS McCloy, serving as headquarters of the rescue operation, pulled alongside Bonefish to remove the bodies. Afterward USS Hoist, a salvage-and-rescue ship, towed Bonefish to Charleston, South Carolina.

Naval authorities deemed the damage to Bonefish to be too extensive to warrant repair and thus decided to decommission and scrap her.

=== Decommissioning ===
The Navy decommissioned Bonefish on 28 September 1988, struck her from the Naval Vessel Registry on 28 February 1989, and disposed of her by scrapping on 17 August 1989. Northrop Grumman later bought the hull for marine-concept testing.

=== USSVI ===
The Bonefish Base of the local United States Submarine Veterans Inc. is named after the USS Bonefish and holds monthly meetings in Riverside CA.

== Awards ==
- Meritorious Unit Commendation
- Navy E Ribbon (2 awards)
- National Defense Service Medal
- Armed Forces Expeditionary Medal
- Vietnam Service Medal with four campaign stars for Vietnam War service
- Sea Service Deployment Ribbon
- Vietnam Campaign Medal (Republic of Vietnam)
