= Zwaardvis-class submarine =

Submarine class

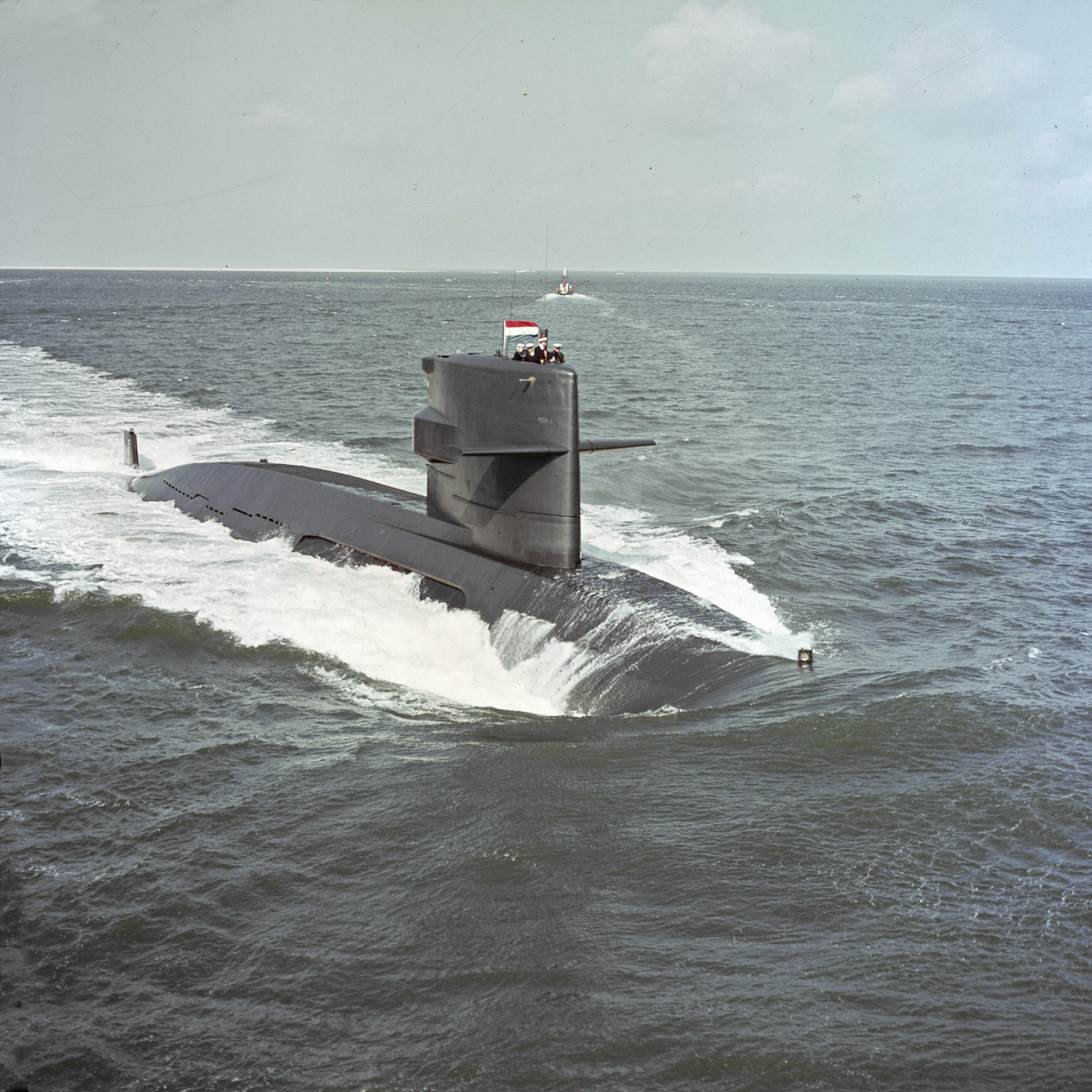
- Zwaardvis, lead submarine and namesake ship of her class

Class overview
- Name: Zwaardvis class
- Builders: Rotterdamsche Droogdok Maatschappij; Wilton-Fijenoord
- Operators: Royal Netherlands Navy; Republic of China Navy
- Preceded by: Walrus class
- Succeeded by: Walrus class; Moray class (proposed, canceled)
- Subclasses: Hai Lung class
- Built: 1966–1988
- In commission: 1972–present
- Planned: 4
- Completed: 4
- Active: 2
- Retired: 2

General characteristics
- Type: Diesel-electric attack submarine
- Displacement: 2,408 tonnes surfaced; 2,640 tonnes Submerged; 2,660 t and 2,376 t for Hai Lung
- Length: 66.9 m (219 ft 6 in)
- Beam: 8.4 m (27 ft 7 in)
- Draught: 7.1 m (23 ft 4 in); 6.7 m (22 ft 0 in) in Hai Lung
- Propulsion: 1 shaft from 3 × diesels, 4,200 hp (3,100 kW); 1 × Holec electric motor 5,100 hp (3,800 kW)
- Speed: 13 kn (24 km/h; 15 mph) surfaced; 20 kn (37 km/h; 23 mph) submerged
- Range: 10,000 nmi (20,000 km) at 9 knots (10 mph; 17 km/h)
- Test depth: 220 m (720 ft); 300 m (980 ft) for Hai Lung
- Complement: 67 (including 8 officers)
- Sensors & processing systems: radar type 1001; Sonar Elodone Octopus, type 20026 towed array, DUUX-5
- Armament: 6 × 533 mm tubes bow; 20 torpedoes (28 in Hai Lung)

The Zwaardvis-class submarine ("Swordfish") is a class of conventional attack submarines that were built to strengthen the Royal Netherlands Navy. The Dutch government opted for the choice to not replace the two Zwaardvis-class submarines with either more Walrus-class submarines, or submarines of a new design.

== History ==
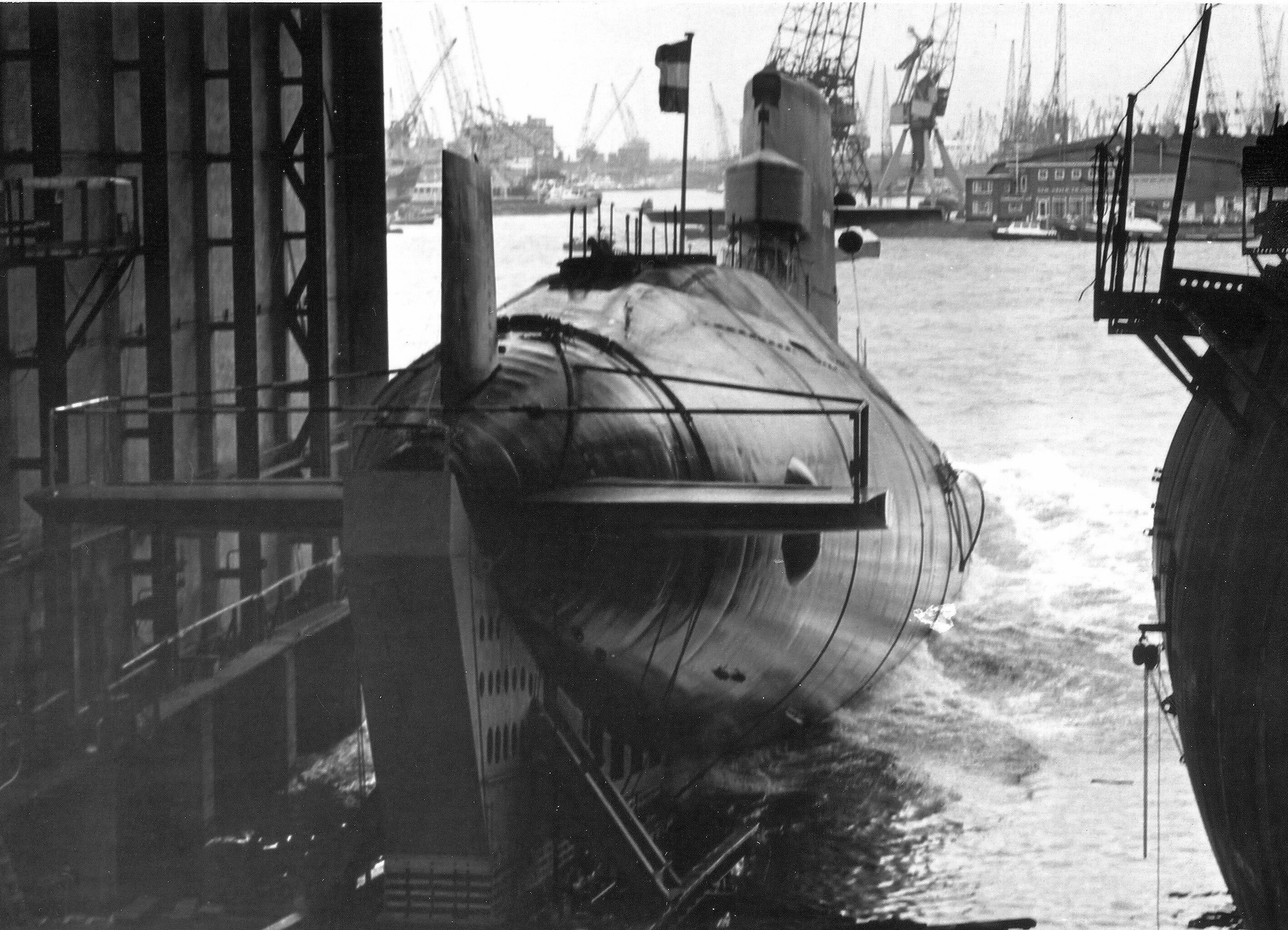
Launch of Zwaardvis in July 1970; sister ship Tijgerhaai can be seen on the right.

On 24 December 1965 the Royal Netherlands Navy gave Rotterdamsche Droogdok Maatschappij the order to build two submarines. At the time of this order the Royal Netherlands Navy believed that these two submarines could possibly make use of nuclear propulsion. Like many other navies around the world the Netherlands got interested in nuclear propulsion after the United States had put USS Nautilus into active service in 1955. The performance of this and succeeding nuclear submarine, such as the Skate-class submarines, were very promising at the time. It made the Dutch navy believe that nuclear submarines would play a crucial role in the future and not developing one would mean to be left behind by other navies who were focusing on nuclear submarines.

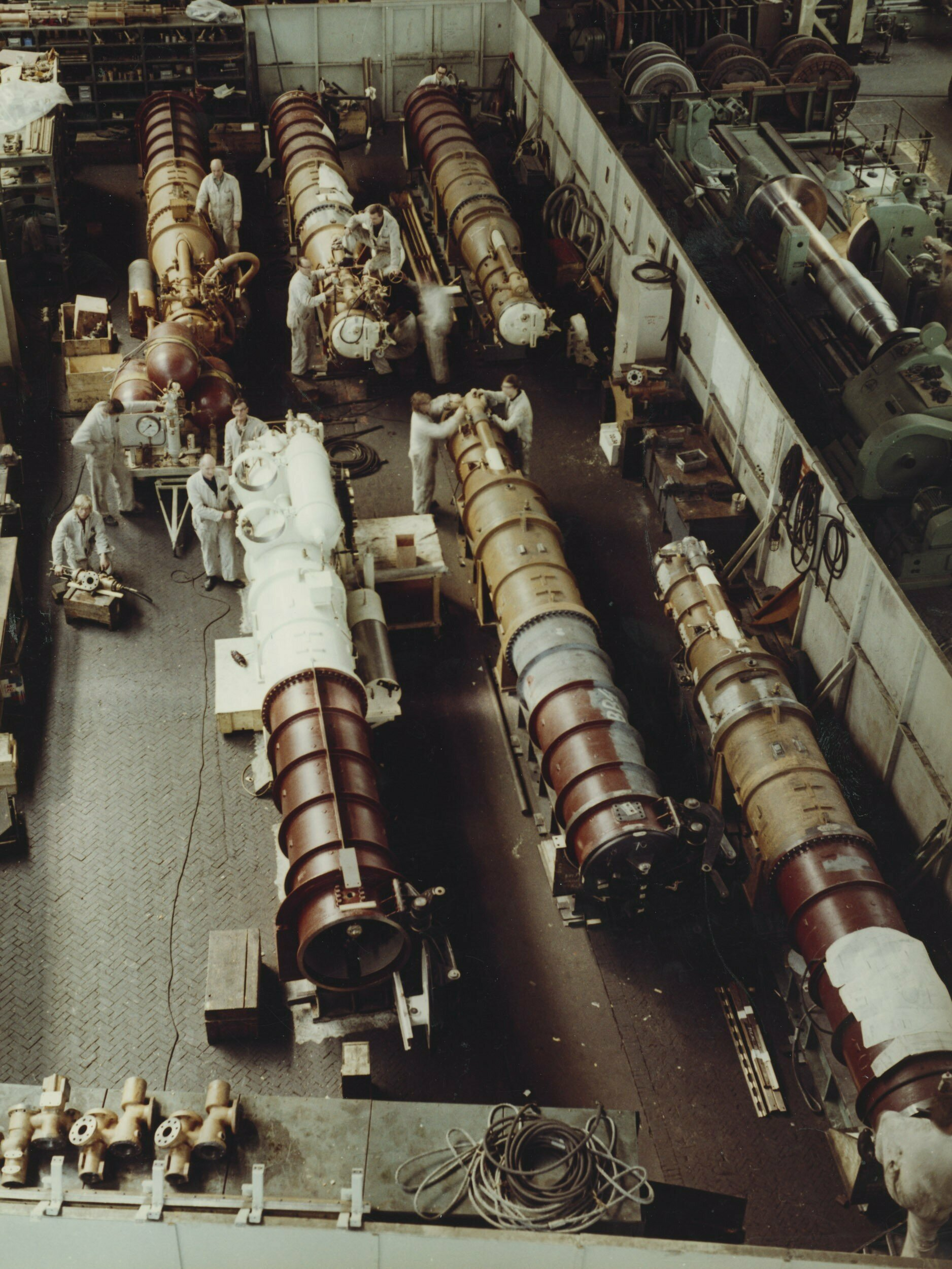
Construction of the torpedo tube launchers for ships of the class

In addition, the Royal Netherlands Navy was afraid that the diesel-electric Dolfijn-class submarines which had just entered service were no match for nuclear submarines. This would be problematic since the Dolfijn-class submarines were the most modern submarines the Dutch navy had at the time in their inventory. Furthermore, it was also a blow to the Dutch navy because their submarine fleet were just getting into the shape the navy had envisioned after the devastating Second World War. Besides Royal Netherlands Navy, Dutch naval experts at the time also stressed in numerous articles how important nuclear submarines were and that there would not be such a big technological leap forward again in at least a decade. These kind of statements and recommendations also encouraged the Royal Netherlands Navy to start thinking about acquiring nuclear submarines. In the meanwhile the keel laying of the two submarines that the Dutch navy had ordered took place on 14 July 1966. Zwaardvis was assigned building number 320, while Tijgerhaai was assigned building number 321. The two names were awarded by Queen Juliana of the Netherlands, on 7 September.

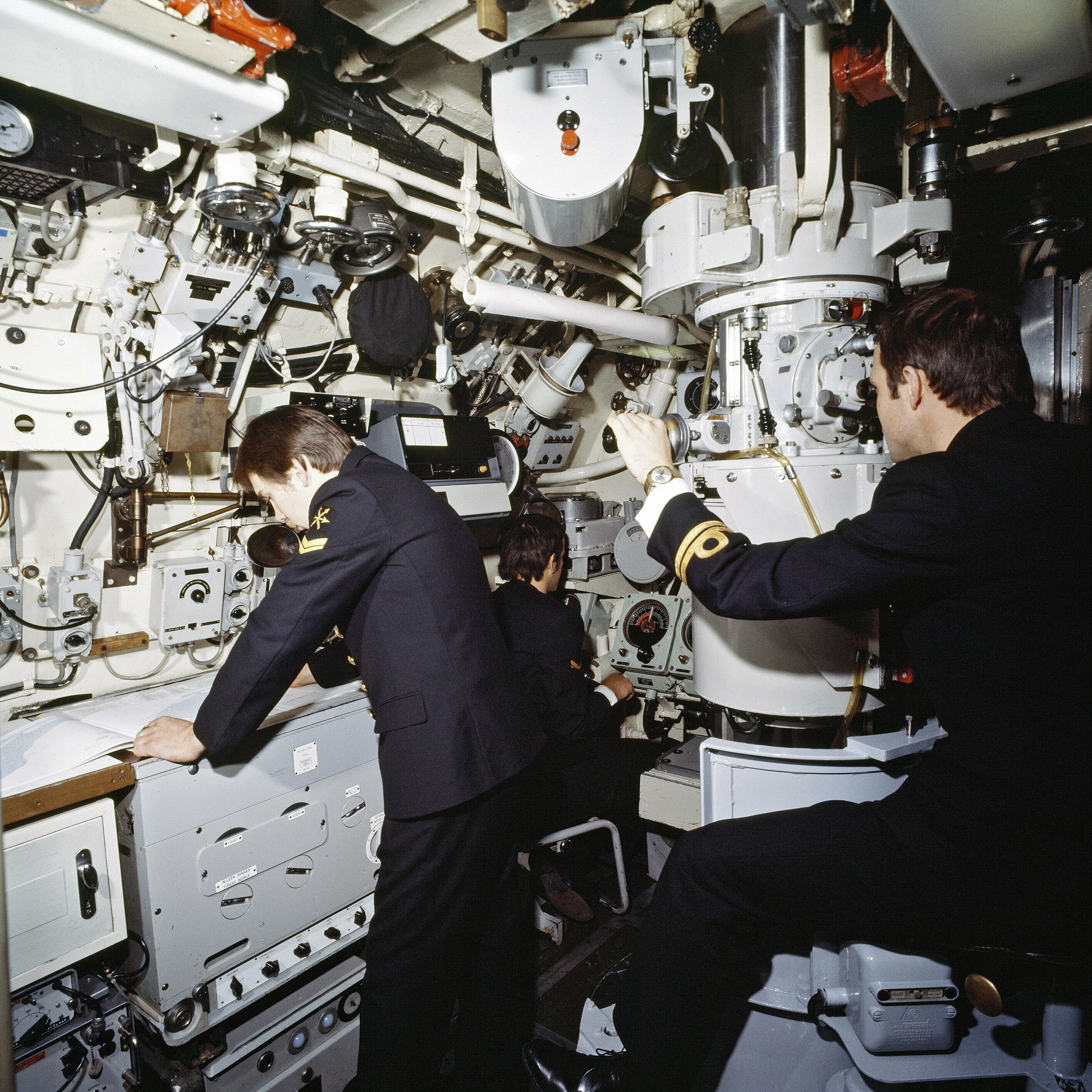
Operation of the periscope inside of the operations compartment aboard the Zwaardvis.

The Royal Netherlands Navy, together with research institute TNO, the Reactor Center of the Netherlands and Nevesbu, devoted itself during this time entirely on nuclear propulsion for submarines. However, the construction of Dutch nuclear submarines would never become a reality. There was simply not enough money, since the defence budget in this period could not cover the costs of both constructing nuclear submarines and maintaining all the ships in the Dutch fleet at the same time. Furthermore, already during the negotiations with the United States, it appeared that any nuclear submarines would not be built anytime soon.

The United States was not eager about the idea of the Netherlands building nuclear submarines, they rather had the Dutch navy focus on other areas within the NATO alliance, the negotiations therefore stopped in 1969. Paradoxically NATO did support the Dutch nuclear desire, but added that if the Dutch navy did not succeed in the short term, then two conventional submarines would have to be built. This is exactly what happened eventually with the Zwaardvis-class submarines being conventional diesel-electric submarines, with their hulls and general arrangement being based on the teardrop design of the last non-nuclear American submarine class, the Barbel class.

== Design ==
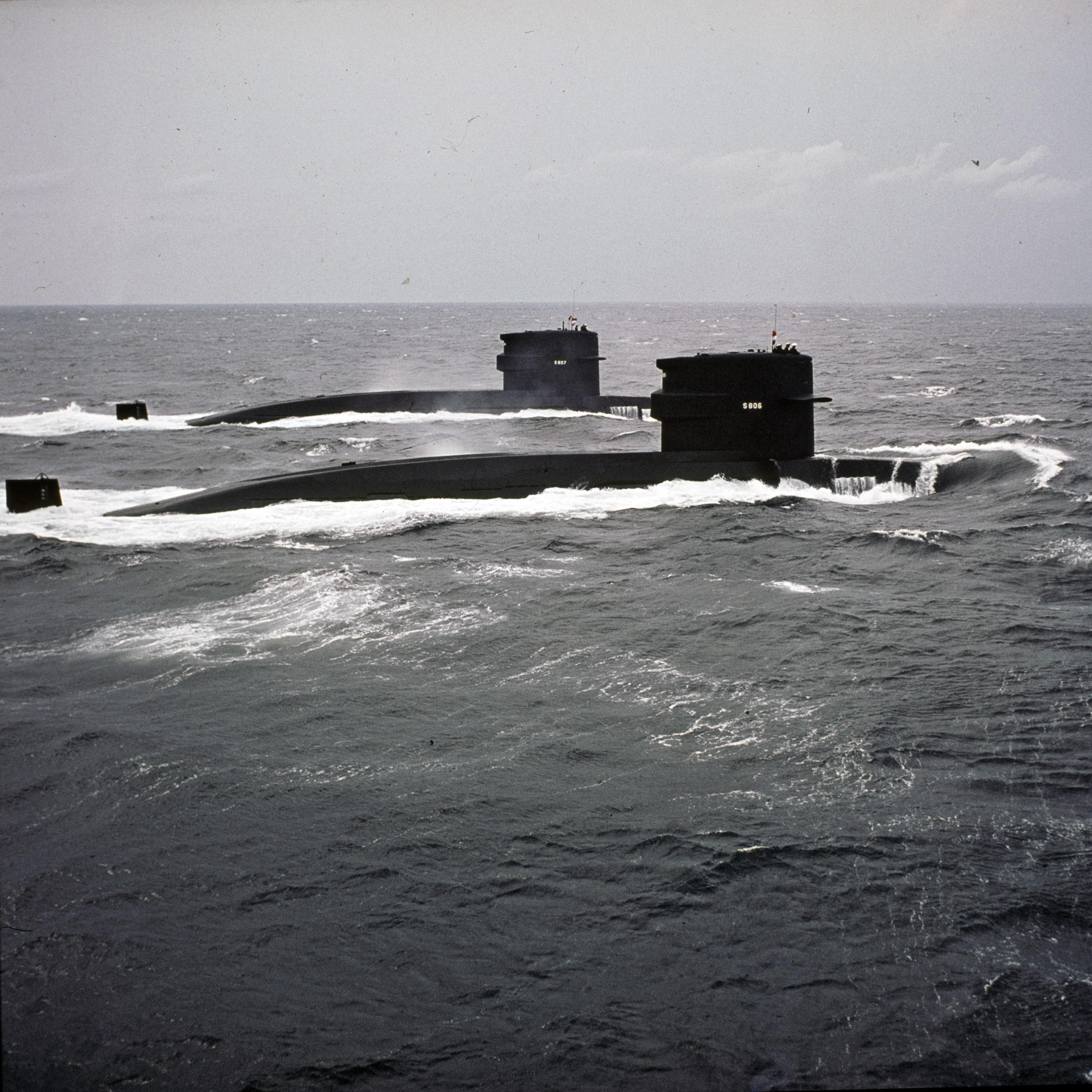
HNLMS Zwaardvis (at front) and HNLMS Tijgerhaai, the two Zwaardvis-class submarines in Dutch service.

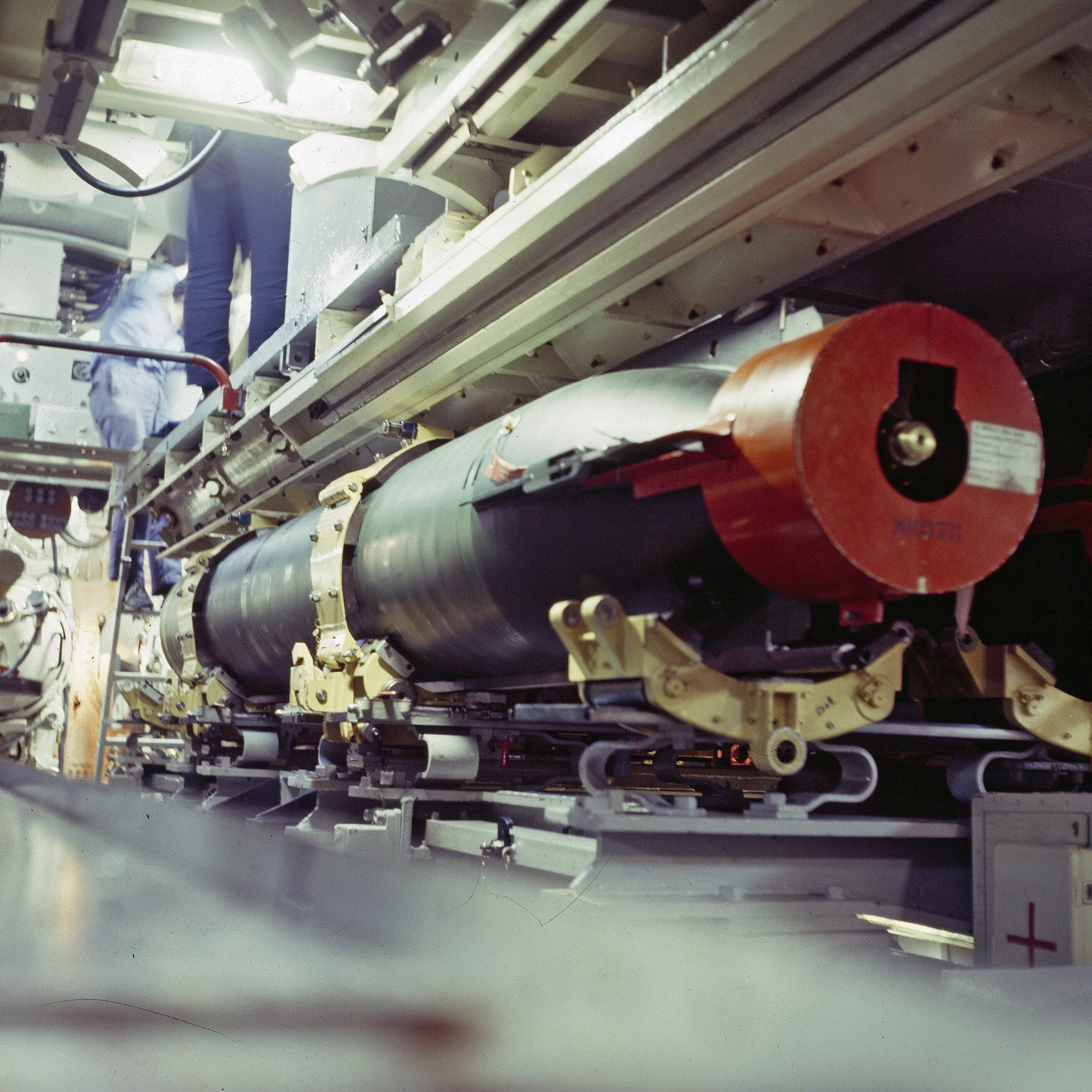
Torpedo storage aboard the Zwaardvis; bow torpedo storage room.

The Zwaardvis-class submarines were designed by the Royal Netherlands Navy and further worked out by the four biggest Dutch yards at the time, namely RDM, Wilton-Fijenoord, De Schelde and NDSM, and also by Werkspoor N.V. and N.V. Nederlandsche Vereenigde Scheepsbouw Bureaux. In comparison to the three-cylinder design of the Dolfijn-class submarines, the Zwaardvis-class submarines are based on one cylinder. The reasons why the Royal Netherlands Navy and its partners choose for this design was because it resulted in more space within the submarines, which would give the crew a more spacious accommodation and make it also easier to set up machines within the submarines. The hydraulic system of the boats included three pumps and three accumulators. They were equipped with controls sliders made by Rexroth.

In addition, the submarines are based on the U.S. Navy Barbel class with the teardrop hull design, which results in the submarines producing less noise. The propulsion of the Zwaardvis class is also different from the Dolfijn-class submarines, for example, it has a single propeller instead of the two propellers the latter has. Furthermore, it has more diesel engines, the batteries require less charging time, it can launch missiles and torpedoes from greater depths, the diving depth has increased substantially, and lastly it can stay longer submerged. The introduction of the Zwaardvis-class submarines also led to the Royal Netherlands Navy using the Mark 37 torpedoes. In 1988 the Mark 37 torpedoes for the Zwaardvis-class submarines were replaced with the newer Mark 48 torpedoes.

== Export ==
=== Taiwan ===
In September 1981 the Republic of China (Taiwan) ordered two modified Zwaardvis-class submarines, the Chien Lung/Hai Lung class. In 1992 a repeat order for another four boats was turned down by the Netherlands government because of pressure from the People's Republic of China.

=== Malaysia ===
The two decommissioned Dutch boats, Zwaardvis and Tijgerhaai, were sold in 1995 to RDM, which was planning to try to sell them to a new customer. In 1997 they were loaded onto a ship and transported to PSC-Naval Dockyard, Lumut, Malaysia in anticipation of purchase by the Malaysian Navy. However, the Malaysian Navy declined the offer and chose the French Scorpène class instead. As a result, the two boats stayed for a long time in Lumut awaiting a buyer. In 2005 a Dutch judge ordered on 17 Augustus 2005 that Rotterdamsche Droogdok Maatschappij must start with demolishing the two boats before 1 September 2005, or bring the boats back to the Netherlands before 1 October 2005, else they would have to face penalties, such as a payment penalty. Since Rotterdamsche Droogdok Maatschappij went broke, the Dutch Ministry of Defence eventually paid for the demolishing and scrapping of the two submarines. The costs of this were estimated at €2.8 million and the scrap was sold for €1.4 million.

== Boats ==
Ship	Builder	Laid down	Launched	Commissioned	Decommissioned
Zwaardvis	Rotterdamsche Droogdok Maatschappij	14 July 1966	2 July 1970	18 August 1972	1994
Tijgerhaai	Rotterdamsche Droogdok Maatschappij	14 July 1966	25 May 1971	20 October 1972	1995
Hai Lung class
Hai Lung	Wilton-Fijenoord	15 December 1982	6 October 1986	9 October 1987	In service
Hai Hu	Wilton-Fijenoord	December 1982	20 December 1986	9 April 1988	In service

== See also ==
- List of submarine classes in service

Equivalent submarines of the same era

- Yūshio class
- Vela class
- Type 035A
- Tango class

== Notes ==
=== Bibliography ===
==== Books ====
- Gardiner, Robert; Chumbley, Stephen; Budzbon, Przemysław, eds. (1995). Conway's All the World's Fighting Ships 1947–1995. Annapolis: Naval Institute Press. ISBN 1-55750-132-7.
- de Bles, Harry; Boven, Graddy; Homburg, Leon (2006). Onderzeeboten! (in Dutch). Zaltbommel: Aprilis. ISBN 978-90-5994-130-4.
- Jalhay, P.C.; Wijn, J.J.A. (1997). Ik nader ongezien! De onderzeeboten van de Koninklijke Marine. Amsterdam: De Bataafsche Leeuw. ISBN 978-9067074629.
- Schoonoord, D.C.L. (2012). Pugno pro patria: de Koninklijke Marine tijdens de Koude Oorlog (in Dutch). Franeker: Van Wijnen. ISBN 978-90-5194-455-6.

==== Web sources ====
- page from Dutch submarines
- van den Enden, A.H.A.P.; Goedhart, A.; Hamaker, P. "Herinneringsboek Hr. Ms. Zwaardvis" (PDF). RDM-collectie Johan Journée.
- Karremann, Jaime (June 29, 2017). "Zwaardvisklasse onderzeeboten". marineschepen.nl (in Dutch).
- Karremann, Jaime (February 16, 2016). "Zwaardvisklasse niet vervangen: hoe Nederland belangrijke onderzeebootbouwkennis verloor". marineschepen.nl (in Dutch).
