= Emergency main ballast tank blow =

Submarine maneuver

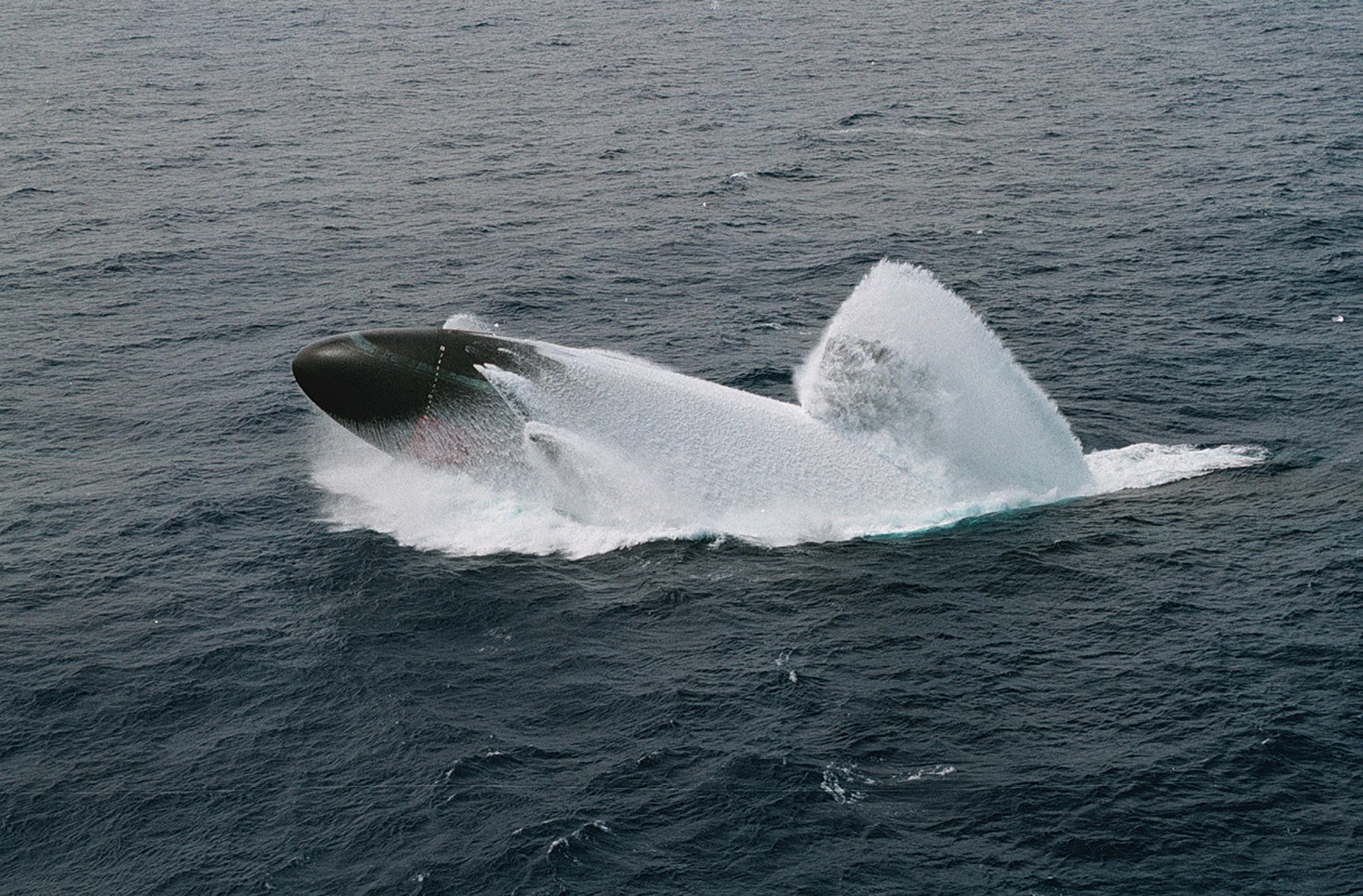
USS Columbus (SSN 762) performing an emergency ballast blow

An emergency main ballast tank blow is a procedure used aboard a submarine that forces high-pressure air into its main ballast tanks. The high-pressure air forces ballast water from the tanks, quickly lightening the ship so it can rapidly rise to the surface.

== Incidents ==
=== USS Thresher, 1963 ===
The partial failure of the emergency main ballast tank blow system contributed to the loss of USS Thresher in 1963. It was caused by icing of strainers in the air lines due to "the high volume of air moving past the strainers at such high velocity [which] would have caused them to cool rapidly." That accident resulted in substantial redesign of submarine emergency blow systems by the United States Navy: "Part of this initiative was to end the practice of brazing smaller pipes, and to instead start welding and doing X-ray inspection of joints to verify their integrity. It also resulted in changes in designs of the system that blows out the ballast tanks, providing a capability to do so seven times faster than the system used in the USS Thresher."

=== USS Greeneville, 2001 ===
A demonstration of the manoeuver was the cause of a collision between the USS Greeneville and a Japanese fishing boat, leading to nine civilian deaths.
