= Dutch ship Tonijn =

Tonijn is the name of the following ships of the Royal Netherlands Navy:

- Dutch ship Tonijn (1672)
- Dutch ship Tonijn (1674)
- HNLMS Tonijn, a Dolfijn-class submarine in commission 1966–1991, now a museum ship at the Dutch Navy Museum
