= HNLMS Zeehond =

HNLMS Zeehond (Dutch: Hr.Ms. or Zr.Ms. Zeehond) may refer to following ships of the Royal Netherlands Navy:

- HNLMS Zeehond (1943), ex-HMS Sturgeon (73S)
- HNLMS Zeehond (1948), ex-HMS Tapir (P335)
- HNLMS Zeehond (S809), a Dolfijn-class submarine
