= Northern Wedding =

Northern Wedding was a NATO Cold War naval military exercise, designed to test NATO's ability to rearm and resupply Western Europe during times of war with the Warsaw Pact. In 1978, it was described as being 'conducted every four years', but by the mid-1980s, Exercise Ocean Safari was being run in odd-numbered years, 'every other year, alternating with Northern Wedding.'

== Exercises ==
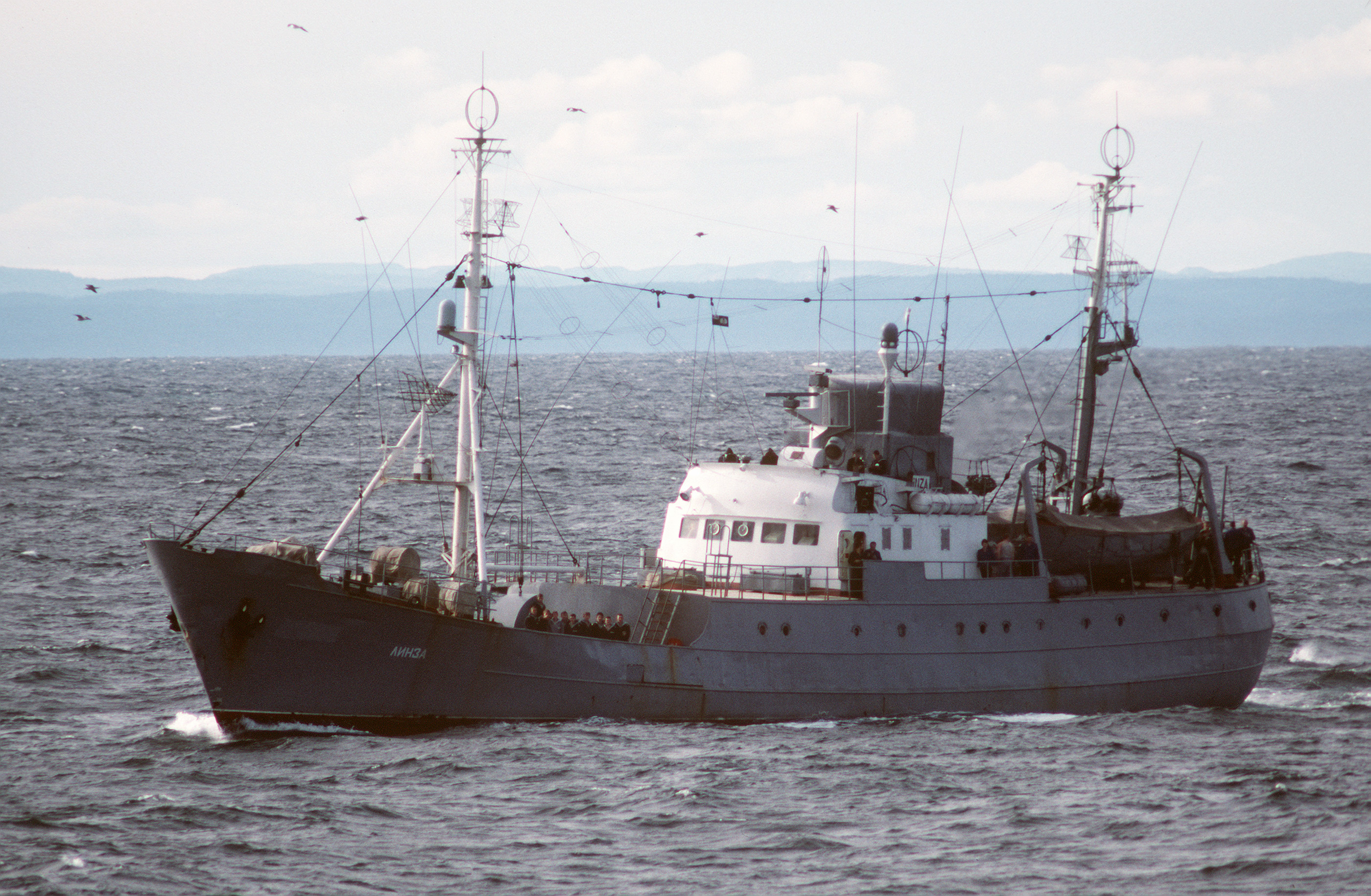
Soviet intelligence ship Linza observing NATO ships during Exercise Northern Wedding 86

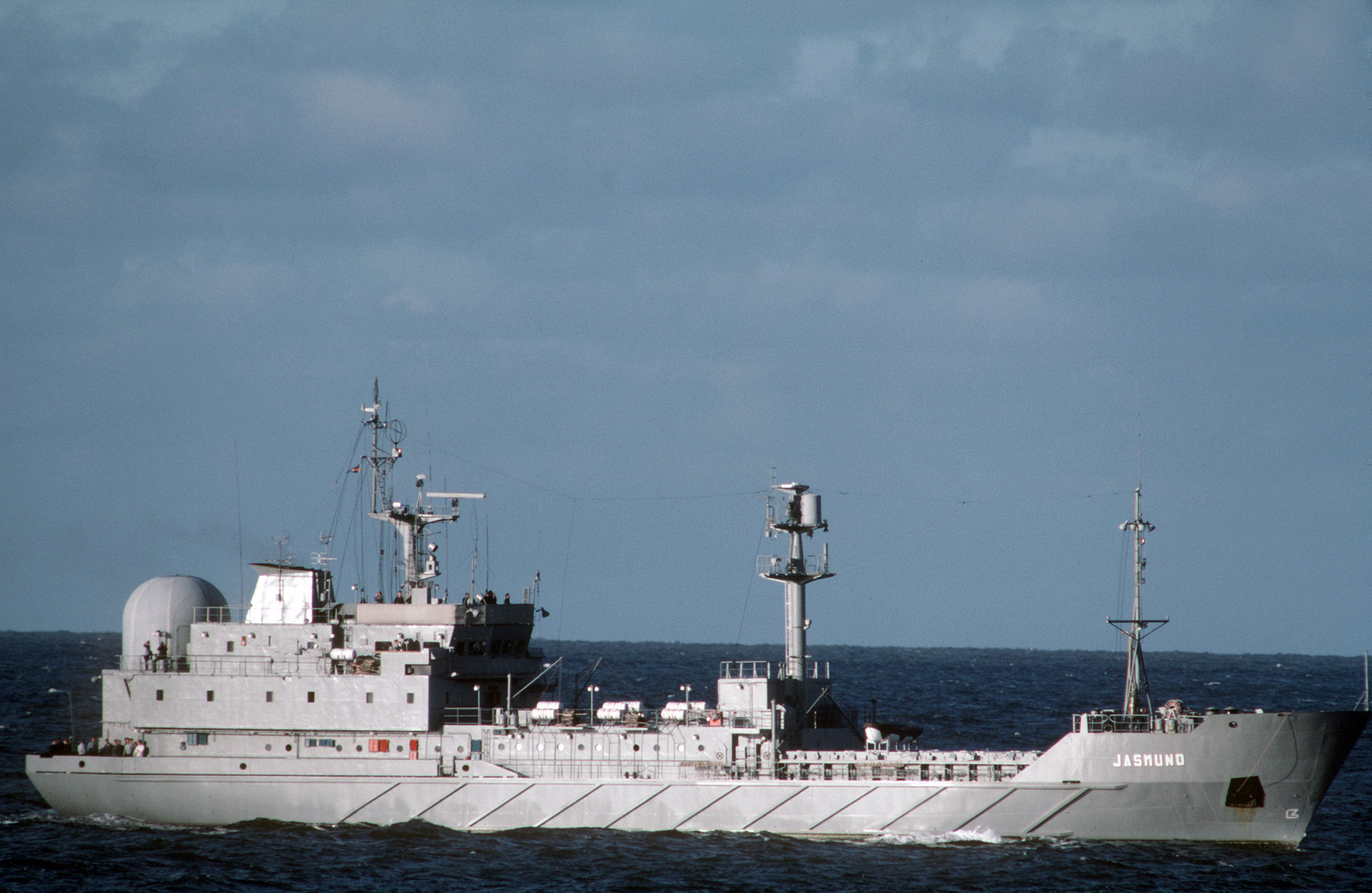
East German intelligence ship Jasmund

- 1970 - involved Royal Navy aircraft carriers and the Dolfijn-class submarine HNLMS Dolfijn of the Royal Netherlands Navy.
- 1972 - involved Royal Navy aircraft carriers.
- 1974 - involved Avro Vulcan aircraft of RAF Strike Command as part of the opposing force.
- 1978 September. The exercise was conducted by 40,000 men, 22 submarines, and 800 aircraft from nine countries. Two amphibious landing took place, one in the Shetland Islands and a second in Denmark. After a brief stop in Palma (24–28 August 1978), USS Forrestal (CV-59) left the Mediterranean en route to the Atlantic and the North and Norwegian Seas to take part in the huge NATO exercise Northern Wedding (4–18 September). It exercised allied abilities to reinforce Western Europe in the event of an Eastern Bloc attack. En route she put into Naval Station Rota to allow RADM Norman K. Green, Commander, Carrier Group 6, to embark, and for RADM Smedberg to disembark and transfer his flag to guided missile cruiser USS Harry E. Yarnell (CG-17). Forrestal and HMS Ark Royal led separate task groups that steamed in a two-carrier formation to gain sea control and deploy their aircraft to support amphibious landings in the Shetland Islands and the Jutland Peninsula in Denmark. Heavy seas and high winds, however, curtailed flight operations during the first phase of the exercises, but conditions improved just barely enough in the harsh northern climes to permit the ship and her embarked air wing to support the planned objectives. The professionalism and dedication to completing their tasks which the British and Canadians displayed especially impressed crewmembers, who noted these specific allies’ pride in more than one report. Vice Admiral Wesley L. McDonald, Commander, Second Fleet, gave a news conference to a group of U.S. and international journalists in the carrier's ‘War Room’ on the 9th, describing in some detail the significance of the exercise – normally held every four years – in preparing the allies to resist a Soviet-led attack against the West. After completing the exercise the ship returned to the Mediterranean, pausing in the Spanish port of Malaga (22–27 September).
- 1982 Late August to September. 160 ships and 250 aircraft participated in the exercise. And there were two amphibious landings.
- 1986 Late August to September. The exercise included an amphibious landing in Norway. On August 29, 1986, a CH-46 twin-rotor transport helicopter crashed into a parked helicopter while taking off from the assault ship USS Saipan and plunged into the sea off the Norwegian coast. The helicopter was carrying 21 people—four crew and 17 passengers - all U.S. servicemen. 8 Marines were killed in the incident. The helicopter went into the water some 60 miles west of Bodo, Norway, about 75 miles north of the Arctic Circle.

== Gallery - Northern Wedding '86 ==
=== NATO Fleet ===
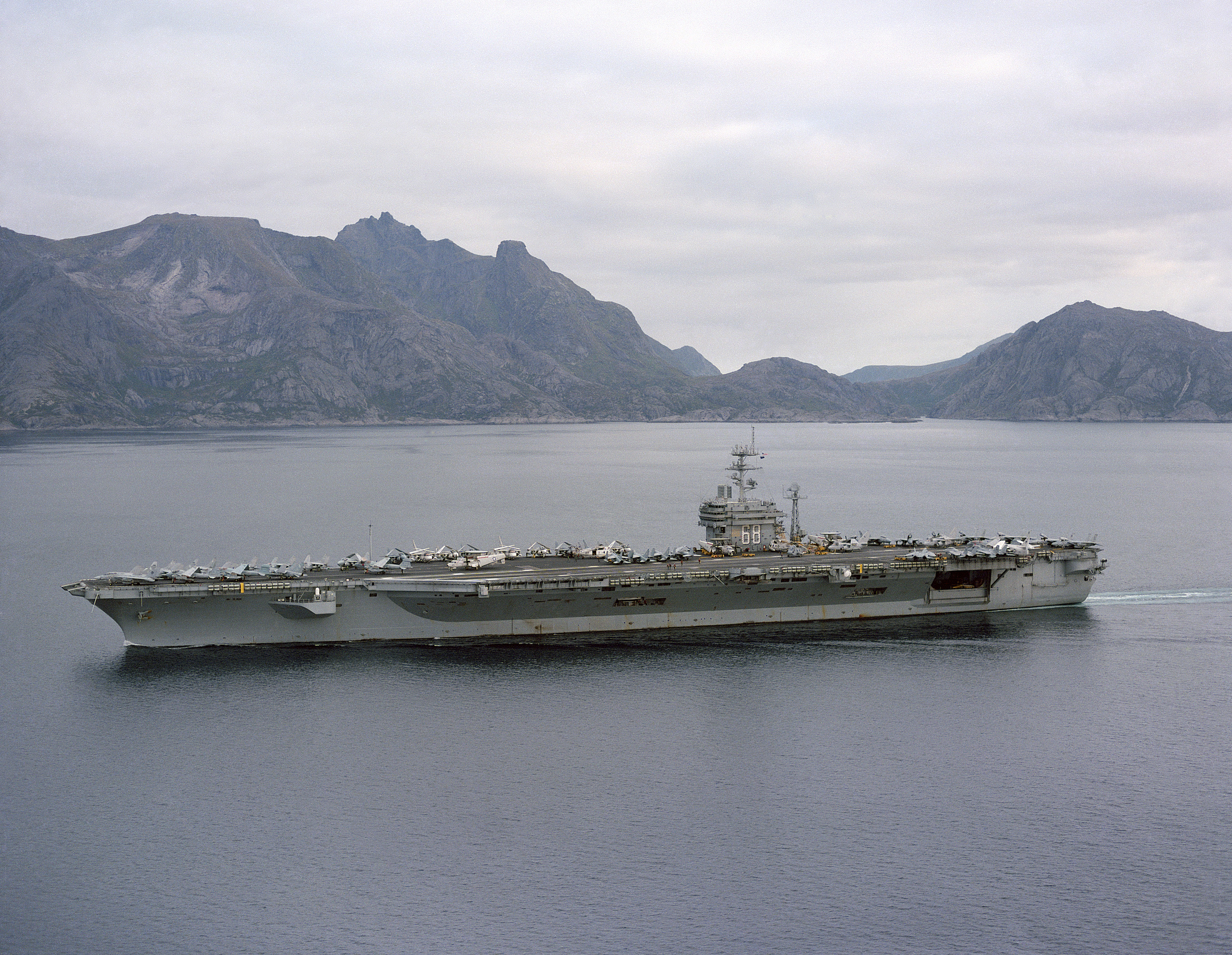
USS Nimitz (CVN-68) off Norway

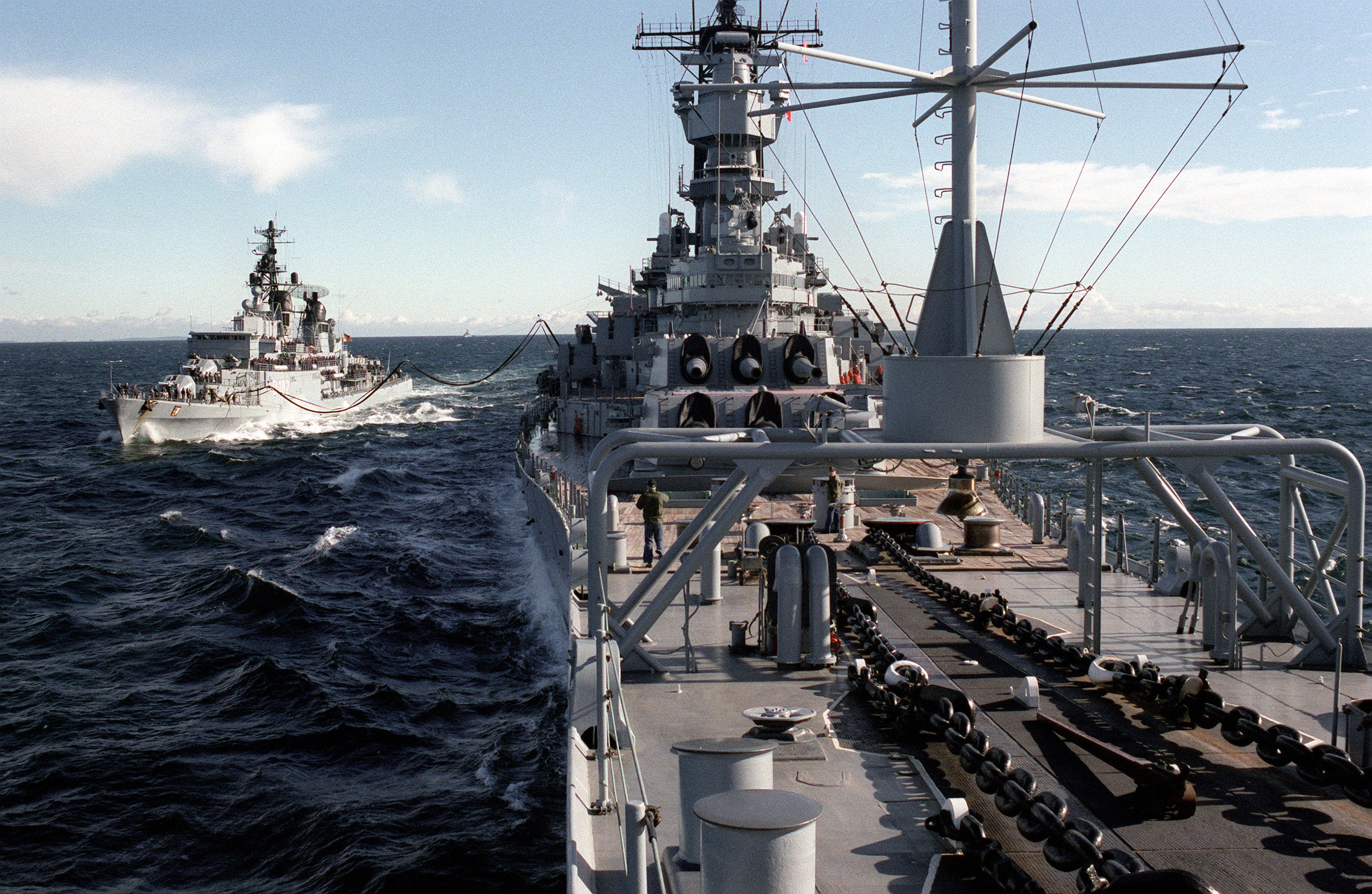
Schleswig-Holstein (D-182) and USS Iowa (BB-61)

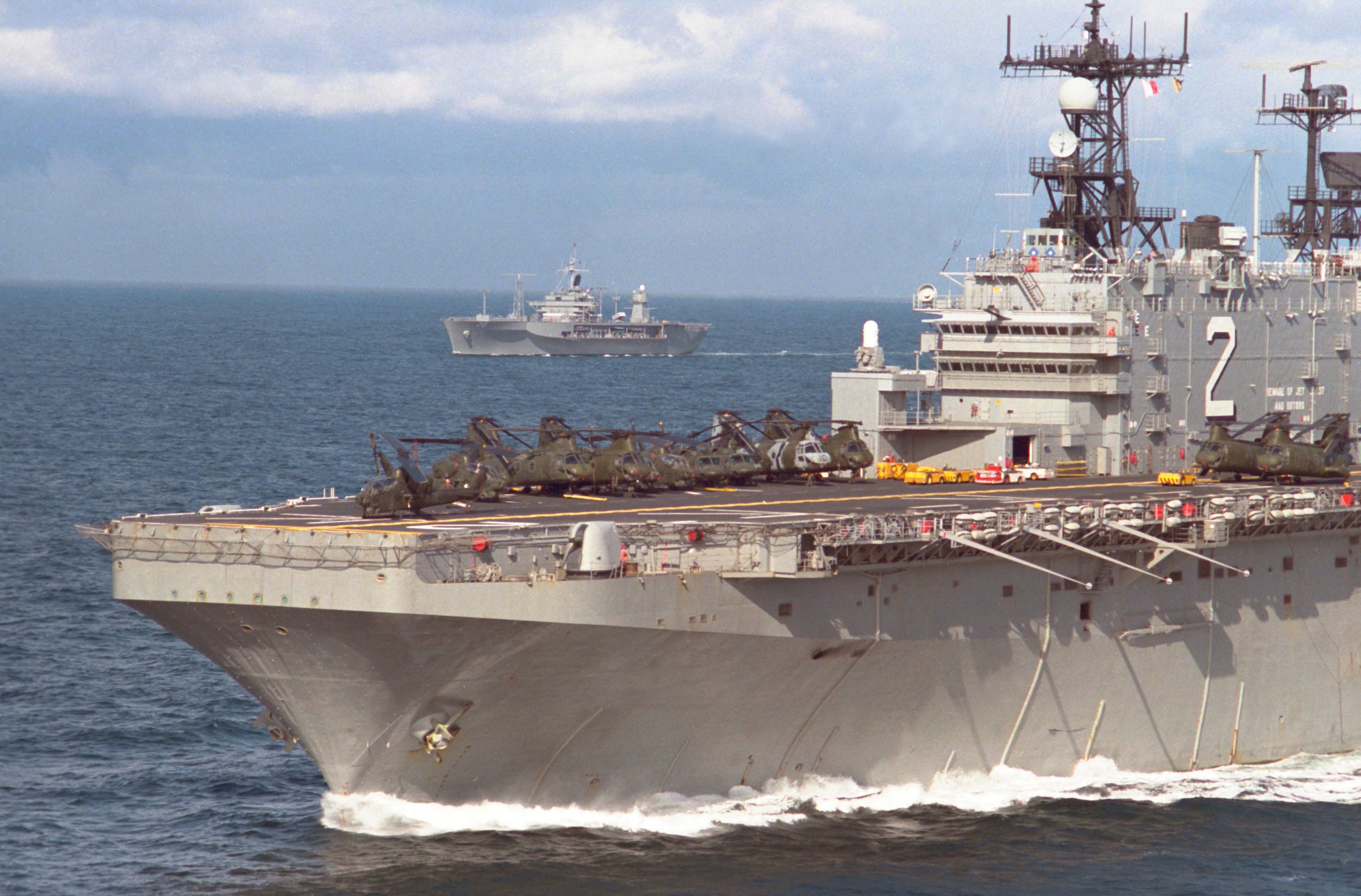
USS Saipan (LHA-2), with USS Mount Whitney (LCC-20) in the background

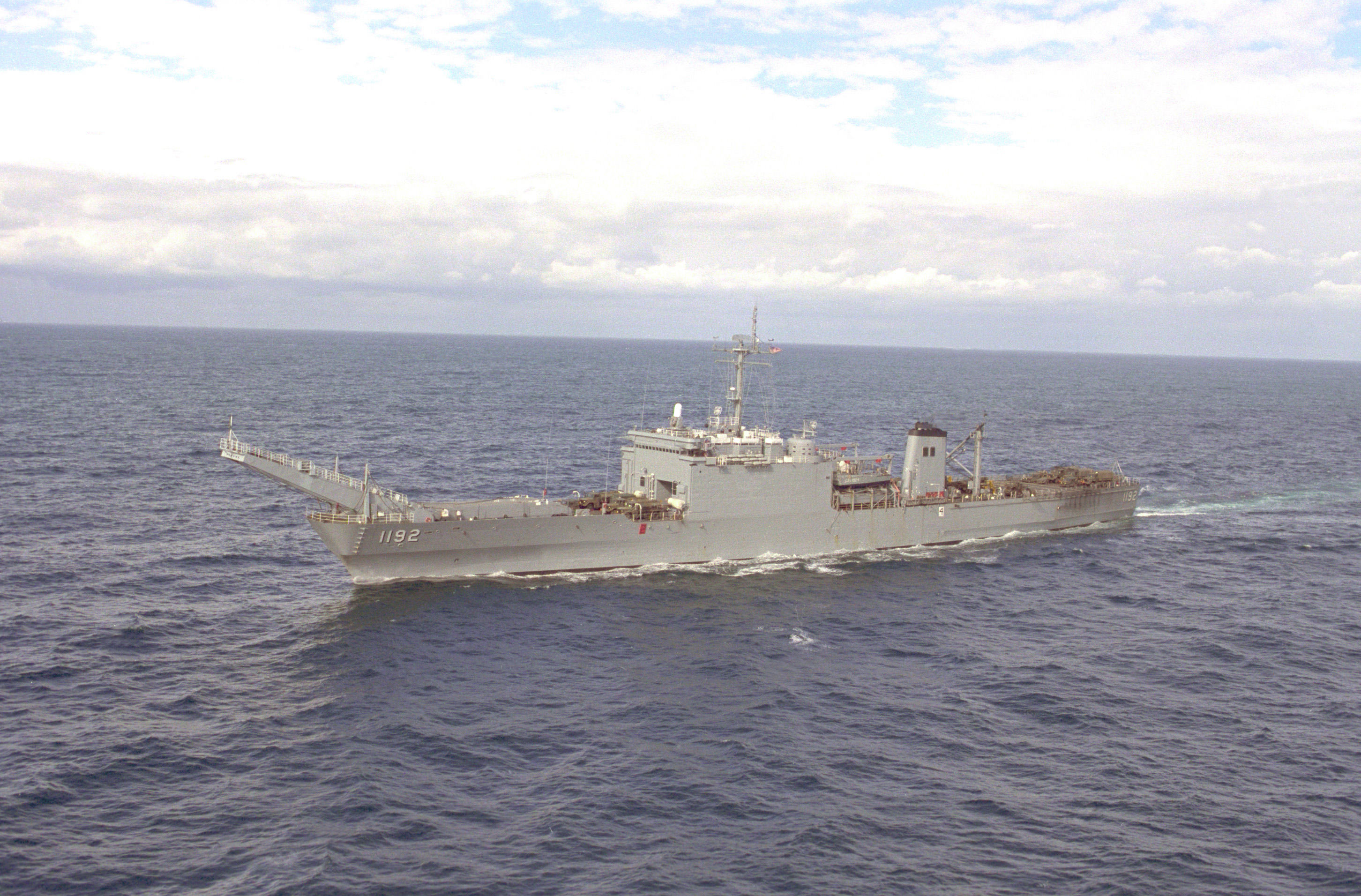
USS Spartanburg County (LST-1192)

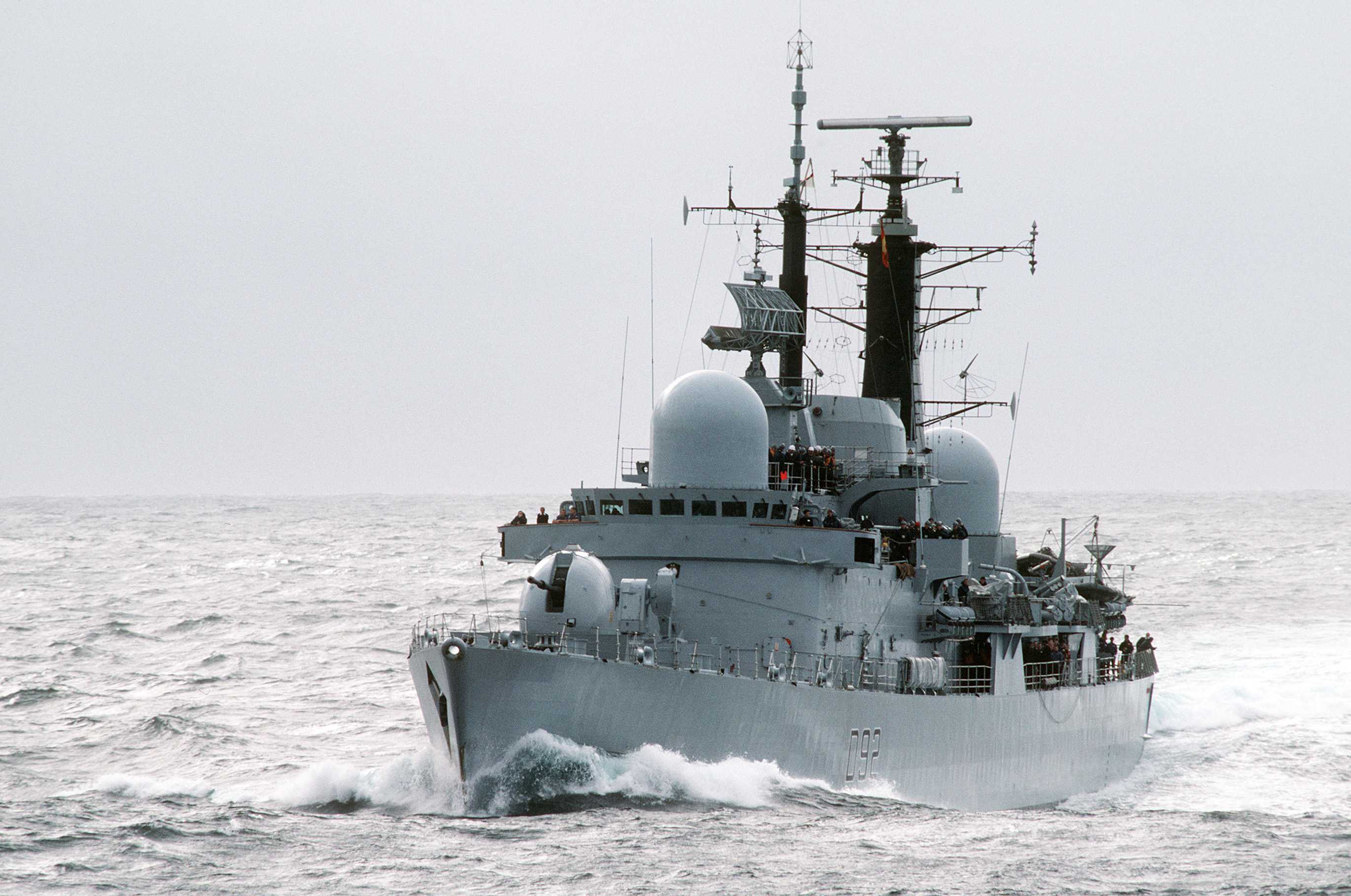
HMS Liverpool (D92)

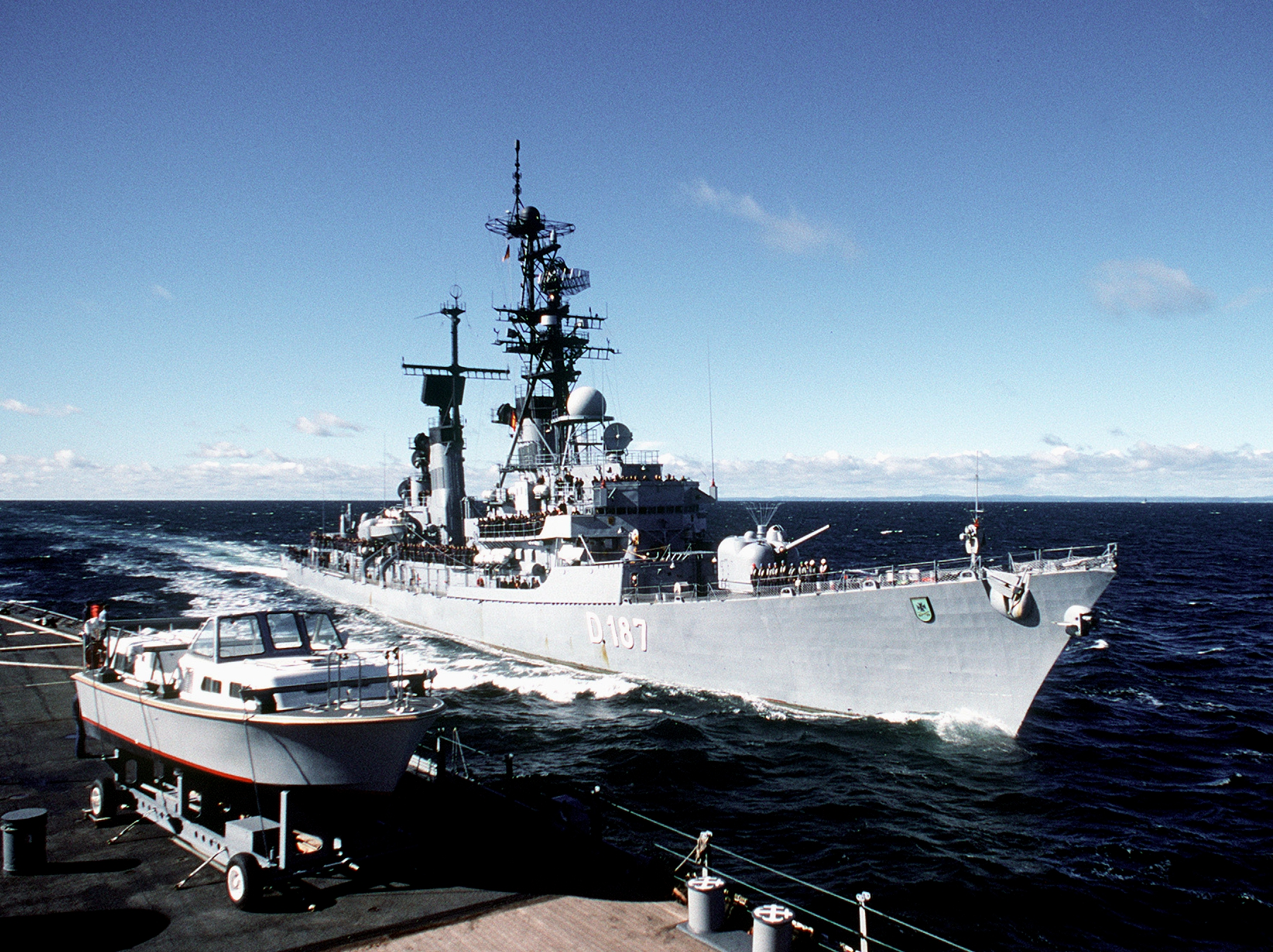
Rommel (D187)

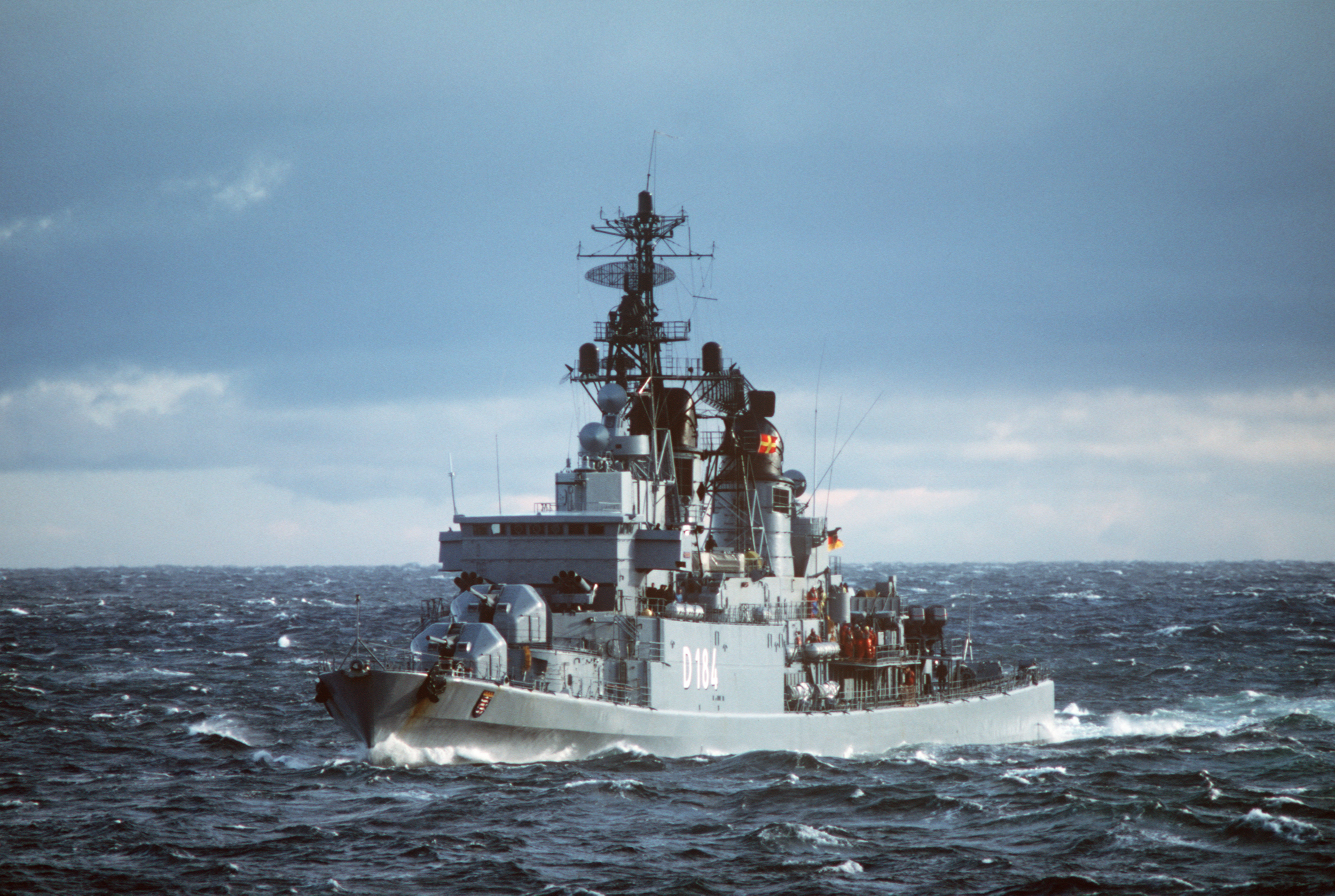
Hessen (D184)

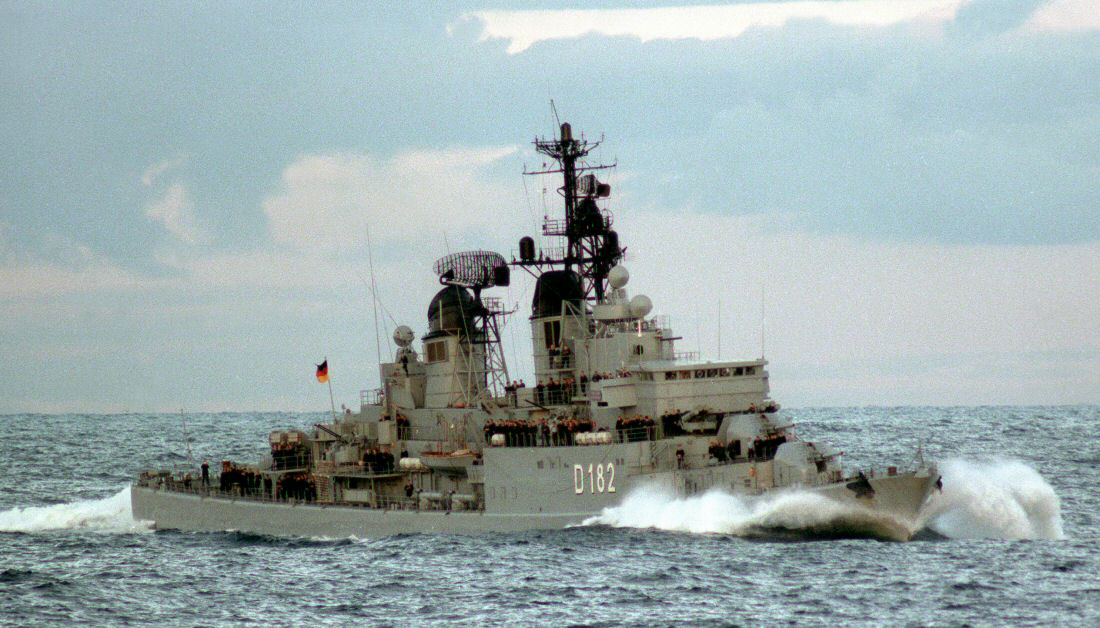
Schleswig-Holstein (D-182)

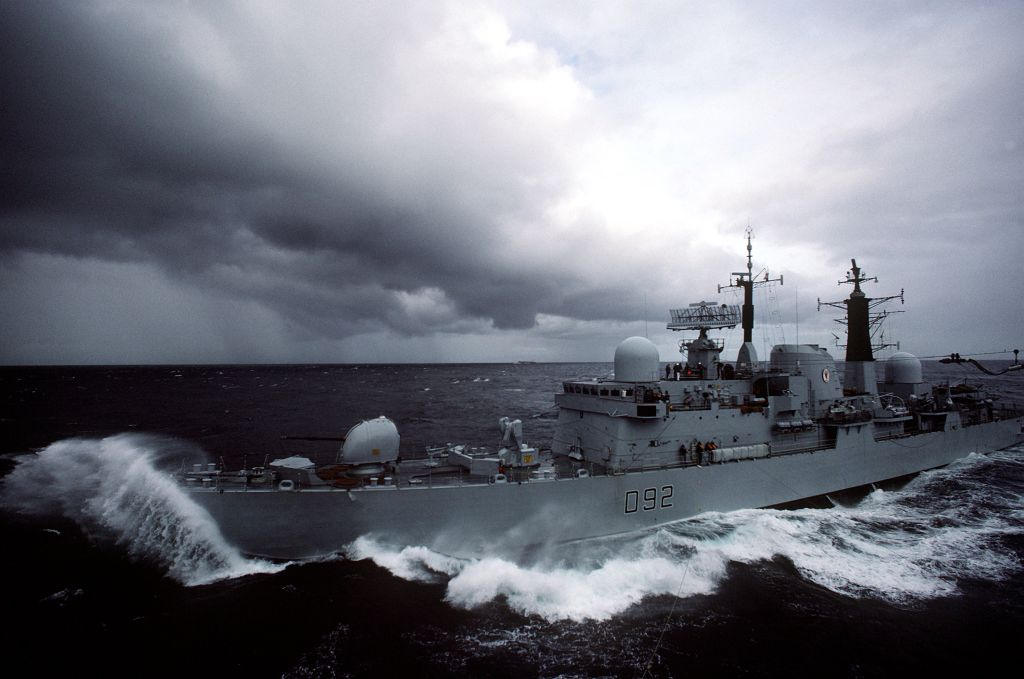
HMS Liverpool (D92)

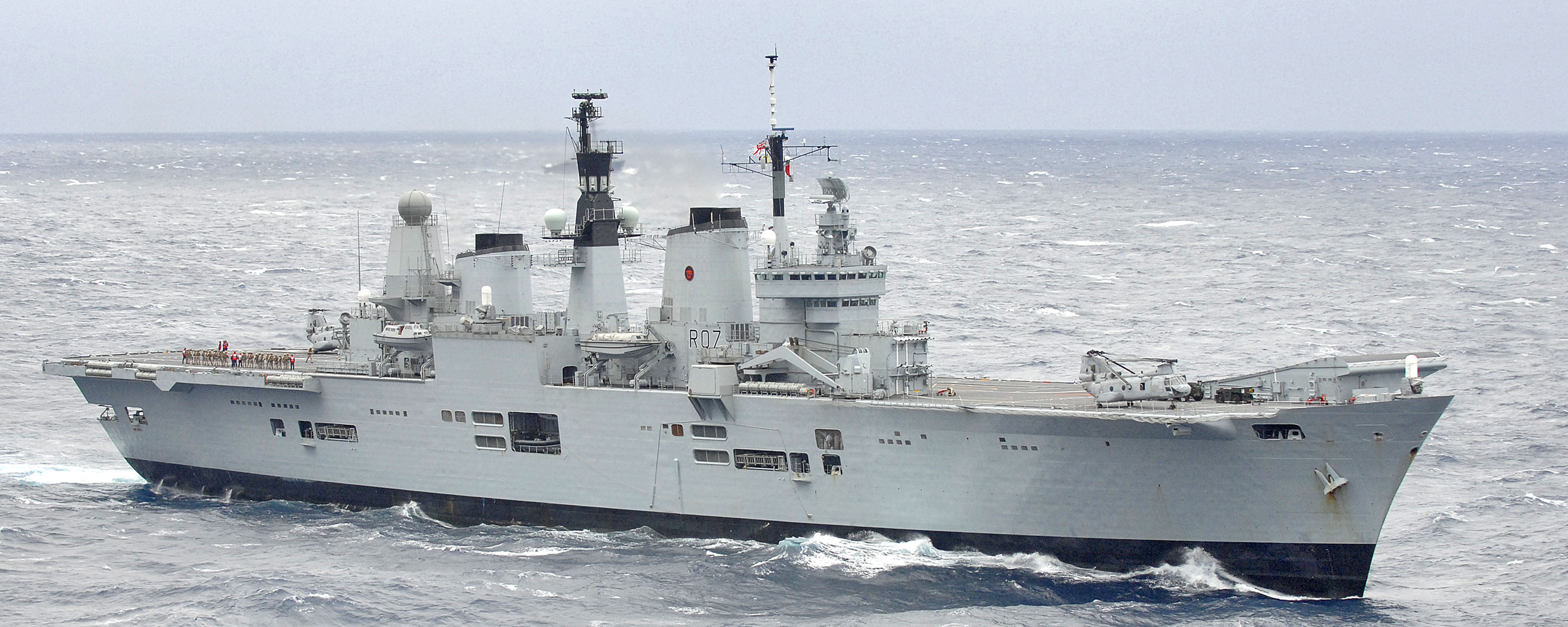
HMS Ark Royal
