= HNLMS Potvis =

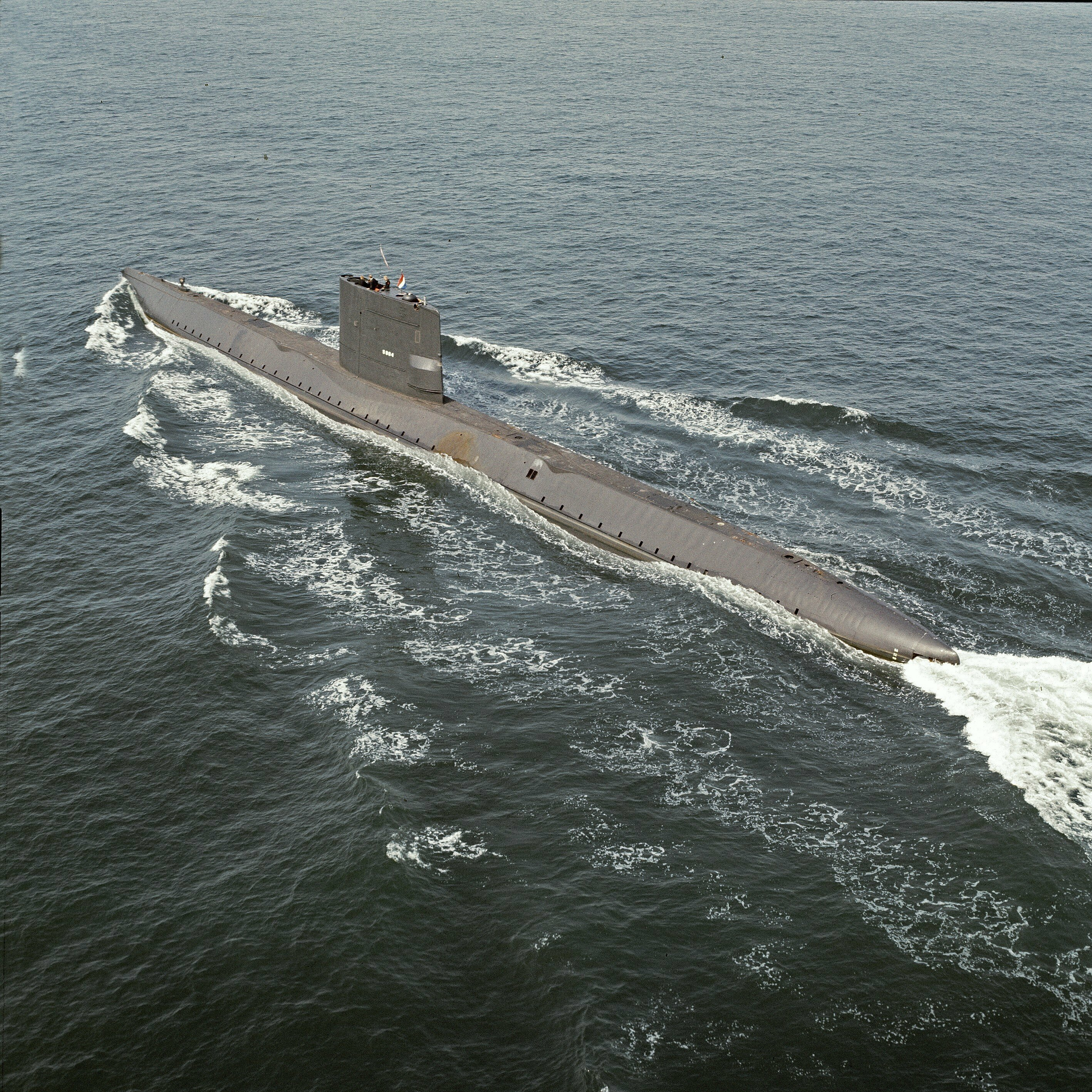
- Potvis

History

Netherlands
- Name: Potvis
- Namesake: Sperm whale
- Builder: Wilton-Fijenoord, Schiedam
- Laid down: 17 September 1962
- Launched: 12 January 1965
- Commissioned: 2 November 1965
- Decommissioned: 18 June 1992
- Identification: S 804
- Motto: Fearsome in battle
- Fate: Broken up and scrapped in 1994

General characteristics
- Class & type: Dolfijn-class submarine
- Displacement: 1140 tons standard; 1509 tons surfaced; 1831 tons submerged
- Length: 78.3 m (256 ft 11 in)
- Beam: 7.8 m (25 ft 7 in)
- Draught: 5 m (16 ft 5 in)
- Propulsion: 2 × 1,250 bhp (932 kW) diesel engines; 2 × 2,200 bhp (1,641 kW) electric motors
- Speed: 14.5 kn (26.9 km/h; 16.7 mph) surfaced; 17 kn (31 km/h; 20 mph) submerged
- Complement: 67
- Armament: 4 × 21 in (533 mm) bow torpedo tubes; 4 × 21 in stern torpedo tubes

Potvis (Dutch: Sperm whale) was a Potvis-class submarine (a modified Dolfijn-class submarine) of the Royal Netherlands Navy.

== Ship history ==
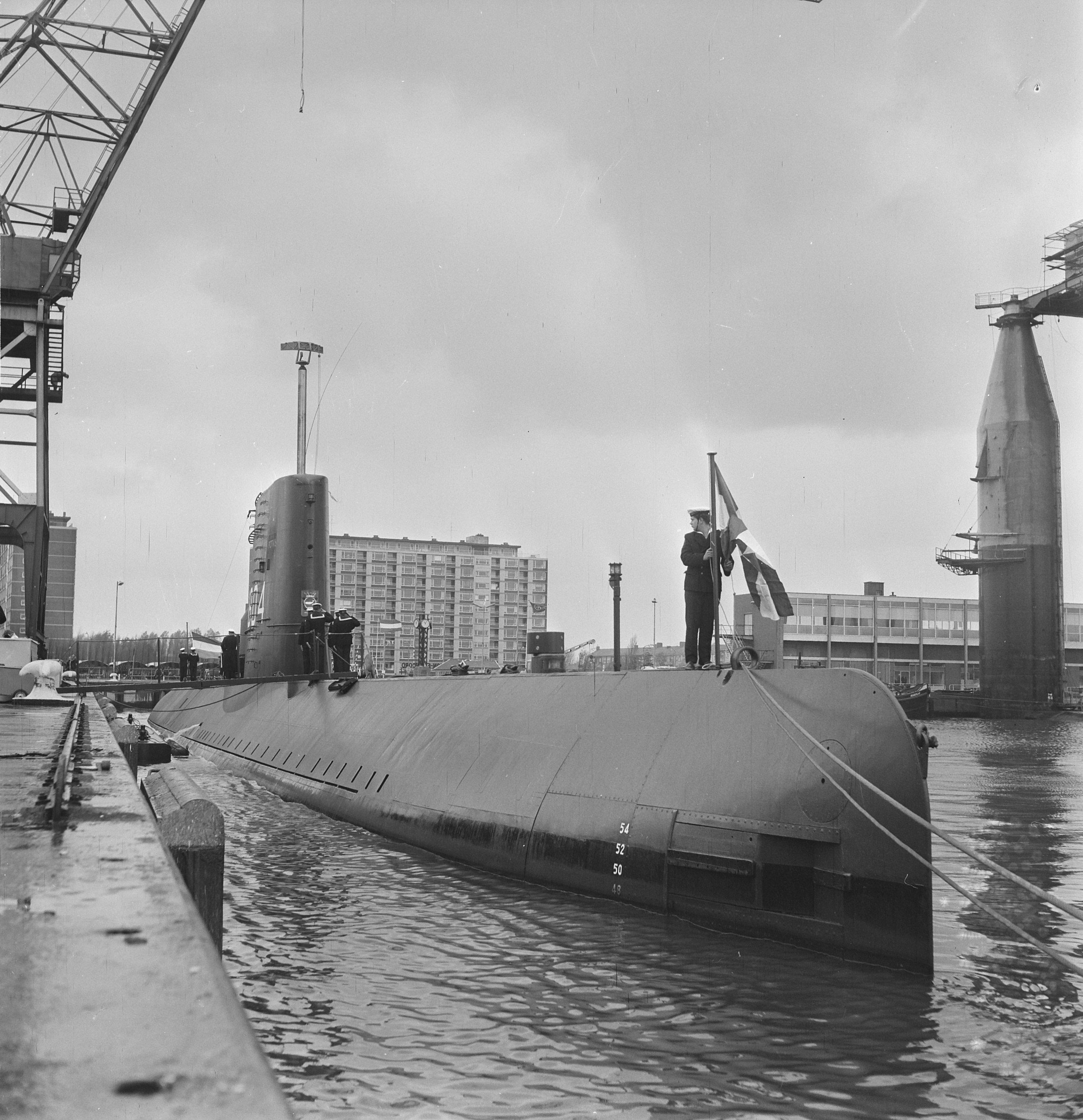
Potvis being commissioned in 1965

The submarine was laid down on 17 September 1962 at the Wilton-Fijenoord shipyard in Schiedam and launched on 12 January 1965. 2 November 1965 she was commissioned in the Dutch navy.

In January 1968 Potvis and Dolfijn left the port of Den Helder for a war simulation in the northern Atlantic Ocean that would last 5 weeks. The boat was overhauled in 1970 at the Wilton-Fijenoord shipyard. From October until November 1976 Potvis and the tender Mercuur perform torpedo system trials at Andros, Bahamas. From 2 to 21 July 1978 Potvis, Dolfijn, Zeehond and Zwaardvis practiced firing exercises.

On 19 November 1982 a refit of the boat started at the Naval Yard in Den Helder. This lasts until 8 August 1983. In 1984 she made a visit to Willemstad Curaçao. The following years she made several visits to Norway and Scotland.

On 18 June 1992 she was finally decommissioned and broken up 1994, wearing a special ceremony painting of a Sperm whale.
