= HNLMS Zwaardvis =

HNLMS Zwaardvis (S806)
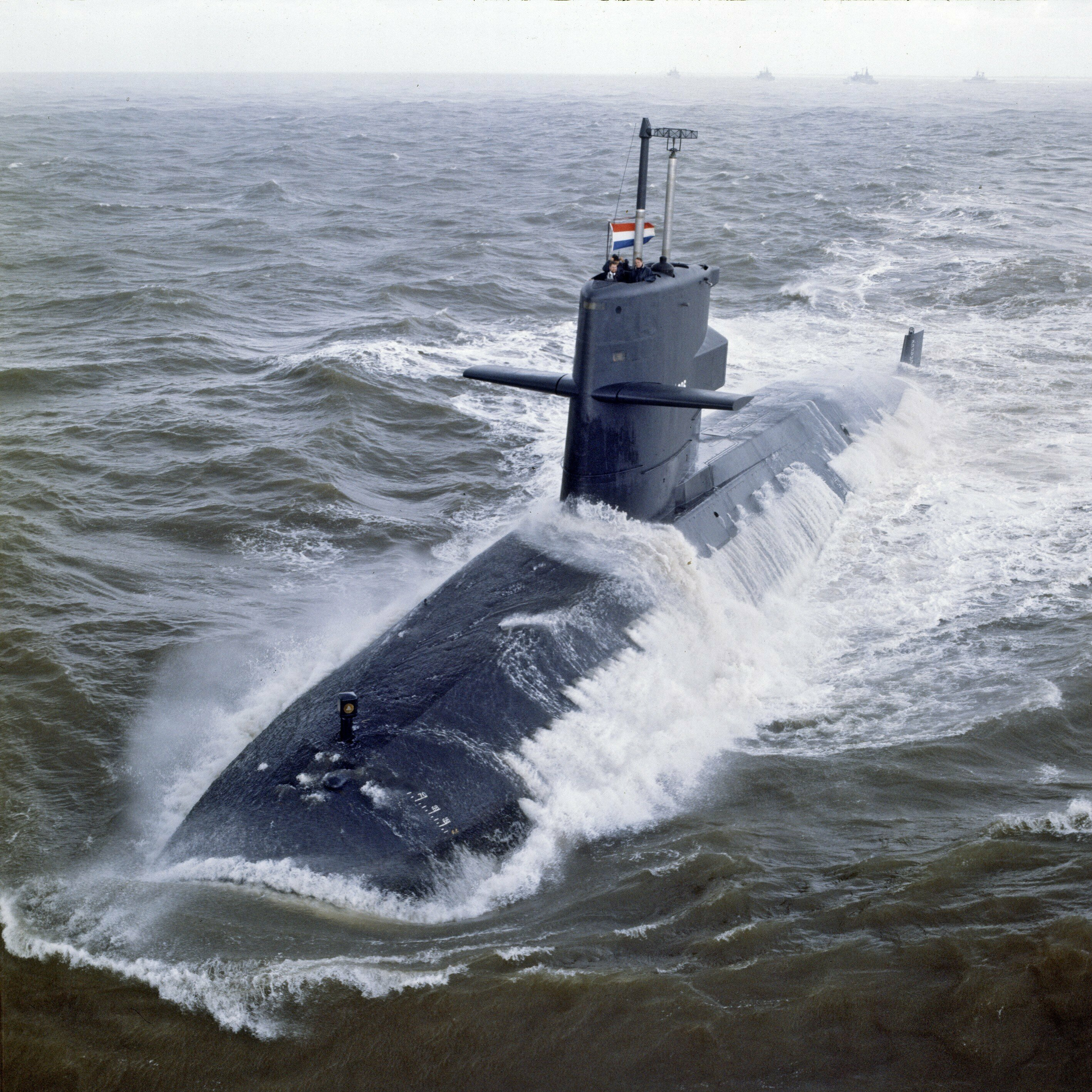
- HNLMS Zwaardvis

History

Netherlands
- Name: Zwaardvis
- Namesake: Swordfish
- Builder: Rotterdamsche Droogdok Maatschappij, Rotterdam
- Yard number: RDM-320
- Laid down: 14 July 1966
- Launched: 2 July 1970
- Commissioned: 18 August 1972
- Decommissioned: 1994
- Identification: S806
- Motto: Through struggle for freedom
- Fate: Scrapped, 2006

General characteristics *
- Class & type: Zwaardvis-class submarine
- Displacement: 2350 tons surfaced; 2620 tons submerged
- Length: 66.92 m (219 ft 7 in)
- Beam: 8.4 m (27 ft 7 in)
- Draught: 7.1 m (23 ft 4 in)
- Propulsion: 3 × diesel engines 4,200 shp (3,132 kW); 1 × 5,100 shp (3,803 kW) electric motor
- Speed: 13 kn (24 km/h; 15 mph) surfaced; 20 kn (37 km/h; 23 mph) submerged
- Complement: 65-67
- Armament: 6 × 21 in (533 mm) bow torpedo tubes

HNLMS Zwaardvis (S806) (Dutch pronunciation: [ˈzʋaːrtfɪs]; English: Swordfish) was a Zwaardvis-class submarine of the Royal Netherlands Navy.

== Ship history ==
The submarine was ordered 24 December 1965 and laid down on the 14th of July 1966 at the Rotterdamse Droogdok Maatschappij shipyard in Rotterdam. She was launched on 2 July 1970. On 21 September 1971 Zwaardvis completed its first trim dive. 18 August 1972 she was commissioned in the Dutch navy.

On Friday morning, August 18, 1972 the HNLMS Zwaardvis was transferred by RDM to the Royal Netherlands Navy and put into service. The ceremony took place at crane track 13, where the Dutch Navy's latest acquisition was moored. There were many high naval and civilian authorities among those who were interested and invited. Mrs J. den Toom - Niessink, who baptized the Zwaardvis on 2nd of July 1970, also gave an appearance at the time of commissioning. The first appointed commander of the Zwaardvis was LTZ1 B.G.A. Fanoy.

From August until September 1977 Zwaardvis, Dolfijn, the tender Mercuur and Onondaga performed torpedo firing exercises off the coast of the United Kingdom. From 2 to 21 July 1978 Zwaardvis, Dolfijn, Zeehond and Potvis practiced firing exercises.

In 1982 Zwaardvis took part in the Commander Submarine Sea Training at Faslane. During this period the boat was frequently used as enemy submarine target.

In 1985 the boat made several visits to Norway and participated in a NATO exercise. This exercise was held in the North Atlantic Ocean. The following year she made visits to Scotland and France. Near Crete an exercise called Fairwind 86 was held where Zwaardvis took part in. In 1986 visits are made to Scotland and Spain. The boat also participates in an exercise in the Strait of Gibraltar.

In 1989 a NATO exercise called North Star was held were the boat participated in. Visits to Scotland and Norway are made in 1991. The boat was decommissioned in 1994. Several countries expressed interest in buying the submarine but eventually no buyer was found. The Zwaardvis was scrapped in Malaysia in 2006.

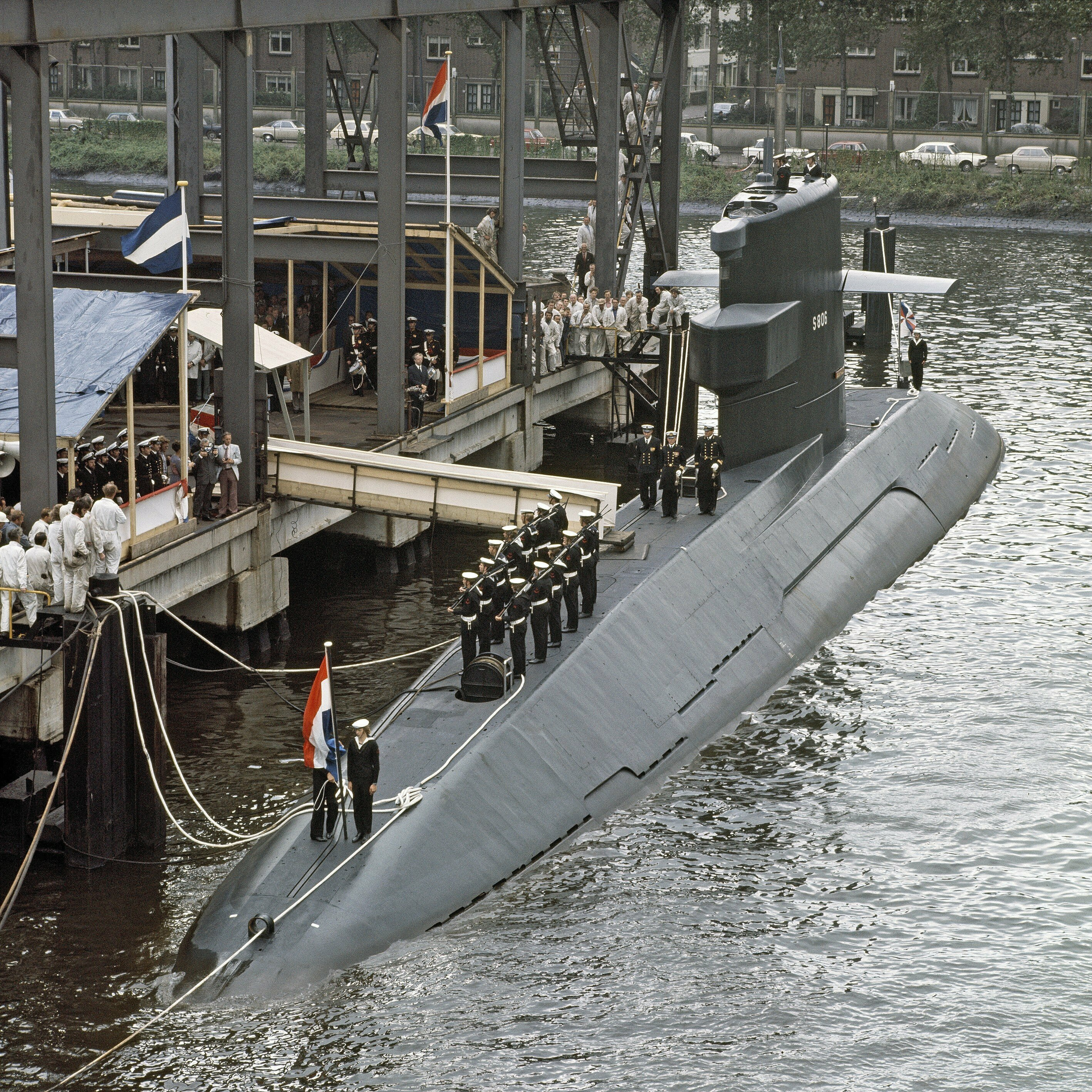
Formal commissioning ceremony for Zwaardvis held in 1972

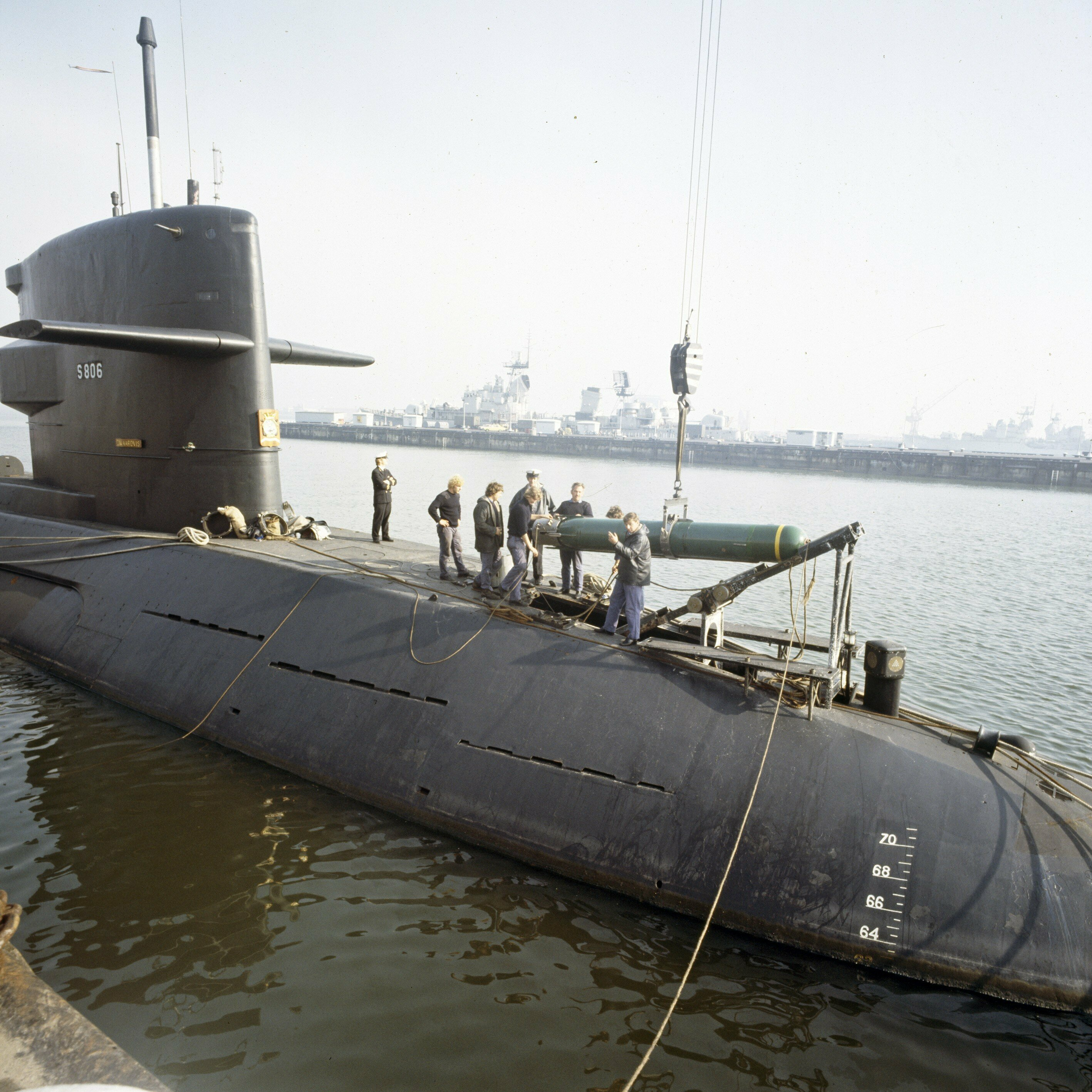
Zwaardvis being re-armed with torpedoes
