= Maximiliaan Frederik Gunning =

Dutch naval engineer (1895 - 1972)

- Born: 9 October 1895; Zwolle, Netherlands
- Died: 13 February 1972 (aged 76); Petersfield, England
- Occupation: Naval engineer

Maximiliaan Frederik "Max" Gunning (9 October 1895 – 13 February 1972) was a Dutch naval engineer who designed several warships for the Royal Netherlands Navy. He is known for designing the Dolfijn class submarines.

== Early life ==
Maximiliaan Frederik "Max" Gunning was born on 9 October 1895 in Zwolle, Netherlands, as the son of Johannes Hermanus Gunning and Cecilia van Eeghen. He was the eight and youngest son in the family.

== Designs ==
=== Schelde-Gunning submarine ===
The Schelde-Gunning submarine was a submarine design that Max Gunning developed while he was employed as chief of the naval shipbuilding department at Koninklijke Maatschappij De Schelde. While this design was offered to Portugal and Norway via a firm in Paris, none were actually built.

==== Portuguese tender ====
On 27 January 1931 a tender was sent to the Portuguese Department of the Navy for the construction of two submarines that were based on the Schelde-Gunning design. The two submarines had a mass of 755 tons while surfaced and 960 tons submerged. They measured 68.5 meters in length, had a beam of 5.2 meters and a draft of 4.4 meters. Furthermore, they were equipped with two diesel engines that could produce 900 brake horsepower, which allowed both submarines to reach a maximum speed of 17 knots.

=== Dolfijn class submarine ===
During the Second World War Gunning thought of a solution to supply food, ammunition and spare parts to allied troops on Malta. He became convinced that submarines with multiple pressure hulls could deliver more supplies than submarines with a single pressure hull and also the ships that managed to evade the enemy. However, before his submarine design could be realized the situation surrounding Malta changed and as a result his design was shelved. After the Second World War he used his ideas to develop the Dolfijn class submarine. The design of the Dolfijn class consisted of an outer hull in the general shape of a triangle, with three parallel pressure cylinders arranged inside the triangle.

== Bibliography ==
- de Bles, Harry; Boven, Graddy; Homburg, Leon (2006). Onderzeeboten! (in Dutch). Zaltbommel/Den Helder: Aprilis/Marinemuseum. ISBN 9059941306.
- Gardiner, Robert; Chumbley, Stephen; Budzbon, Przemysław, eds. (1995). Conway's All the World's Fighting Ships 1947–1995. Annapolis: Naval Institute Press. ISBN 1-55750-132-7.
- Grove, Eric J. (1990). NATO Major Warships: Europe. London: Tri-Service Press. ISBN 1-85400-006-3.
- Woudstra, F.G.A. (1982). Onze Koninklijke Marine (in Dutch). Alkmaar: De Alk. ISBN 90-6013-915-1.
