= HNLMS Tonijn =

Potvis-class submarine of the Royal Netherlands Navy

Coordinates: 52.963767139972134°N 4.771255536254262°E

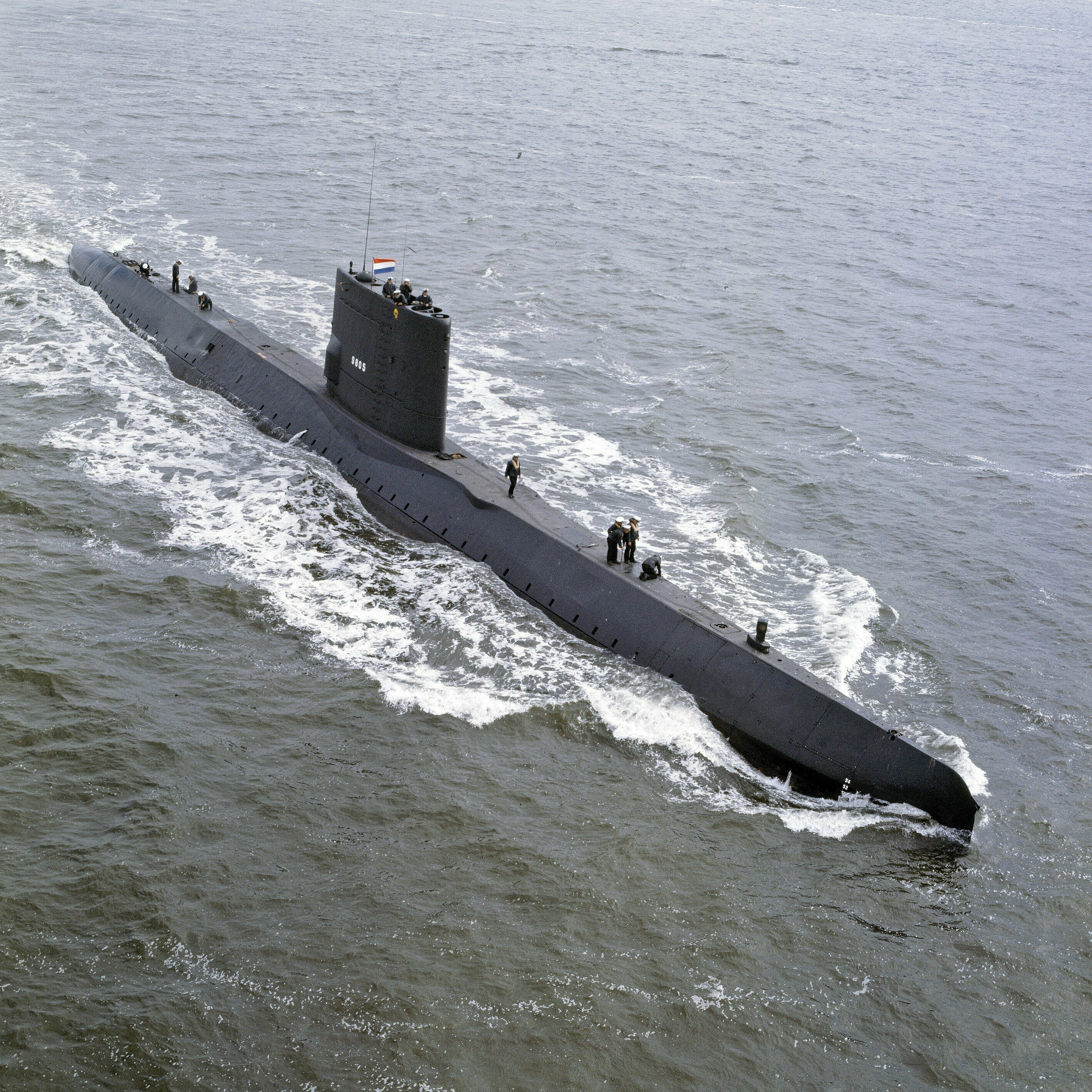
- HNLMS Tonijn underway

History

Netherlands
- Name: Tonijn
- Builder: Wilton-Fijenoord, Schiedam
- Laid down: 26 October 1962
- Launched: 14 June 1965
- Commissioned: 24 February 1966
- Decommissioned: 10 January 1991
- Status: Museum ship since summer 1994

General characteristics
- Class & type: Dolfijn-class submarine
- Displacement: 1140 tons standard; 1509 tons surfaced; 1831 tons submerged
- Length: 78.3 m (256 ft 11 in)
- Beam: 7.8 m (25 ft 7 in)
- Draught: 5 m (16 ft 5 in)
- Propulsion: 2 × 1,250 bhp (932 kW) diesel engines; 2 × 2,200 bhp (1,641 kW) electric motors
- Speed: 14.5 kn (26.9 km/h; 16.7 mph) surfaced; 17 kn (31 km/h; 20 mph) submerged
- Complement: 67
- Armament: 4 × 21 in (533 mm) bow torpedo tubes; 4 × 21 in stern torpedo tubes

HNLMS Tonijn (Dutch: Thunnus) was a Potvis-class submarine (modified Dolfijn class) of the Royal Netherlands Navy.

== Ship history ==
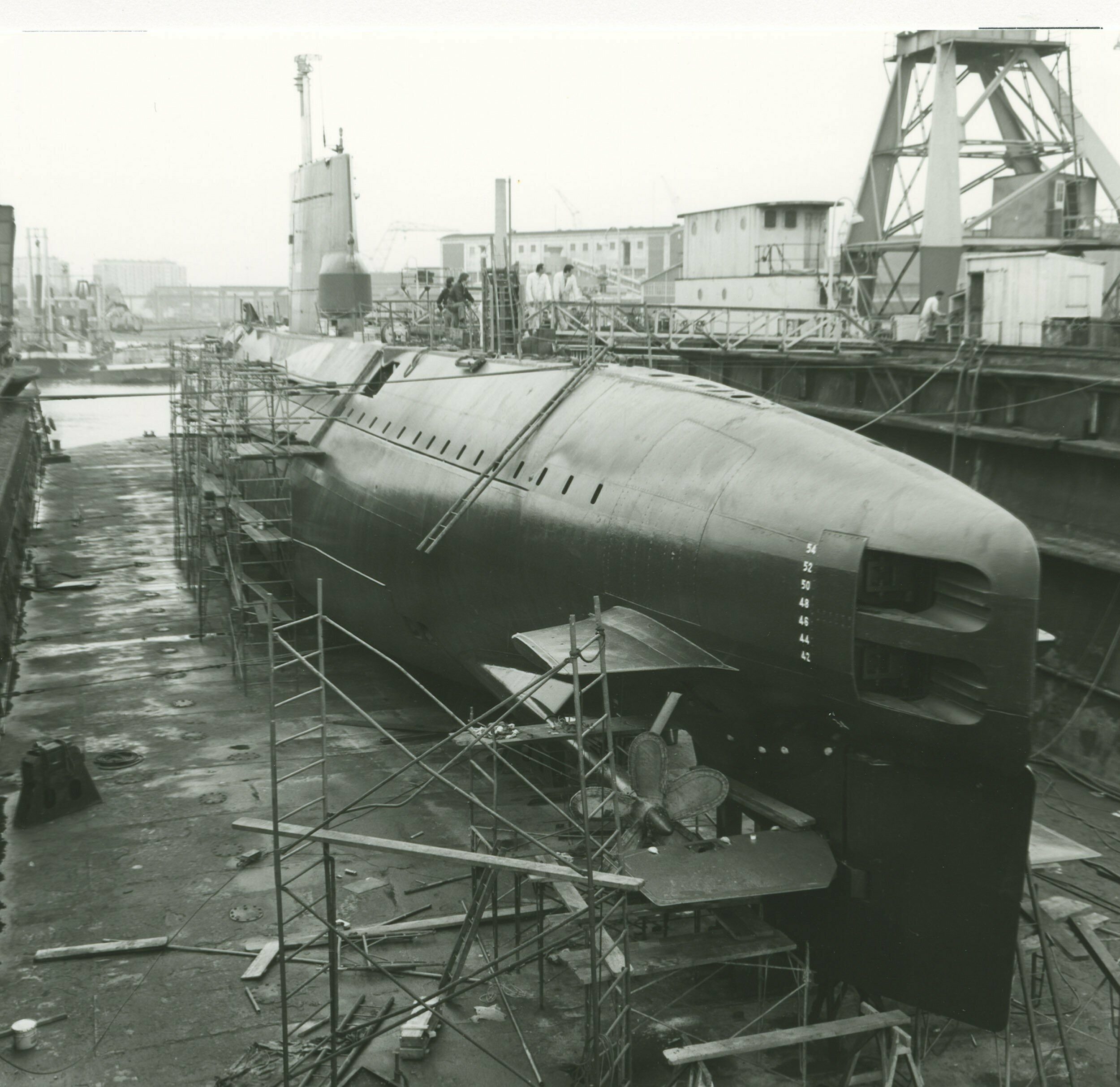
Tonijn in dry dock undergoing repairs, 1973.

The submarine was laid down on 26 October 1962 at the Wilton-Fijenoord shipyard in Schiedam and launched on 14 June 1965. 24 February 1966 she was commissioned in the Dutch navy.

While on exercise northwest of Ireland, she received the news that the submarine Walrus had gone missing. Tonijn participated in the search for the boat on 16 December 1968. It turned out Walrus was not lost but had lost radio contact due to a malfunction. From 18 to 28 July 1976 Tonijn made a visit to Kiel to participate in the Kieler Woche. Later that year she visited Dublin from 11 to 14 September. In 1978 Tonijn was docked at the shipyard of RDM for maintenance.

In September 1979 after fires broke out in the port engine room and starboard engine room USS Harlan County assisted in towing the boat to Gibraltar. The boat was in serious trouble as she also suffered from battery depletion that was performed at the time the fires broke out leaving the boat with 10% battery power.

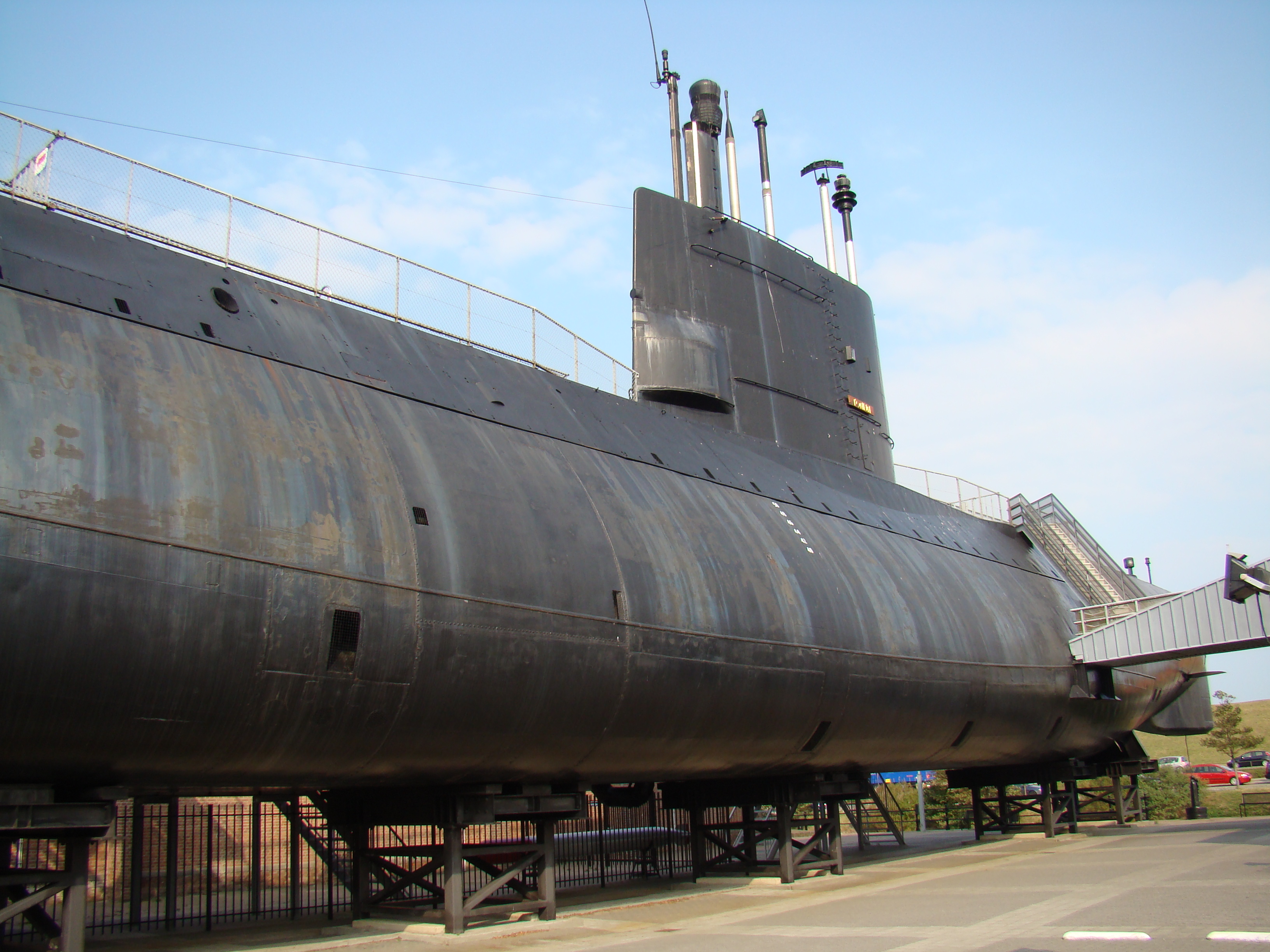
Tonijn as a museum ship after her retirement

On 16 October a refit of the boat began at a dry-docked in Rotterdam. This lasted until 11 December 1979. In 1984 the boat participated in an exercise at Zeebrugge with HNLMS Van Speijk and the Wielingen. The boat made a trip to Norway in 1990 and later that year to Scotland.

On 10 January 1991 the boat was decommissioned. Tonijn is preserved as a museum boat at the Dutch Navy Museum in Den Helder and open to the public since the summer of 1994.
