= HNLMS Zeehond (S809) =

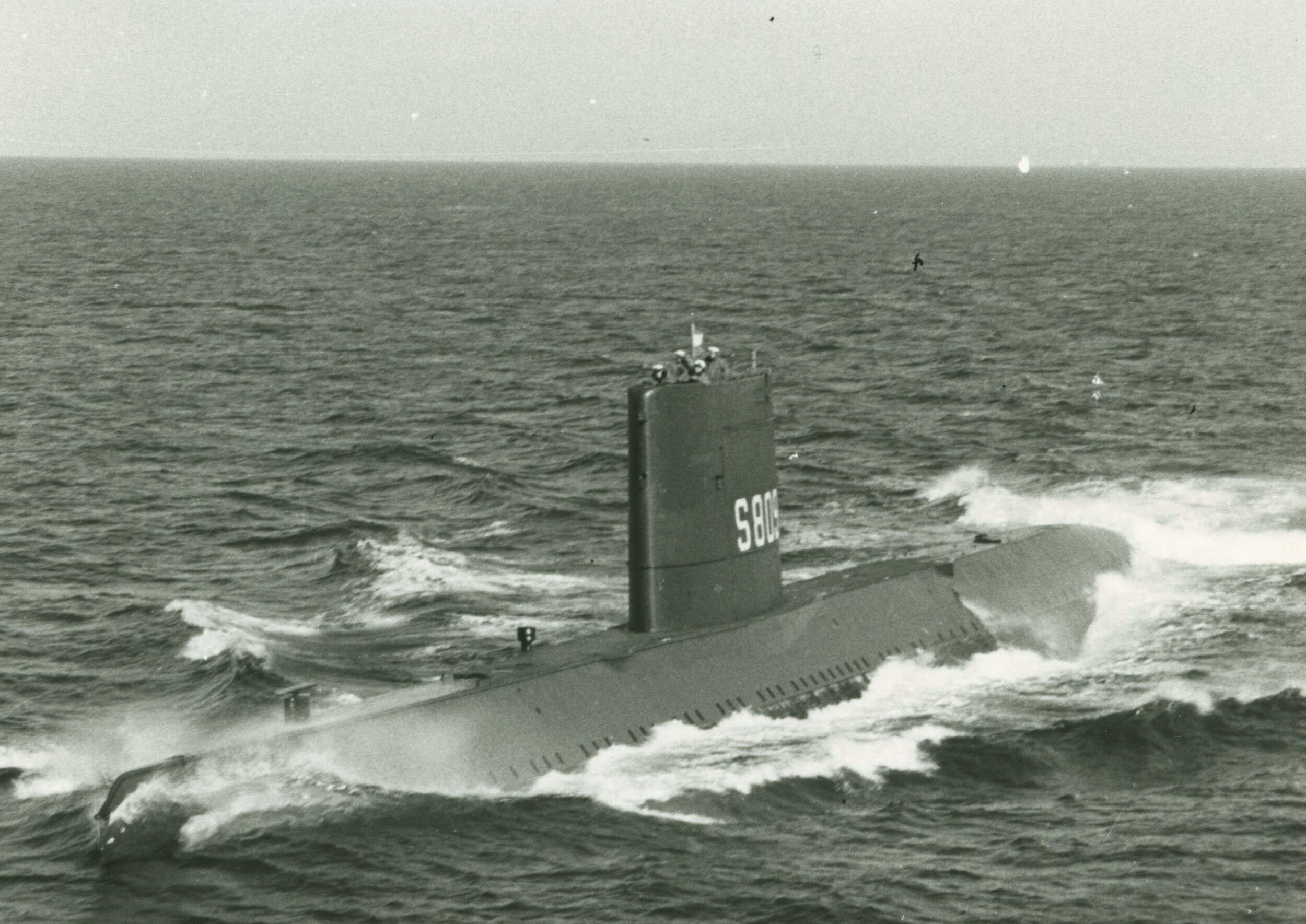
- Zeehond in the North Sea, 1962

History

Netherlands
- Name: Zeehond
- Builder: Rotterdamsche Droogdok Maatschappij, Rotterdam
- Laid down: 30 December 1954
- Launched: 20 February 1960
- Commissioned: 16 March 1961
- Decommissioned: 11 January 1990
- Fate: Scrapped 1997

General characteristics
- Class & type: Dolfijn-class submarine
- Displacement: 1140 tons standard; 1530 tons surfaced; 1830 tons submerged
- Length: 79.5 m (260 ft 10 in)
- Beam: 7.8 m (25 ft 7 in)
- Draught: 4.8 m (15 ft 9 in)
- Propulsion: 2 × 1,250 bhp (932 kW) diesel engines; 2 × 2,200 bhp (1,641 kW) electric motors
- Speed: 14.5 kn (26.9 km/h; 16.7 mph) surfaced; 17 kn (31 km/h; 20 mph) submerged
- Complement: 67
- Armament: 4 × 21 in (533 mm) bow torpedo tubes; 4 × 21 in stern torpedo tubes

Zeehond (Dutch: Seal) was a Dolfijn-class submarine of the Royal Netherlands Navy.

== Ship history ==
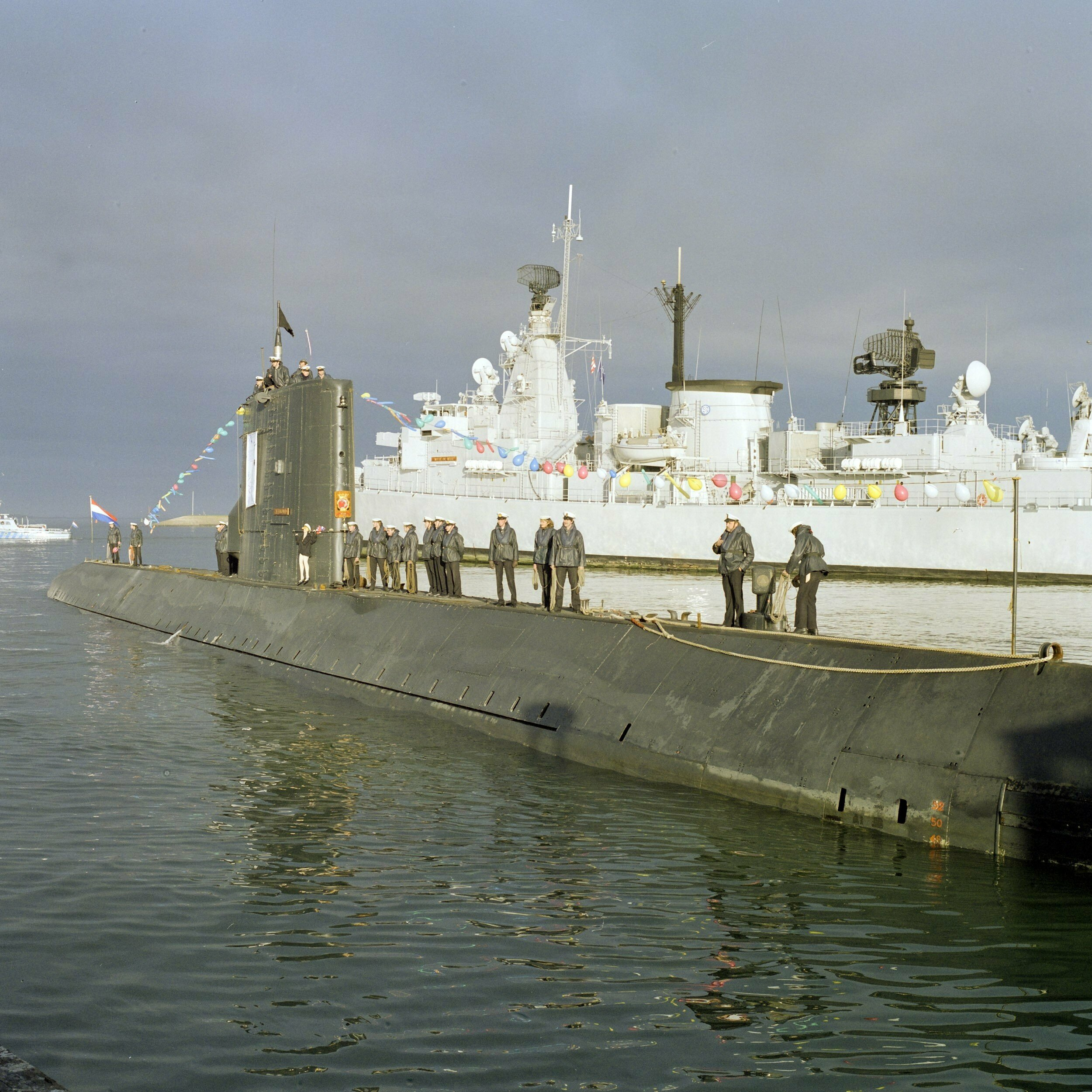
Zeehond in December 1989, just prior to her retirement

The submarine was laid down on 30 December 1954 at the Rotterdamse Droogdok Mij shipyard in Rotterdam and launched on 20 February 1960. 16 March 1961 she was commissioned in the Dutch navy.

In November 1963 the boat was visited by the than Princess Beatrix of the Netherlands. Between 1966 and 1967 Zeehond was modernized. In 1970 the boat made two trips to Scotland and a trip to France where her sonar was adjusted in Lorient. In January 1971 repairs on her propulsion are performed at the dry-dock of the Rotterdamse Droogdok Mij. After that she practices with her sister Dolfijn in the Bay of Biscay. Later that year in February she exercises of the Orkney, Shetland and Faroe Islands. Also a trip to the United States was made that year. The boat practiced with the surface fleet in January 1972. In October 1976 the boat made a visit to Dundee.

From 2 to 21 July 1978 Zeehond, Dolfijn, Potvis and Zwaardvis practiced firing exercises. In 1980 the boat made a trip to the Mediterranean Sea that lasted three months. On 11 January 1990 the Zeehond was de decommissioned. December 1997 the boat was scrapped at the yard of the Rotterdamse Droogdok Mij.
