= HNLMS Dolfijn (S808) =

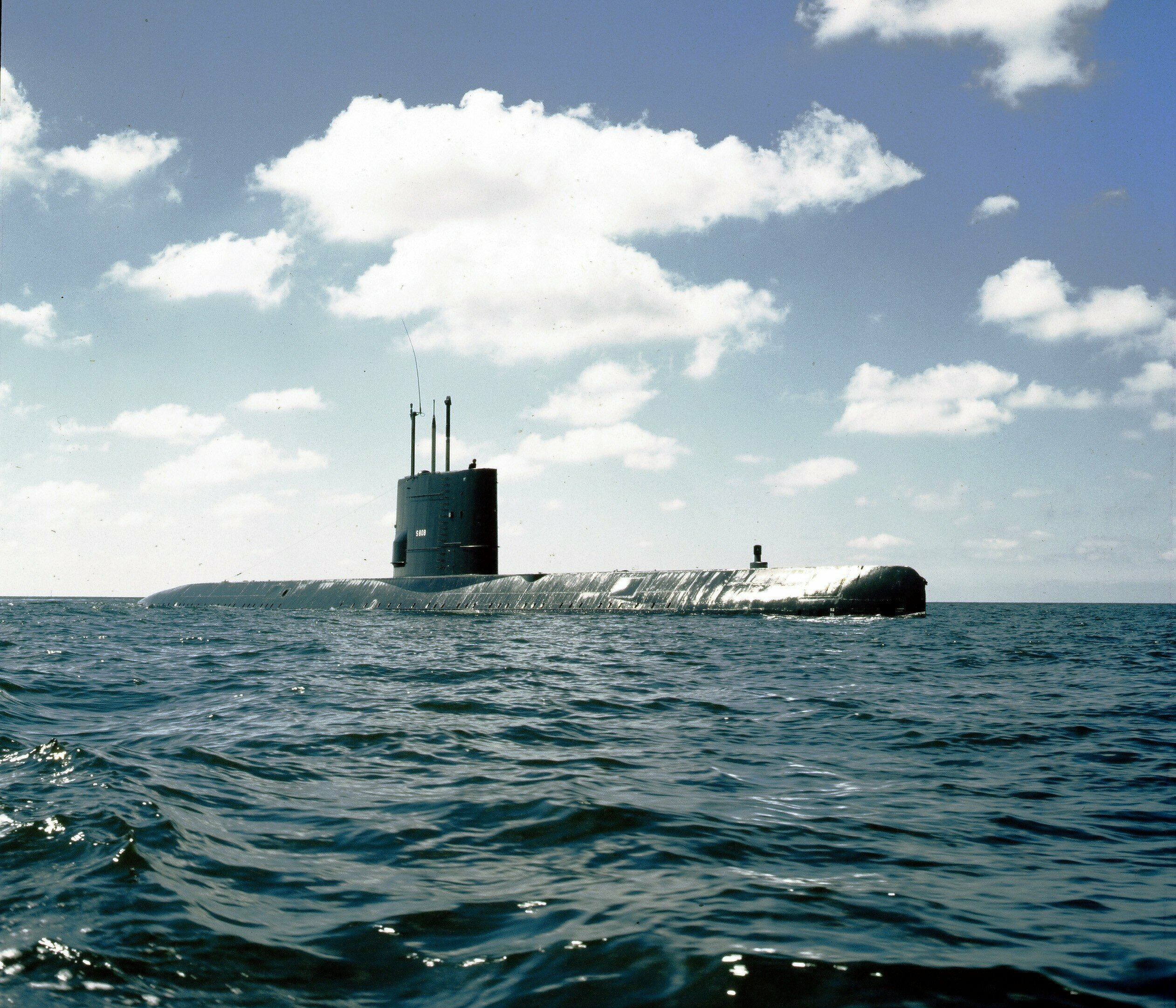
- Dolfijn

History

Netherlands
- Name: Dolfijn
- Namesake: Dolphin
- Builder: Rotterdamsche Droogdok Maatschappij, Rotterdam
- Yard number: RDM-279
- Laid down: 30 December 1954
- Launched: 20 May 1959
- Commissioned: 16 December 1960
- Decommissioned: 29 April 1982
- Identification: S 808
- Motto: I will go first
- Fate: Sold for scrap 1985

General characteristics
- Class & type: Dolfijn-class submarine
- Displacement: 1140 tons standard; 1530 tons surfaced; 1830 tons submerged
- Length: 79.5 m (260 ft 10 in)
- Beam: 7.8 m (25 ft 7 in)
- Draught: 4.8 m (15 ft 9 in)
- Propulsion: 2 × 1,250 bhp (932 kW) diesel engines; 2 × 2,200 bhp (1,641 kW) electric motors
- Speed: 14.5 kn (26.9 km/h; 16.7 mph) surfaced; 17 kn (31 km/h; 20 mph) submerged
- Complement: 67
- Armament: 4 × 21 in (533 mm) bow torpedo tubes; 4 × 21 in stern torpedo tubes

HNLMS Dolfijn (Dutch: Dolphin) was a Dolfijn-class submarine of the Royal Netherlands Navy.

== Ship history ==
The submarine was laid down on 30 December 1954 at the Rotterdamse Droogdok Mij shipyard in Rotterdam and launched on 20 May 1959. 16 December 1960 she was commissioned in the Dutch navy.

In March 1962 the boat and Zeeleeuw where send to the west coast of the US to show the flag. After this Dolfijn, Zeeleeuw and a number of destroyers were sent to Netherlands New Guinea because of rising tension between the Netherlands and Indonesia. When the situation calmed down, she returned to the Netherlands. In 1963 Toulouse was visited for testing of a new type of torpedo tube. In May 1964 Dolfijn participated in an exercise called Long Look held between Canada and Greenland. The next year, on 4 March 1965, Dolfijn was docked at the shipyard of RDM for modernization, which lasted till 15 February 1967. In January 1968 Dolfijn and Potvis left the port of Den Helder for a war simulation in the northern Atlantic Ocean that would last 5 weeks.

In May 1970 an international exercise called Rusty Nut is held where the boat participated in. Later that year in September she participated in the NATO exercise Northern Wedding. In early 1971 she practiced with her sister Zeehond in the Bay of Biscay. In September 1976 she participated in the NATO exercise Team Work. In July 1978 Dolfijn, Zeehond, Potvis and Zwaardvis practiced firing exercises. The next year, between 29 March 1979 and 26 November 1979, Dolfijn was docked at the shipyard of RDM for maintenance.

In July 1976 Dolfijn, together with the frigates Tromp, Van Nes, Van Galen, the destroyers Holland, Zeeland and the replenishment ship Poolster visited New York in commemoration of the city's 200 years anniversary.

On 29 April 1982 the boat was decommissioned. On 22 July 1985 the boat was sold to be scrapped at the yard of the Heuvelman in Puttershoek.
