= Dolfijn-class submarine =

Dutch Royal Navy submarine class

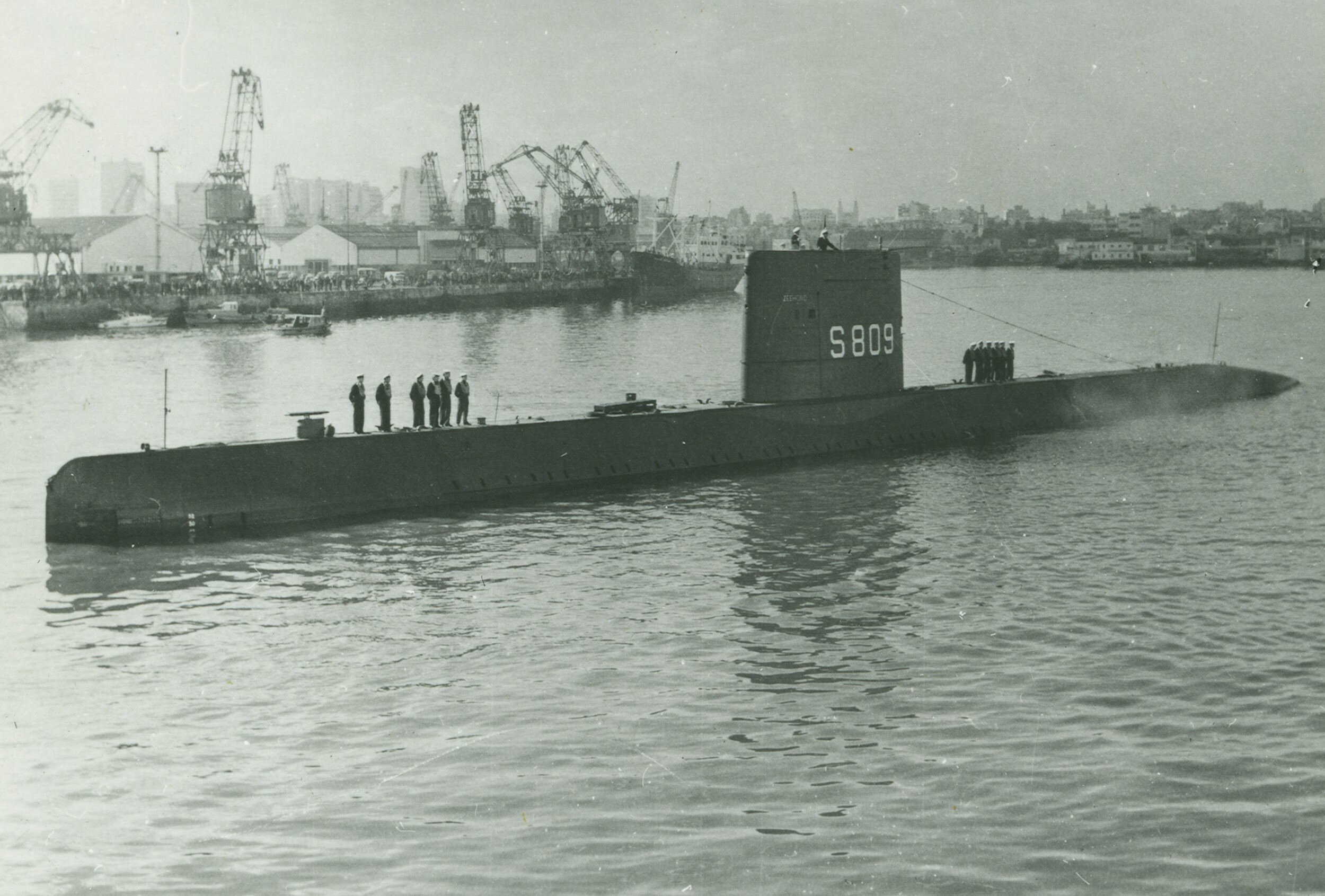
- The Dutch submarine HNLMS Zeehond

Class overview
- Name: Dolfijn class
- Builders: Rotterdamsche Droogdok Maatschappij & Wilton-Fijenoord
- Operators: Royal Netherlands Navy
- Preceded by: O 21 class; Zwaardvisch class
- Succeeded by: Walrus class
- Subclasses: Potvis class
- Built: 1954–1966
- In service: 1960–1992
- Completed: 4
- Retired: 4
- Preserved: 1

General characteristics
- Type: Submarine
- Displacement: 1,530 tons (surfaced); 1,826 tons (submerged)
- Length: 79.5 m (261 ft)
- Beam: 7.8 m (26 ft)
- Draught: 5.0 m (16.4 ft)
- Propulsion: 2 shafts, diesel electric. 2 MAN type diesels (2800 hp) and two electric motors 4000 hp
- Speed: 14.5 kn (26.9 km/h; 16.7 mph) (surfaced); 17 kn (31 km/h; 20 mph) (submerged)
- Complement: 67
- Sensors & processing systems: Radar type 1001, Sonar: passive and active
- Armament: 8 x 533 mm (21 inch torpedo tubes) 4 bow, 4 stern, 16–22 torpedoes, fitted for minelaying via torpedo tubes

The Dolfijn-class submarines of the Royal Netherlands Navy are a class of four submarines; Dolfijn, Zeehond, Potvis and Tonijn. They were built in the late 1950s and the early 1960s. They were the first indigenous submarines built in the Netherlands and for the Royal Netherlands Navy after World War II. In the Netherlands they are also known as "three cylinder" submarines. They formed the backbone of the Royal Netherlands Navy Submarine Service during most of the Cold War.

== History ==
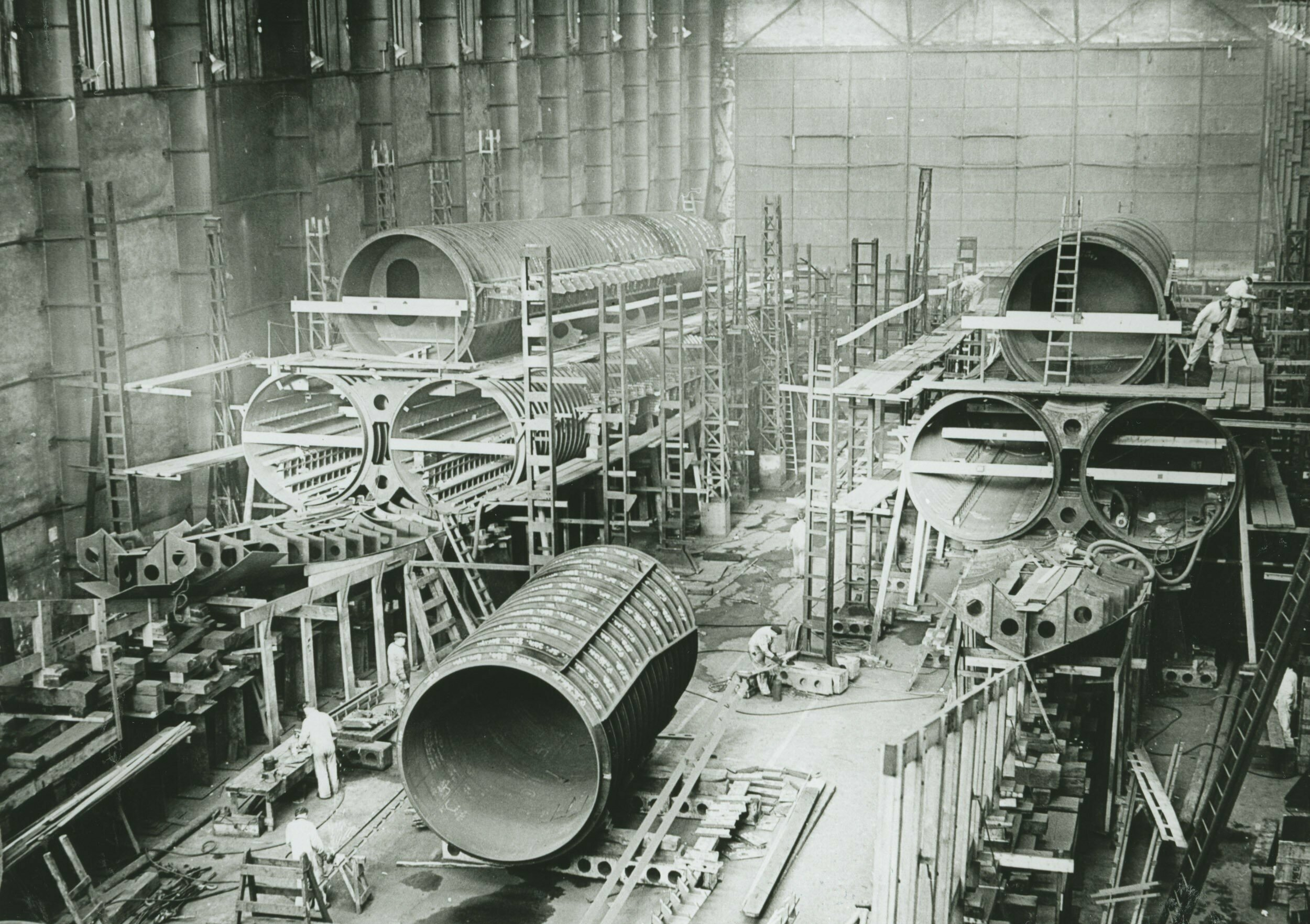
Dolfijn-class ships Dolfijn (left) and Zeehond (right) under construction in 1956.

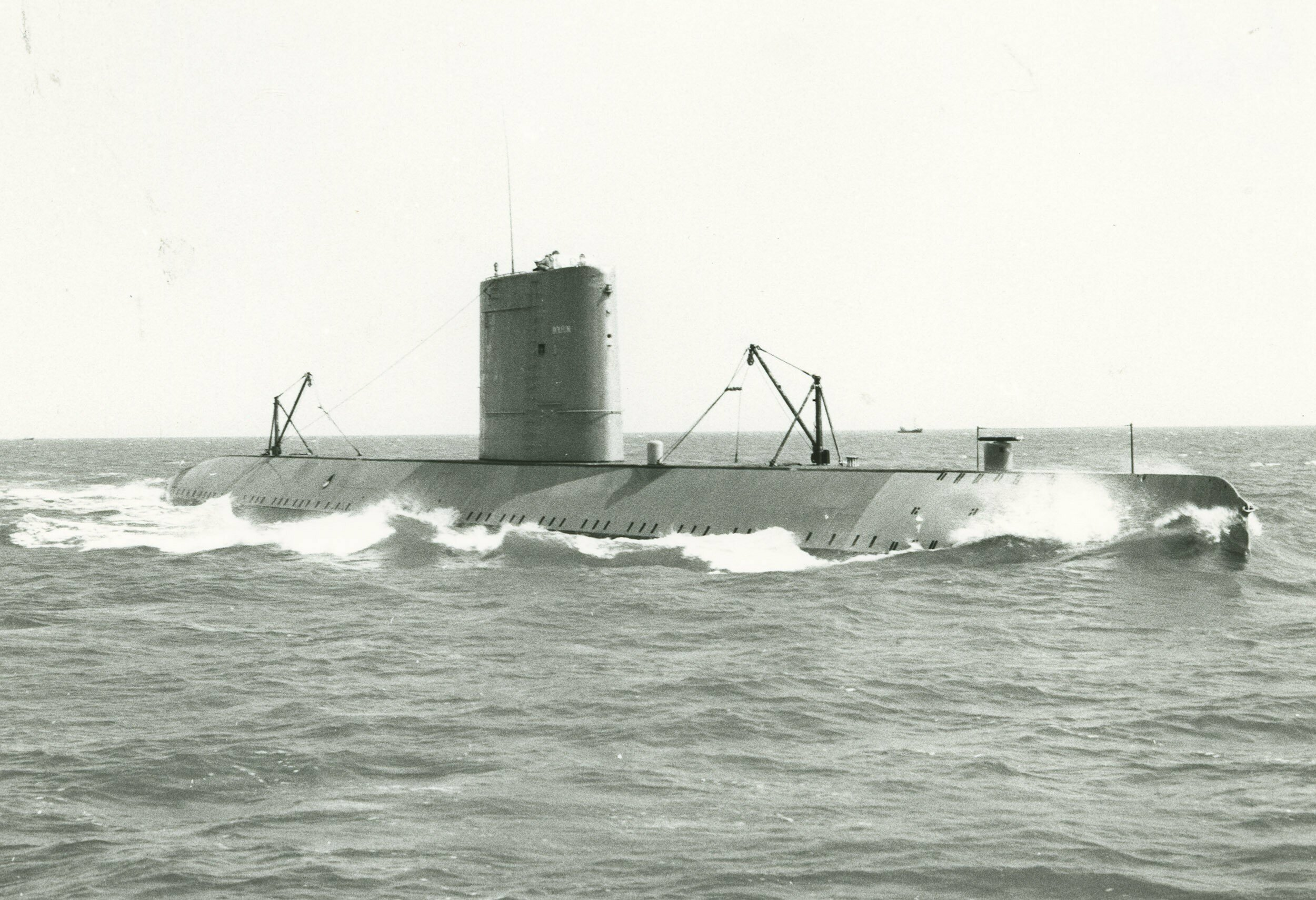
Dolfijn undergoing sea trials in 1960.

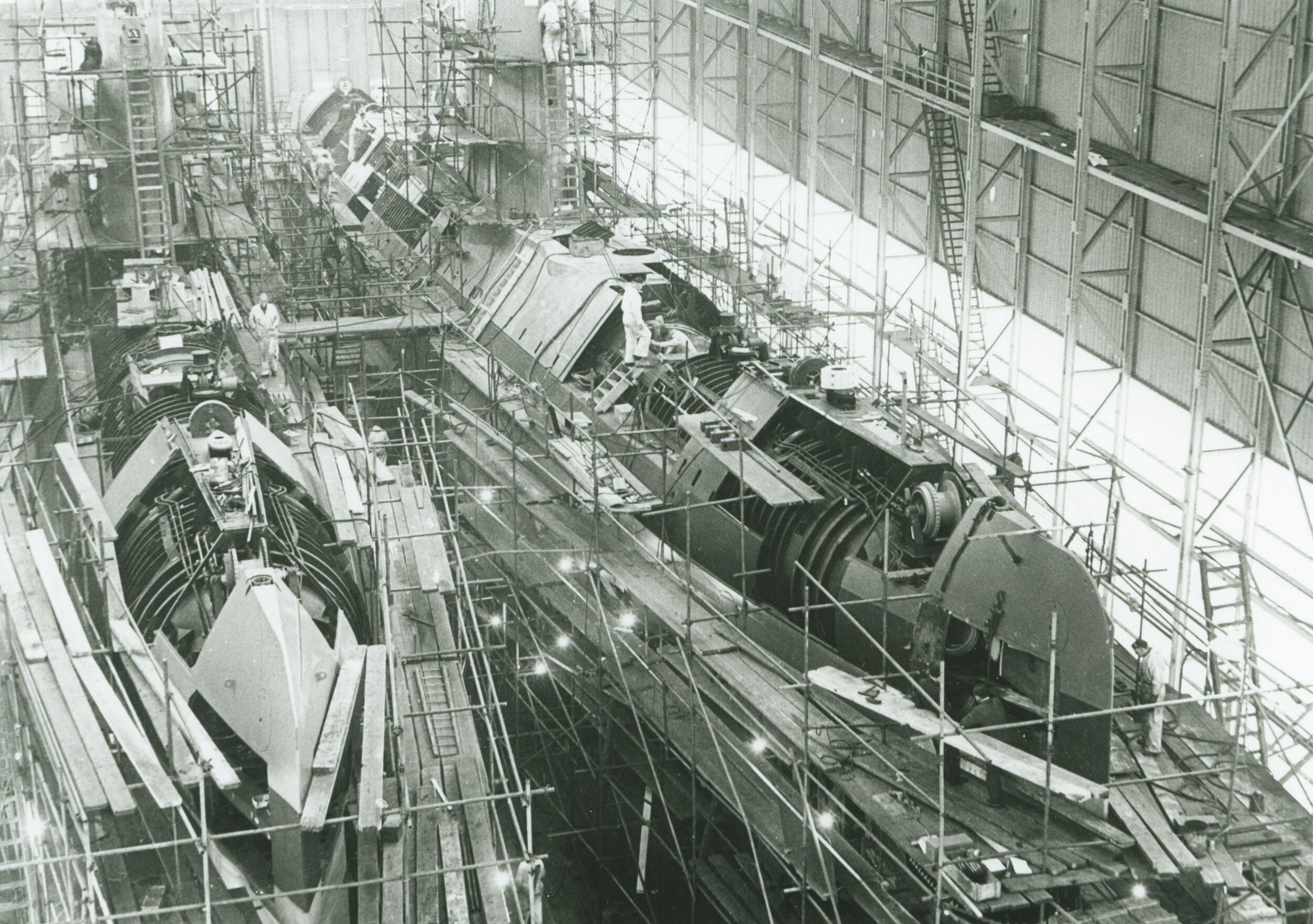
Potvis and Tonijn nearing completion at Wilton's Dok- en Werf Maatschappij, 1964.

The Second World War had a big impact on the Royal Netherlands Navy and especially on the Royal Netherlands Navy Submarine Service. Many submarines were lost during the war and only eight were left of the twenty submarines that the Dutch submarine service had at the beginning of the war. In addition, these remaining submarines were either in bad condition due to extensive use or they were simply outdated. To boost its submarine fleet the Royal Netherlands Navy managed to acquire several surplus submarines from Great Britain and the United States, however, this was only a temporary solution to the problems and more needed to be done to secure strengthen the Royal Netherlands Navy Submarine Service. To this end, the Submarine Service spent the first years after the Second World War making plans and designs to rebuild the Dutch submarine fleet. This was hard because the last indigenous design was made sometime before the Second World War started and in the meanwhile there had been many developments, so there was a lot of catch up to do for the Dutch navy. A result of this was that during the designing phase for the new submarines the requirements constantly changed to fit in new research, developments and innovations. Meanwhile, there were conflicting ideas over the new submarines design with engineer De Munter making a case for a submarine with a single pressure hull and Max F. Gunning wanting to push through a Three-Cylinder design which consisted of three separate pressure hulls. Nonetheless, both designs were a massive leap forward in comparison to the submarines in service at the time with the Royal Netherlands Navy and those that were earlier in Dutch service. However, eventually the Three-Cylinder design of Max F. Gunning was chosen for the new boats, mainly because the design made it possible for submarines to be able to dive 200 meters deep and stay under water much longer than other Dutch designs.

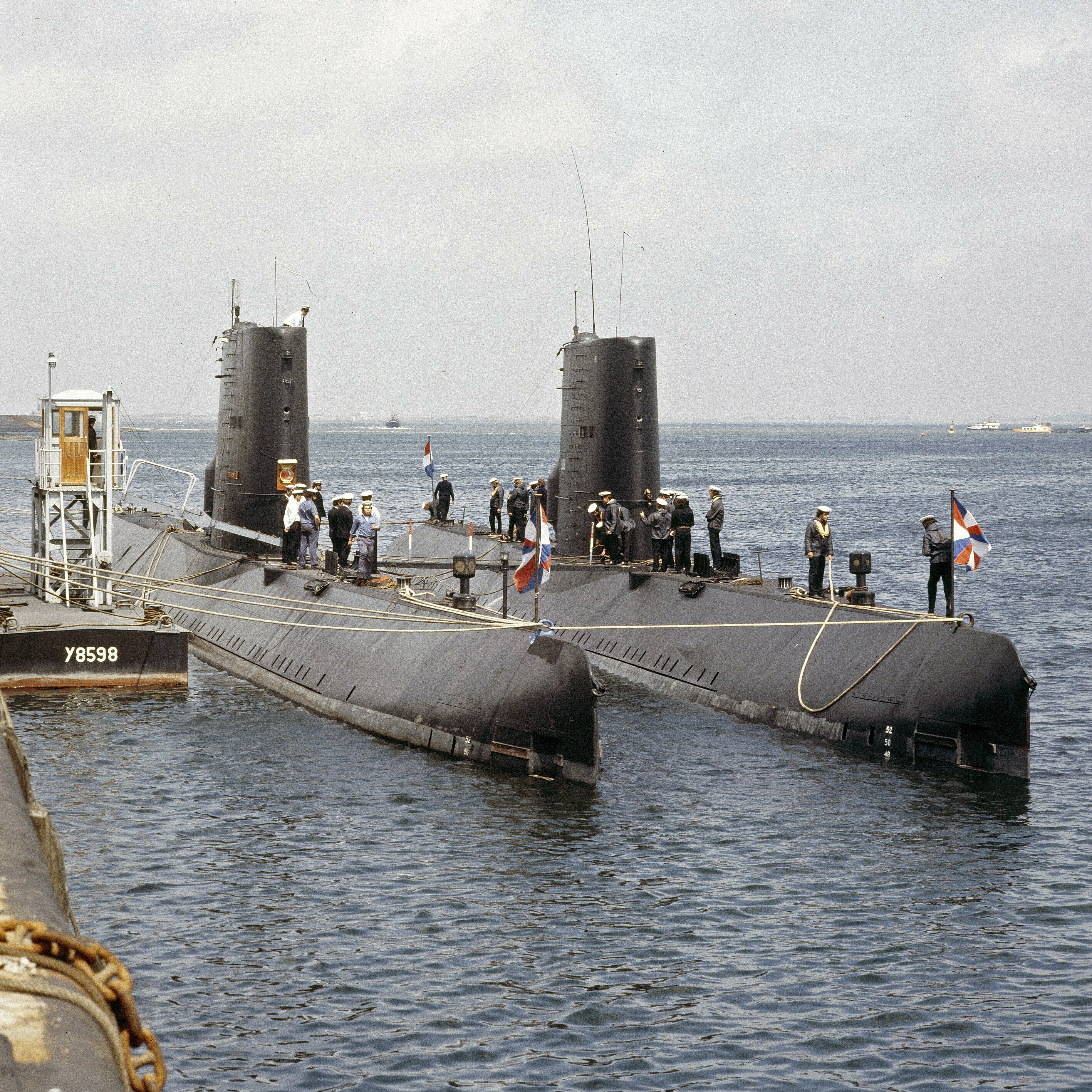
Sister ships Zeehond and Dolfijn docked at port

After the design was finalised at the end of the 1940s it was decided not to immediately build the four submarines. The reason for this was that the Dutch government could not afford to pay for the construction at the time. The Politionele acties in Indonesia had cost the government a lot of money and at the same time the price of maintaining the old and outdated submarine fleet was high. The submarine was re-designed to lower the price and was put to tender in August 1950. Eventually the Rotterdamsche Droogdok Maatschappij managed to get the order to build four submarines for 12 million guilders each with an option for another four submarines. The construction of the boats started in 1954, however, it took till 1960 for the first submarine, HNLMS Dolfijn, to be commissioned. During the construction of the Dolfijn class the Dutch government had approached the United States to ask if they could lend two more submarines since the construction of the new submarines took longer than expected and the replacement of several old Dutch submarines could wait no longer. The old submarines the Royal Netherlands Navy were operating were expected to be decommissioned in 1954 and their performance was already severely lacking at the end of the 1940s. The United States gave their consent and lent USS Icefish and Hawkbill of the Balao class, which were renamed and commissioned as HNLMS Walrus and Zeeleeuw during their stay with the Royal Netherlands Navy. These two submarines were of the so-called GUPPY design (Greater Underwater Propulsion Power) and a big update in comparison to the old submarines of the Dutch navy. Around the same time the Dutch government also decided to put the construction of the last two submarines of Dolfijn-class submarines on hold, since it wanted to research and focus on submarines based on nuclear propulsion. They decided this after seeing the performance of the nuclear submarines of the United States and the plans of the Soviet Union, Great Britain and France to construct nuclear submarines. This meant that in 1961 there were only two of the planned four Dolfijn-class submarines in active service, HNLMS Dolfijn and in December 1961 the commissioned HNLMS Zeehond. After the Dutch government deemed nuclear propulsion not feasible for the two Dolfijn-class submarines that were put on hold, it was decided to build them with diesel-electric propulsion and they were commissioned respectively in November 1965 and February 1966 as HNLMS Potvis and HNLMS Tonijn. Since these two submarines were built later than the previous two some have started calling them Potvis-class submarines rather than Dolfijn-class submarines.

== Design ==
Dolfijn-class submarine section plans

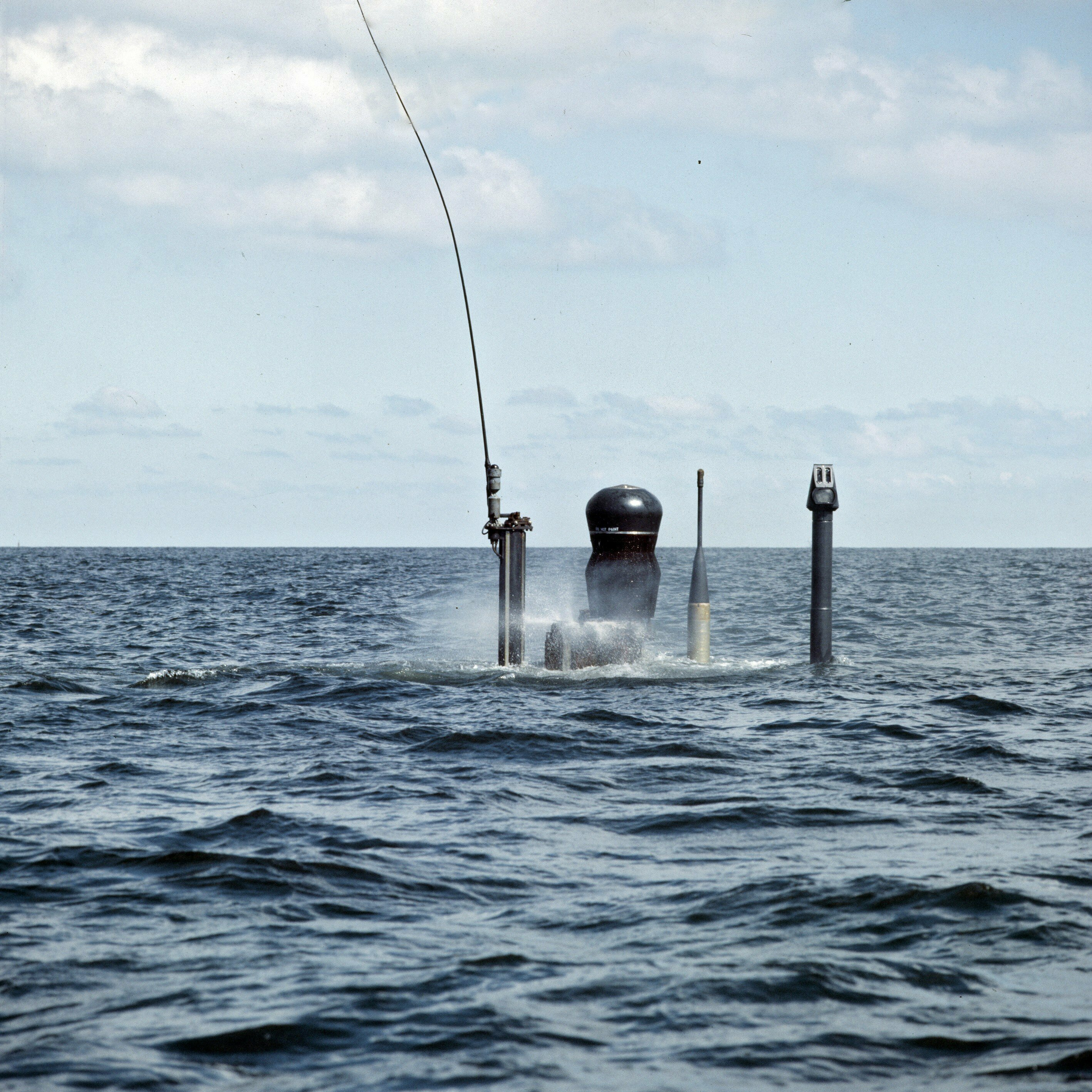
Zeehond at periscope depth

The four diesel-electric submarines of the Dolfijn class and the Potvis class form the so-called Three-Cylinders; These four boats are virtually identical and the four boats are considered one and the same class consisting of two batches. The name is based on their unusual design, instead of one or two pressure hulls the submarines of the Dolfijn class consists of three separate pressure hulls (cylinders) arranged in a triangle and enclosed in an external steel casing which separates the inside of the submarine into three parts. The main advantages are that it allows submarines to dive deeper and have better stability than other boats, among other things. The disadvantage, however, is that it means that the submarine has more machinery and thus more crew to maintain and control those machinery. The upper hull was meant for the living and working part of the crew and the lower two hulls were for the engines, batteries and storage rooms. This allowed the submarine to dive much deeper than other submarines from the late 1950s, with a test depth of 200 metres (660 ft). The designer was Max F. Gunning, who came upon this idea when he thought of a way to make sure Malta was properly provisioned during the Second World War.

The Royal Netherlands Navy considered using nuclear propulsion for the second batch of Dolfijn-class submarines (so-called Potvis class) and therefore postponed in the late 1950s their construction to study the feasibility of building nuclear powered submarines, but in the end it was decided not to use nuclear propulsion for the Potvis-class submarines. This meant that both Potvis-class submarines were built with diesel-electric propulsion like her earlier sister ships.

Zeehond was converted into a trials ship by Rotterdamsche Droogdok Maatschappij shipyard in Rotterdam in 1990 and used as a technology demonstrator for a closed cycle diesel air-independent propulsion system until 1994.

== Tasks ==
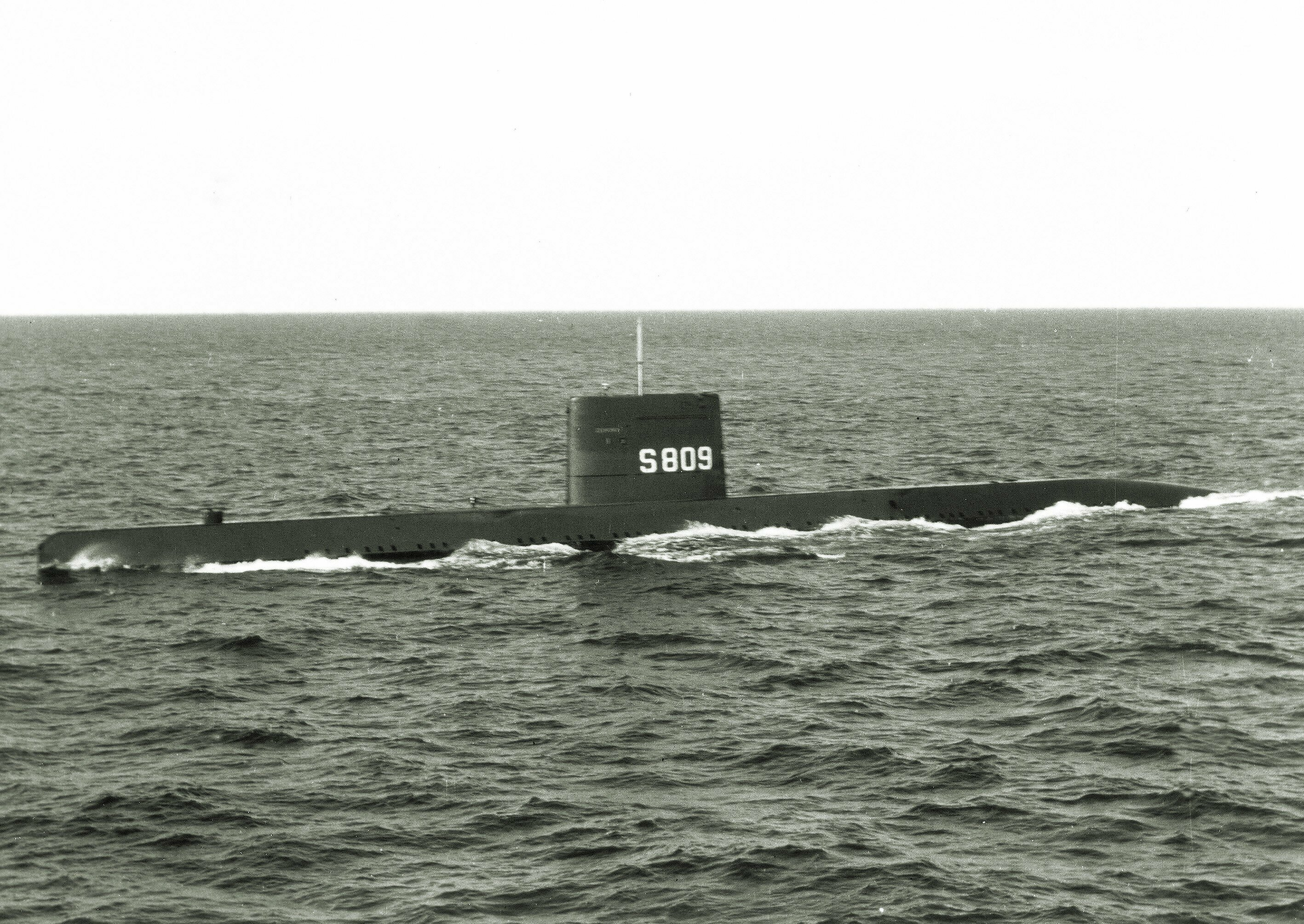
Zeehond in the North Sea, 1962

The Dolfijn-class submarines had several tasks in case of wartime, these were:

- Attacking enemy surface vessels, submarines and merchant ships
- Laying mines
- Gather intelligence
- Pick up and drop off agents in enemy territory
- Save pilots of aircraft's during air attacks on enemy territory
- Being an advanced radar station for the Dutch fleet
- Defending Dutch ships against submarines

== Ships in class ==
Ship	Builder	Laid down	Launched	Commissioned	Fate
Dolfijn	Rotterdamsche Droogdok Maatschappij	30 December 1954	20 May 1959	16 December 1960	Broken up 1985
Zeehond	Rotterdamsche Droogdok Maatschappij	30 December 1954	20 February 1960	16 March 1961	Test ship 1990, Scrapped 1997
Potvis class
Potvis	Wilton-Fijenoord	17 September 1962	12 January 1965	2 November 1965	Decommissioned 1992, Broken up 1994
Tonijn	Wilton-Fijenoord	26 October 1962	14 June 1965 1965	24 February 1966	Decommissioned 1991, preserved in the Dutch Navy Museum in Den Helder.

== See also ==
Equivalent submarines of the same era

- Barbel class
- Romeo class
- Narval class
- Oberon class
- Foxtrot class
