= Dutch Navy Museum =

- Marinemuseum
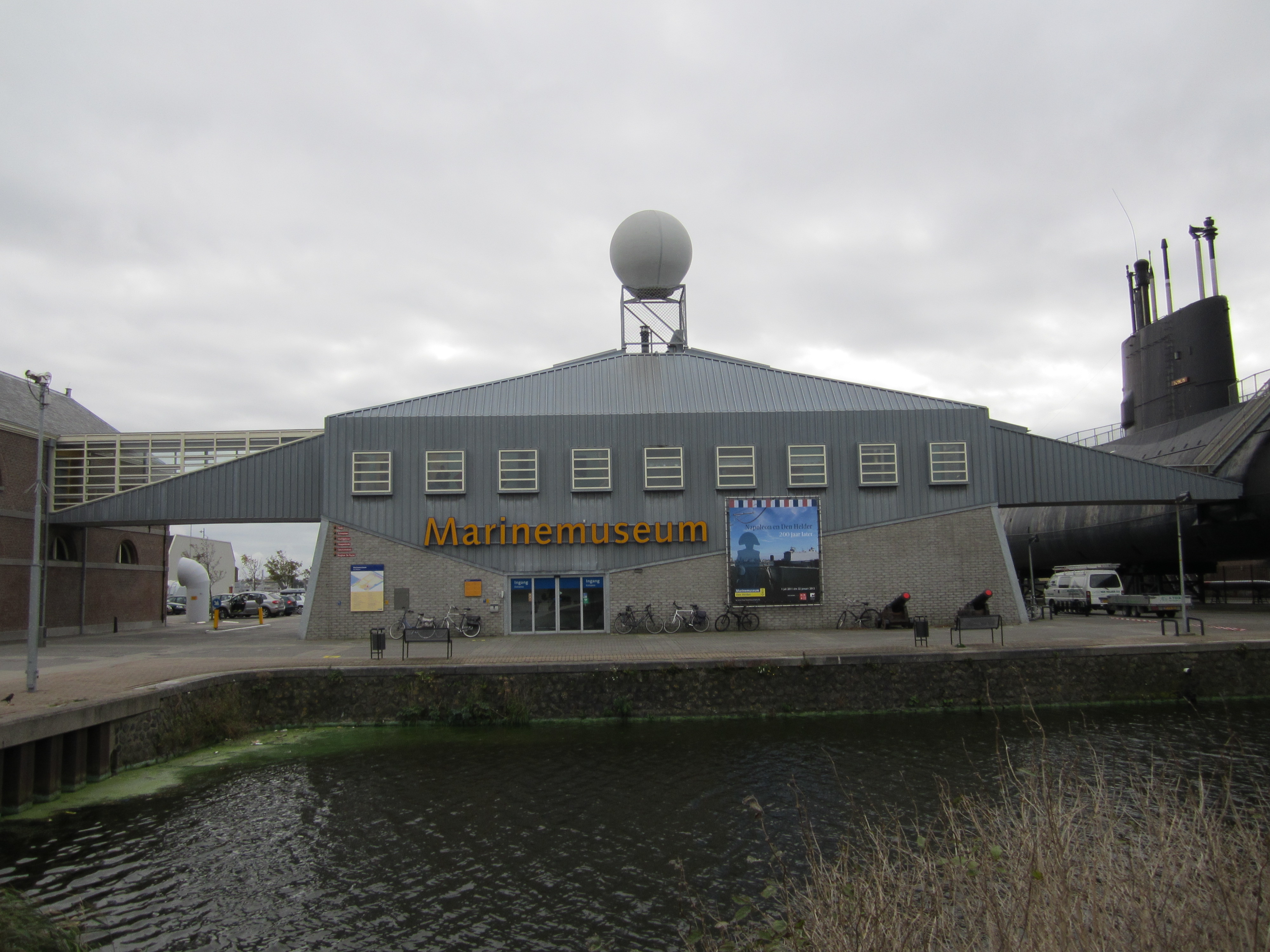
- The museum entrance

- Location in North Holland in the Netherlands
- Location: Hoofdgracht 3 Den Helder, Netherlands
- Coordinates: 52.9638°N 4.7717°E
- Type: Naval museum
- Website: marinemuseum.nl

The Dutch Navy Museum is a naval museum in Den Helder, Netherlands.

The museum is dedicated to the history of the Koninklijke Marine (Royal Netherlands Navy).

The most important ships the museum owns are:

- HNLMS Abraham Crijnssen (minesweeper)
- HNLMS Schorpioen (ironclad ram)
- HNLMS Tonijn (submarine)
- HNLMS De Ruyter (guided missile destroyer) (Deck and radar)
