= HNLMS Bruinvis =

Submarine of the Royal Netherlands Navy

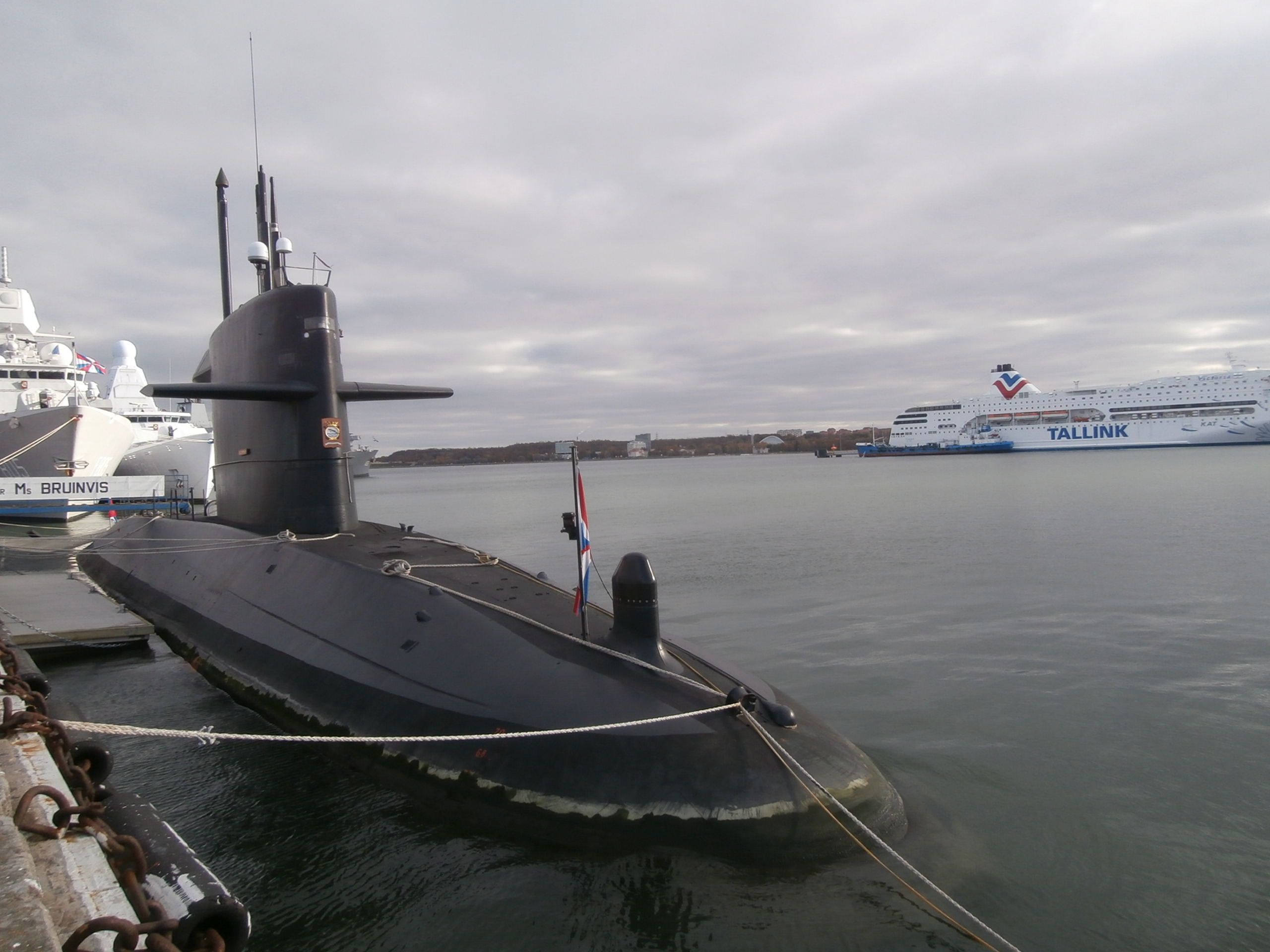
- HNLMS Bruinvis (S810) in at Quay 15 in Tallinn 18 October 2014

History

Netherlands
- Name: Bruinvis
- Namesake: Harbour porpoise
- Builder: Rotterdamsche Droogdok Maatschappij, Rotterdam
- Yard number: RDM-353
- Laid down: 14 April 1988
- Launched: 25 April 1992
- Commissioned: 5 July 1994
- Identification: S810
- Motto: Klein maar dapper; Dutch: Small but brave
- Status: In active service as of 2026
- Badge

General characteristics
- Class & type: Walrus-class submarine
- Displacement: 2,450 t (2,411 long tons; 2,701 short tons) surfaced; 2,800 t (2,756 long tons; 3,086 short tons) submerged
- Length: 67.179 m (220.40 ft)
- Beam: 8.4 m (28 ft)
- Draught: 7.5 m (25 ft)
- Propulsion: Diesel-electric (3,132 kW)
- Speed: 11 knots (20 km/h; 13 mph) surfaced; 20 knots (37 km/h; 23 mph) submerged
- Test depth: 300 m (980 ft)
- Complement: 55
- Armament: Mark 48 torpedoes Harpoon missiles

HNLMS Bruinvis (S810) is a Walrus-class submarine of the Royal Netherlands Navy. She entered service in 1994 as the fourth and final submarine of the Walrus class, after HNLMS Walrus, Zeeleeuw and Dolfijn. Bruinvis has been deployed both for naval exercises and in combat operations around the world. As of 2026 the submarine was in active service.

== Ship history ==
Bruinvis was laid down on 14 April 1988 at the Rotterdamsche Droogdok Maatschappij ("Rotterdam Dry Dock Company") yard in Rotterdam. The christening and launching took place four years later on 25 April 1992 by the wife of the Secretary of State for Defense at the time, Mrs. J.M. baroness van Voorst tot Voorst - Bloys van Treslong. Bruinvis—like sister ship Dolfijn—was built in the Scheepsbouwloods, transported to the ship lift and launched via the boat lift. On 5 July 1994 the ship was transferred to the Royal Netherlands Navy and put into service.

A fire on board sister ship Walrus during her construction delayed the construction of the other three submarines of the Walrus class, which meant that Bruinvis went later into service than expected.

Bruinvis took part in Operation Ocean Shield alongside HNLMS Rotterdam in 2011 and 2012.

In May 2014 Bruinvis took part in the NATO exercise Dynamic Monarch.

In 2016 Bruinvis docked in Gibraltar as part of a mission, it also marked the first docking of a Dutch submarine to Gibraltar in over a decade.

In 2018 Bruinvis was in maintenance all year.

In March 2026 Bruinvis was spotted in Marsdiep while returning to the Nieuwe Haven Naval Base.

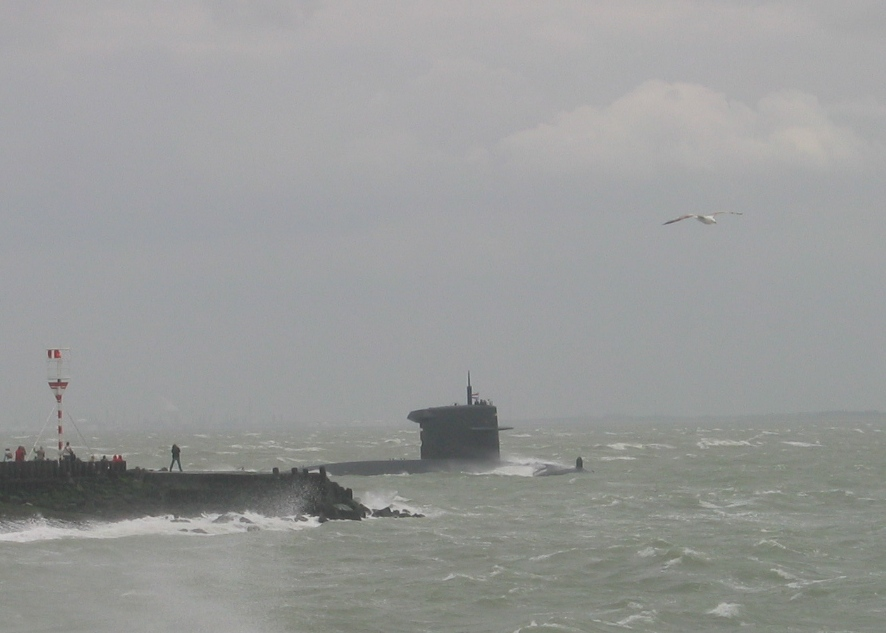
HNLMS Bruinvis

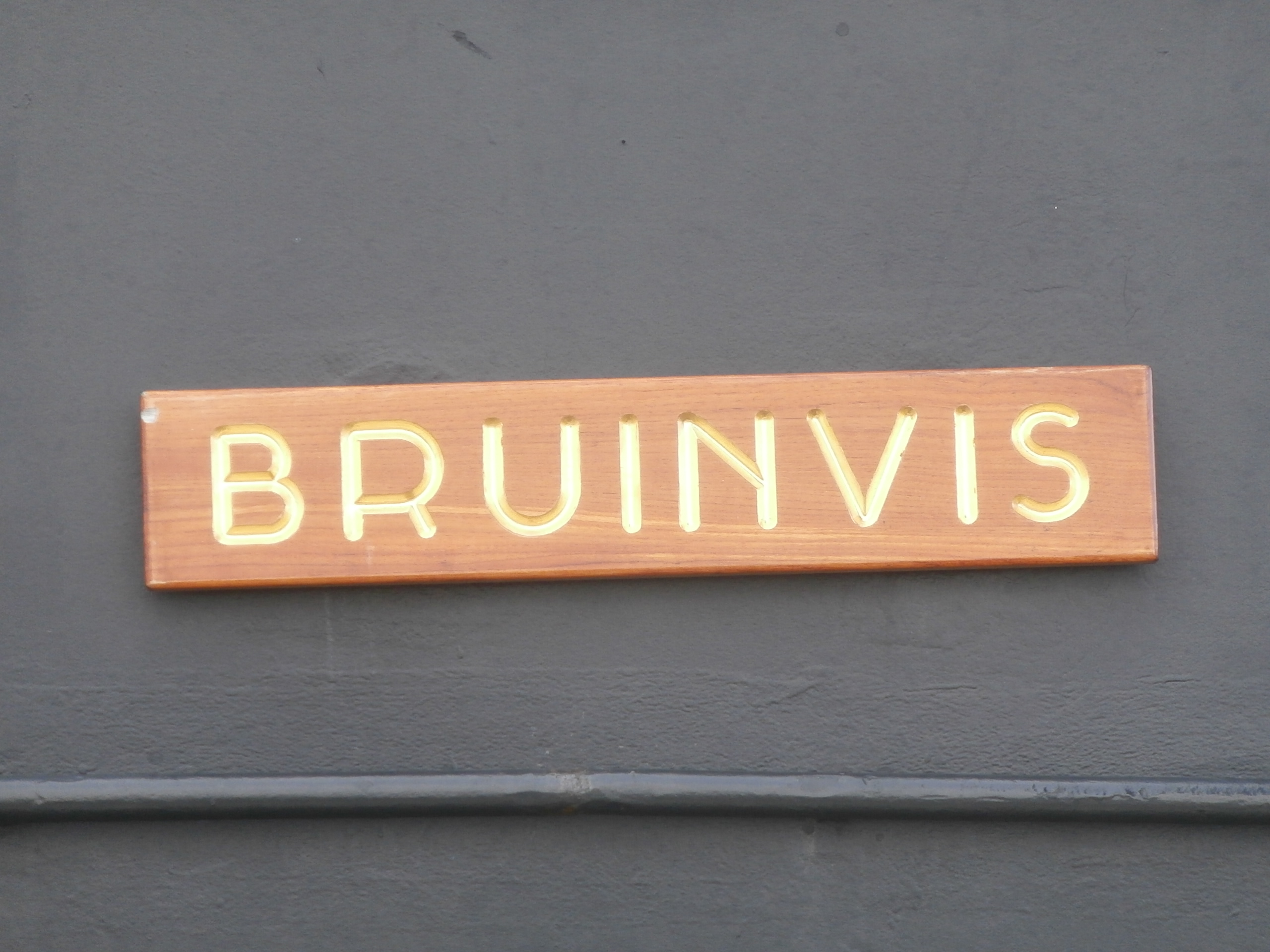
HNLMS Bruinvis name plate
