= HNLMS Dolfijn (1990) =

Submarine

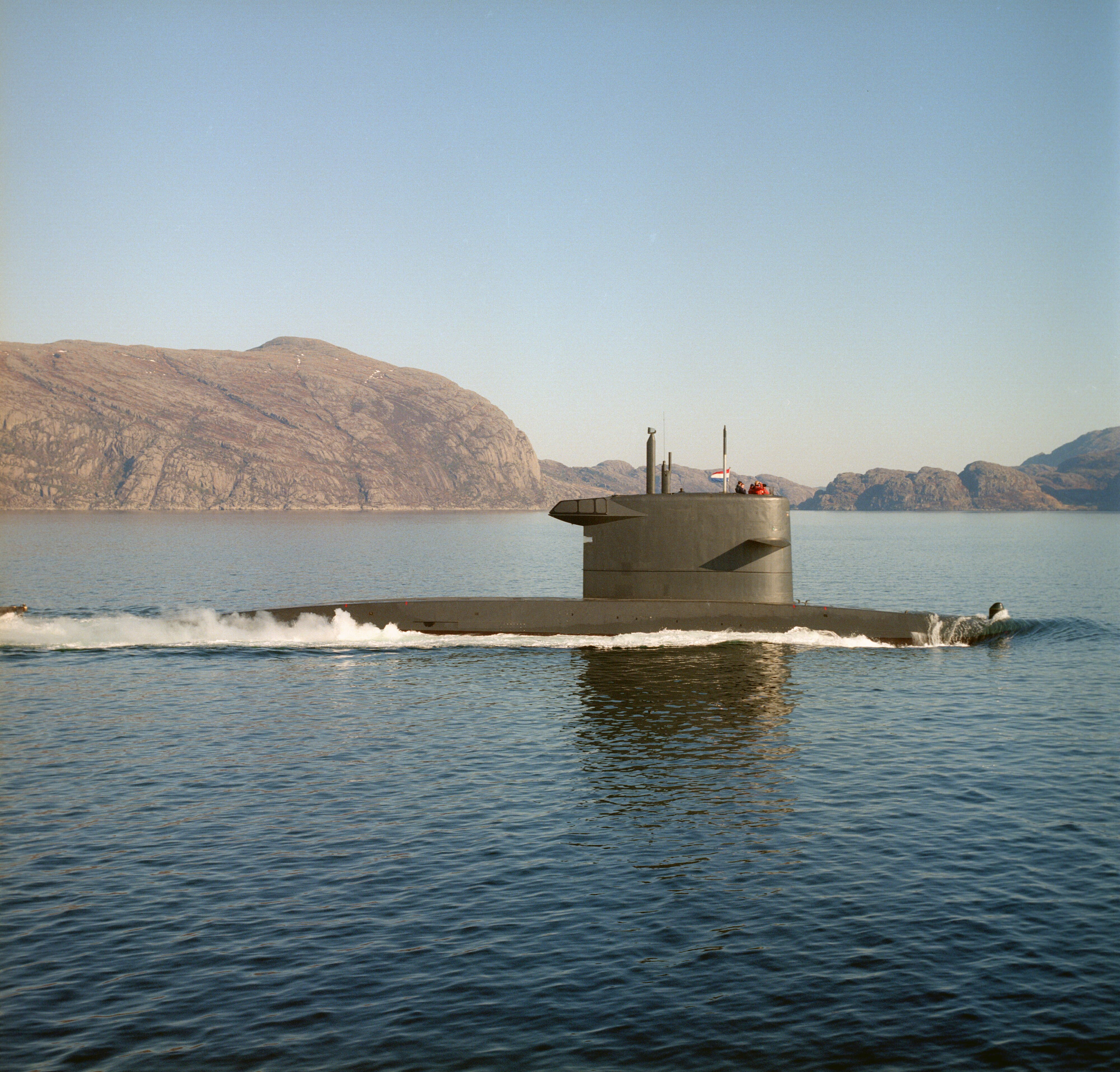
- Dolfijn in 1996

History

Netherlands
- Name: Dolfijn
- Namesake: Dolphin
- Operator: Royal Netherlands Navy
- Builder: Rotterdamsche Droogdok Maatschappij
- Yard number: 352
- Laid down: 12 June 1986
- Launched: 25 April 1990
- Commissioned: 29 June 1993
- Identification: S808
- Motto: Ik zal voor gaan; Dutch: I shall go first
- Status: In active service as of November 2023
- Badge

General characteristics
- Class & type: Walrus-class submarine
- Displacement: 2,350 t surfaced, 2,650 t submerged, 1,900 t standard
- Length: 68 m (223 ft 1 in)
- Beam: 8.5 m (27 ft 11 in)
- Draught: 7.5 m (24 ft 7 in)
- Propulsion: Diesel-electric (3,132 kW)
- Speed: 11 knots (20 km/h; 13 mph) surfaced; 20 knots (37 km/h; 23 mph) submerged
- Test depth: 300 m (980 ft)
- Complement: 60
- Armament: Mark 48 torpedoes and Harpoon missiles

HNLMS Dolfijn (S808) is a Walrus-class submarine of the Royal Netherlands Navy. She entered service in 1993 as the third submarine of the Walrus class, after HNLMS Walrus and HNLMS Zeeleeuw. Dolfijn has been deployed both for naval exercises and in combat operations around the world. Furthermore, the submarine plays an important role by performing intelligence operations.

== Maintenance and upgrade ==
In 2016, Dolfijn was taken out of service after being active for years by the Royal Netherlands Navy to perform maintenance and modernize its systems. For example, the ageing GIPSY combat system will be replaced with the more modern Guardion combat system. Besides changing the software suit, hardware components were also either replaced or upgraded with newer versions. The Medium Range Sonar (MRS) and Long Range Sonar (LRS) will get replaced by new ones. In addition a new sonar was added, which is called the Mine and Obstacle Avoidance Sonar (MOAS). The Consoles and screens in the command room also will get an upgrade to more modern versions, while the navigation and attack periscopes will go from being depended on analog sensors to digital sensors. This will be done by replacing several masts. The holes have already been drilled for this upgrade. Lastly, the Mark 48 torpedoes were upgraded from Mod 4 to the more recent Mod 7.

== Service history ==
HNLMS Dolfijn on 15 June 2013, in the Baltic Sea during Baltic Operations (BALTOPS).

During NATO operation Allied Force, Dolfijn upheld a trade embargo off the coast of former Yugoslavia. She also eavesdropped enemy communication and forwarded the obtained information to the military forces of the NATO. At the same time she also forwarded enemy ship movements to the Western European Union. In addition, the Commander Submarines Mediterranean had ordered Dolfijn to disable any naval ship of the Federal Republic of Yugoslavia that went out to sea.

In 2012, Dolfijn took part in anti-piracy operation Ocean Shield that took place off the coast of Somalia.

At the beginning of 2014, the Netherlands Maritime Special Operations Forces (NLMARSOF) trained with the Dolfijn in the Caribbean Sea. This is important because in the area there is a lot of illegal drug trade and the Netherlands tries to stop this with other countries.

=== COVID-19 pandemic ===
On 30 March 2020, the Ministry of Defence reported that eight crew members of Dolfijn had tested positive. Out of 58 crew members, 15 sailors with mild symptoms were tested. The submarine changed course near Scotland to return to the Netherlands two weeks early, arriving in Den Helder on 3 April.

Dolfijn made a routine port visit to the United States at Naval Station Mayport, Florida in May 2022.

During 2022 a vagrant walrus named Freya attracted media attention when it rested on the ship.

In September 2024 it was reported that Dolfijn had completed a month-long surveillance mission in the northern waters, which included the Norwegian Sea and the northern part of the North Sea. During this mission Dolfijn kept an eye on naval ships and submarines that do not belong to NATO countries.

== Gallery ==
HNLMS Evertsen (F805), right, and the attack submarine HNLMS Dolfijn (S808) conduct maritime operations in the Baltic Sea during BALTOPS 2013

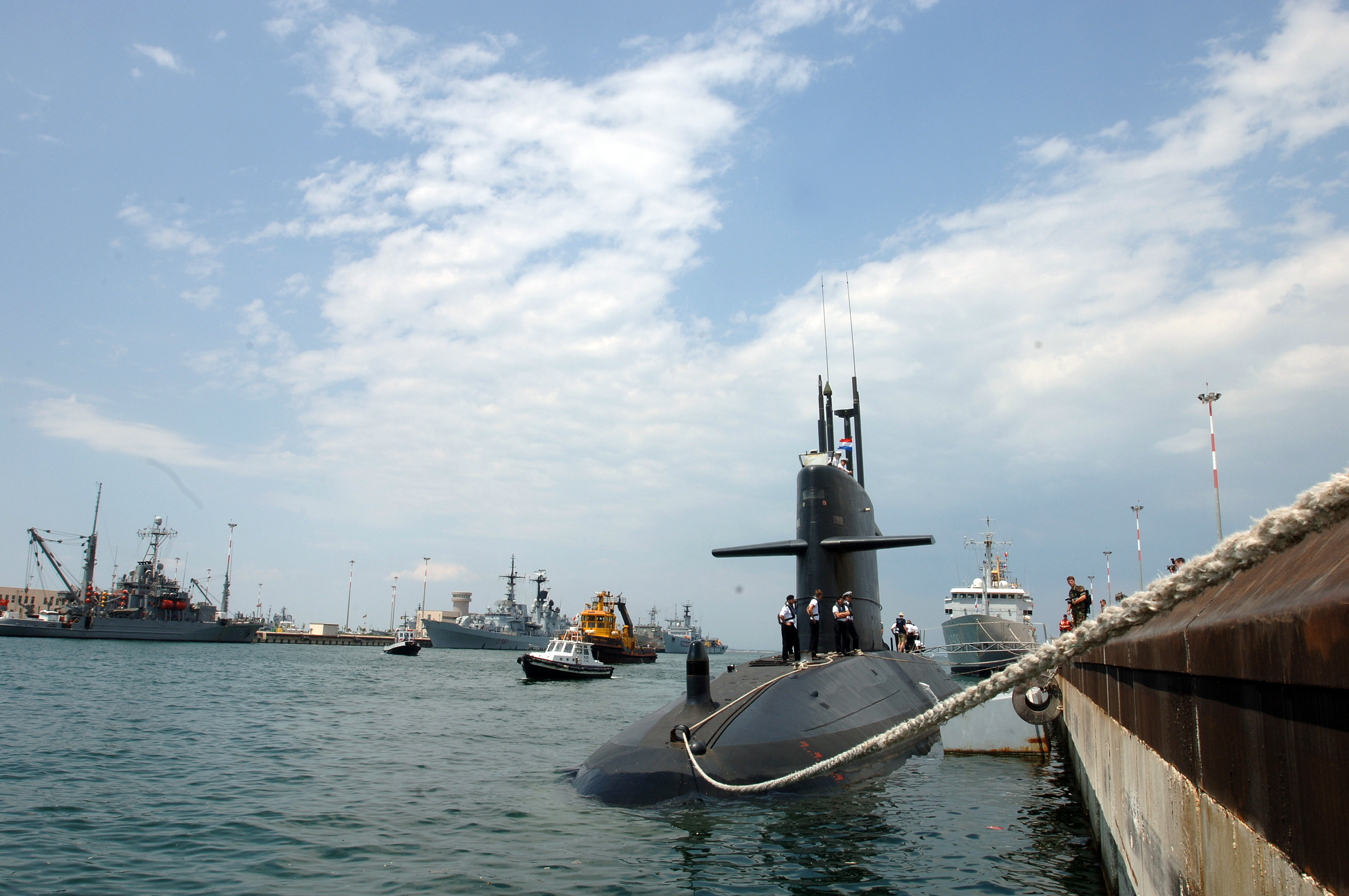
HNLMS Dolfijn (S808) prepares to get underway from Taranto Naval Base Mar Grande

== See also ==
- Ships of the Royal Netherlands Navy
