= Dutch Underwater Knowledge Centre =

- Abbreviation: DUKC
- Formation: 2004; 22 years ago
- Purpose: Preserving submarine knowledge within the Dutch industry

The Dutch Underwater Knowledge Centre (Note: Sometimes also written as Dutch Underwater Knowledge Center.) (DUKC) is a working group and knowledge platform aimed at preserving submarine knowledge within the Dutch industry. It consists of several Dutch companies and knowledge institutes that have experience and knowledge in the field of underwater technology. During the life extension program of the Walrus-class submarines DUKC played an important role.

== History ==
In 2003 the Dutch Ministry of Defence published a white paper in which it made known that the Dutch government wanted to retain the existing Dutch submarine capacity. As a result of this it was decided to extend the lifespan of the submarines of the Walrus class from 25 to 35–40 years. After the demise of RDM, the last remaining Dutch submarine builder, in 2004 DUKC was established in the same year to maintain, develop and position the existing Dutch underwater industry and related research institutes. Besides maintaining, developing and positioning the Dutch underwater industry, DUKC was also established with the intention to play an important role in the life extension of the Walrus-class submarines.

In 2007 the Dutch government approved the Life Extension Program (LEP) of the four submarines of the Walrus class, which would allow the submarines to serve in the Royal Netherlands Navy till at least 2025. Since DUKC contained as a knowledge platform and working group a lot of submarine knowledge the Materiel and IT Command (COMMIT) decided to involve DUKC in the LEP of the Walrus-class submarines. During the LEP several Dutch companies and knowledge institutes that were part of DUKC provided their expertise in submarine design and modification. In 2013 DUKC also released a report in cooperation with TNO in which it announced what kind of knowledge and skills in submarine design and construction still exists in the Netherlands.

Besides national submarine projects, the companies and research institutes that are part of DUKC are also involved in foreign submarine projects.

In 2022 Royal IHC joined DUKC.
