= Walrus-class submarine =

Attack submarine class of the Royal Netherlands Navy

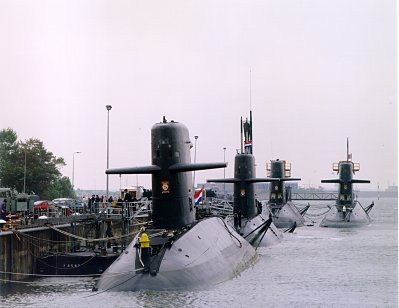

Class overview
- Name: Walrus class
- Builders: Rotterdamsche Droogdok Maatschappij
- Operators: Royal Netherlands Navy
- Preceded by: Dolfijn class; Zwaardvis class
- Succeeded by: Orka class
- Cost: ƒ500 million per unit (1992)
- Built: 1979–1992
- In commission: 1990–present
- Planned: 6
- Completed: 4
- Canceled: 2
- Active: 3
- Retired: 1

General characteristics
- Type: Diesel-electric attack submarine
- Displacement: 2,450 t surfaced, 2,800 t submerged, 1,900 t standard
- Length: 67.725 m (222 ft 2.3 in)
- Beam: 8.40 m (27 ft 7 in)
- Draft: 6.60 m (21 ft 8 in)
- Propulsion: 1 shaft (5 blades); 3 x SEMT Pielstick PA4 200 VG diesel engines 6,300 hp (4,700 kW); 1 x HOLEC electric motor; 420-cell VARTA batteries
- Speed: 13 knots (24 km/h; 15 mph) surfaced, 21 knots (39 km/h; 24 mph) submerged
- Range: 18,500 km (10,000 nmi) at 9 kn (17 km/h; 10 mph)
- Test depth: >300 m (980 ft)
- Complement: 49 to 52
- Sensors & processing systems: Radars: Signaal/Decca 1229; Signaal ZW-07; Argo Phoenix I; Sonar Systems: Thomson Sintra TSM 2272 Eledone Octopus; GEC Avionics Type 2026 towed array; Thomson Sintra DUUX 5 passive ranging and intercept; Fire-control system: HSA GIPSY (SEWACO VIII)
- Armament: 4 × 21-inch (533 mm) torpedo tubes; 20 × Honeywell Mk 48 torpedoes or Honeywell NT 37 C/D/E torpedoes; UGM-84 Harpoon SSM; 40 mines

The Walrus-class submarine is the only submarine class currently in operation in the Royal Netherlands Navy. The boats have been in service since 1990 and are all named after sea mammals.

== Background ==
In 1974, the Royal Netherlands Navy announced, through the Ministry of Defence's 10-year plan Defensienota 1974, that it wanted to replace its aging Dolfijn-class submarines. Since the 1960s, the Royal Netherlands Navy had been conducting studies and research into a suitable replacement attack submarine. This research initiative concluded that the Netherlands should build conventional diesel-electric submarines, as nuclear submarines were costly and could only be constructed, crewed, and maintained by countries with major navies such as the United States, France and the United Kingdom. Nonetheless, even with the diesel-electric submarine, the Dutch government sought to work together with international allies to reduce construction costs.

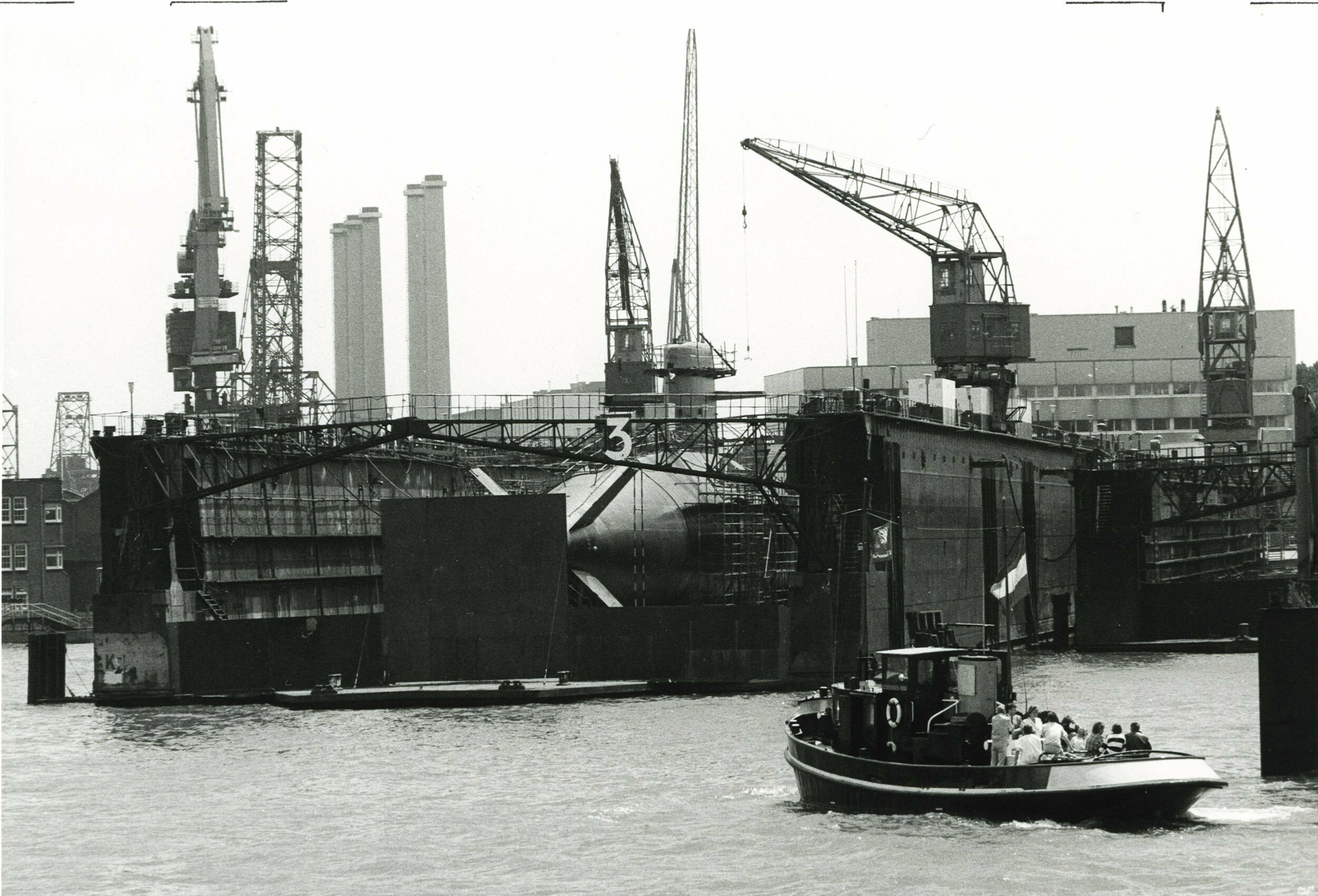
The Walrus-class Zeeleeuw under construction at Rotterdam in 1987

Between 1975 and 1978, the design of the Walrus class was for the most part completed, and included many improvements which would result in new, state-of-the-art submarines that would mark a significant improvement over previous submarines used by the Royal Netherlands Navy. For example, a special kind of French-produced steel was used to construct the hull of the Walrus-class submarines; this steel proved to be more elastic, allowing submarines of the class to dive deeper than previous submarines. Furthermore, there was a focus on automation which was aimed at decreasing the manpower required to operate the submarines, while also making them more effective against threats.

On 19 June 1979, Minister of Defense Willem Scholten signed a contract worth 425 million guilders with the Rotterdamsche Droogdok Maatschappij (RDM) to build two submarines to replace the Dolfijn-class submarines, with the construction of the second boat to commence the following year. Soon, RDM noticed that the new submarines could not be built the same way as the Zwaardvis-class submarines; it had to use new techniques to build the submarines. Furthermore, the design was constantly modified to incorporate new developments in the submarine world, which led to issues that slowed the building process. Nonetheless, construction continued and on 11 October 1979, HNLMS Walrus was laid down. Two years later, on 24 September 1981, HNLMS Zeeleeuw was laid down.

Unexpectedly, on 19 February 1983, RDM's parent company Rijn-Schelde-Verolme declared bankruptcy, despite successive governments providing 2.2 billion guilders in state aid to RSV. This was problematic because the construction of the Walrus-class submarines was far from completion. To ensure construction of the submarines continued, RDM was re-established as an independent company. Furthermore, the Royal Netherlands Navy ordered an additional two Walrus-class submarines earlier than planned to assist RDM financially. However, at this time the Walrus-class submarines were facing many problems. One of these problems was that the specifications of the Walrus class submarines were only finalized in 1984. Since construction had already started by that time, the first two boats had to be lengthened by 1 meter, at a cost of 10 million Dutch guilder per boat, to fit all equipment.

New problems arose on 14 August 1986, when the command centre of Walrus caught fire, while it was still on a scaffold in the shipyard. The fire lasted about five hours, and resulted in immense damage to the submarine; the command center was completely burned out. While some equipment could be rescued, most had to be replaced. This delayed the construction of the submarines once again because the equipment that was ordered for the next boats had to be transferred to finish the Walrus. The costs of the resulting damage from the fire was 225 million guilders, which was fully covered by insurance. The exact location, origin and cause of the fire was never established. Presumably, the fire was caused in the vicinity of the corporals and men's washroom by a defect in the electrical work lighting. Repairs were reported as complete in 1987, but had so delayed construction of Walrus that the second submarine (with construction number 349) was put into service as the first of the class, with the name HNLMS Zeeleeuw (sea lion). HNLMS Walrus was put into service two years later. The two other boats were put into service as HNLMS Dolfijn and HNLMS Bruinvis (porpoise). The delays meant that HNLMS Dolfijn (S808), HNLMS Potvis and HNLMS Tonijn of the Dolfijn class had to remain in service longer than planned. All the problems, delays and rising costs were eventually dubbed by the Dutch national parliament as the "Walrus-affair". Nonetheless, at the time of their commissioning, the Walrus-class submarines were considered to be one of the most modern and advanced conventional submarines in operation.

== Design ==
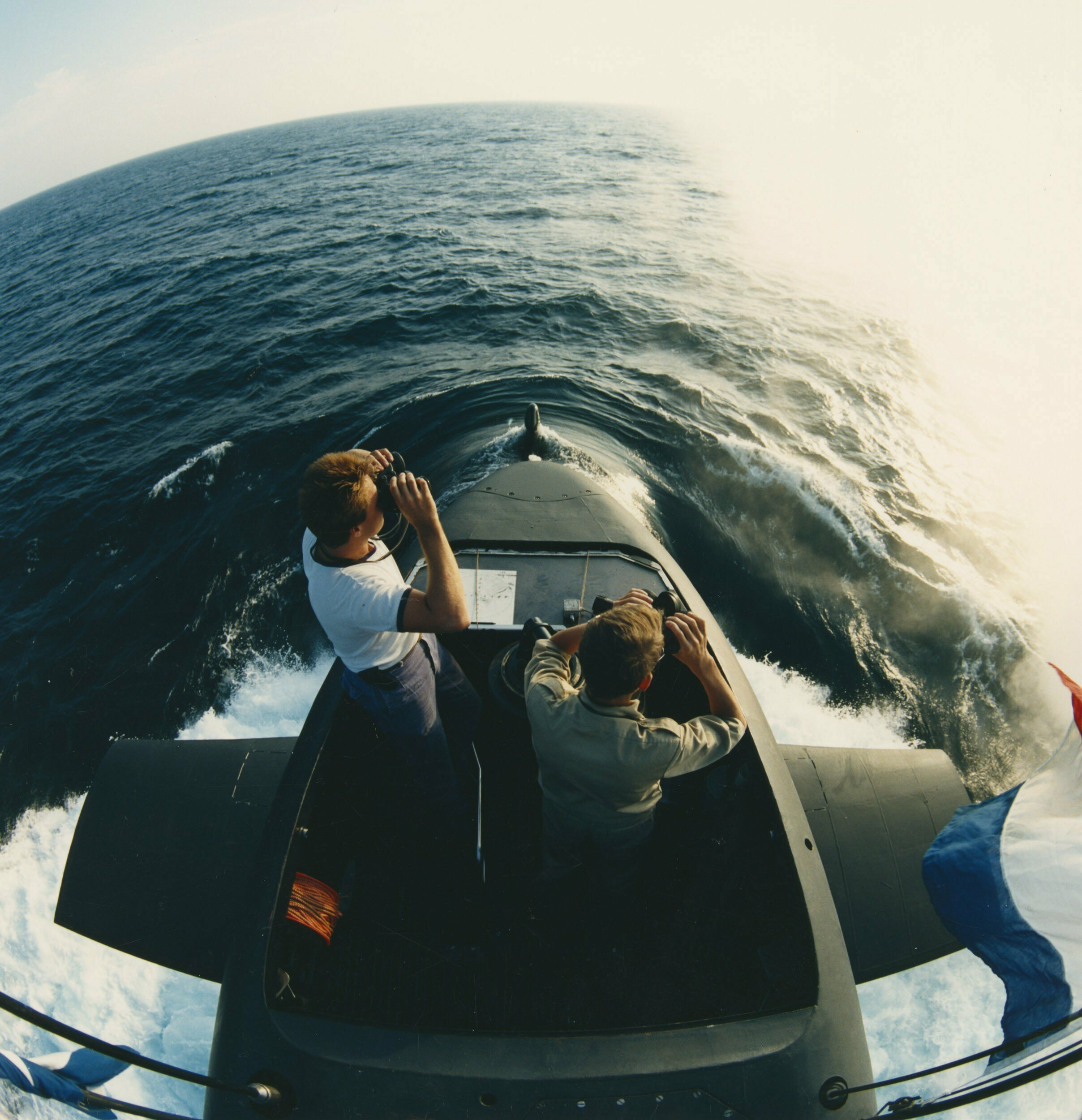
Inside the conning tower

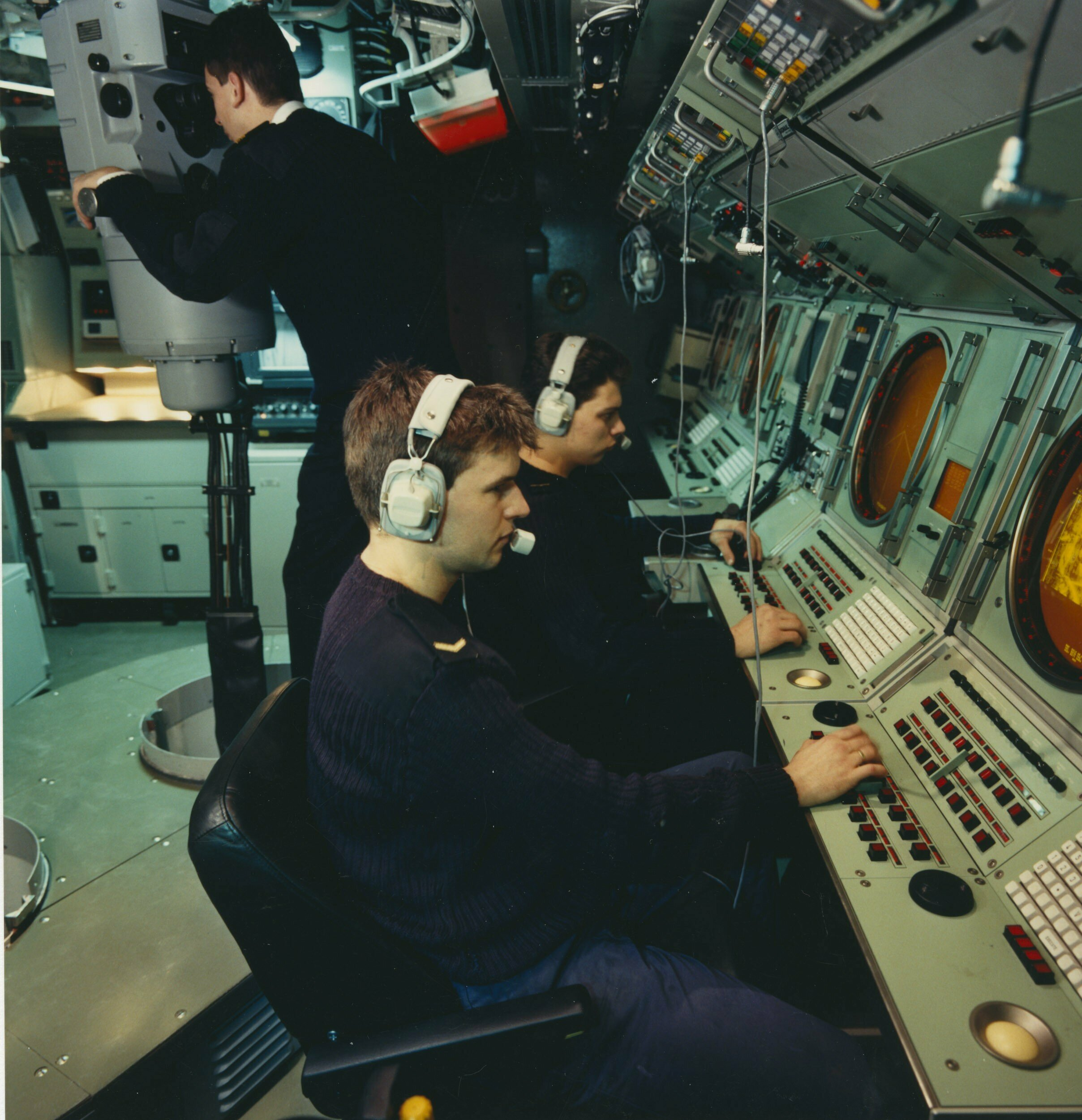
Operations compartment aboard Zeeleeuw, 1998

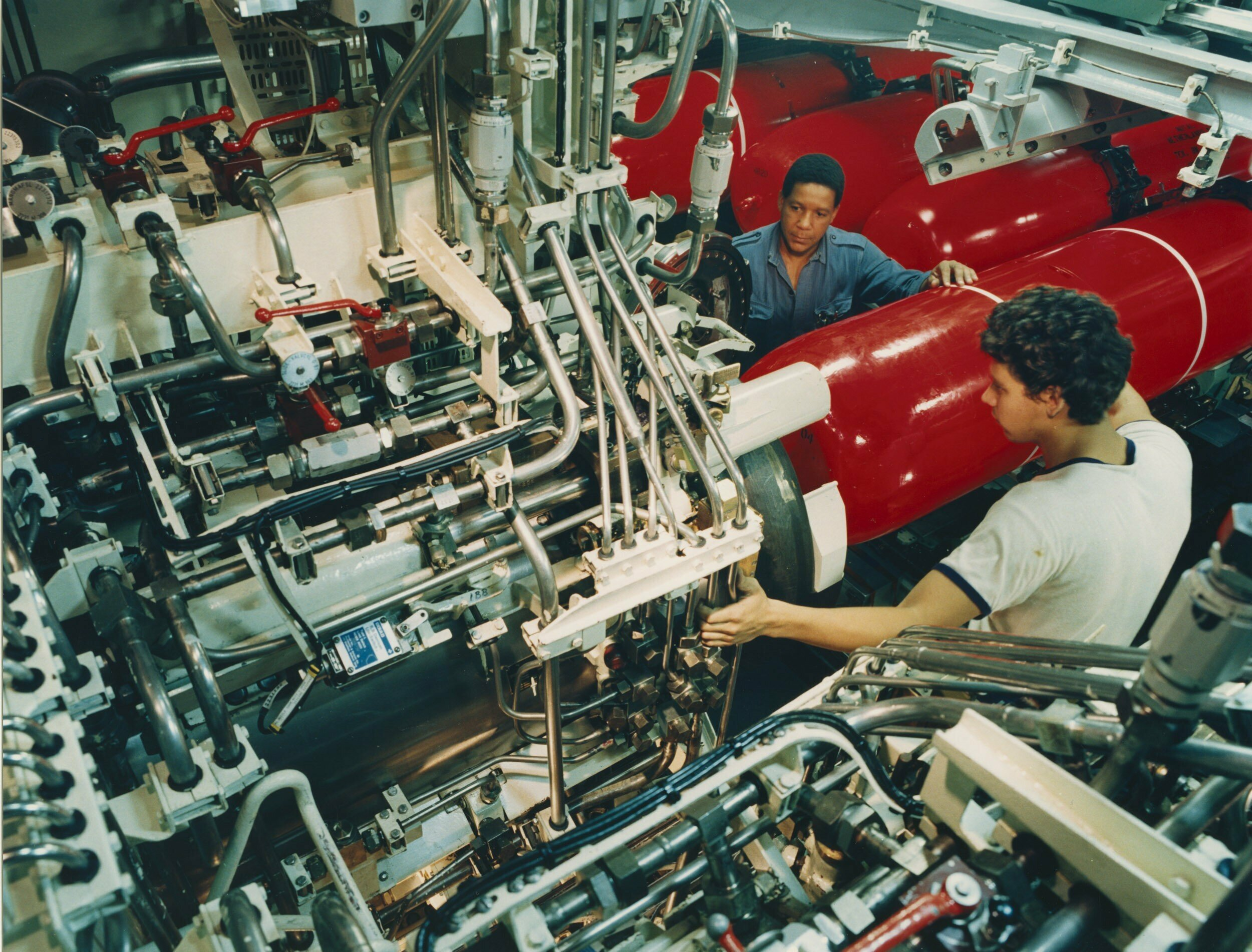
Torpedo room aboard Zeeleeuw

The Walrus-class submarine was designed by Jan Jaap van Rijn, at the time Chief Bureau of Submarines (Dutch: Hoofd Bureau Onderzeeboten) at the Directorate of Materiel of the Royal Netherlands Navy (Dutch: Directie Materieel van de Koninklijke Marine).

The Walrus-class submarines are unusual in that instead of a cross-shaped assembly of stern diving planes and rudders, they mount four combined rudders and diving planes in an "X" configuration. This tail configuration was first tested in 1960 on the United States Navy's USS Albacore, and has since been used by the Walrus class, all Swedish Navy submarines since the Sjöormen class, the Royal Australian Navy's Collins class, the German Navy Type 212A and the Japan Maritime Self-Defense Force's Sōryū class. The X configuration is a complex system and therefore not implemented by many other navies around the world.

The submarines of the Walrus class, when submerged, are silent and therefore difficult to detect by ships, planes and other submarines once they go into hiding. This makes the boats very suitable for combating surface vessels and submarines, protecting friendly units, gathering information, providing early warning detection, and supporting special operations. The submarines can also be used to enforce international sanctions, as they did during the Yugoslav Wars.

The Walrus-class submarines were specifically designed for hunting Russian submarines during the Cold War. However, the Cold War had ended by the time they became operational. Nonetheless, they have provided excellent services in various international conflict situations in which the deployment of the Royal Netherlands Navy was requested. Since the Dutch submarines have acquired a good reputation, they are often part of international exercises, taking part in mock battles.

In March 2023 it was reported that the Dutch government wants to buy Tomahawks for the Walrus class submarines. The Tomahawks would be the Torpedo Tube Launch (TTL) version, which can be fired from the torpedo tubes of the submarines. However, at the same time it was also stated that if the delivery of this version of the Tomahawk would take too long to deliver it might not be feasible to integrate them on the Walrus class, as these submarines will be replaced in the 2030s by a new class of submarines. In May 2025 it was disclosed that the Walrus class submarines will not be equipped with Tomahawks.

== Operational history ==
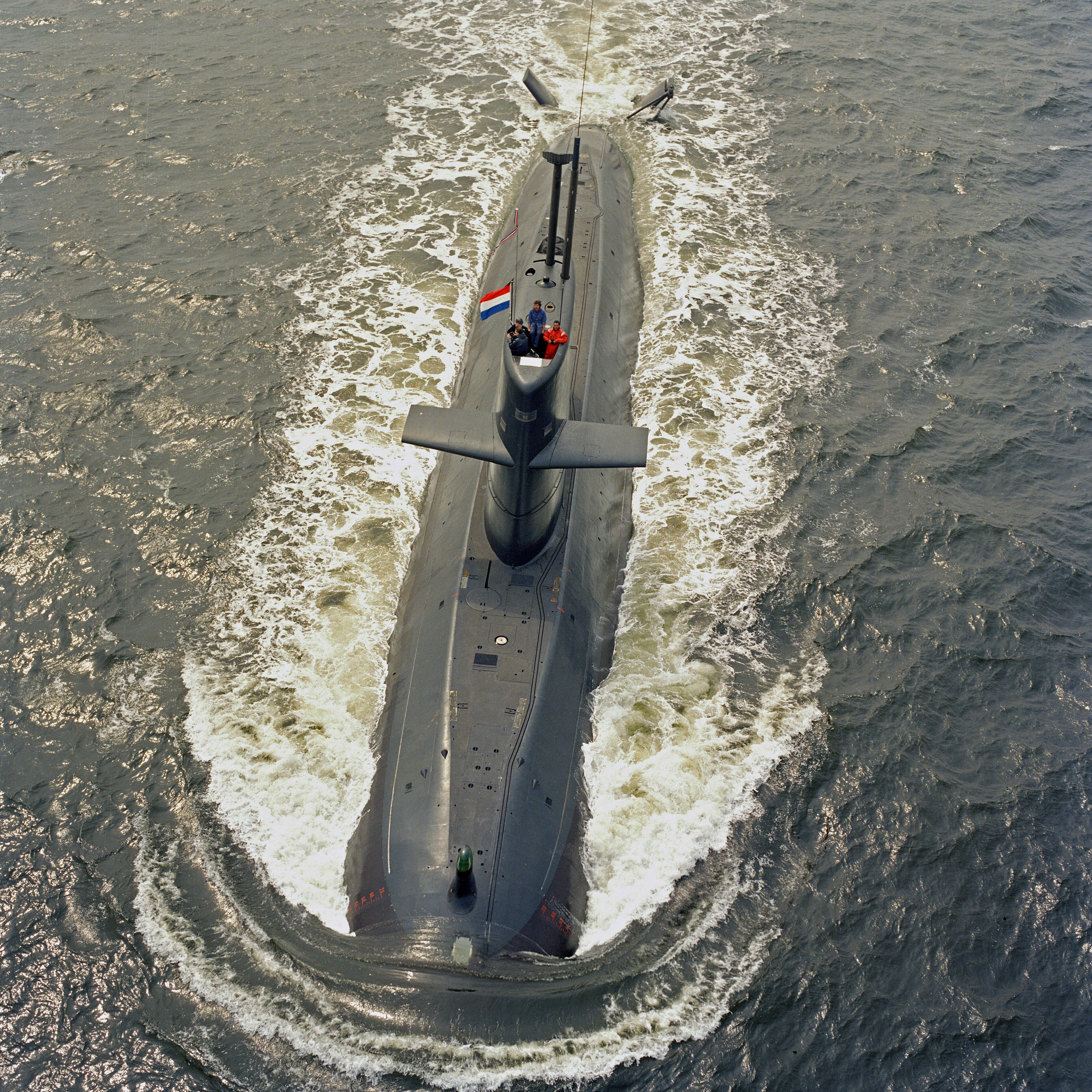
Aerial view of Zeeleeuw

After the Cold War, the submarines have been tasked with many highly confidential intelligence gathering operations, many of which are still classified. They have operated in the Northern Atlantic, Mediterranean Yugoslavian region, the Persian Gulf at Iran and Iraq, and the Caribbean, often upon the request of allies, including the United States.

In June 2010, the Netherlands agreed to deploy one submarine to help combat piracy off the coast of Somalia.

In November 2016, the Russian Navy claimed to have chased off a Walrus-class vessel from a battle group that included the Admiral Kuznetsov.

=== Submarine command course ===
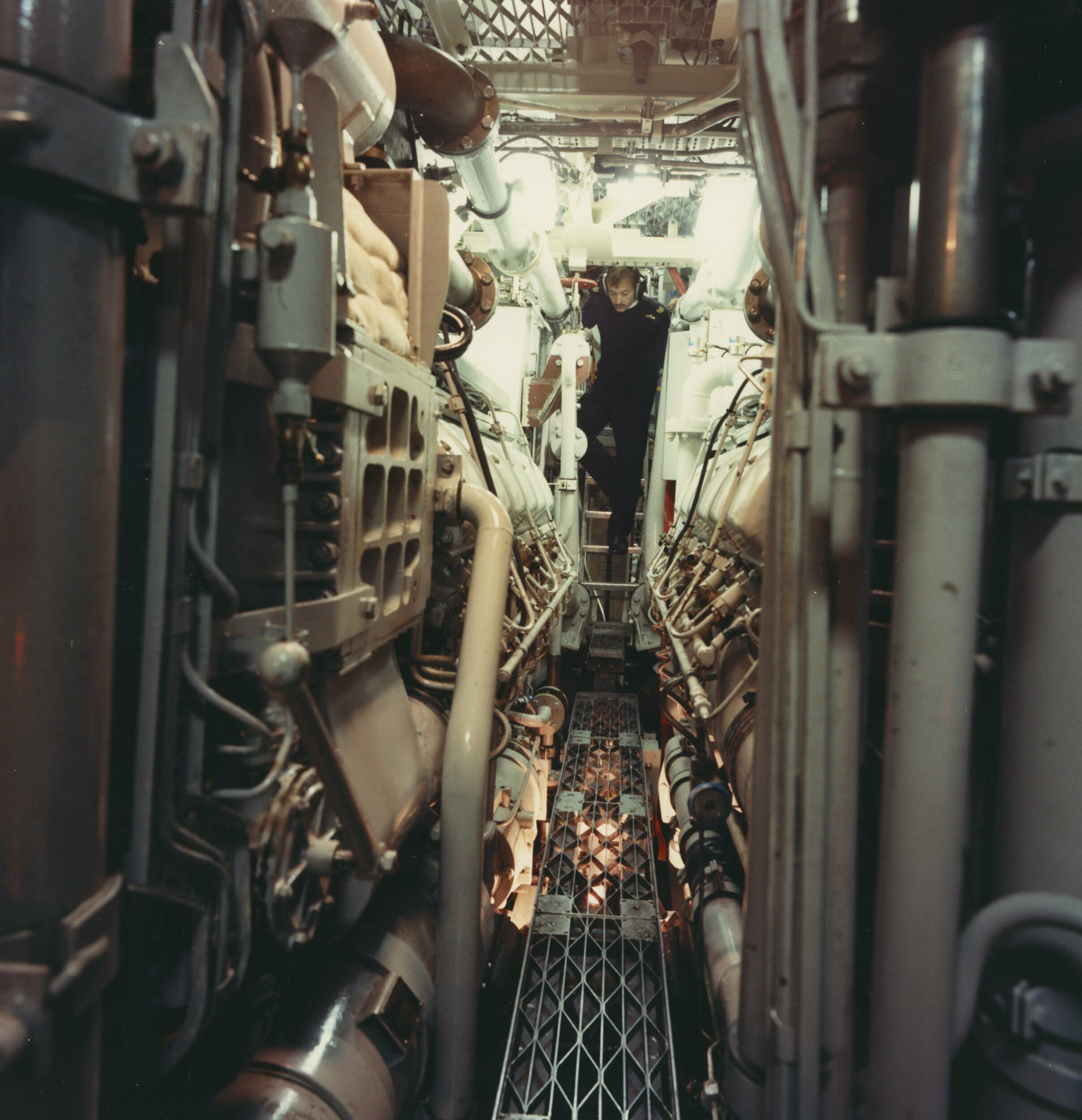
Engine room aboard Zeeleeuw

The Walrus-class submarines are used for the Submarine Command Course (SMCC) for both national and international candidates (including the UK, Australia and Canada), selecting and training future commanders of conventional submarines. They are highly rated, with an exceptional reputation. The Royal Netherlands Navy began this course after the British Royal Navy phased out their conventional submarines.

== Upgrade program ==
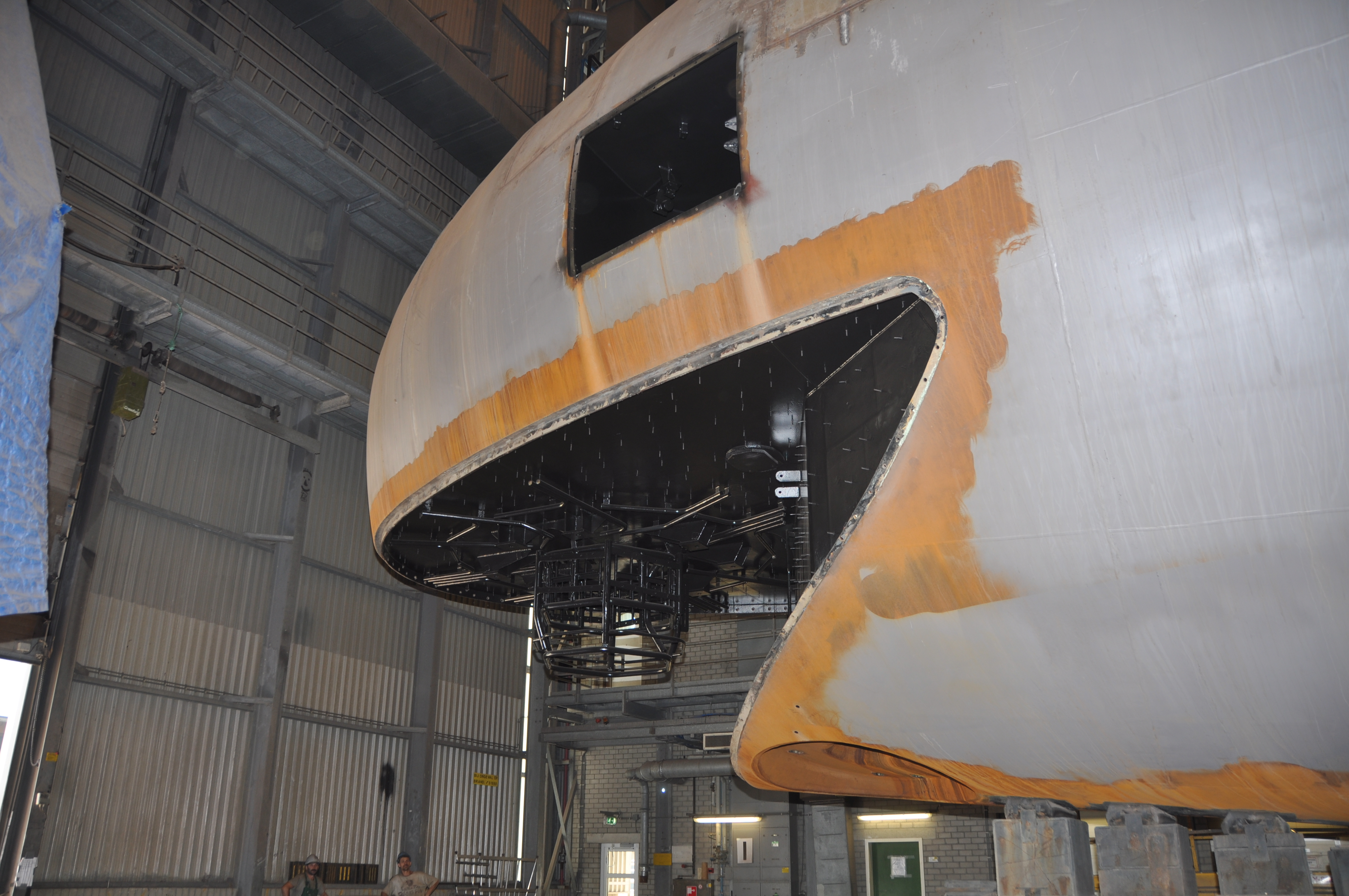
HNLMS Zeeleeuw being upgraded in 2014

In 2007, the Dutch cabinet approved an upgrade of the four operational submarines and recruitment of additional crew to improve overall operational availability. The upgrades were focused on near-shore operations and integration with new weapons, and include:

- The migration from the MK 48 mod-4 torpedo to the mod-7 version
- Replacing one periscope with a non-hull-penetrating optronic mast from L-3 KEO which enables the submarine to capture HD footage, both day and night
- Addition of a mine and obstacle avoidance sonar
- Refurbishing of the pressure hull
- Introduction of a new combat management system
- Modifications to support special operations forces

In 2013, the contract for the Walrus-class (IP-W) Conservation Program was signed. The program covered the preservation of the pressure skin, the replacement of the sonar, navigation periscope and GIPSY combat system, improved communication systems and adaptations to a number of platform systems. The Dutch industry and knowledge institutes were heavily involved in the program via the Dutch Underwater Knowledge Centre. It was predicted that the upgrade program would lead to an estimated 400.000 man-hours of work for each boat. All four boats were to be modernized by 2019. With the conservation program, the boats can be kept operational until mid-2025. The cost of upgrading the four submarines was estimated to be 94 million euros. The first boat to be upgraded was Zeeleeuw, followed by Dolfijn, Bruinvis and Walrus. The upgrade of Zeeleeuw took longer than expected. Initially the upgrade was expected to have been completed by 2015, but it took until 2016 before the submarine was ready for service again. Currently, Bruinvis is being upgraded at the Den Helder naval base. The Royal Netherlands Navy has also begun to prepare for the replacement of the Walrus-class submarines.

== Replacement ==
In November 2014, the Dutch Minister of Defence announced plans to replace the Walrus-class submarines in 2025. By 2017, there was still no political agreement on the quantity or type of new submarines to be ordered, nor the tasks they were expected to perform. However, it seems certain that they will be replaced, since the alleged Russian threat was regarded an incentive to invest in a new class. The Minister of Defence, however, delayed the replacement by two years, until 2027. Roughly, there are two groups in the Dutch parliament – one in favor of replacing the Walrus class by an equally capable class of large, expeditionary, diesel-electric submarine, and the other in favor of choosing a cheaper solution of smaller diesel-electrics, similar to Swedish and German submarines. It is unknown where the new boats will be built; since the Dutch RDM shipyard (the only Dutch yard capable of building submarines) is no longer in operation. The Defensienota (Defense policy for the coming years) of March 2018 revealed that the Dutch government is still planning to replace the Walrus-class submarines, with an allocated budget of more than 2.5 billion euros for the new submarines. Additional information on how to proceed with the replacement was expected at the end of 2018, when the Dutch Minister of Defence, Ank Bijleveld, was to send a so-called B-letter to the Dutch parliament. Minister Bijleveld also underlined in an interview that the new submarines should have the same niche capabilities as the current Walrus-class submarines: the ability to operate and gather intelligence in both shallow water close to the coast and in deep water in the ocean. In mid-2021 it was indicated that a revised plan envisaged taking a replacement decision in 2022 and to have the first vessel in service by 2028, with the first two boats to be in service by 2031. However, in October 2021 it was reported that this timeline was no longer feasible. Instead, the Dutch Ministry of Defence signalled that the envisaged dates would have to be "substantially adjusted", possibly incorporating a life extension refit for the existing Walrus-class boats.

In April 2022 it was announced that two of the Walrus-class boats would be extended in service until the mid-2030s and that in order to do so safely a different maintenance approach would have to be adopted for the entire fleet with one of the four existing boats to be decommissioned in the short-term, followed by a second boat later. On 16 November 2022 it was revealed that Walrus would be the first boat to be decommissioned sometime in 2023. Walrus was decommissioned in October 2023. The revised schedule for the construction of the new replacement boats would likely see the first two vessels entering service in the 2034 to 2037 timeframe.

=== Contenders ===
The Ministry of Defence shortlisted three bidders:

- Damen Group and Saab Group announced that they had partnered from 2015 to jointly develop, offer and build next-generation submarines that are able to replace the current Walrus-class submarines. It was announced on 1 June 2018 that their design was to be derived from the A26 submarine. The proposed submarine is around 73 m (239 ft 6 in) long with a diameter of 8 m (26 ft 3 in). Furthermore, the displacement will be around 2,900 tonnes, with a complement of 34 to 42 personnel. The boat's armament includes 6 torpedo tubes and 1 multi-mission lock which can be used to deploy special forces.
- Naval Group announced that it was offering its newest submarine class, the Barracuda class, as replacement for the Walrus class. A version of the "Shortfin" diesel-electric variant Barracuda class was to be offered, rather than the nuclear variant used by the French Navy.
- ThyssenKrupp Marine Systems was planning to offer a Type 212CD submarine.

Spain's Navantia's S-80 was not accepted as a contender following the B-letter in 2019. In 2022 the Spanish Ministry of Defence sent a letter to the Dutch DMO for Navantia to be allowed to put in an offer following the announcement that a RFQ will be sent to the remaining contenders, in which some of the requirements had changed. It was rumoured that the request was denied by DMO.

On 16 November 2022 the RFQ was sent out to the three remaining shipyards. It was expected they would submit their bids around mid-2023. In June 2023 it was reported that the three shipyards had to submit their bids by 28 July 2023 at the latest.

=== Winning bid ===
On 15 March 2024 State Secretary for Defence Christophe van der Maat officially announced that Naval Group from France has been selected as the winning bid. Prior to this announcement, the winner was already leaked to several media outlets, which caused political backlash for choosing a foreign yard over a Dutch one.

The names of the new submarines were also announced by Van der Maat. The class will be known as the Orka class, with the subs named Orka, Zwaardvis, Barracuda and Tijgerhaai. The first two will be delivered within ten years after the contract has been signed.

== Ships in class ==
All boats were built by RDM.

Walrus class construction data
Ship name	Hull number	Laid down	Launched	Commissioned	Decommissioned	Status
Walrus	S802	11 October 1979	28 October 1985; 13 September 1989 (re-launched)	25 March 1992	12 October 2023	Decommissioned and used for spare parts.
Zeeleeuw	S803	24 September 1981	20 June 1987	25 April 1990		In service
Dolfijn	S808	12 June 1986	25 April 1990	29 January 1993		In service
Bruinvis	S810	14 April 1988	25 April 1992	5 July 1994		In service

== See also ==
- List of submarine classes in service

Equivalent submarines of the same era

- Collins class
- Oyashio class
- Project 636
- Hai Lung class
- Upholder/Victoria class
