= HNLMS Zeeleeuw (1987) =

Submarine

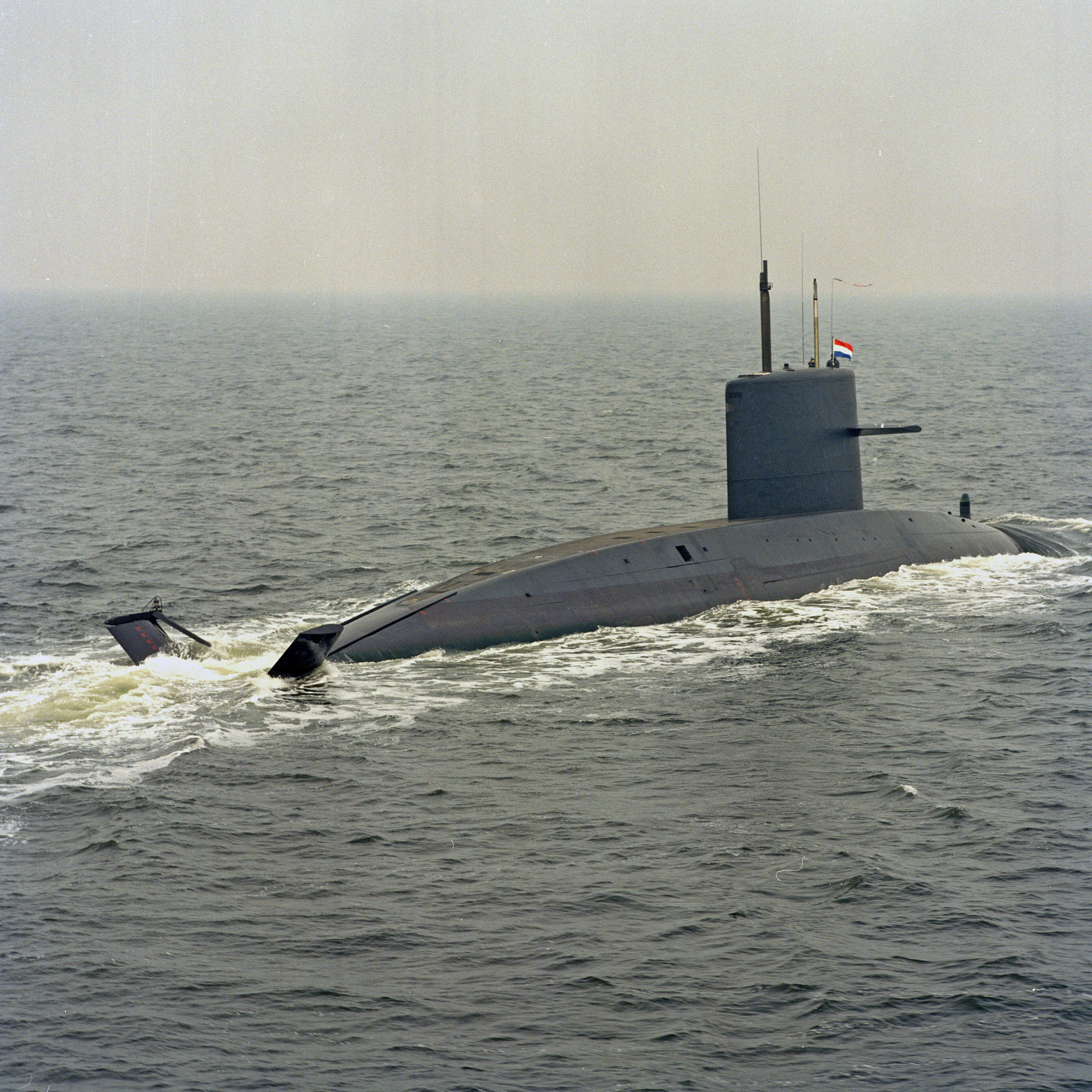
- Zeeleeuw in 1990

History

Netherlands
- Name: Zeeleeuw
- Namesake: Sea lion
- Builder: Rotterdamsche Droogdok Maatschappij
- Yard number: 349
- Laid down: 24 September 1981
- Launched: 20 June 1987
- Commissioned: 25 April 1990
- Identification: S803
- Motto: Op prooi belust; Dutch: Eager for prey
- Status: In active service
- Badge

General characteristics
- Class & type: Walrus-class submarine
- Displacement: 2350 t surfaced, 2650 t submerged, 1,900 t standard
- Length: 68 m (223 ft 1 in)
- Beam: 8.5 m (27 ft 11 in)
- Draught: 7.5 m (24 ft 7 in)
- Propulsion: Diesel-electric (3,132 kW)
- Speed: 11 knots (20 km/h; 13 mph) surfaced; 20 knots (37 km/h; 23 mph) submerged
- Test depth: 300 m (980 ft)
- Complement: 55
- Armament: Mark 48 torpedoes and Harpoon missiles

HNLMS Zeeleeuw (S803) is a Walrus-class submarine of the Royal Netherlands Navy. She entered service in 1990 as the first submarine of the Walrus class, after the intended lead ship, HNLMS Walrus, was delayed for a long period following a serious fire during construction. Zeeleeuw has been deployed both for naval exercises and in combat operations around the world. Furthermore, the submarine plays an important role by performing intelligence operations. The submarine has undergone a mid-life maintenance and upgrade program between 2014 and 2016, and is currently in active service.

== Maintenance and upgrade ==
In 2014 HNLMS Zeeleeuw was taken out of service after years of service by the Royal Netherlands Navy to perform maintenance and modernize its systems. During the upgrade program, the submarine was upgraded with modern systems. The ageing GIPSY combat system was replaced with the more modern Guardion combat system. Besides changing the software suite, hardware components were either replaced or upgraded with newer versions. The Medium Range Sonar (MRS) and Long Range Sonar (LRS) were replaced. A new sonar was added, the Mine and Obstacle Avoidance Sonar (MOAS). The consoles and screens in the command room were upgraded to more modern versions, while the navigation and attack periscopes went from being depended on analog sensors to digital sensors. This was done by replacing several masts. Lastly, the Mark 48 torpedoes were upgraded from mod 4 to the more recent mod 7. On 3 December 2015 the Zeeleeuw completed its maintenance and upgrade program and was put back in the water. That same month the Zeeleeuw also performed her first deep dive.

== Service history ==
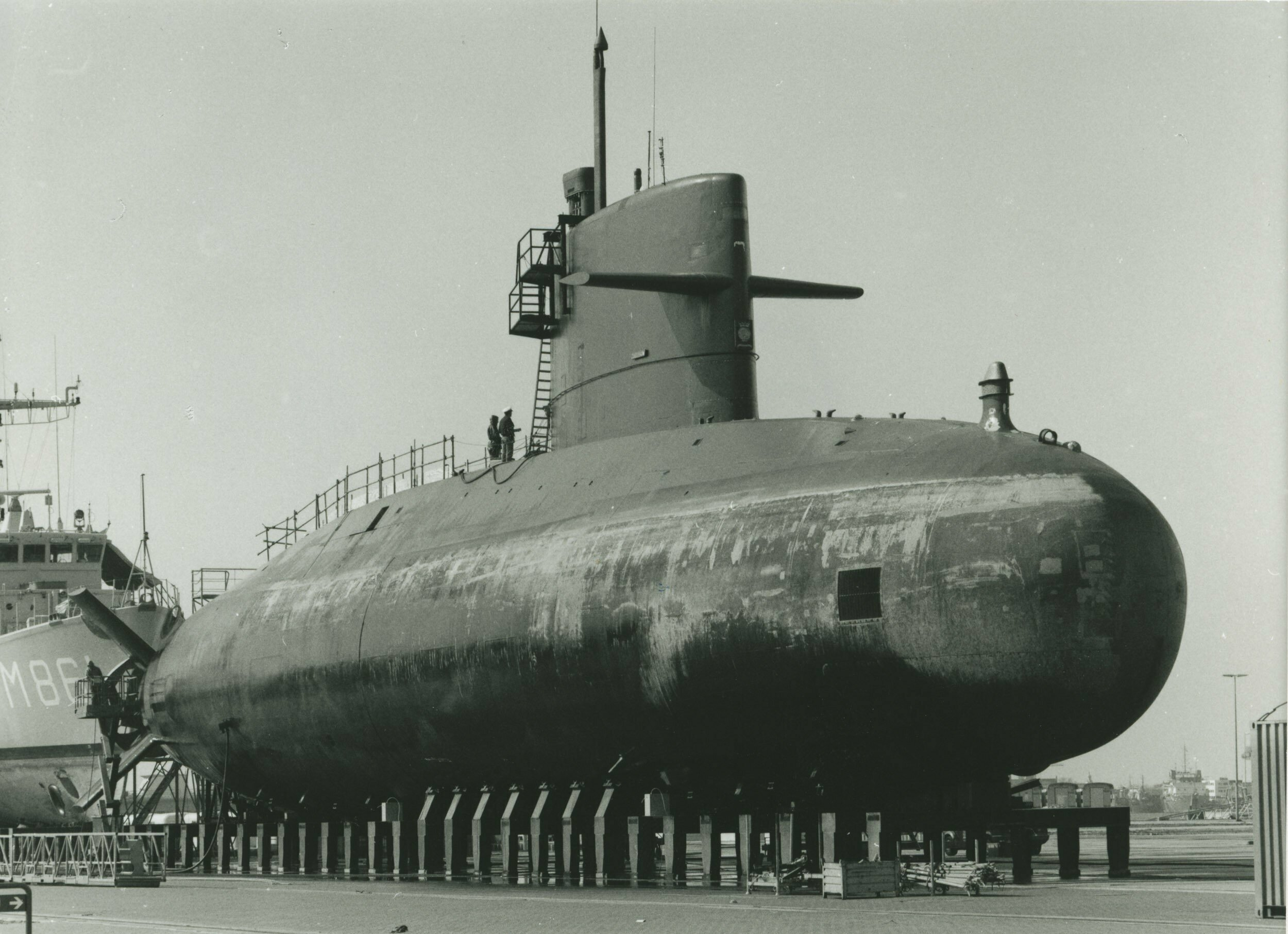
Zeeleeuw on scaffold in 1990 shortly after her commissioning in 1990.

On 28 October 1988 at 10 AM the Zeeleeuw began with her sea trials.

In 2010 HNLMS Zeeleeuw took part in Operation Ocean Shield.

In 2017 the Zeeleeuw took part in a torpedo firing exercise in the Bahamas. That same year the boat also took part in an exercise in the Caribbean Sea near Curaçao.

In June 2022 Zeeleeuw visited Scheveningen and stayed in port for a few days. During her stay in Scheveningen the submarine was open to pupils.

== See also ==
- Ships of the Royal Netherlands Navy
