= Rotterdamsche Droogdok Maatschappij =

Former shipyard in Rotterdam, Netherlands

Rotterdamsche Droogdok Maatschappij NV
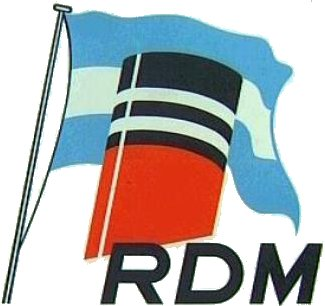

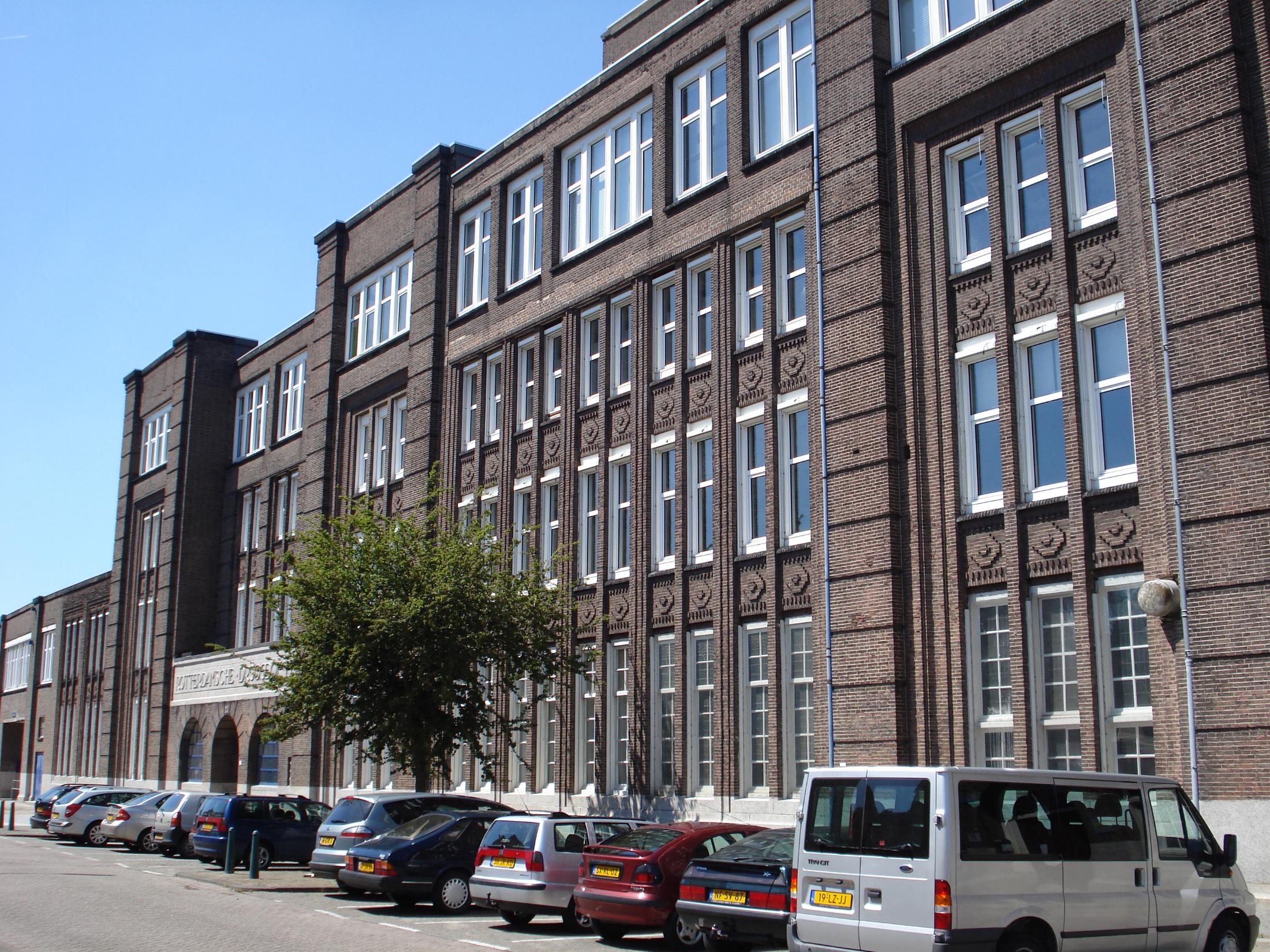
- Office of Rotterdamse Droogdokmaatschappij
- Company type: N.V.
- Industry: Shipbuilding; Ship repair
- Founded: 1902
- Defunct: 1996
- Fate: dissolved
- Headquarters: Rotterdam, the Netherlands
- Products: Civilian ships and warships

The Rotterdamsche Droogdok Maatschappij NV (RDM) was a major shipbuilding and repair company in Rotterdam in the Netherlands, existing from 1902 to 1996. It built 355 ships, 18 of which were submarines. During its existence, the shipyard operated 12 floating docks and employed 7,000 people at its peak.

== Establishment of the company ==
The Rotterdamsche Droogdok Maatschappij was a successor of the shipbuilding company De Maas, founded in Delfshaven in 1856 by Duncan Christie. De Maas was located in an area that is now the Sint Jobshaven in Rotterdam. The shipyard would have to move in 1905 because the lease on the land would end that year. On 14 February 1899 the company bought 4.5 hectares of land in Heijplaat, south of the Meuse for 44,000 guilders.

=== A consortium for a drydock company ===
On 14 April 1899 a consortium was founded by people connected to the harbor of Rotterdam and the company De Maas. It had two goals: First to try to continue the company De Maas, Second, to run one or more drydocks. The consortium was led by president A.G. Kröller of the Wm.H. Müller & Co. shipping line. It got more than 200 shares of De Maas at 25%, and the terrain on the Heijplaat became a common possession. This way the consortium became the dominant force in the shareholders meeting of De Maas. The plan of the consortium was to end De Maas and then to transfer the assets to the new company. On 10 June 1899 the consortium decided to build a floating drydock for ships of up to 12,000 tons displacement.

On 23 January 1902 the contract that established the Rotterdamsche Droogdok Maatschappij was signed. The company would have 1,000,000 guilders capital in 1,000 shares. The supervisory board of the RDM consisted of: H. de Jong of Phs. van Ommeren NV; J.P.J. Lucardie director of De Maas; Ir. J.F. Rebel engineer; Ph. W. van der Sleyden former minister of Rijkswaterstaat and L.W. Veder of Hudig & Blokhuyze. The supervisory board accepted the offer of the consortium of 207 shares in De Maas and the terrain on Heijplaat for 101,400 guilders. On 1 March 1902 the decision was made to liquidate De Maas.

=== The shipyard on Heijplaat ===
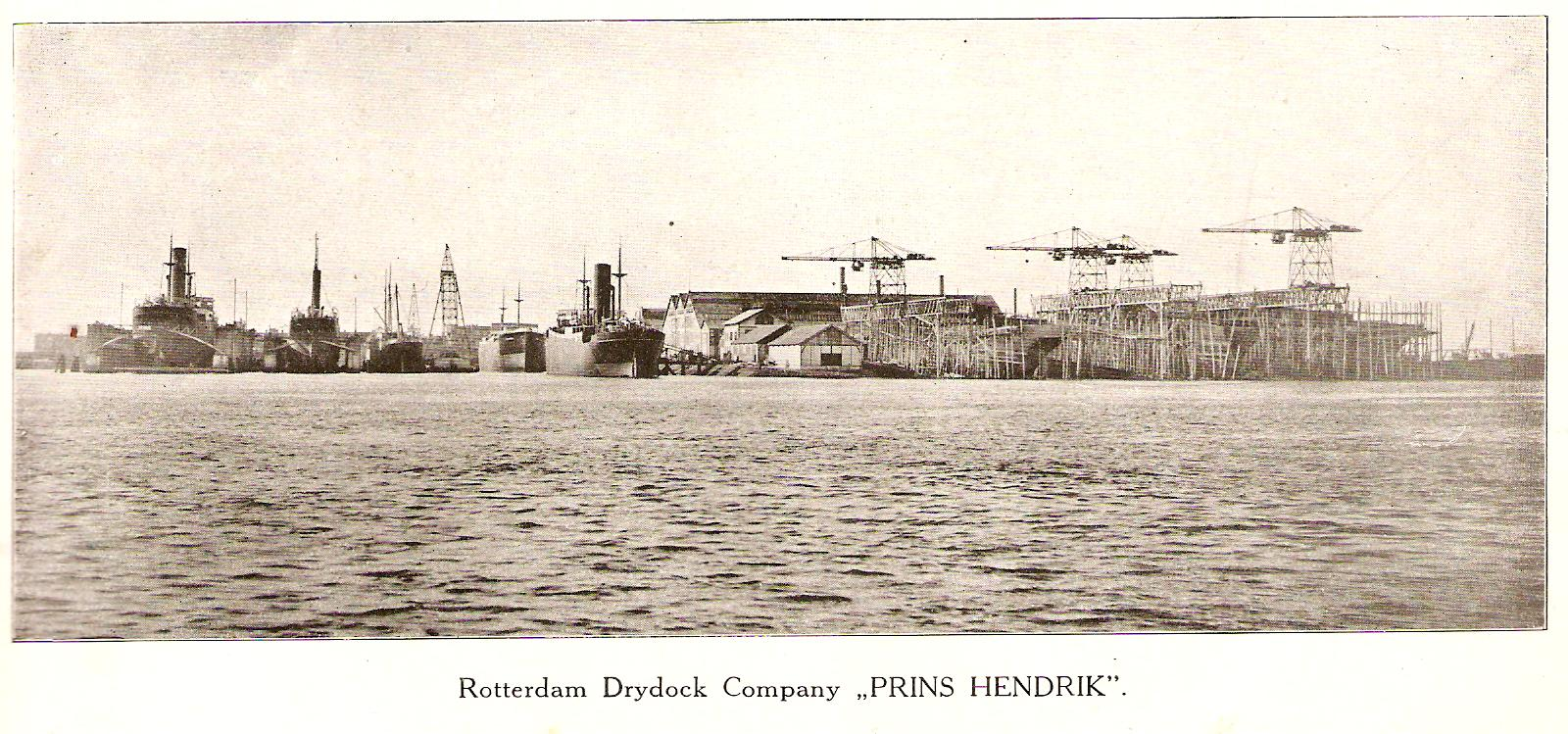
Rotterdam Drydock Company, 1918

For the CEO position the supervisory board wanted to have W. de Gelder working as an engineer in Kinderdijk. He had written a brochure that advocated the need for a modern drydock company west of the railway bridges over the Meuse. He did not want to become the new CEO, but his brother Ir. M.G. de Gelder, chief of the technical service of Bureau Veritas did accept. He called in his father A.J. de Gelder, former chief of the Dutch East Indies 'Waterstaat'. In fall 1901 father and son De Gelder had started the design of the shipyard on Heijplaat. The plan included a sketch for the location of the buildings and machinery, and in more detail the location of drydock basin. Most of the buildings were projected on the west side of the terrain. During 1902 the RDM also succeeded in getting a lease on 9 more hectares of land on Heijplaat. The ground which was dug out for making the dock basin (harbor for the floating docks) was used to heighten the terrain, which was regularly flooded up till then.

Most activities took place in the main building. It measured 75 m by 48 m and had iron foundations and an iron upper structure. The machine factory, model room and carpentry shop were located in another building on the south side of the terrain. There were also offices, a house for the chief engineer, and a house for the chiefs. A power plant had two steam engines of 450 ihp each, with boilers and dynamo's. It provided electricity for the pumps of the drydocks as well as for the machinery and lights on the rest of the shipyard. The steam engines and boilers were built by RDM, but the power plant as a whole was made by machine factory 'Voorheen Gebr. Figee' from Haarlem. A new boiler factory was equipped with a hydraulic riveting machine.

The assets which came in from De Maas consisted of a big inventory and many tools, and above all 300 experienced employees. The machinery of De Maas was generally too outdated to be of use. During 1904 the last parts of De Maas were brought to the new shipyard. The buildings of De Maas were then sold. RDM only held on to the old boiler factory for five more months.

=== The first floating drydocks ===
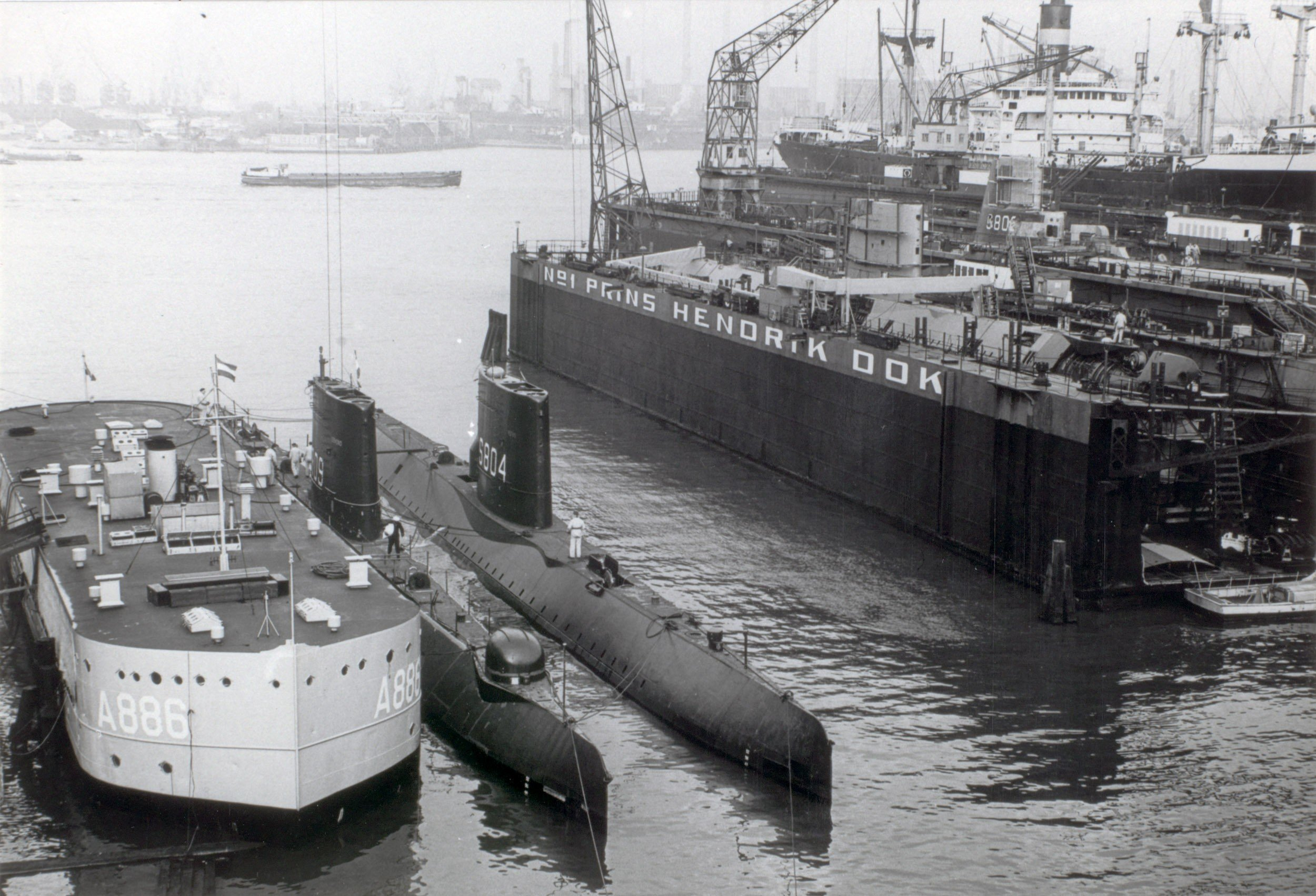
Prins Hendrik Dok I in 1971 with Tijgerhaai under construction

On 18 July 1902 the order for two floating drydocks was given to William Hamilton and Company in Port Glasgow. The cost for both drydocks together was 950,000 guilders. The delivery and opening of the biggest dock was to coincide with the opening of the Shipyard at Heijplaat on 3 October 1903. Even though the big drydock was not completely ready, the opening of the shipyard took place on the planned date. The small drydock was named Prins Hendrik-dok I and the big drydock Prins Hendrik-dok II,

The small drydock Prins Hendrik-dok I would be suitable for ships of up to 350 feet and 3,000 tons It would be operated by electric engines driving four pumps. On 13 July 1903 Prins Hendrik-dok I was towed into the dock harbor. It had been towed from Scotland by the tugboats Zwarte Zee and Lauwerszee of Smit's tugboat service. On 13 August Prins Hendrik-dok I was taken into service. The passenger ship Batavier I of the Batavier Line was the first ship to use the floating drydock.

The big drydock also known as Prins Hendrik-dok II would have a lift capacity of 8,000 tons and be suitable for ships of up to 500 feet length. The big drydock was 438 feet long, 96 feet 6 inches wide and could lift 7,500 tons. It was of the self-docking type made of 6 six connected, but different pontoons. Each of these could be decoupled so it could be repaired and painted. It was operated electrically and had six 16 inch centrifugal pumps. Each of these could pump 1200 tons of water in an hour. Each pump had its own engine powered by an electrical power station on shore. On 31 July 1903 the first part of the drydock was launched, and in the evening the second part. The big drydock had a rough journey in the Irish Sea. It faced such bad weather that the tugboats were steaming for days without making progress. The weather also significantly damaged the drydock. On 3 September 1903 the big drydock arrived in Rotterdam. The Spanish steamer Noviembre was the first ship that tried to use it. The dock could not be made dry, and so the Noviembre left it again on 25 September and went to a community drydock. The problems were solved by 25 November 1903. On 30 December 1903 the final trials were held when the big steamer Lübeck from Lübeck used the dock.

== Early years ==
=== The first ships ===
The necessity to build ships was caused by the nature of the drydock business. Drydocks generated a good margin, but during the moments that they were not occupied they made a big loss. Therefore, drydock companies often built ships, so the employees could work on these while the drydocks were less busy. This was also how competitor Wilton's Dok- en Werf Maatschappij operated. During 1904 RDM would dock 145 ships totaling 305,020 tons in 518 days.

The first ships built by RDM were still built on the terrain of De Maas, or were even ships started by De Maas. The latter was undoubtedly the case with the big dredging vessel launched on 13 August 1903. RDM built the engines for a special ship built for P. van Ommeren, SS Sliedrecht, which was launched on 22 April 1905 by Crags & Sons in Middlesbrough. On 22 July 1905 Sliedrecht made its trials, and about two months later the Holland-Gulf Maatschappij contracted for the Alwina. The Alwina was the first sea ship that the RDM would build. With all possible speed a slipway of reinforced concrete was ordered from the Hollandsche Maatschappij tot het maken van Werken in Gewapend Beton from Den Haag. The Disconto Bank aided in financing a bending roll and a planer. The second order came from the Noord-Nederlandsche Scheepvaart Maatschappij from Harlingen, which ordered the Constance Catharina. Soon other orders followed.

=== The shipbuilding branch grows ===
Up to 1908 the shipbuilding business went very well. By 1909 the shipyard had three slipways for ships of up to 110 m long. It had a drydock harbor of about three hectares that housed the drydocks of 3,000 and 7,500 tons capacity. As regards buildings it had an ironworkers building of about 2,000 m2; a woodworkers building with model room of about 1,350 m2 and the machine factory of c. 3,600 m2 that housed the smithy, boiler factory, metal workings, offices and administrative rooms.

In 1910 the market recovered. On 27 September 1910 RDM tried the new floating sheerleg Bison of 66 tons lift capacity. It was built by RDM, and had a relatively large reach, so it could load from ships that were on a drydock, or positioned behind another ship. The Bison could also be hired. Also in 1910, the Stoomvaart Maatschappij Nederland ordered the freighter Kambangan. She made her trials in December 1911. Her measurements were 430x55x37 feet with a cargo capacity of 8,650 tons. The engines delivered 4,250 ihp for a speed of c. 13 knots. An identical ship, the Krakatau was built by Fijenoord and launched on 16 March 1912. For the RDM it meant that at that moment it was building the biggest ship to date constructed in the Netherlands. The fact that Hamilton built the identical Karimoen and Karimata, and that the Kangean was built by Northumberland Shipbuilding company in Howdon on Tyne puts things into perspective. However that may be, on the level of the RDM itself business was booming. In 1911 Van Ommeren ordered the tanker Mijdrecht. On 10 October 1912 she was launched. Mijdrecht was 325 feet long, had a beam of 47 feet and a hold of 24 feet. Cargo capacity was 3,500 ton, power 1,500 ihp for a speed of 10.5 knots. The construction, more specifically the riveting of the tanks, gave so much trouble that RDM and Firma Ph. van Ommeren suffered significant losses. On 25 October 1912 RDM laid down the first Dutch ship with a steam turbine. She was delivered as Turbinia on 27 July 1915.

=== Competitor Scheepsbouw Maatschappij Nieuwe Waterweg ===
On 10 June 1914 the competitor Scheepsbouw Maatschappij Nieuwe Waterweg was founded. It was modeled on the RDM, and persuaded many employees and key figures of the RDM to come work for her.

== World War I ==
World War I caused significant problems in the supply of the necessary materials for new ships. In general it was very profitable for Dutch shipbuilders, especially in the first years of the war. Four new ships were built in 1914 and due to the extraordinarily busy first half of 1913, the overall docking turnover for 1914 still surpassed that of 1914. 1915 was also a good year for RDM, with 8 ships delivered. In 1916 6 ships were delivered, while the docking branch of the company made good profits. In 1917 the RDM results finally decreased. In that year only four new ships were delivered. In 1918 the war finally hit the RDM, with not a single ships using the docks in August 1918. The complete cessation of the import of raw materials caused that not a single ship was delivered in 1918. However, the year 1918 was still closed with a profit.

== Interwar period ==
On 14 January 1925, a shipbuilding facility was set up as a subsidiary on the northern bank in Schiedam and continued to function as a separate establishment until 1978.

In 1928/29 the so-called 'Onderzeebootloods' (submarine hall) was built. This was enlarged three times. Here, 17 Dutch and 1 Polish submarine were constructed. Two of the subs fell into German hands in May 1940, and duly served in the Kriegsmarine, the navy of Nazi Germany. The Germans also found the snorkel here, a Dutch invention. This apparatus allows subs to use their diesel engines under water, greatly extending their range, and subsequently all German U-boats were equipped with this. The hall is now part of the so-called RDM Campus, a combination of research and development companies and a college.

In 1938, the RDM bought, with Wilton-Fijenoord, all shares of P. Smit Jr. Shipbuilding and Machine Factory of D.G. van Beuningen. This company remained under its own name during its existence.

== World War II ==
During World War II, the company fell into German hands undamaged and intact, regardless of having been a major arms supplier to the Royal Dutch Navy. The management decided to continue business as usual, although the representative of Queen Wilhelmina (who herself had fled to the United Kingdom), General Henri Winkelman, expressly forbade any work on German military projects. Work on Dutch military products could be continued.

A secret policy of clandestine opposition and dragging of feet was developed in the first months of the war, with the full support of the management. The main goal was to protect the work force from deportation. In 1942 nevertheless, some 250 men had to go and do forced labour ('Arbeitseinsatz') in Germany, for shipbuilders Blohm und Voss in Hamburg. Wartime production achieved only half that of peacetime. After the war, none of the directors were indicted for collaboration.

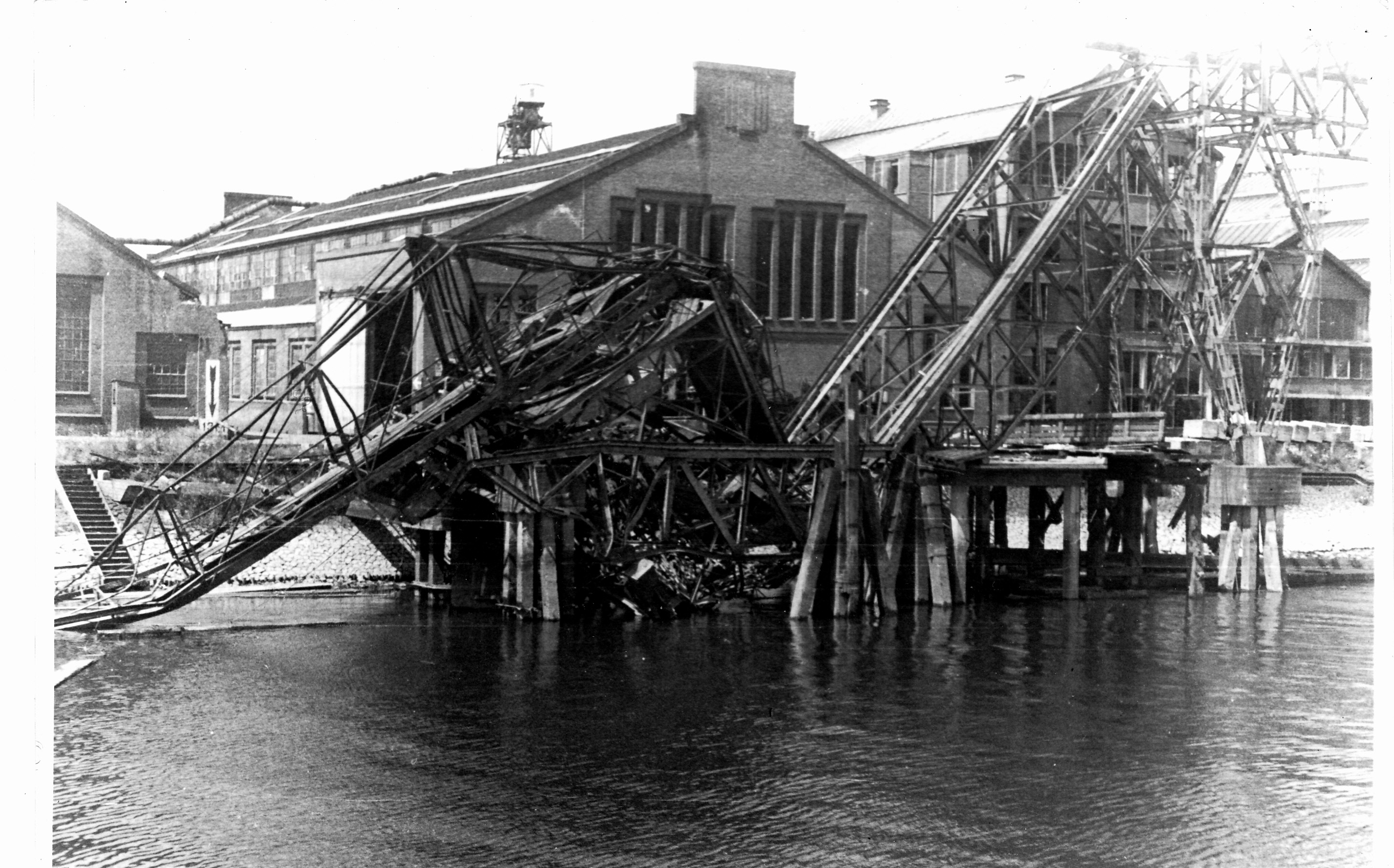
Destroyed installations of the RDM (1945).

In total the RDM completed 32 vessels during the war, 24 of which were smaller war ships for the Kriegsmarine. The shipbuilding company became an accepted target for the Royal Air Force, and in 1941 a German ship under repair was sunk in an air attack, with two people killed. No substantial damage to the wharf was done by the Allies during the war.

However, after the start of Operation Market Garden on September 17, 1944, the Nazi German occupiers in the Netherlands decided to destroy all major ports, port facilities and infrastructure in the Netherlands. As a result, the RDM was nearly completely wrecked: the floating docks were ravaged and sunk and all major cranes blown up. The Germans also looted any production means such as lorries and lathes and took away any remaining supplies. Within six months following the end of the war, four floating docks were salvaged and repaired.

== After the war ==
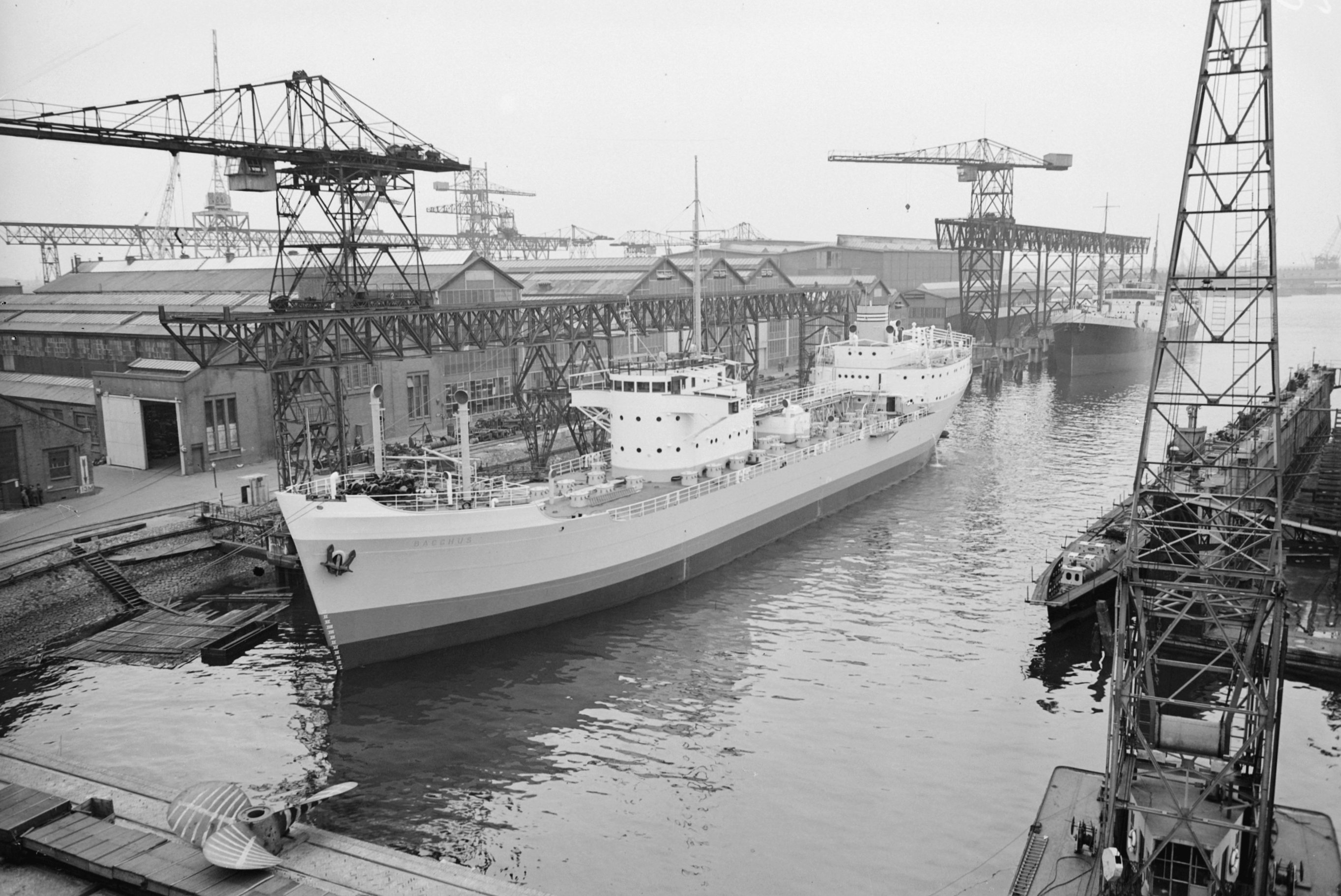
The shipyard in 1949

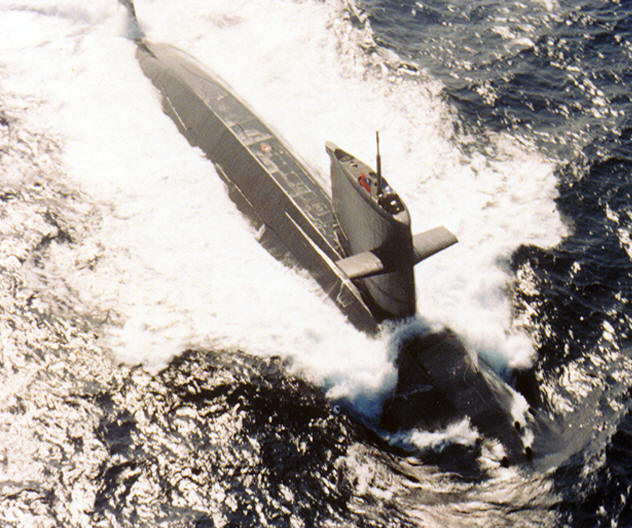
ROCS Hai Lung-class submarine

On 4 March 1966, in a merger with Koninklijke Maatschappij De Schelde and Motorenfabriek Thomassen led to the creation of Rijn-Schelde Machinefabrieken en Scheepswerven (RSMS), and a further merger on 1 January 1971 with Verolme Verenigde Scheepswerven (VVS) led to the united company of Rijn-Schelde-Verolme Machinefabrieken en Scheepswerven (RSV).

On 6 April 1983 the bankruptcy concerning RSV and RDM was announced. The offshore department was closed and the repair department transferred to Wilton-Fijenoord, by means of sale of the two largest docks. Of the 3,180 employees, 1,370 people became unemployed. The still viable components, the naval and the tool and heavy machinery businesses, were categorised in a new company: RDM Nederland BV, property of the government.

Naval construction got a large boost by the orders for four Walrus-class submarines for the Royal Netherlands Navy. However, the proposed sale of four additional submarines to Taiwan worth US$6 billion failed to materialize, after the Dutch government blocked the purchase due to Chinese pressure. As ship building orders declined, and the company became more involved in high technology systems development for the military and energy sectors, the name of the company was again changed, this time to RDM Technology. The naval section eventually became Damen Schelde Naval Shipbuilding, owned by the Damen Group.

On 20 December 1991, the company was sold by the government to the Royal Begemann Group of Joep van den Nieuwenhuyzen, and renamed RDM Technology Holding BV. Due to a lack of orders, employment was cut from nearly 1,200 to under 500 during reorganizations in 1993 and 1994, while the departments were divided into RDM Technology BV and RDM Submarines BV.

In 1996, these companies were privately obtained by van der Nieuwenhuyzen. They were used for several activities and financial operations in the weapons industry, but no longer in association with the company's original shipbuilding activities. The shipyard itself was eventually acquired by the city of Rotterdam. The former shipyard was leased in perpetuity to the Port of Rotterdam in 2004. The site has since been redeveloped into the RDM Campus.

== Products ==
The primary business of RDM had always been ship repair in its drydock facility, although it also built several new vessels over the years. The company also became a strong competitor in building equipment for offshore drilling by the mid-1960s.

== Ships built ==
Ships built by RDM include:

- Navy ships

| Name | Launched | Note |
Cruisers
| De Zeven Provinciën | 1950 | |
Destroyers
| Gerard Callenburgh | 1939 | |
| Tjerk Hiddes | 1939 | not completed due to WWII |
| Holland | 1953 | |
| Rotterdam | 1956 | |
Submarines
| K XIV | 1931 | |
| K XV | 1932 | |
| K XVI | 1933 | |
| Sęp | 1938 | |
| O 23 | 1939 | |
| O 24 | 1940 | |
| O 26 | 1940 | |
| O 27 | 1941 | |
| Dolfijn | 1959 | |
| Zeehond | 1960 | |
| Tijgerhaai | 1971 | |
| Zwaardvis | 1970 | |
| Walrus | 1985 | |
| Zeeleeuw | 1987 | |
| Dolfijn | 1990 | |
| Bruinvis | 1992 | |
Replenishment ships
| Poolster | 1963 | |
Sloop
| Van Kinsbergen | 1939 | |

- Passenger ships
  - SS Nieuw Amsterdam, launched in 1937
  - SS Rotterdam, laid down in 1956, launched in 1958
- Dry dock
  - Prins Hendrik, 1933 - renamed Scotiadock by Halifax Shipyard 1979 and scrapped 1999

=== Reactor vessels for nuclear plants ===
Rotterdam Drydocks built 22 reactor vessels for nuclear plants all over the world. These include:

- The Netherlands:
  - Borssele (1 reactor)
- Belgium:
  - Doel-3
  - Tihange-2
- There are further vessels for reactors in: Argentina (1), Germany (2), Spain (2), USA (10), Sweden (1) and Switzerland (2).

In the Belgian reactor vessels, numerous tiny faults were found during the 2012 maintenance inspections, with unknown consequences for the near future of these two reactors.
