= HNLMS Walrus (1985) =

Submarine

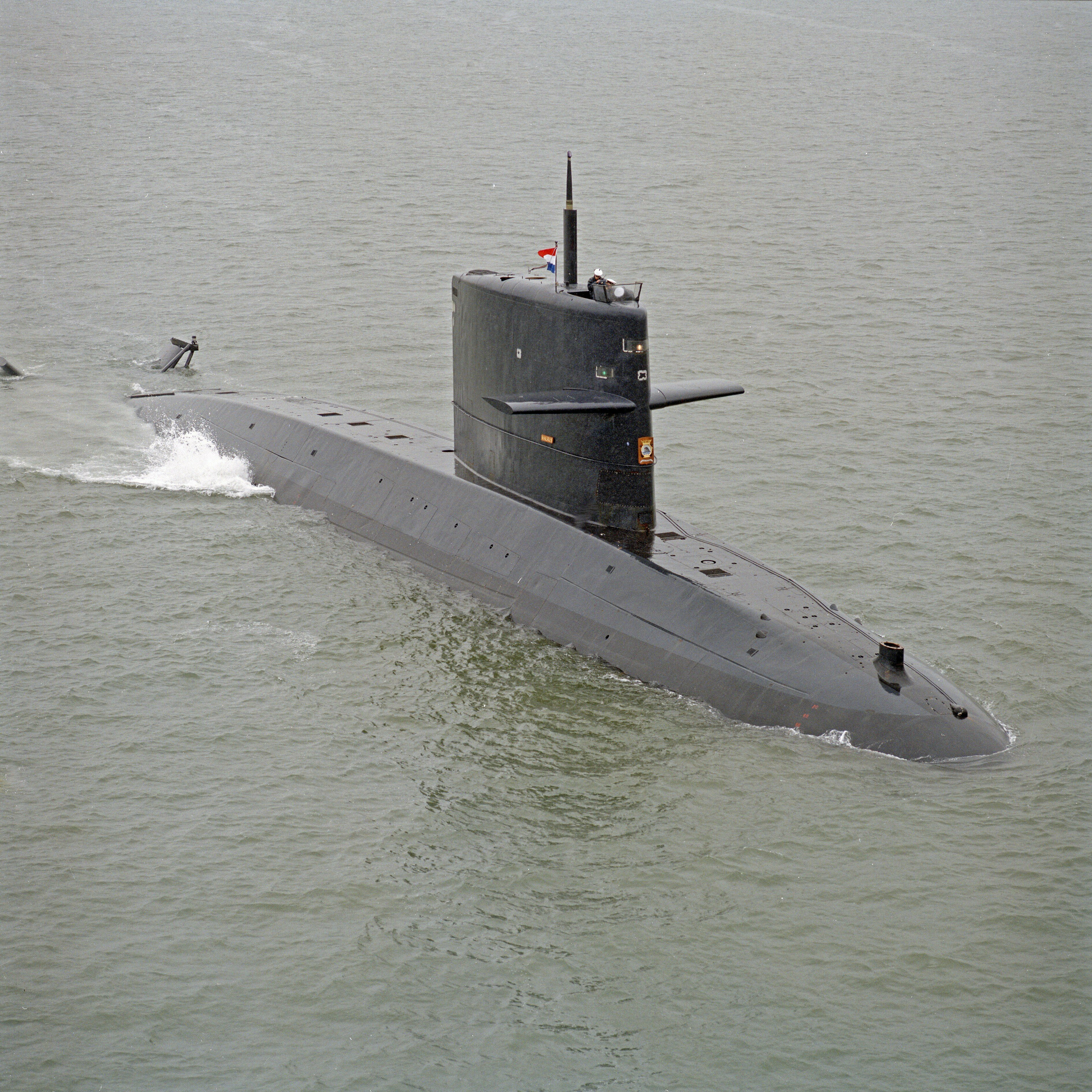
- HNLMS Walrus (S802) in 1996

History

Netherlands
- Name: Walrus
- Namesake: Walrus
- Builder: Rotterdamsche Droogdok Maatschappij, Rotterdam
- Yard number: RDM-348
- Laid down: 11 October 1979
- Launched: 28 October 1985
- Completed: 13 September 1989
- Commissioned: 25 March 1992
- Out of service: 12 October 2023
- Identification: S802
- Motto: Tand om tand; Dutch: A tooth for a tooth
- Status: Decommissioned
- Badge

General characteristics
- Class & type: Walrus-class submarine
- Displacement: 2,450 t (2,411 long tons; 2,701 short tons) surfaced; 2,800 t (2,756 long tons; 3,086 short tons) submerged
- Length: 68 m (223 ft 1 in)
- Beam: 8.5 m (27 ft 11 in)
- Draught: 7.5 m (24 ft 7 in)
- Propulsion: Diesel-electric (3,132 kW)
- Speed: 11 knots (20 km/h; 13 mph) surfaced; 20 knots (37 km/h; 23 mph) submerged
- Test depth: 300 m (980 ft)
- Complement: 55
- Armament: Mark 48 torpedoes; Harpoon missiles

HNLMS Walrus (S802) was a Walrus-class submarine of the Royal Netherlands Navy. After a long delay following a serious fire during construction, the submarine entered service in 1992. Walrus was deployed both for naval exercises and in combat operations around the world. She was decommissioned in October 2023.

== Ship history ==
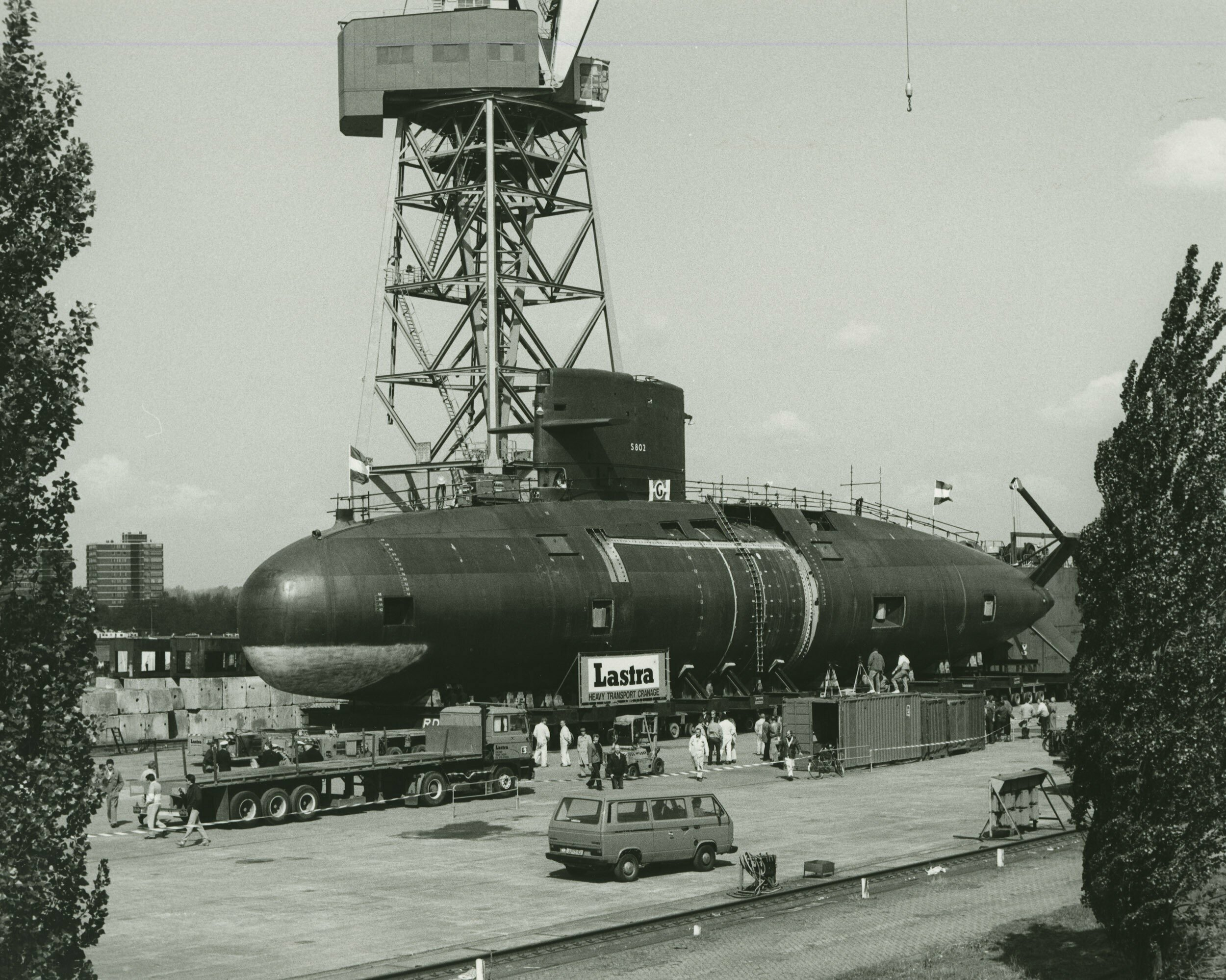
Walrus in 1987 after her repairs following an electrical fire.

Walrus was laid down on 11 October 1979 at the Rotterdamsche Droogdok Maatschappij ("Rotterdam Dry Dock Company") yard in Rotterdam. She was launched on 28 October 1985, but on 14 August 1986 an electrical fire broke out on board causing damage costing ƒ225 million(€100 million) to repair. Her completion was delayed until 13 September 1989. Sea trials were carried out in 1990 and 1991, and the submarine was commissioned on 25 March 1992.

As part of the Netherlands contribution to NATO, Walrus took part in various joint exercises, including Submarine Rescue Exercise "Sorbet Royal 96" and "Northern Light 99". During the multi-national "Joint Task Force Exercise/Theatre Missile Defence Initiative 1999" (JTFEX/TMDI99) Walrus successfully penetrated the U.S. Navy screen and "sank" several ships, including the aircraft carrier USS Theodore Roosevelt before escaping.

In 2000 she participated in a British Flag Officer Sea Training exercise, and in "Linked Seas 2000", a naval control of shipping exercise in the North Atlantic. In September 2000 all four Walrus-class boats were withdrawn from service after micro-fractures and corrosion was detected in the diesel engine exhaust valves. After replacement valves were fitted Walrus returned to active service in early 2001. From September to December 2002 Walrus took part in "Operation Enduring Freedom", acting as an COMINT intelligence gathering post in the Arabian Sea and the Persian Gulf.

In 2007 she took part in exercises in the Caribbean Sea with special forces of the Netherlands Marine Corps. During its time in the Caribbean it also gathered intelligence.

In 2008 it was announced the Netherlands will spend up to 100 million euros ($155 million) on a programme to upgrade all four Walrus-class submarines. These improvements will keep them operational until at least 2025.

On 13 May 2013 Dutch Ministerie van Defensie signed a contract worth EUR94 million (USD120.3 million) with Imtech Marine Netherlands to begin the life-extension programme for the four Walrus-class boats. Walrus was to be the last of the class to undergo refit and upgrade and was scheduled to return to operational service in 2019. That same year Walrus, together with Mercuur, helped test the new MANTA system that would be installed on the Walrus class submarines during the modernization program. The tests of this new sonar system took place in the Norwegian fjords.

In October 2023 Walrus was withdrawn from service, and is to be used for parts.

On Oct 12, 2026, she left her home port of Den Helder for the very last time, heading to Amsterdam on the barge 'H-331', which was towed by 'Eems Warrior', in order to be scrapped. Walrus arrived Monday evening in Amsterdam. Here she will be dismantled, scrapped and recycled, with some of the material also being melted down. It is expected to take two to three months.

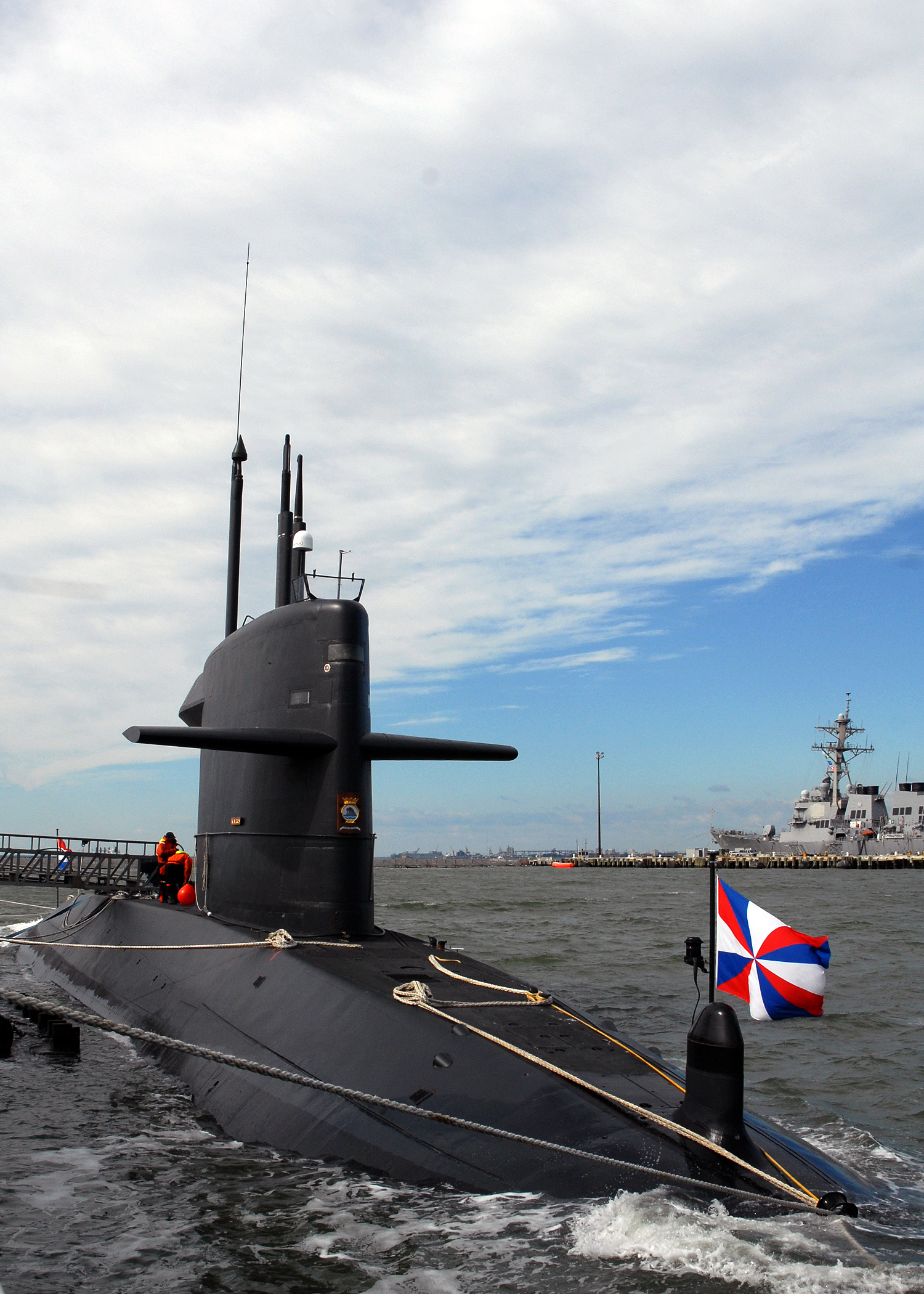
HNLMS Walrus (SSK S802) moored pierside at Naval Station Norfolk

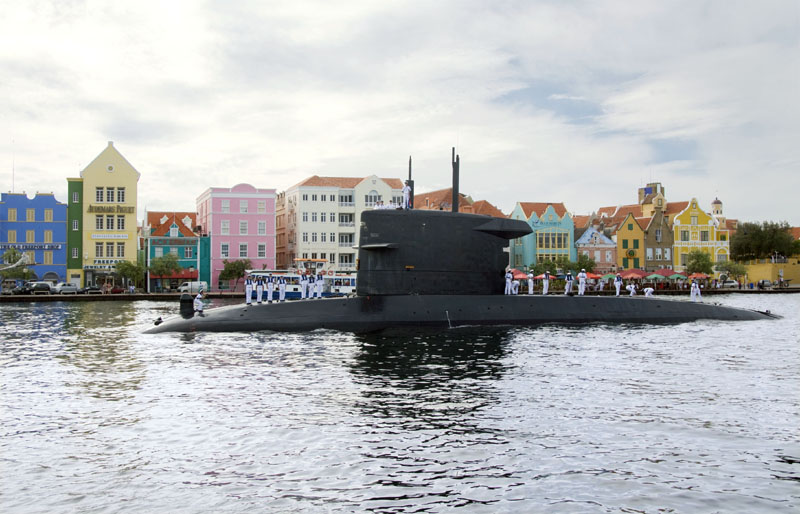
HNLMS Walrus at Curaçao

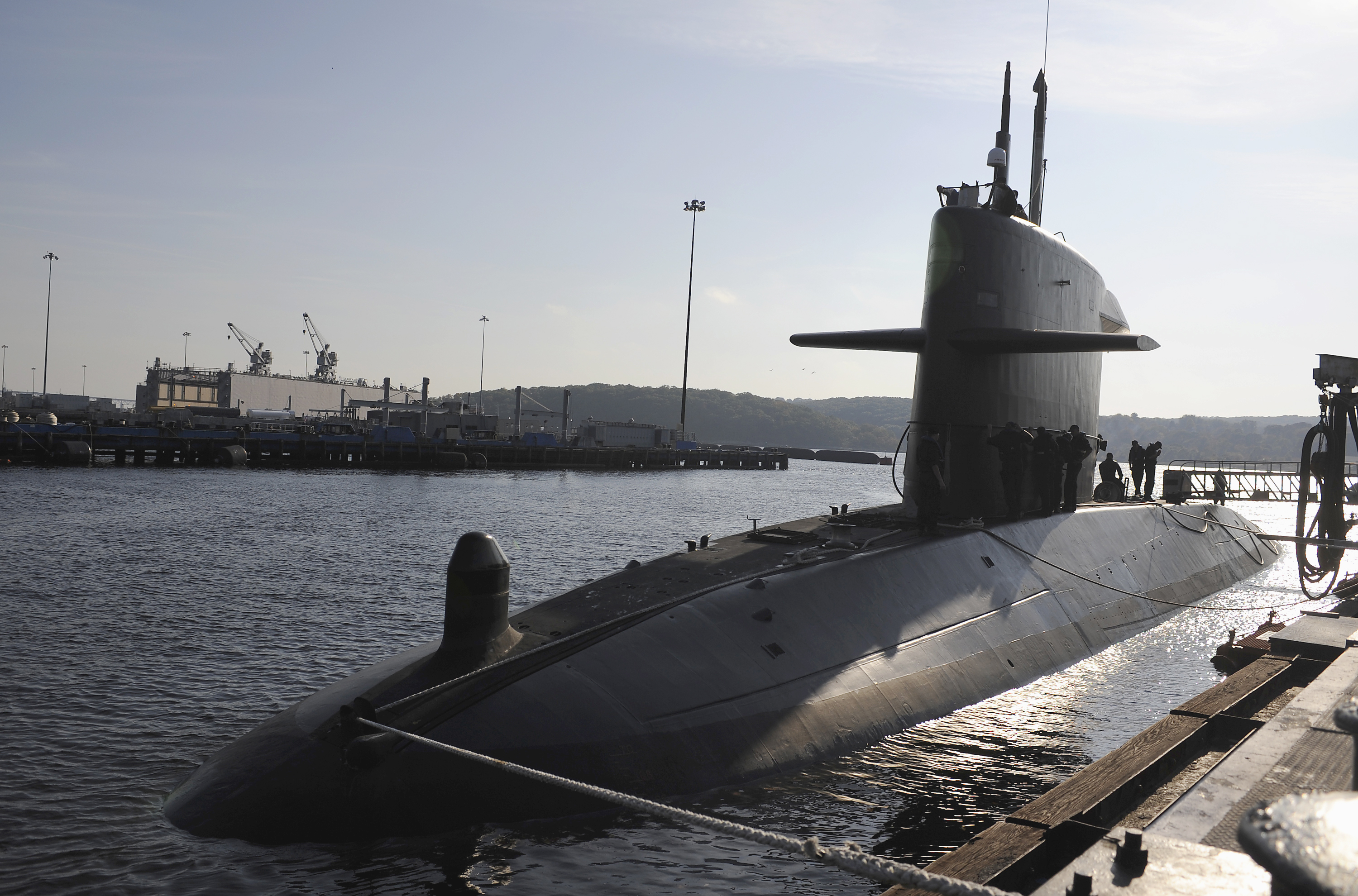
HNLMS Walrus (S802) moored at Submarine Base New London.
