= HY-80 =

Alloy steel

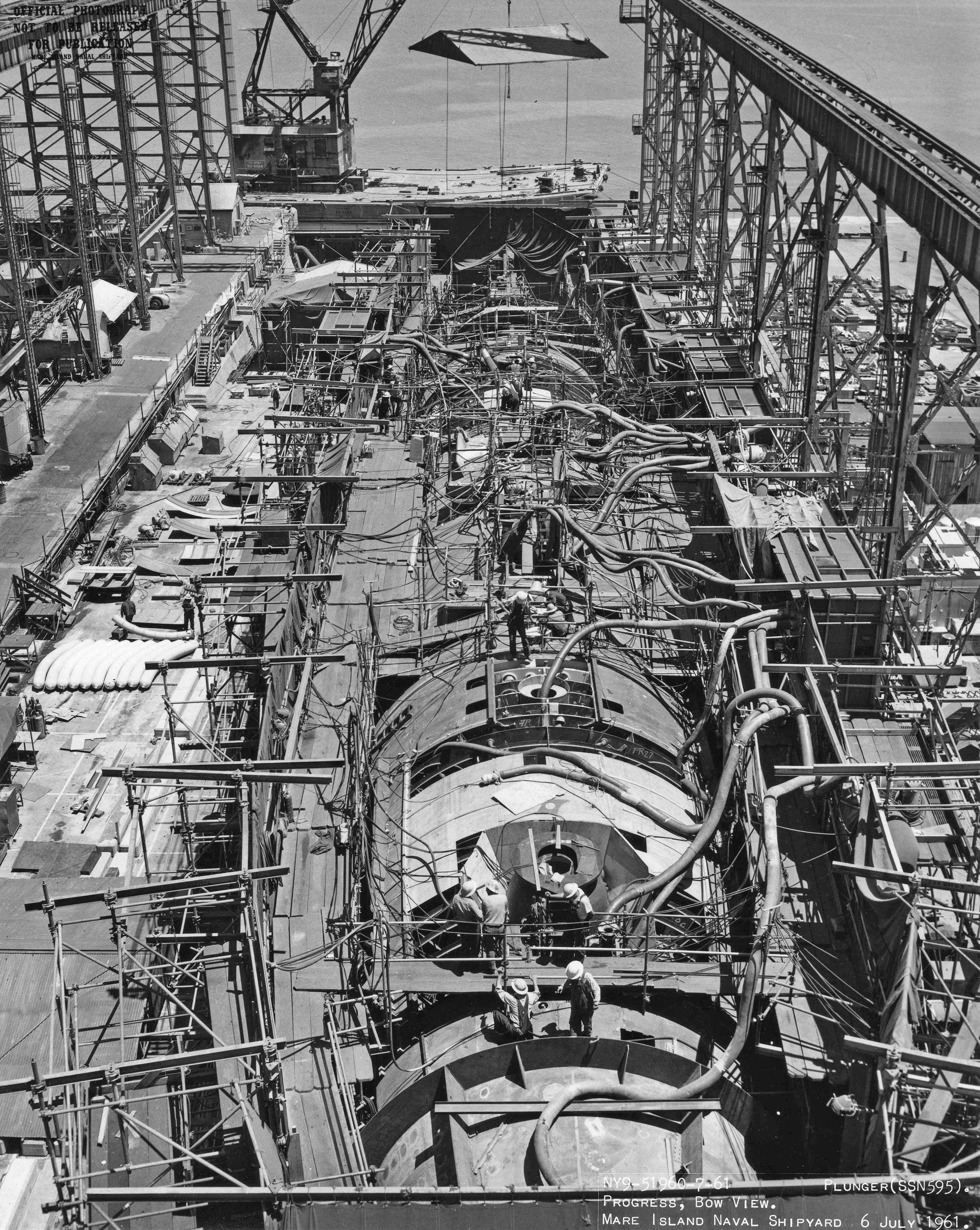
Permit class USS Plunger on the building ways at Mare Island

HY-80 is a high-tensile, high yield strength, low alloy steel. It was developed for use in naval applications, specifically the development of pressure hulls for the US nuclear submarine program, and is still used in many naval applications. It is valued for its strength to weight ratio.

The "HY" steels are designed to possess a high yield strength (strength in resisting permanent plastic deformation). HY-80 is accompanied by HY-100 and HY-130 with each of the 80, 100 and 130 referring to their yield strength in ksi (80,000 psi, 100,000 psi and 130,000 psi). Modern steel manufacturing methods that can precisely control time/temperature during processing of HY steels have made the cost to manufacture more economical. HY-80 is considered to have good corrosion resistance and has good formability to supplement being weldable. Using HY-80 steel requires careful consideration of the welding processes, filler metal selection and joint design to account for microstructure changes, distortion and stress concentration.

== Submarines ==
The need to develop improved steels was driven by a desire for deeper-diving submarines. To avoid detection by sonar, submarines ideally operate at least 100 metres below the sonic layer depth. World War II submarines operated at a total depth of rarely more than 100 metres. With the development of nuclear submarines, their new independence from the surface for an air supply for their diesel engines meant that they could focus on hidden operation at depth, rather than operating largely as surface-cruising submersibles. The increased power of a nuclear reactor allowed their hulls to become larger and faster. Developments in sonar made them able to hunt effectively at depth, rather than relying on visual observations from periscope depth. All these factors drove a need for improved steels for stronger pressure hulls.

The strength of a submarine hull is constrained not merely by yield strength, but also fatigue strength. As well as the obvious need for a hull strong enough not to be crushed at depth, the cyclical effect of hundreds of dives over a submarine's lifetime (Note: USS Tullibee, 730 dives during her time in commission. USS Torsk, a diesel training submarine, made 11,884 dives.) mean that fatigue strength is also important. To provide sufficient resistance to fatigue, the hull must be designed so that the steel always operates below its endurance limit; that is, the stress due to pressure at depth remains less than the fatigue strength for an indefinite number of cycles.

US submarines post-WWII, both conventional and nuclear, had improved designs compared to the earlier fleet submarines. Their steel was also improved and was the equivalent of "HY-42". Boats of this construction included USS Nautilus, and the Skate-class, which were the first nuclear submarines, with the then-conventional hull shape. The later Skipjack class, although of the new Albacore 'teardrop' hull form, also used these earlier steels. Such boats had normal operating depths of some 700 feet (210 m), and a crush depth of 1,100 feet (340 m). Bureau of Ships conducted a research program for developing higher strength steel for ship and submarine construction. During testing, a variant of special treatment steel (STS), a homogeneous Krupp-type armor steel developed by Carnegie Steel in 1910 and commonly used for deck protection, with modifications in carbon and nickel and the addition of molybdenum, became known as "Low-carbon STS"; this steel showed the best combination of all the desirable properties. Low-carbon STS became the forerunner of HY-80, and was first used in 1953 for the construction of USS Albacore, a small diesel research submarine. Albacore tested its eponymous teardrop hull shape, which would form a pattern for the following US nuclear classes.

Although the operating depths of submarines are highly secret, their crush depth limits can be calculated approximately, solely from knowledge of the steel strength. With the stronger HY-80 steel, this depth increased to 1,800 feet (550 m) and with HY-100 a depth of 2,250 feet (690 m).

The first production submarines to use HY-80 steel were the Permit class. These reportedly had a normal operating depth of 1,300 feet, roughly two-thirds the crush depth limit imposed by the steel. USS Thresher, the lead boat of this class, was lost in an accident in 1963. At the time, this unexplained accident raised much controversy about its cause and the new HY-80 steel used was looked at suspiciously, especially for theories about weld cracking having been the cause of the loss.

HY-100 steel was introduced for the deeper diving Seawolf class, although two of the preceding HY-80 Los Angeles class, USS Albany (1987) and USS Topeka (1988), had trialled HY-100 construction. USS Seawolf is officially claimed to have a normal operating depth of "greater than 800 feet". Based on the reported operating depth of Thresher, it may be assumed that the normal operating depth of Seawolf is roughly double the official figure.

HY-100 too was dogged by problems of weld cracking. Seawolf's construction suffered setbacks in 1991 and an estimated 15% or two years' work on hull construction had to be abandoned. Although later solved, these extra costs (and the post-Soviet peace dividend) were a factor in reducing the planned 29 Seawolf submarines to just three constructed.

== Metallurgy ==
The final microstructure of the weldment will be directly related to the composition of the material and the thermal cycle(s) it has endured, which will vary across the base material, Heat Affected Zone (HAZ) and Fusion Zone (FZ). The microstructure of the material will directly correlate to the mechanical properties, weldability and service life/performance of the material/weldment. Alloying elements, weld procedures and weldment design all need to be coordinated and considered when looking to use HY-80 steel.

HY-80 and HY-100 are covered in the following US military specifications:

- MIL S-16216
- MIL S-21952

=== Alloy content ===
The alloy content will vary slightly according to the thickness of the plate material. Thicker plate will be more restrictive in its compositional alloy ranges due to the added weldability challenges created by enhanced stress concentrations in connective joints.

==== Importance of key alloying elements ====
Carbon – Controls the peak hardness of the material and is an austenite stabiliser, which is necessary for martensite formation. HY-80 is prone to the formation of martensite and martensite's peak hardness is dependent on its carbon content. HY-80 is an FCC material that allows carbon to more readily diffuse than in FCC materials such as austenitic stainless steel.

Nickel – Adds to toughness and ductility to the HY-80 and is also an austenite stabilizer.

Manganese – Cleans impurities in steels (most commonly used to tie up sulfur) and also forms oxides that are necessary for the nucleation of acicular ferrite. Acicular ferrite is desirable in HY-80 steels because it promotes excellent yield strength and toughness.

Silicon – Oxide former that serves to clean and provide nucleation points for acicular ferrite.

Chromium – Is a ferrite stabilizer and can combine with carbon to form chromium carbides for increased strength of the material.

==== Trace elements ====
Antimony, tin and arsenic are potentially dangerous elements to have in the compositional makeup due to their ability to form eutectics and suppress local melting temperatures. This is an increasing problem with the increased used of scrap in the making of steel in the electric arc furnace (EAF) process.

The precise range of permitted alloy content varies slightly according to the thickness of the sheet. The figures here are for thicker sheets, 3 inches (76 mm) and over, which are the more restrictive compositions.

	HY-80	HY-100
Alloying elements
Carbon	0.13–0.18%	0.14–0.20%
Manganese	0.10–0.40%	
Phosphorus	0.015% max	
Sulfur	0.008% max	
Silicon	0.15–0.38%	
Nickel	3.00–3.50%	
Chromium	1.50–1.90%	
Molybdenum	0.50–0.65%	
Residual elements (Note: Elements not added deliberately)
Vanadium	0.03% max	
Titanium	0.02% max	
Copper	0.25% max	
Trace elements
Antimony	0.025% max	
Arsenic	0.025% max	
Tin	0.030% max	

A further steel, HY-130, also includes vanadium as an alloying element. Welding of HY-130 is considered to be more restricted, as it is difficult to obtain filler materials that can provide comparable performance.

=== Characteristics ===
Physical Properties of HY-80, HY-100, and HY-130 Steel
	HY-80 steel	HY-100 steel	HY-130 steel
Tensile yield strength	80 ksi (550 MPa)	100 ksi (690 MPa)	130 ksi (900 MPa)
Hardness (Rockwell)	C-21	C-25	C-30
Elastic Properties
Elastic modulus $E$ (GPa)	207		
Poisson's Ratio $\nu$	.30		
Shear modulus $G = E / 2 (1 + \nu)$ (GPa)	79		
Bulk modulus $K = E / 3 (1 - 2\nu)$ (GPa)	172		
Thermal Properties
Density $\rho$ (kg/m^{3})	7746	7748	7885
Conductivity $k$ (W/mK)	34		27
Specific heat $c_p$ (J/kgK)	502		489
Diffusivity $k / \rho c_p$ (m^{2}/s)	.000009		.000007
Coefficient of expansion (vol.) $\alpha$ (K^{−1})	.000011	.000014	.000013
Melting point $T_{melt}$ (K)	1793		

== Weldability ==
HIC or HAC - hydrogen induced or hydrogen assisted cracking is a real weldability concern that must be addressed in HY-80 steels. Hydrogen embrittlement is a high risk under all conditions for HY-80 and falls into zone 3 for the AWS method. HAC/HIC can occur in either the Fusion Zone or the Heat Affected Zone. As mentioned previously the HAZ and FZ are both susceptible to the formation of martensite and thus are at risk for HAC/HIC. The Fusion Zone HIC/HAC can be addressed with the use of a proper filler metal, while the HAZ HIC/HAC must be addressed with preheat and weld procedures. Low hydrogen practice is always recommended when welding on HY-80 steels.

It is not possible to autogenous weld HY-80 due to the formation of untempered martensite. Use of filler metals is required to introduce alloying materials that serve to form oxides that promote the nucleation of acicular ferrite. The HAZ is still a concern that must be addressed with proper preheat and weld procedures to control the cooling rates. Slow cooling rates can be as detrimental as rapid cooling rates in the HAZ. Rapid cooling will form untempered martensite; however, very slow cooling rates caused by high preheat or a combination of preheat and high heat input from the weld procedures can create a very brittle martensite due to high carbon concentrations that form in the HAZ.

Preheating should be considered to allow diffusible hydrogen to diffuse and to reduce the cooling temperature gradient. The slower cooling rate will reduce the likelihood of martensite formation. If the preheat temperature is not high enough the cooling temperature gradient will be too steep and it will create brittle welds. Multipass welds require a minimum and maximum inter-pass temperature with the purpose to maintain yield strength and to prevent cracking. The preheat and inter-pass temperatures will depend on the thickness of the material.

=== Welding filler metal ===
Generally, HY-80 is welded with an AWS ER100S-1 welding wire. The ER100S-1 has a lower Carbon and Nickel content to assist in the dilutive effect during welding discussed previously. An important function of the filler metal is to nucleate acicular ferrite. Acicular ferrite is formed with the presence of oxides and the composition of the filler metal can increase the formation of these critical nucleation sites.

=== Welding processes ===
The selection of the welding process can have a significant impact on the areas affected by welding. The heat input can alter the microstructure in HAZ and the fusion zone alike and weld metal/HAZ toughness is a key consideration/requirement for HY-80 weldments. It is important to consider the totality of the weldment when selecting a process because thick plate generally requires multi-pass welds and additional passes can alter previously deposited weld metal. Different methods (SMAW, GMAW, SAW) can have a significant influence of the fracture toughness of the material. SAW as an example can temper previous weld passes due to its generally high heat input characteristics. The detailed hardness profiles of HY-80 weldments varies with different processes (gradients vary dramatically), but the peak values for hardness remains constant among the different processes. This holds true for both HAZ and weld metal.

=== Distortion and stress ===
Given the compositional differences between the base material and the composite zone of the weld it is reasonable to expect that there will be potential Distortion due to non-uniform expansion and contraction. This mechanical effect can cause residual stresses that can lead to a variety of failures immediately after the weld or in service failures when put under load. In HY-80 steels the level of distortion is proportional to the level of weld heat input, the higher the heat input the higher levels of distortion. HY-80 has been found to have less in-plane weld shrinkage and less out-of-plane distortion than the common ABS Grade DH-36.

== Testing ==
The testing of HY-80 steel can be divided into the categories of destructive and non-destructive evaluation. A variety of destructive tests from Charpy V-notch to explosion bulge can be performed. Destructive testing is not practical for inspecting completed weldments prior to being placed in service; therefore, NDE is preferred for this case. Non-destructive evaluation includes many techniques or methods: visual inspection, X-ray, ultrasonic inspection, magnetic particle inspection and eddy-current inspection.

The ultimate tensile strength of these steels is considered secondary to their yield strength. Where this is required to meet a particular value, it is specified for each order.

Notch toughness is a measure of tear resistance, a steel's ability to resist further tearing from a pre-existing notch. It is usually evaluated as the tear-yield ratio, the ratio of tear resistance to yield strength.

Wrought HY-80 steels are produced by, amongst others, ArcelorMittal in the USA, forgings and castings in HY-80 by Sheffield Forgemasters and castings in HY80 by Goodwin Steel Castings in the UK.
