= USS Albany (SSN-753) =

Los Angeles-class nuclear-powered attack submarine of the US Navy

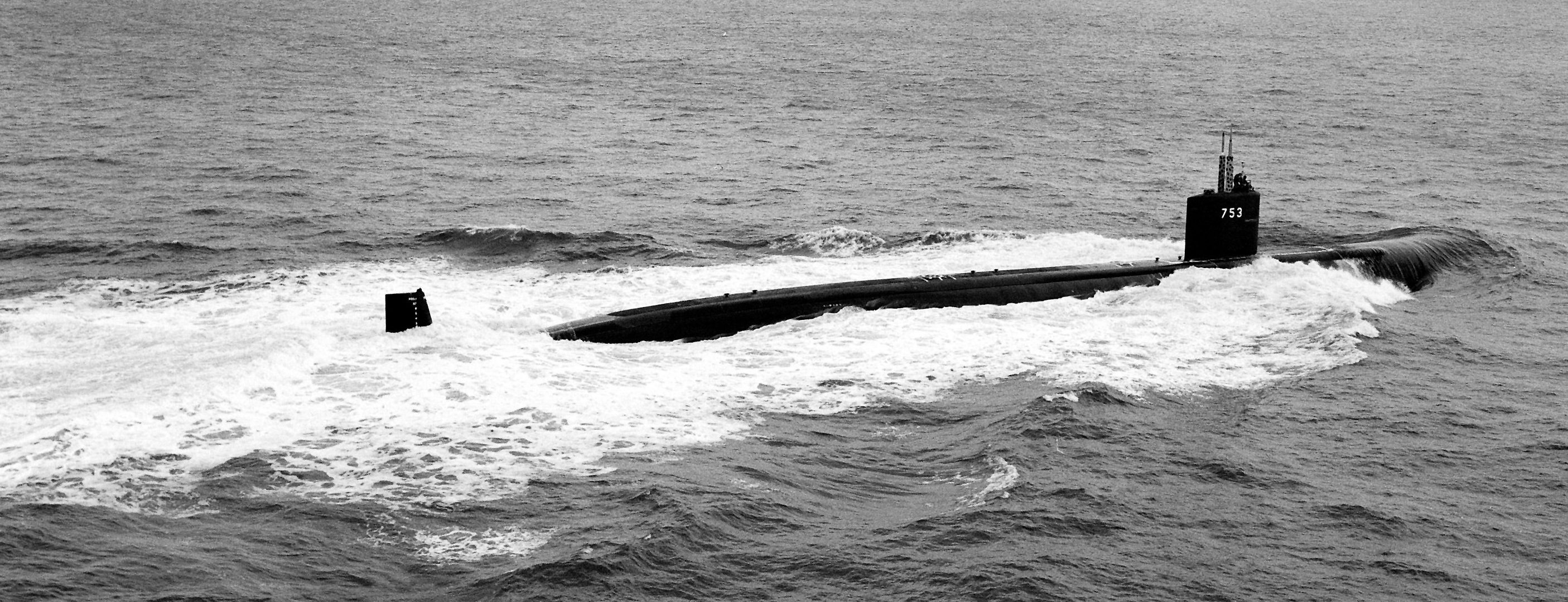
- USS Albany (SSN-753)

History

United States
- Namesake: The City of Albany, New York
- Awarded: 29 November 1983
- Builder: Newport News Shipbuilding and Drydock Company
- Laid down: 22 April 1985
- Launched: 13 June 1987
- Sponsored by: Mrs. Nancy M. Kissinger
- Commissioned: 7 April 1990
- Home port: Groton, Connecticut
- Motto: Still Making History
- Status: Ship in active service
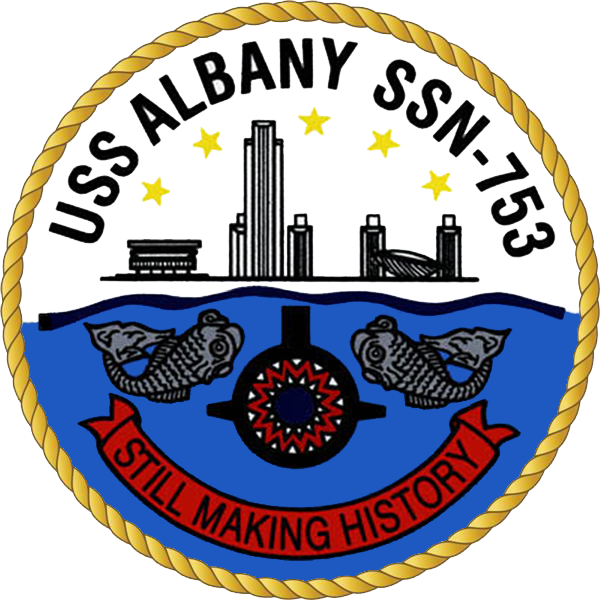
- Badge

General characteristics
- Class & type: Los Angeles-class submarine
- Displacement: 5,746 long tons (5,838 t) light; 6,148 long tons (6,247 t) full; 402 long tons (408 t) dead
- Length: 110.3 m (361 ft 11 in)
- Beam: 10 m (32 ft 10 in)
- Draft: 9.4 m (30 ft 10 in)
- Propulsion: 1 × S6G PWR nuclear reactor with D2W core (165 MW), HEU 93.5%; 2 × steam turbines (33,500) shp; 1 × shaft; 1 × secondary propulsion motor 325 hp (242 kW)
- Complement: 15 officers, 98 men
- Armament: 4 21 in (533 mm) bow tubes, 10 Mk48 ADCAP torpedo reloads, Tomahawk land attack missile block 3 SLCM range 1,700 nmi (3,148 km; 1,956 mi), Harpoon anti–surface ship missile range 70 nmi (130 km; 81 mi), mine laying Mk67 mobile mine & Mk60 captor mines

USS Albany (SSN-753) is a Los Angeles-class submarine, the fifth ship of the United States Navy to be named for Albany, New York. The contract to build her was awarded to Newport News Shipbuilding and Dry Dock Company in Newport News, Virginia, on 29 November 1983 and her keel was laid down on 22 April 1985. She was launched on 13 June 1987 sponsored by Nancy M. Kissinger, wife of Henry Kissinger, and was commissioned on 7 April 1990 with Commander Darl R. Anderson in command.

Albany was the last US submarine built via the traditional "keel up" ship construction method. Thus, it was the last submarine to "launch" down the shipway.

Albany and USS Topeka, differ from other members of the Los Angeles class as their pressure hulls were partially manufactured using stronger HY-100 steel rather than the HY-80 steel used in the manufacturing of all other Los Angeles-class submarines. This was done to test construction methods using this steel, which would later be employed in the assembly of the new Seawolf-class submarines.

On 30 July 2004 Albany returned to Norfolk, Virginia, after a six-month deployment that began in the Persian Gulf and Gulf of Oman, then proceeded to the Mediterranean Sea for a NATO exercise, Operation "MEDSHARK/Majestic Eagle."

On 14 May 2022 Albany returned to Norfolk after a six-month deployment.
