= Special treatment steel =

US warship armor material

Special treatment steel (STS), also known as protective deck plate, was a type of warship armor developed by Carnegie Steel around 1910.

== History ==
STS is a homogeneous Krupp-type steel developed around 1910. The development of such homogeneous steel resulted from testing which showed that face-hardened armor was less effective against high-obliquity glancing impacts. Around 1910, Carnegie Steel developed a new nickel-chrome-vanadium alloy-steel that offered improved protection over the prior nickel steel armor, though vanadium was no longer used after 1914. This alloy-steel became known as "Special Treatment Steel (STS)"; it became the U.S. Navy Bureau of Construction and Repair (later Bureau of Ships) standard form of high-percentage nickel steel used on all portions of warships needing homogeneous direct impact protection armor.

STS was used as homogeneous armor that was less than 4 in (102 mm) thick; homogeneous armor for gun mounts and conning towers, where the thicknesses were considerably greater, used Bureau of Ordnance Class "B" armor which had similar protective properties as STS. Somewhat more ductile than the average for any similar armor, even Krupp's post-World War I "Wotan weich" armor, STS could be used as structural steel, whereas traditional armor plate was entirely deadweight. STS was expensive, but the United States could afford to use it, lavishly, and did so on virtually every class of warship constructed from 1930 through the World War II era, in thicknesses ranging from bulkheads to splinter protection to armored decks to lower armor belts.

After World War II, the Bureau of Ships conducted a research program for developing a high strength steel for ship and submarine construction. During testing, a variant of STS with modifications in carbon and nickel content and the addition of molybdenum, known as "Low-carbon STS", showed the best combination of all the desirable properties. Low-carbon STS was used in the experimental submarine USS Albacore (AGSS-569) and the aircraft carrier USS Forrestal (CV-59). Low-carbon STS became the forerunner of HY-80, which eventually became the standard steel for submarine construction during the Cold War.

== Metallurgy ==
=== Alloy content ===
| | Alloying elements |
| Carbon | 0.35–0.4% |
| Nickel | 3.00–3.50% |
| Chromium | 1.75–2.00% |

Unlike some similar steels, such as Krupp Ww, STS did not use molybdenum.

=== Characteristics ===
| Tensile yield strength | 75-85 ksi (520-590 MPa) |
| Tensile ultimate strength | 110–125 ksi (760–860 MPa) |
| Yield/Ultimate strength | 0.68 |
| Percent elongation | 25 |
| Percent reduction in area | 68 |
| Brinell hardness | 200-240 |

== Sources ==
- DiGiulian, Tony. "Okun Resource - Table of Metallurgical Properties of Naval Armor and Construction Materials - NavWeaps". www.navweaps.com.
- Gene Slover. "Armour chapter XII". Gene Slover's US Navy Pages - Naval Ordnance and Gunnery.
