= Submarine depth ratings =

Measures of a submarine's ability to operate underwater

Depth ratings are primary design parameters and measures of a submarine's ability to operate underwater. The depths to which submarines can dive are limited by the strengths of their hulls.

== Ratings ==
The hull of a submarine must be able to withstand the forces created by the outside water pressure being greater than the inside air pressure. The outside water pressure increases with depth and so the stresses on the hull also increase with depth. Each 10 metres (33 ft) of depth puts another atmosphere (1 bar, 14.7 psi, 101 kPa) of pressure on the hull, so at 300 metres (1,000 ft), the hull is withstanding thirty standard atmospheres (30 bar; 440 psi; 3,000 kPa) of water pressure.

=== Test depth ===
This is the maximum depth at which a submarine is permitted to operate under normal peacetime circumstances, and is tested during sea trials. The test depth is set at two-thirds (0.66) of the design depth for United States Navy submarines, while the Royal Navy sets test depth at 4/7 (0.57) the design depth, and the German Navy sets it at exactly one-half (0.50) of design depth.

=== Operating depth ===
Also known as the maximum operating depth (or the never-exceed depth), this is the maximum depth at which a submarine is allowed to operate under any (e.g., battle) conditions.

=== Design depth ===
The nominal depth listed in the submarine's specifications. From it the designers calculate the thickness of the hull metal, the boat's displacement, and many other related factors.

=== Crush depth ===
Sometimes referred to as the "collapse depth" in the United States, this is the submerged depth at which the submarine implodes due to water pressure. Technically speaking, the crush depth should be the same as the design depth, but in practice is usually somewhat deeper. This is the result of compounding safety margins throughout the production chain, where at each point an effort is made to at least slightly exceed the required specifications to account for imperceptible material defects or variations in machining tolerances.

A submarine, by definition, cannot exceed crush depth without being crushed. However, when a prediction is made as to what a submarine's crush depth might be, that prediction may subsequently be mistaken for the actual crush depth of the submarine. Such misunderstandings, compounded by errors in translation and general confusion as to what the various depth ratings mean, have resulted in multiple erroneous accounts of submarines not being crushed at their crush depth.

Notably, several World War II submarines reported that, due to flooding or mechanical failure, they had gone below crush depth, before successfully resurfacing after having the failure repaired or the water pumped out. In these cases, the "crush depth" is always either a mistranslated official "safe" or design depth (i.e., the test depth, or the maximum operating depth) or a prior (incorrect) estimate of what the crush depth might be.

== See also ==
- HY-80 steel
- USS Thresher (SSN-593) – a submarine that likely imploded after reaching its crush depth
