= USS Albacore (AGSS-569) =

United States research submarine

Coordinates: 43.082375°N 70.766737°W

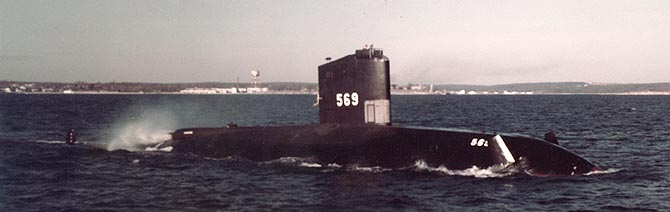
- USS Albacore off the coast of Rhode Island

History

United States
- Name: Albacore
- Namesake: Albacore
- Ordered: 24 November 1950
- Builder: Portsmouth Naval Shipyard of Kittery, Maine
- Laid down: 15 March 1952
- Launched: 1 August 1953
- Sponsored by: Mrs. J. E. Jowers, the widow of Chief Motor Machinist's Mate Arthur L. Stanton, lost with the second Albacore (SS-218)
- Commissioned: 6 December 1953
- Decommissioned: 9 December 1972
- Stricken: 1 May 1980
- Motto: Praenuntius Futuri; ("Forerunner of the Future")
- Status: Donated as a museum and memorial in Portsmouth, New Hampshire
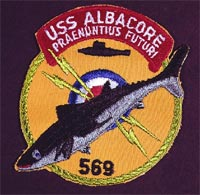
- Badge

General characteristics - Final Phase 4 Configuration
- Displacement: 1606.62 tons surface 1823.51 tons submerged
- Length: 205 ft 4.75 in (62.6047 m) Length between perpendiculars 200 ft 0 in (60.96 m)
- Beam: 27 ft 3.75 in (8.3249 m)
- Draft: Forward 19 ft 1 in (5.82 m) Aft 22 ft 3 in (6.78 m)
- Propulsion: Two 7,500 shp, counter-rotating electric motors, Two 1,000 bhp/817 kW diesel/electric generators
- Speed: Surfaced: 25 knots; Submerged: 33 knots
- Range: Varied with configuration
- Complement: 5 officers, 49 men
- Armament: None

USS Albacore (AGSS-569) is a retired, unique research submarine that pioneered the American version of the teardrop hull form, sometimes called an "Albacore hull", of modern submarines. The revolutionary design was derived from extensive hydrodynamic and wind-tunnel testing, with an emphasis on underwater speed and maneuverability. She was the third vessel of the United States Navy to be named for the albacore.

Her keel was laid down on 15 March 1952 by the Portsmouth Naval Shipyard of Kittery, Maine. She was launched on 1 August 1953, sponsored by Mrs. J. E. Jowers, the widow of Chief Motor Machinist's Mate Arthur L. Stanton, lost with the second Albacore (SS-218), and commissioned on 6 December 1953 with Lieutenant Commander Kenneth C. Gummerson in command.

The effectiveness of submarines in World War II convinced both the Soviet Navy and the United States Navy (USN) that undersea warfare would play an even more important role in coming conflicts and dictated development of superior submarines. The advent of nuclear power nourished the hope that such warships could be produced. The effort to achieve this goal involved the development of a nuclear propulsion system and the design of a streamlined submarine hull capable of optimum submerged performance.

== Development ==
Late in World War II, committees on both sides of the Iron Curtain studied postwar uses of atomic energy and recommended the development of nuclear propulsion for ships. Since nuclear power plants would operate without the oxygen supply needed by conventional machinery, and since techniques were available for oxygen generation and carbon dioxide removal, submarine designers turned their attention to vessels that could operate for long periods without surfacing. Veteran submariners visualized a new type of submarine in which surface performance characteristics would be completely subordinated to high submerged speed and agility.

In 1949, a special committee began a series of hydrodynamic studies, which led to a program within the U.S. Bureau of Ships to determine what hull form would be best for submerged operation. The David Taylor Model Basin in Maryland tested a series of designs. The best two—one with a single propeller and the other with dual screws—were then tested in a wind tunnel at Langley Air Force Base in Virginia. To hasten bureaucratic approval and to avoid interference from the various USN departments that would have overseen various aspects of a new combat ship (e.g. weapons and ordnance), Admiral Charles Momsen proposed to build an unarmed submarine as a practice target for aircraft carriers to practice antisubmarine warfare (ASW) against, and directed the Bureau of Ships to design only for speed. The single-screw version was adopted, and construction of an experimental submarine to this design was authorized on 25 November 1950.

The hull of the Albacore used HY-80 high-strength steel with a yield strength of 80,000 psi (550 MPa), although this was not initially used to increase the diving depth relative to other American submarines. HY-80 remained the standard submarine steel through the Los Angeles class. Other components were made from high-tensile steel (HTS). This ship was classified as an auxiliary submarine (AGSS-569) and named Albacore. In this instance, AGSS stands for Auxiliary General Submersible Submarine, which for the USN meant the first hull of its kind for the fleet.

== Evaluations ==
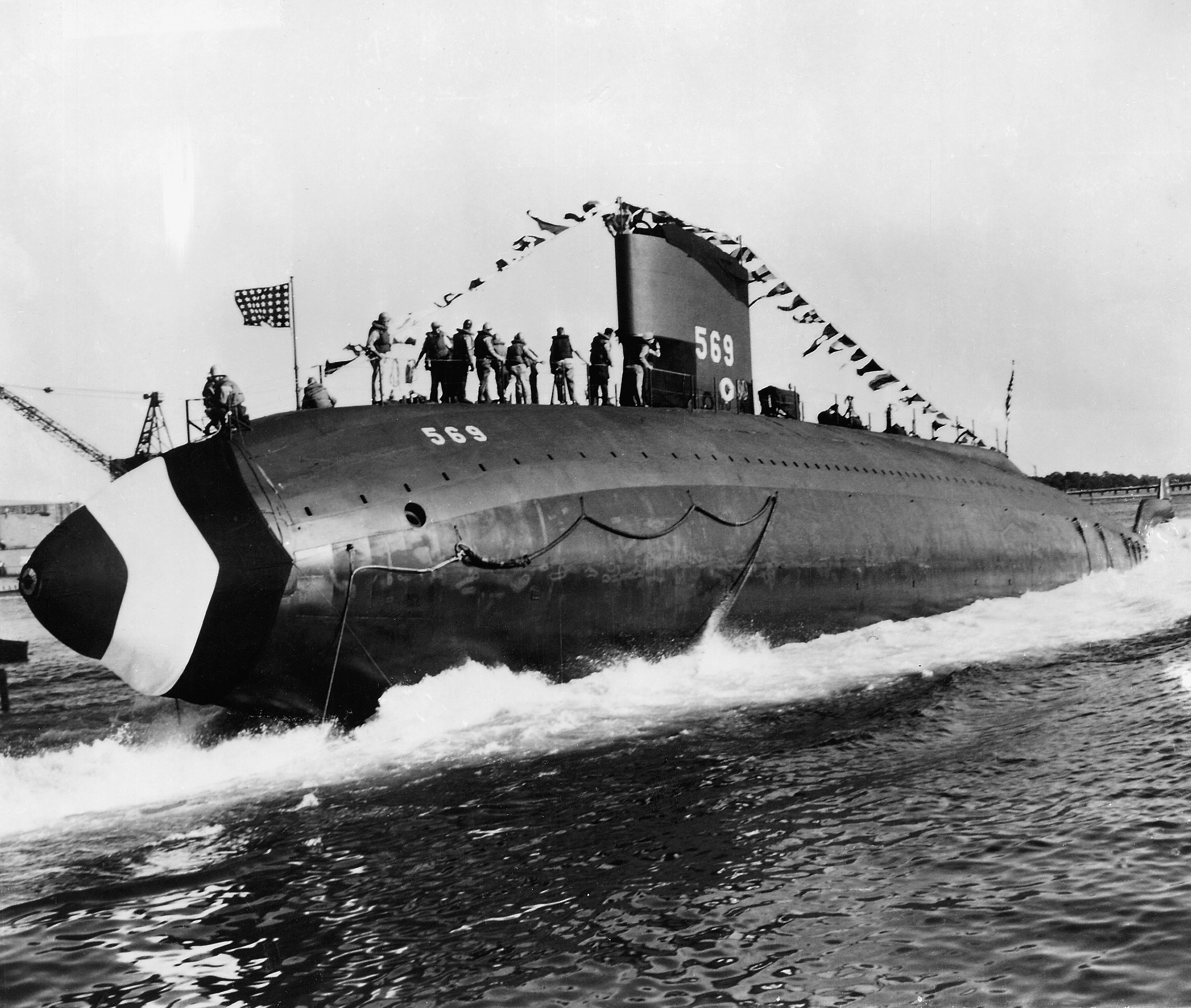
Launching at the Portsmouth Naval Shipyard, August 1953

Following preliminary acceptance trials, the new submarine departed Portsmouth on 8 April 1954 for shakedown training. She began the first cycle of a career in which she experimented extensively with a given configuration and then returned to Portsmouth for extensive modifications to evaluate different design concepts, to help the USN develop better hull configurations for future submarines. On this initial cruise, she operated out of New London, Connecticut, before sailing for Key West, Florida, to conduct operations out of that port and in Cuban waters. She returned to Portsmouth on 3 July for more than a year of trials in cooperation with the David Taylor Model Basin. Throughout these operations, she underwent repairs and modification to eliminate technical problems. During these early sea trials, Albacore was found to be able to operate at the same maximum speed as the older, modernized Guppy-type submarines with half the shaft horsepower.

The submarine departed Portsmouth on 12 October 1955 and sailed via Block Island for Key West, where she arrived on 19 October 1955 to commence ASW evaluation and to provide target services to the Operational Development Force's Surface Antisubmarine Development Detachment. On 4 November 1955, Admiral Arleigh Burke, Chief of Naval Operations, embarked on Albacore for a brief demonstration cruise. Lord Mountbatten accompanied Admiral Burke on the cruise. On 19 November 1955, Albacore sailed for a rendezvous point off the Bahamas, where she conducted special operations until 24 November 1955 and then returned to Portsmouth.

From December 1955 to March 1956, Albacore underwent stern renewal. Until this time, her propeller had been surrounded by the rudder and stern plane control surfaces. With her "new look", she resembled a blimp, with her propeller aft of all control surfaces.

Operation with her new stern configuration started in April 1956, and continued until late in the year. In May, Albacore visited New York City and participated in the television production Wide, Wide World, during which she submerged, with an underwater camera mounted on her forecastle, the first live telecast of a submarine while diving.

== More tests ==
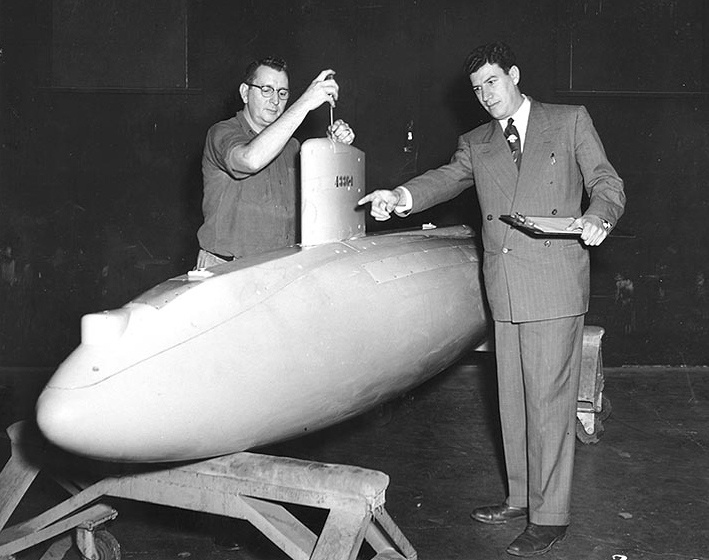
Tests using a model of the Albacore, March 1956

In November 1956, Albacore re-entered the shipyard for engine conversion. She departed New London on 11 March 1957, for operations out of San Juan, Puerto Rico, and Guantánamo Bay, Cuba. The submarine returned to Boston, Massachusetts, on 2 April 1957 and operated locally out of Boston and Portsmouth until entering the Portsmouth Naval Shipyard early in 1958 for an overhaul that lasted until June.

The ensuing tests emphasized sound reduction and included extensive evaluation of Aqua-Plas, a sound-damping elastic that had been applied to the ship's superstructure and tank interiors. In October 1958, her bow planes were removed to further reduce noise. The submarine ended the year with a fortnight's run to Halifax, Nova Scotia, and back to serve as a target ship for Canadian warships.

In 1959, a newly designed, 14-foot propeller was installed and tested. Albacore sailed south late in May, and after operating in the British West Indies for two weeks, proceeded to Key West to serve as a target for the Surface Antisubmarine Development Detachment. After returning north, she spent much of the remainder of 1959 and most of 1960 undergoing widely varied tests for the David Taylor Model Basin. One of the more unusual tests consisted of evaluating a concave bow sonar dome.

Subsequent post-1959 design went into the Barbel-class submarine design, of which three boats were produced. These three submarines looked generally the same as Albacore, although longer. Only one survives today, the USS Blueback (SS-581).

== Reconfigurations ==
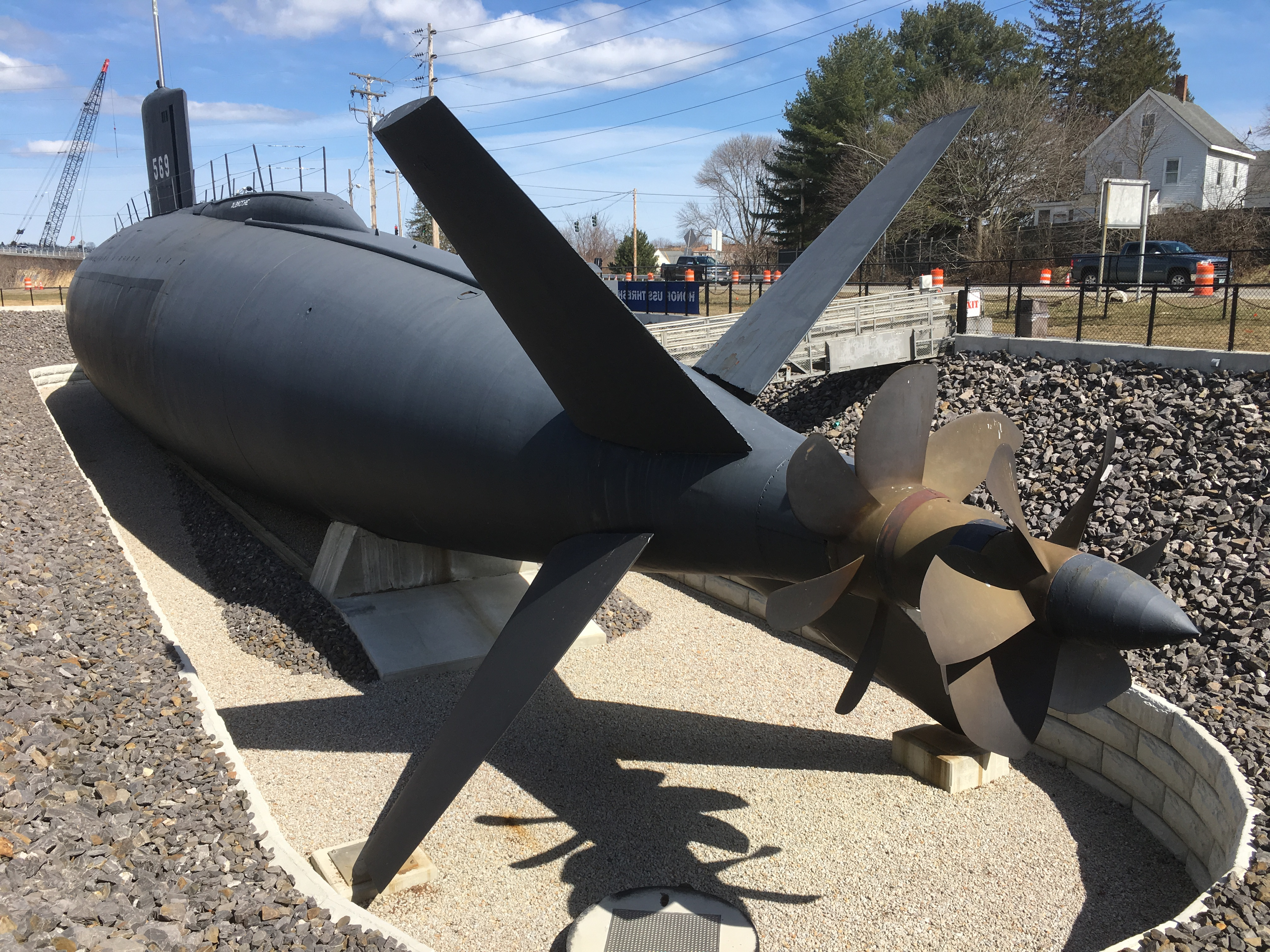
USS Albacore's final tail with contrarotating propellers

On 21 November 1960, the ship entered Portsmouth for a major overhaul and conversion in which she received a new, experimental, X-shaped tail for increased control, 10 dive brakes around her hull, a new bow that included modified forward ballast tanks, new sonar systems, and a large auxiliary rudder in the after part of her sail. Following the completion of this work in August 1961, she operated along the East Coast, learning the effect of her new configuration and equipment upon her capabilities and performance.

In 1962, the submarine received a newly developed DIMUS sonar system, and on 7 December 1962, work began on her fourth major conversion that included the installation of concentric contrarotating propellers, a high-capacity silver zinc battery, and a larger main motor. New radio equipment, BQS-4 and BQR-2 sonars, an emergency recovery system, and a new main ballast tank blow system were also added. After work was completed in March 1965, Albacore prepared for deployment to Florida waters to study the results of her changes. This was the second time that she achieved a world record speed for submarine travel, submerged. She returned to Portsmouth on 8 October 1965 and continued to evaluate her capabilities under the new configuration. On 1 August 1966, she re-entered the Portsmouth Naval Shipyard to replace the silver-zinc battery and to shorten the distance between the contrarotating propellers — work that lasted into August 1967.

Standardization and machinery tests in the Gulf of Maine during September were followed by evaluation of towed sonar arrays off Port Everglades in October and November, followed by acoustics trials in the Tongue of the Ocean, a deep channel in the central Bahamas.

On 1 January 1968, the submarine returned to Portsmouth for a modification of her propulsion system that kept her in the navy yard until 19 April. Following a month of trials in the Gulf of Maine, she headed south for evaluation of her new MONOB I and AUTEC systems and of Fly-Around-Body (FAB) Phase I equipment in the Tongue of the Ocean. She returned to Portsmouth on 24 August 1968 for AUTEC de-instrumentation and installation of FAB Phase II equipment. Following evaluation of this new gear in the Gulf of Maine, Albacore returned to Portsmouth on 30 September and entered reduced operating status pending the results of further studies on the feasibility of using her thereafter for further research.

The boat remained mostly inactive until 2 February 1970, when she began an overhaul in drydock and modifications to prepare her for Project SURPASS, researching the use of polymer mixed with fresh water to reduce drag, sponsored by the Naval Ship Research and Development Center at Carderock, Maryland. The ship left drydock on 16 April 1971, commenced sea trials on 22 July 1971, and completed them in August 1971. Early in October, she operated off Provincetown, Massachusetts, to calibrate her sonar and radar equipment.

== Decommissioning ==
- USS Albacore (Submarine)
- U.S. National Register of Historic Places
- U.S. National Historic Landmark
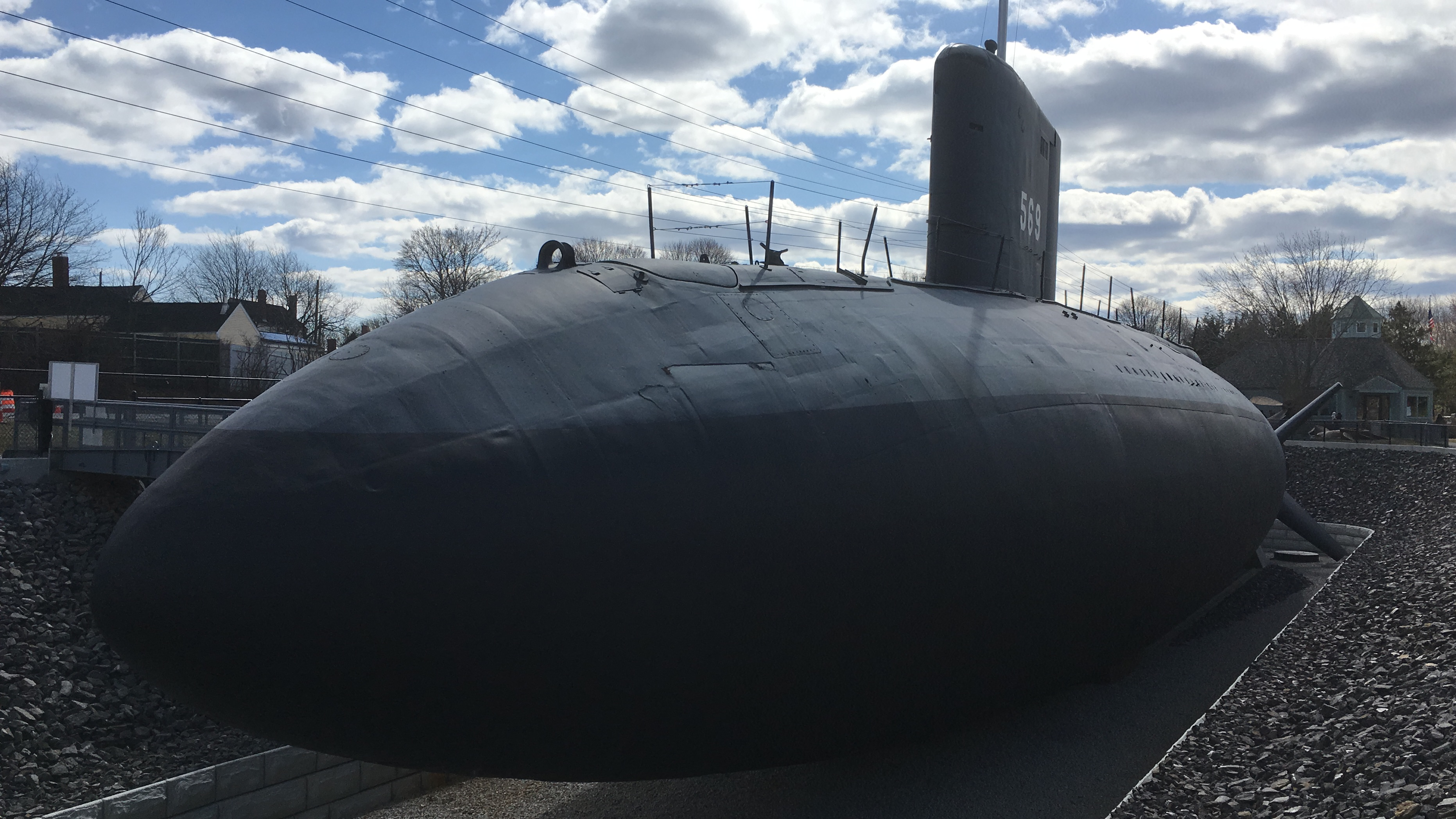
- USS Albacore on display in April 2018

- Location within New Hampshire
- Location: Portsmouth, New Hampshire
- Built: 1953
- Architect: Portsmouth Naval Shipyard
- NRHP reference No.: 89001077

Significant dates
- Added to NRHP: 11 April 1989
- Designated NHL: 11 April 1989

After frequent engine failures had caused repeated delays in her operations, her deployment in support of Project SURPASS was canceled, and preparations for her deactivation were begun. She used the General Motors EMD 16-338 lightweight, compact, high-speed "pancake" diesel engine. These had also been used on the Tang-class submarine, but were replaced on them due to problems, and their pancake engines were used as spare parts. The engines were not replaced on Albacore due to space constraints. The unreliability of the engines and lack of spares led to the decommissioning of Albacore as further cannibalized parts became unavailable.

A dockside retirement ceremony was held at Portsmouth Naval Shipyard on 1 September 1972, attended by Rear Admiral J. Edward Snyder, who delivered comments on behalf of Robert A. Frosch, Assistant Secretary of the Navy for Research and Development, referring to Albacore as "the submarine that gave its [sic] body to science." Albacore was decommissioned on 9 December 1972 and laid up at the Naval Inactive Ship Maintenance Facility in the Philadelphia Naval Shipyard. Her name was struck from the Naval Vessel Register on 1 May 1980.

== Phases ==
Operational history of the Albacore consisted of five phases (and an unrealized sixth phase):

- Phase I / project SCB 56 (December 1953 to December 1955)
  - Bow planes, control surfaces aft of propeller, 11-foot-diameter propeller, dorsal rudder
- Phase II / SCB 182 (March 1956 to November 1960)
  - Control surfaces forward of propeller, 14-foot diameter propeller, dorsal rudder removed
- Phase III / SCB 182A (August 1961 to December 1962)
  - X-stern, dive brakes, larger dorsal rudder
- Phase IV (March 1965 to February 1970)
  - Aft pressure hull enlarged and surrounding ballast tanks eliminated to accommodate two main propulsion motors, contrarotating propellers, silver-zinc battery
- Phase V (April 1971 to September 1972)
  - Bow and amidships polymer ejection manifolds and sail seawater intake scoop for Project SURPASS
- Phase VI (unrealized)
  - Hull would be lengthened 12 feet to accommodate larger, more reliable diesels

== Legacy ==
A nonprofit group, the Portsmouth Submarine Memorial Association, was formed to bring the Albacore back to Portsmouth and place her on permanent display, designed to be on dry land so the entire submarine would be visible. The Albacore was towed back to Portsmouth Naval Shipyard in April 1984 by an Army Reserve tugboat in a journey of 575 miles (925 km) that took 70 hours.

In May 1985, she was moved across Portsmouth Harbor to a permanent display site. The move was difficult, as a railway trestle had to be removed and a temporary cut, large enough to float her through, had to be made across a four-lane road. During the move, the Albacore struck bottom three times, followed by a catastrophic derailment of the temporary marine railway that had been constructed to bring her out of the water. The Albacore was left grounded in mud, short of her final resting place. Months later, a temporary cofferdam was constructed, she was refloated, and on 3 October 1985, she was successfully placed in her permanent display cradle. After significant volunteer work to prepare her for display, the Albacore opened to the public on 30 August 1986.

Albacore's service as an active experimental submersible for more than two decades steadily increased the USN's knowledge of both theoretical and applied hydrodynamics, which it used in designing faster, quieter, more maneuverable, and safer submarines. The USN's effort to build hulls capable of optimum operation while submerged was wedded to its nuclear propulsion program in the submarine Skipjack, which was laid down in the spring of 1956, and these two concepts have complemented each other in the design of all of the USN's subsequent submarines.

Albacore is located at Albacore Park, 600 Market Street, Portsmouth, New Hampshire, and is open to the public. Inside the current Visitor Center, a small exhibit space includes information regarding the USS Albacore, USS Dolphin, USS Thresher, and other maritime histories. The new portion of the Visitor Center was to be a combination of maritime history of the Piscataqua region and submarine history covering the diesel age into the nuclear revolution. This means that the exhibit space in the original museum was to focus entirely on the USS Albacore and her history. Artifacts from the USS Albacore Museum's Archive were to be on display for the first time in some instances and would serve to expand the knowledge and history of the USS Albacore. She is listed on the National Register of Historic Places and was designated a National Historic Landmark on 11 April 1989. In 2005, the United States Submarine Veterans of World War II inducted the Albacore into the Submarine Hall of Fame. In 2016, the basin area around the submarine at Albacore Park was completely reconstructed.

== Image gallery ==
=== Exterior views ===
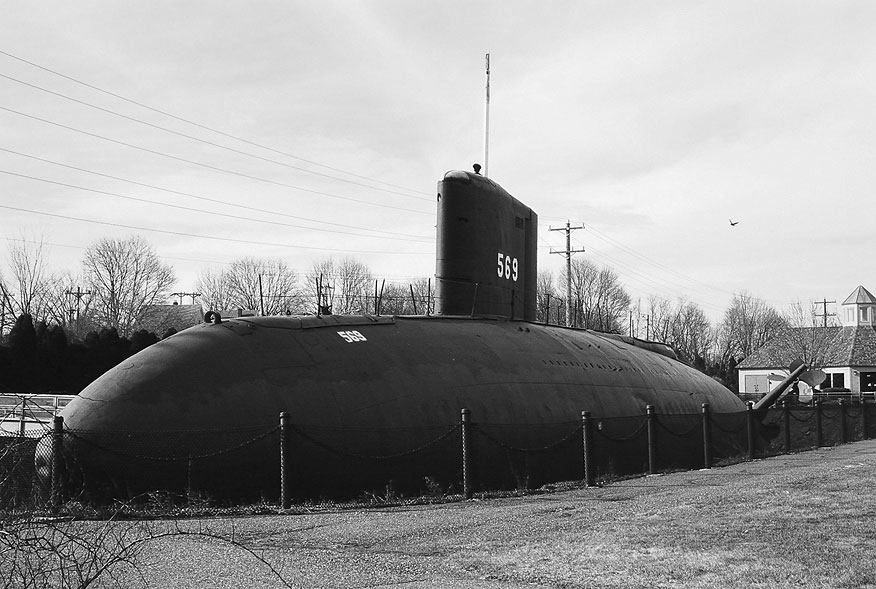
Permanent display, March 2006

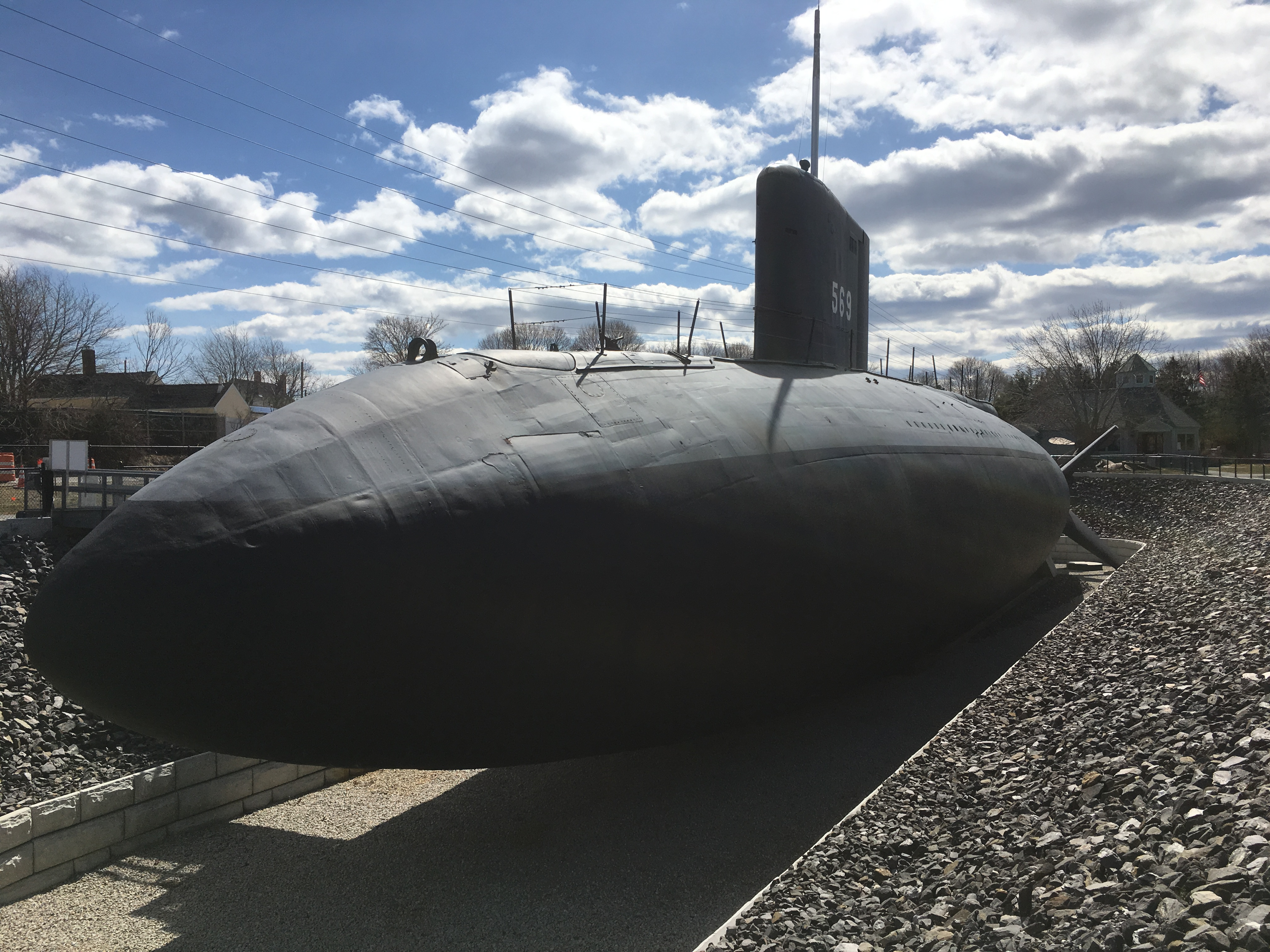
Permanent display, April 2018

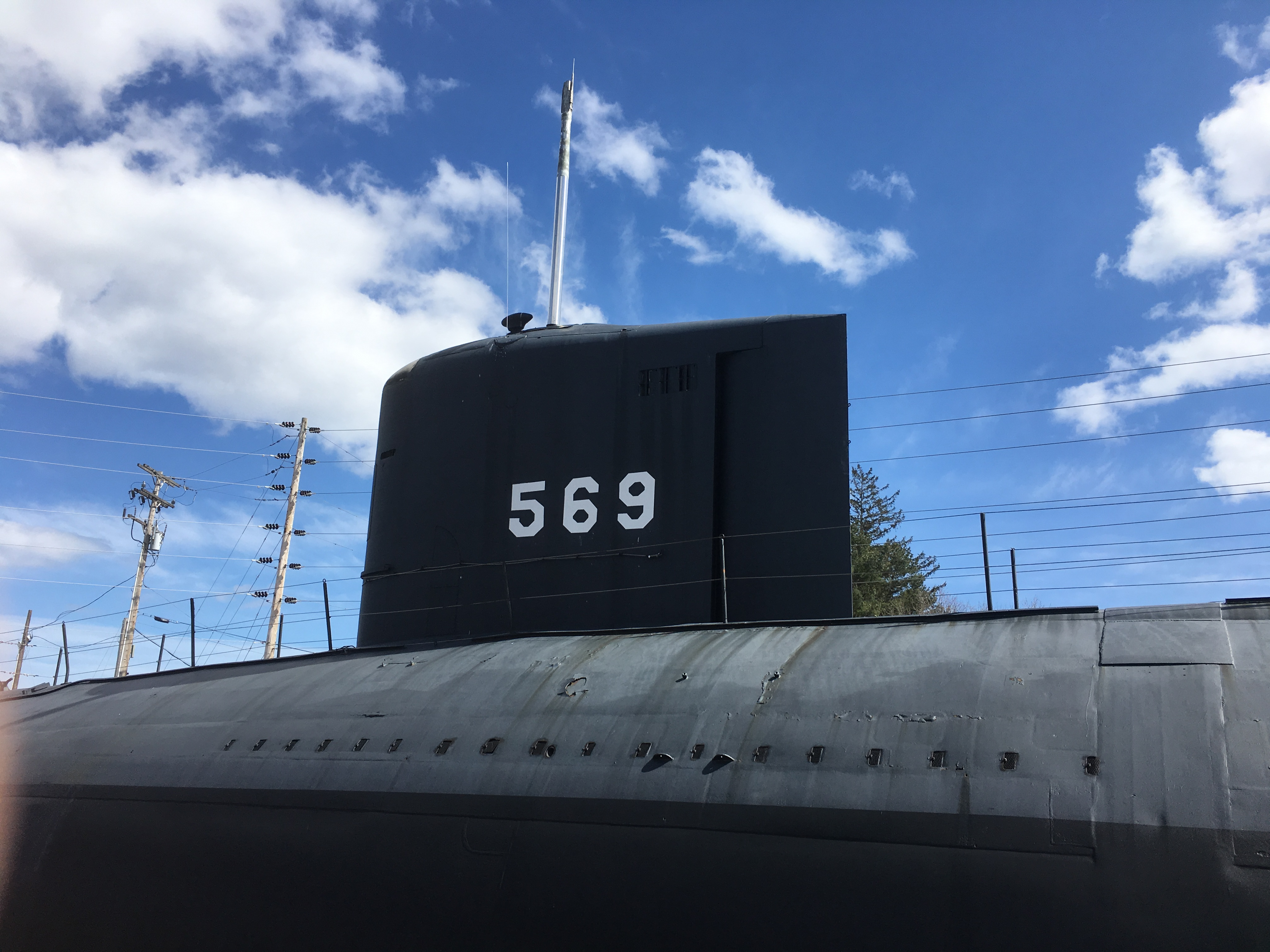
Sail detail

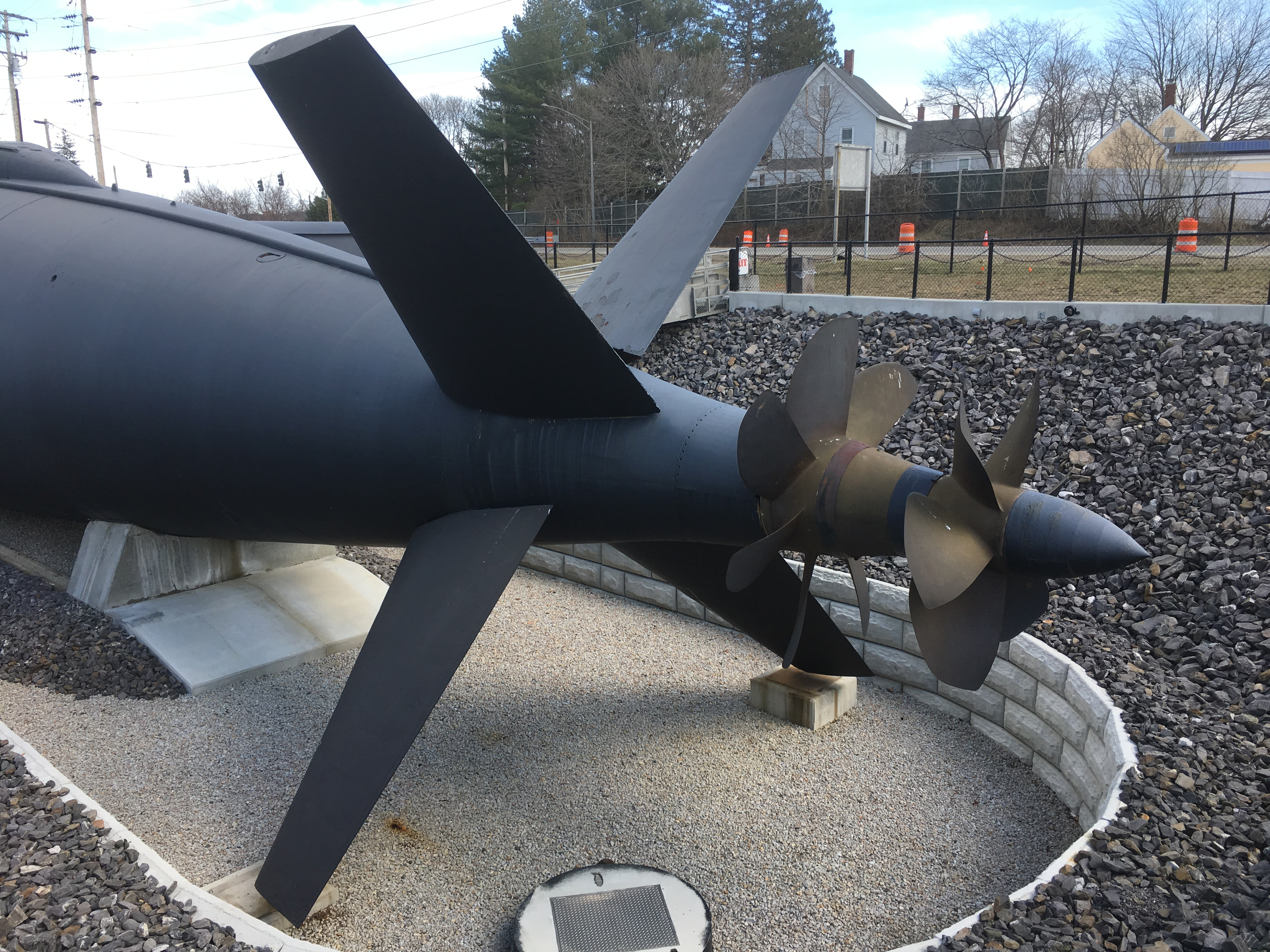
X-stern and dual propellers

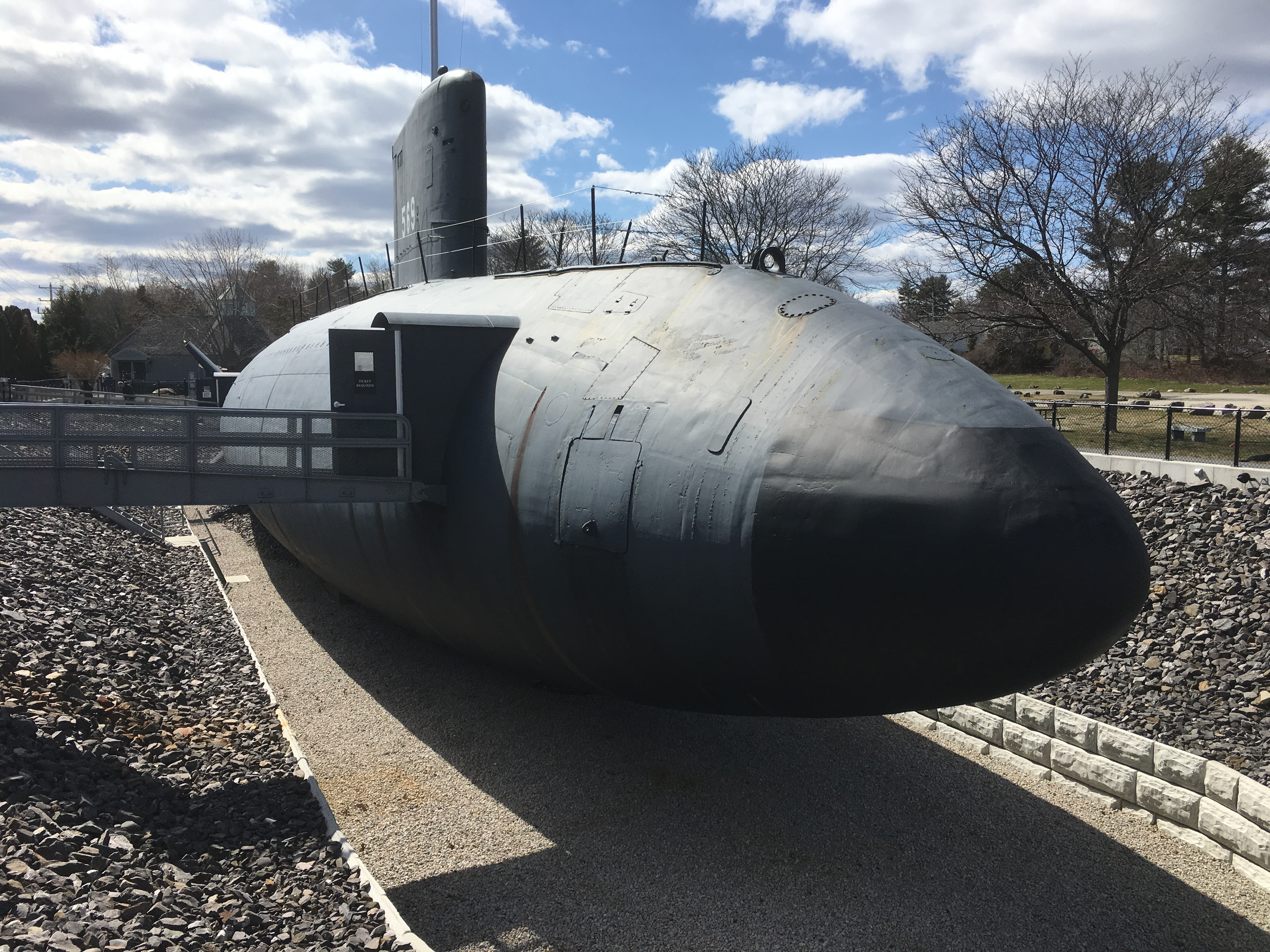
Tour entrance

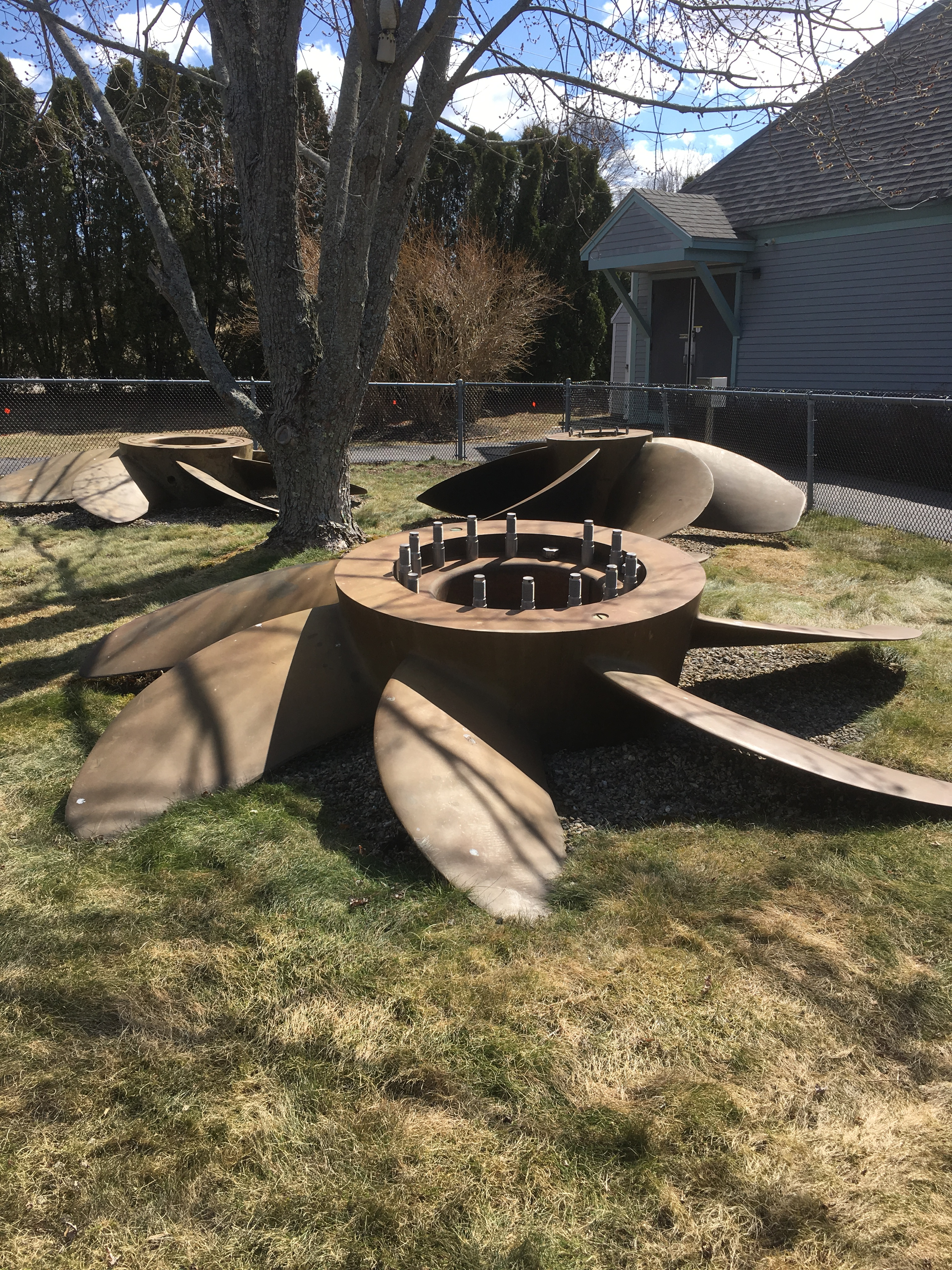
Propeller display

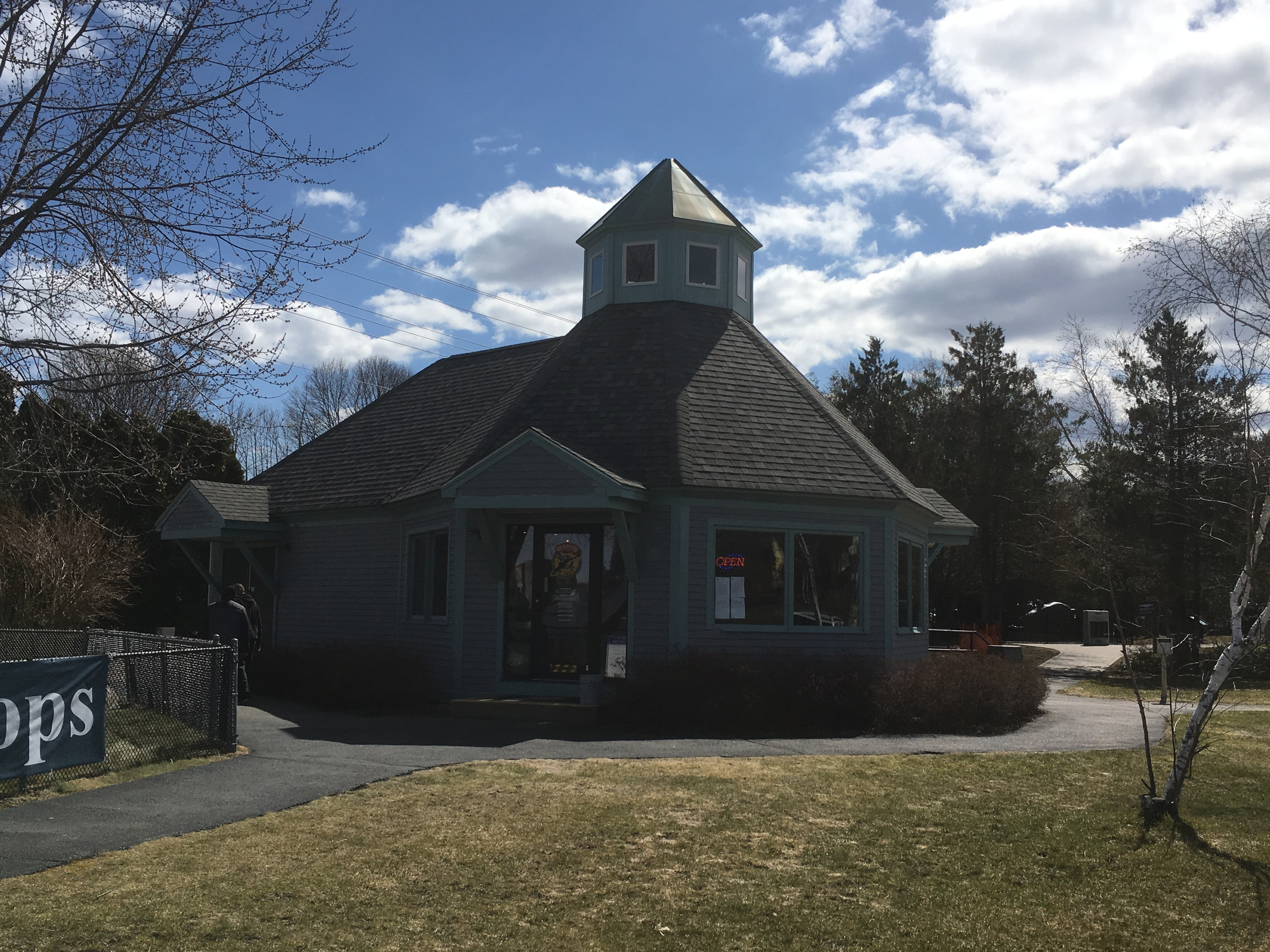
Museum and gift shop

=== Interior views ===
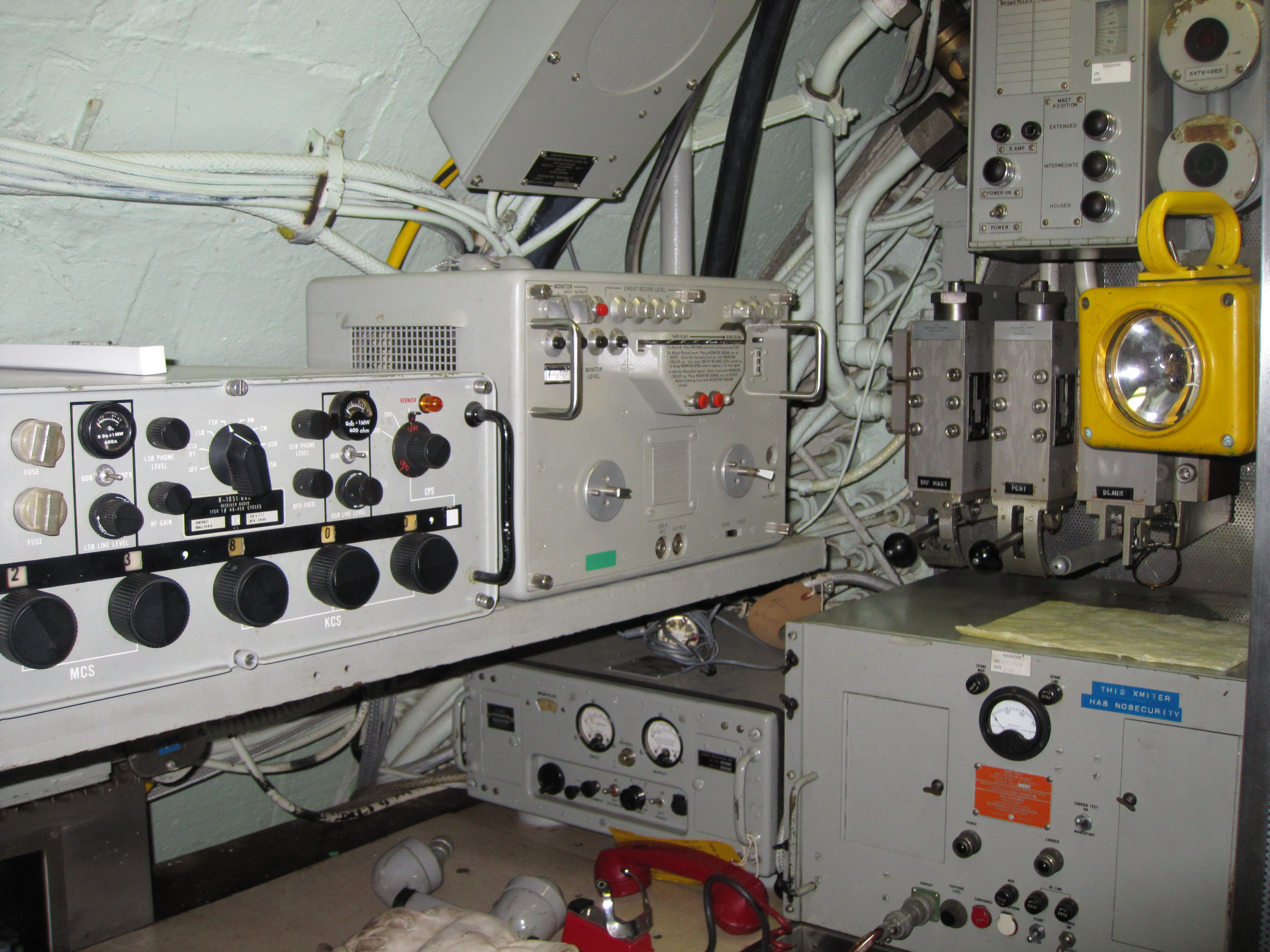
Communication station

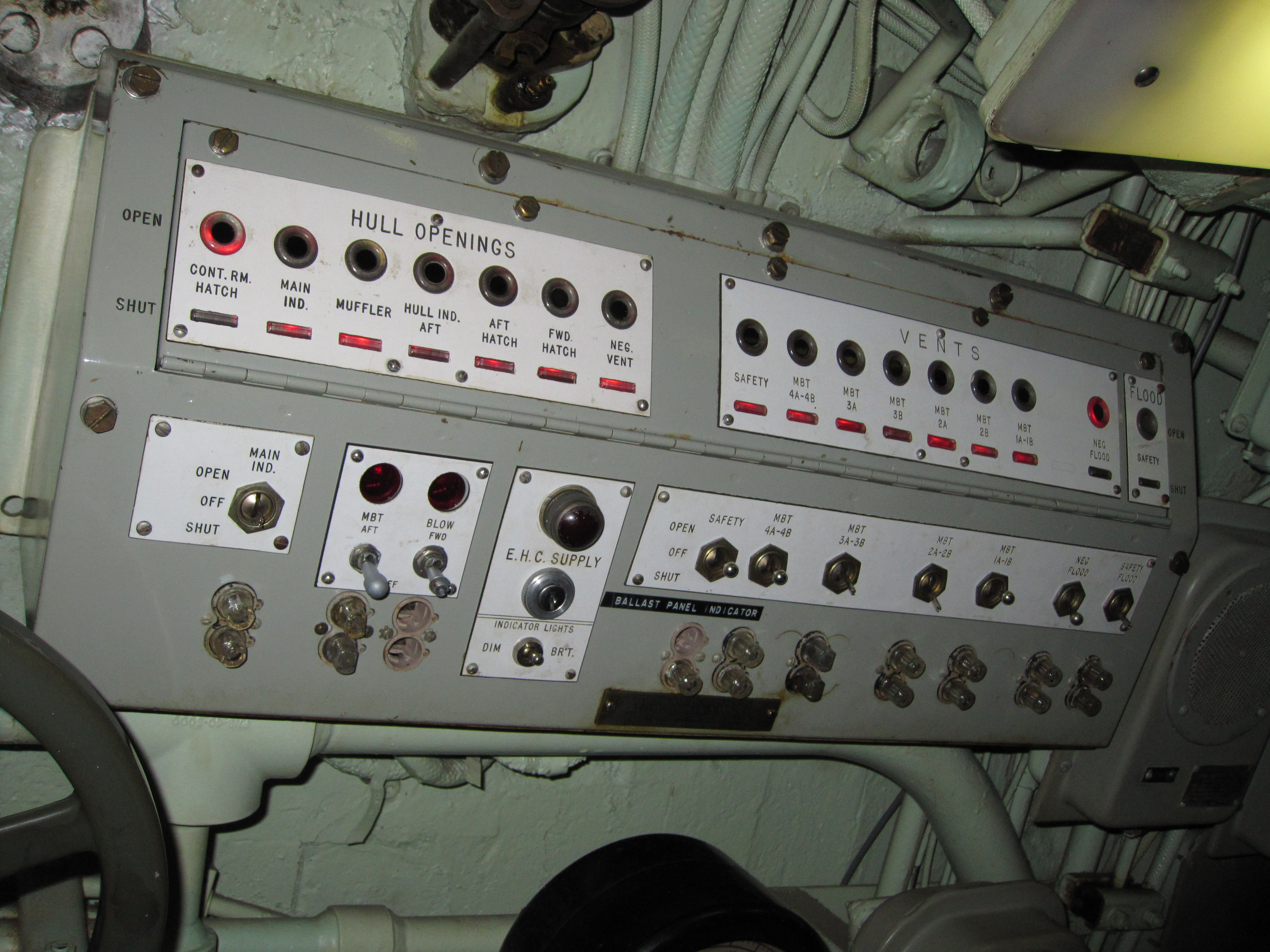
Control panel

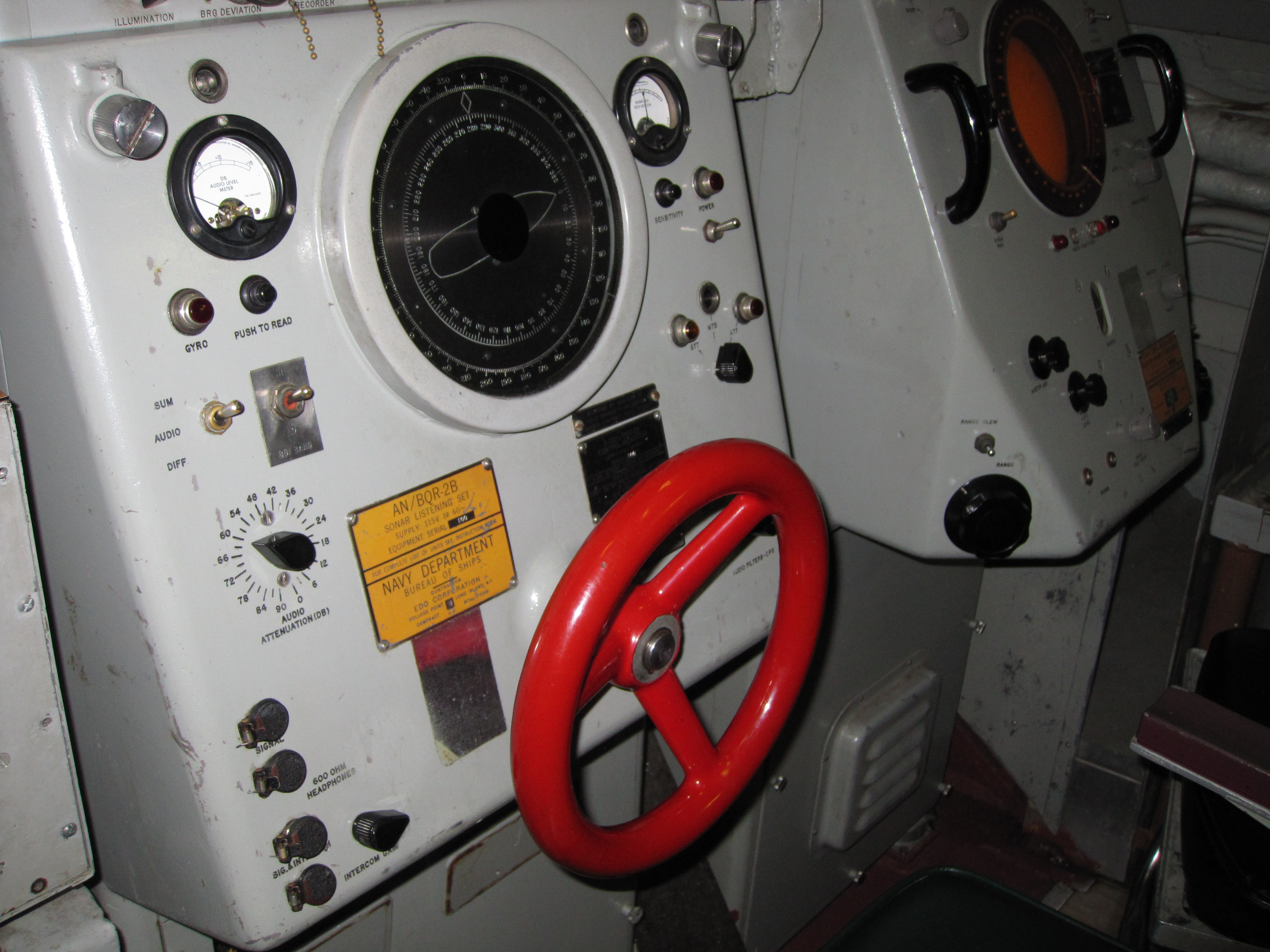
Sonar station

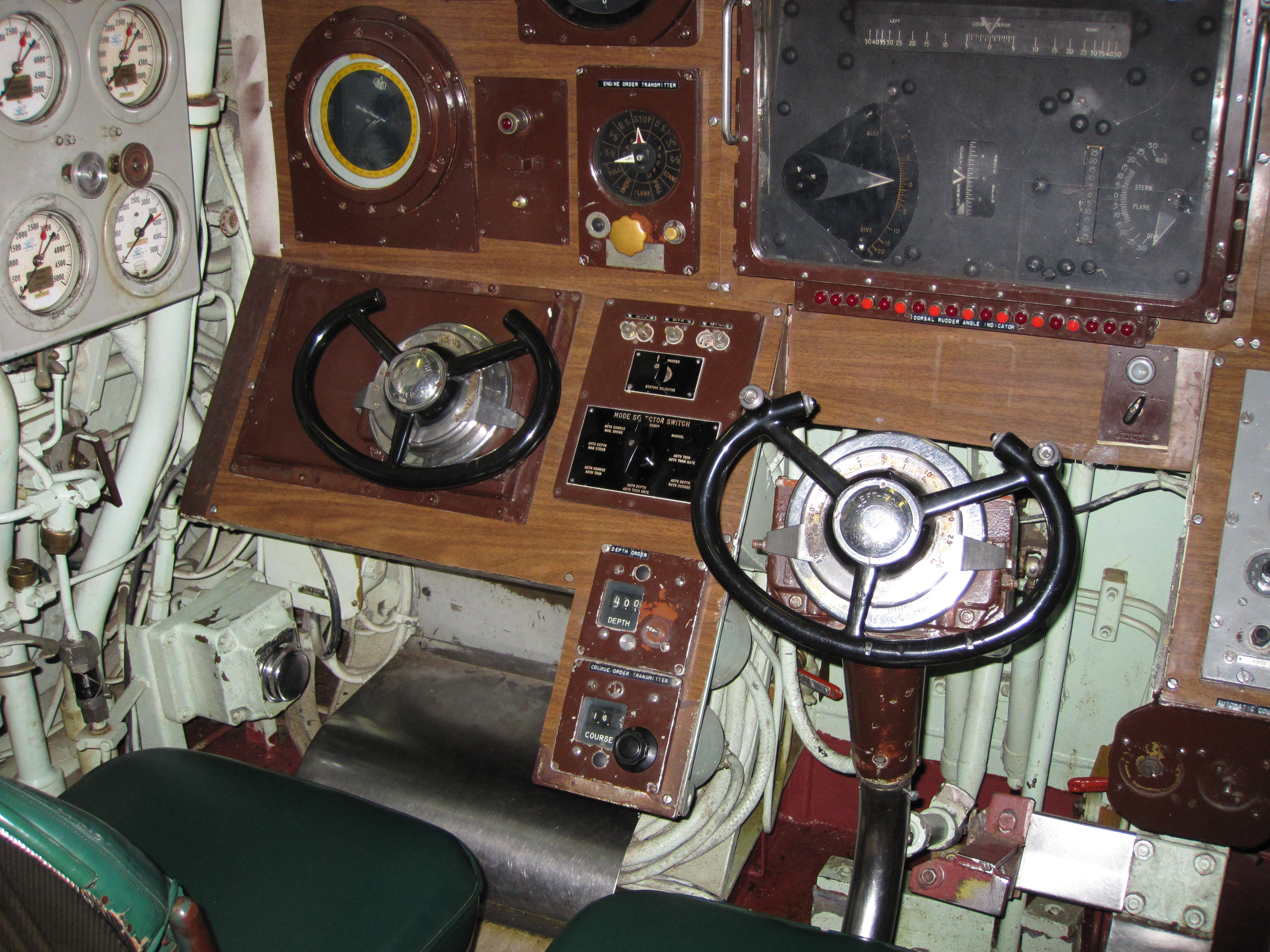
Control station

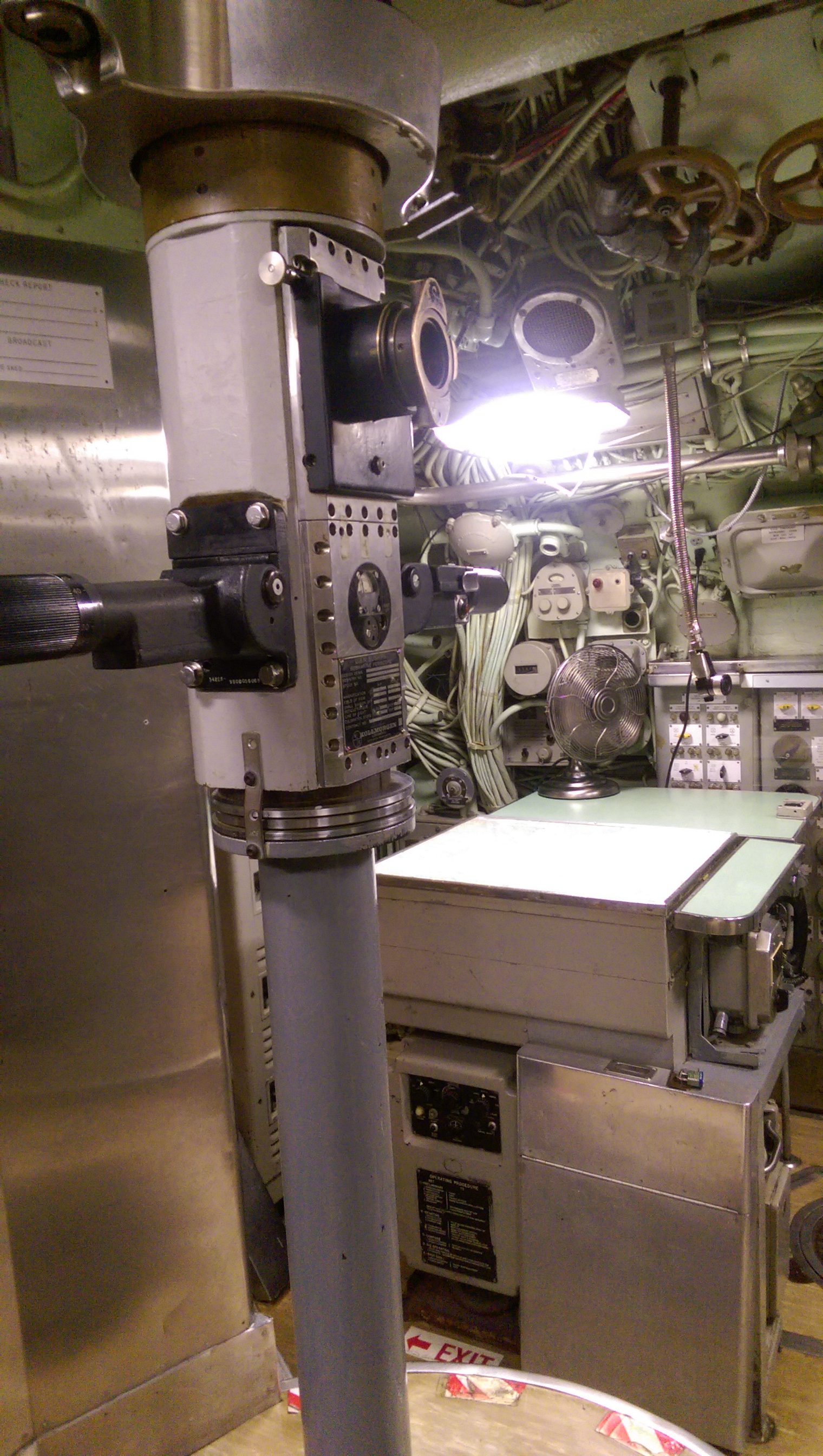
Periscope

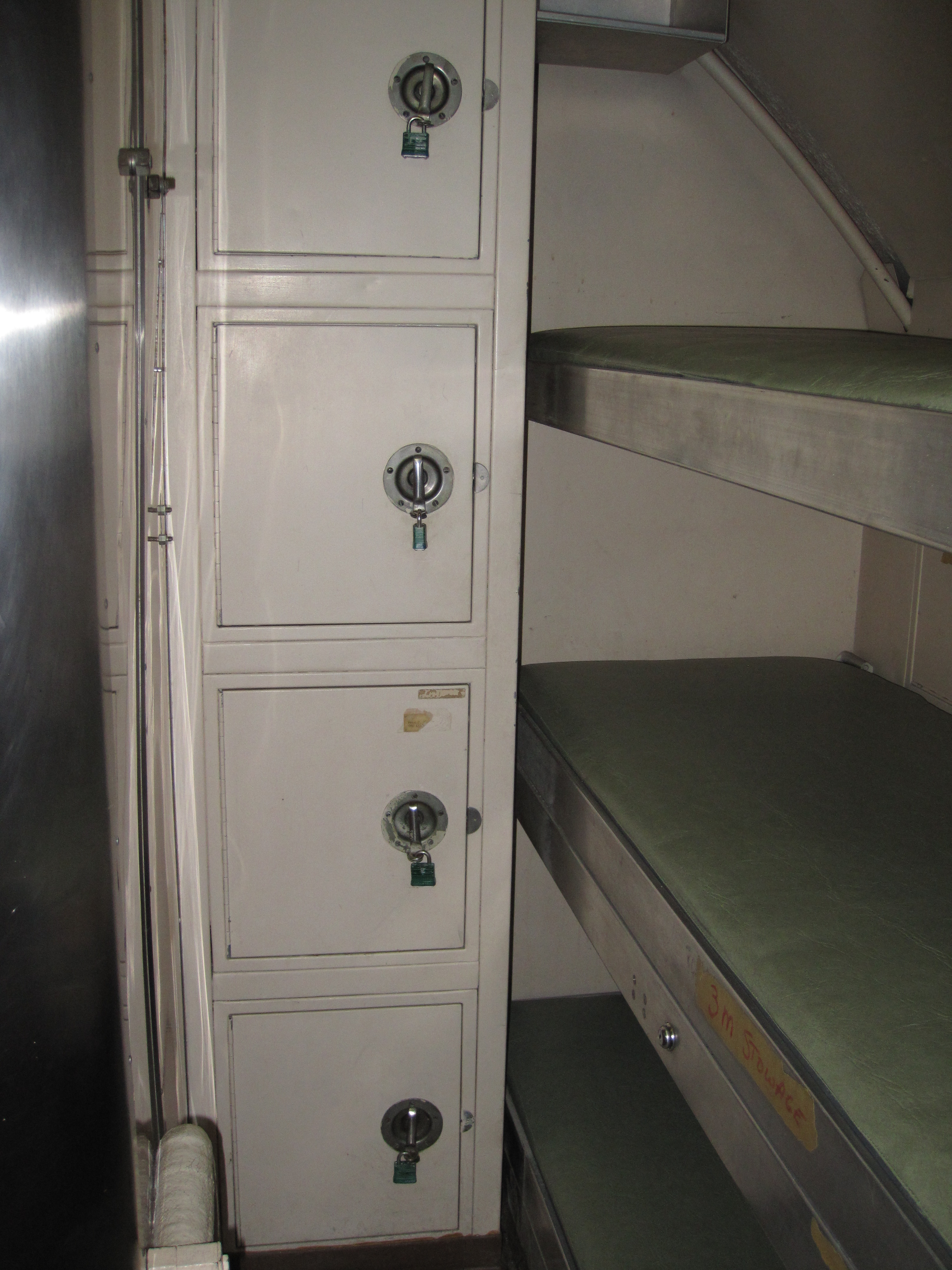
Bunks and lockers

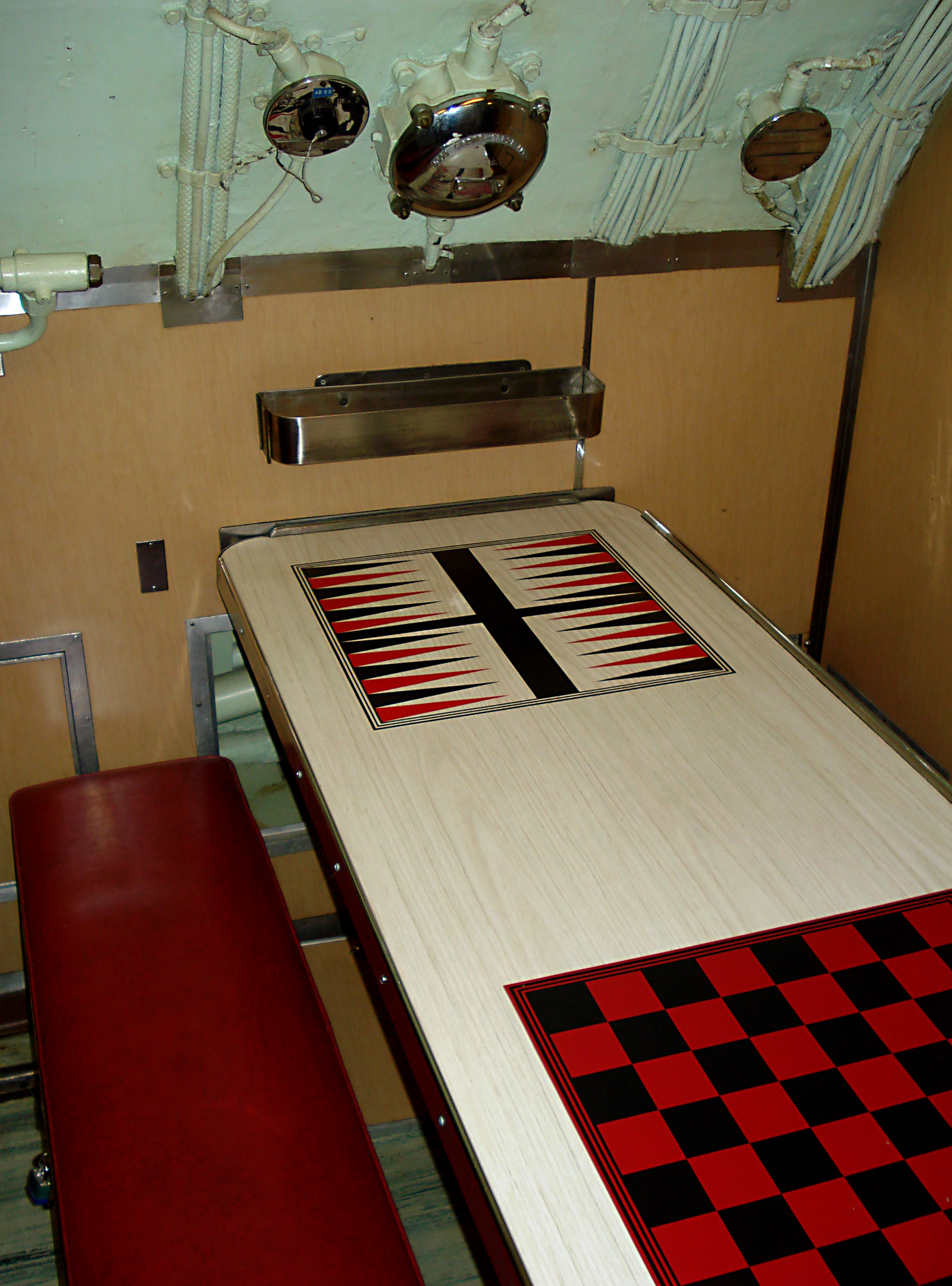
Crew area

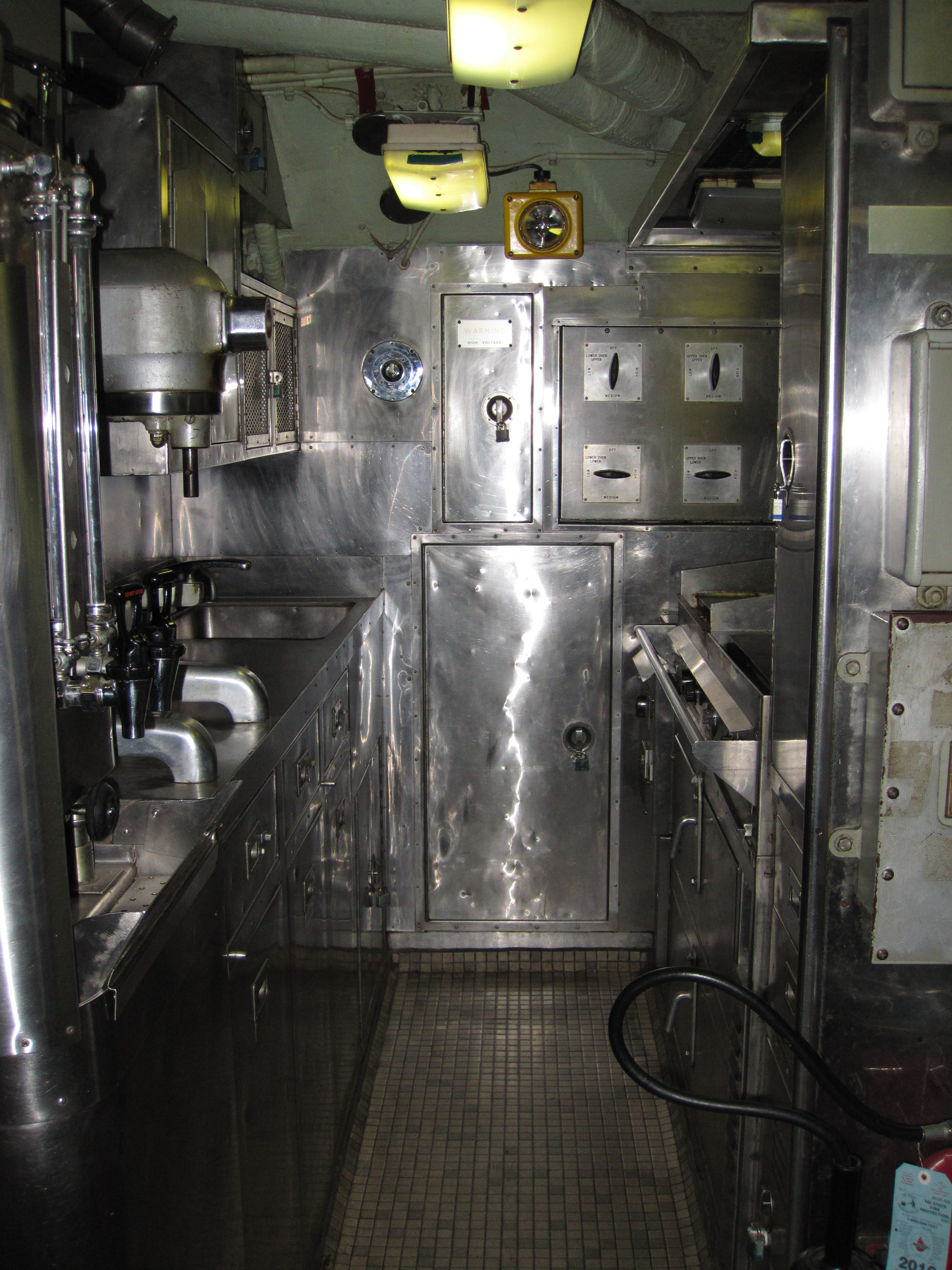
Galley

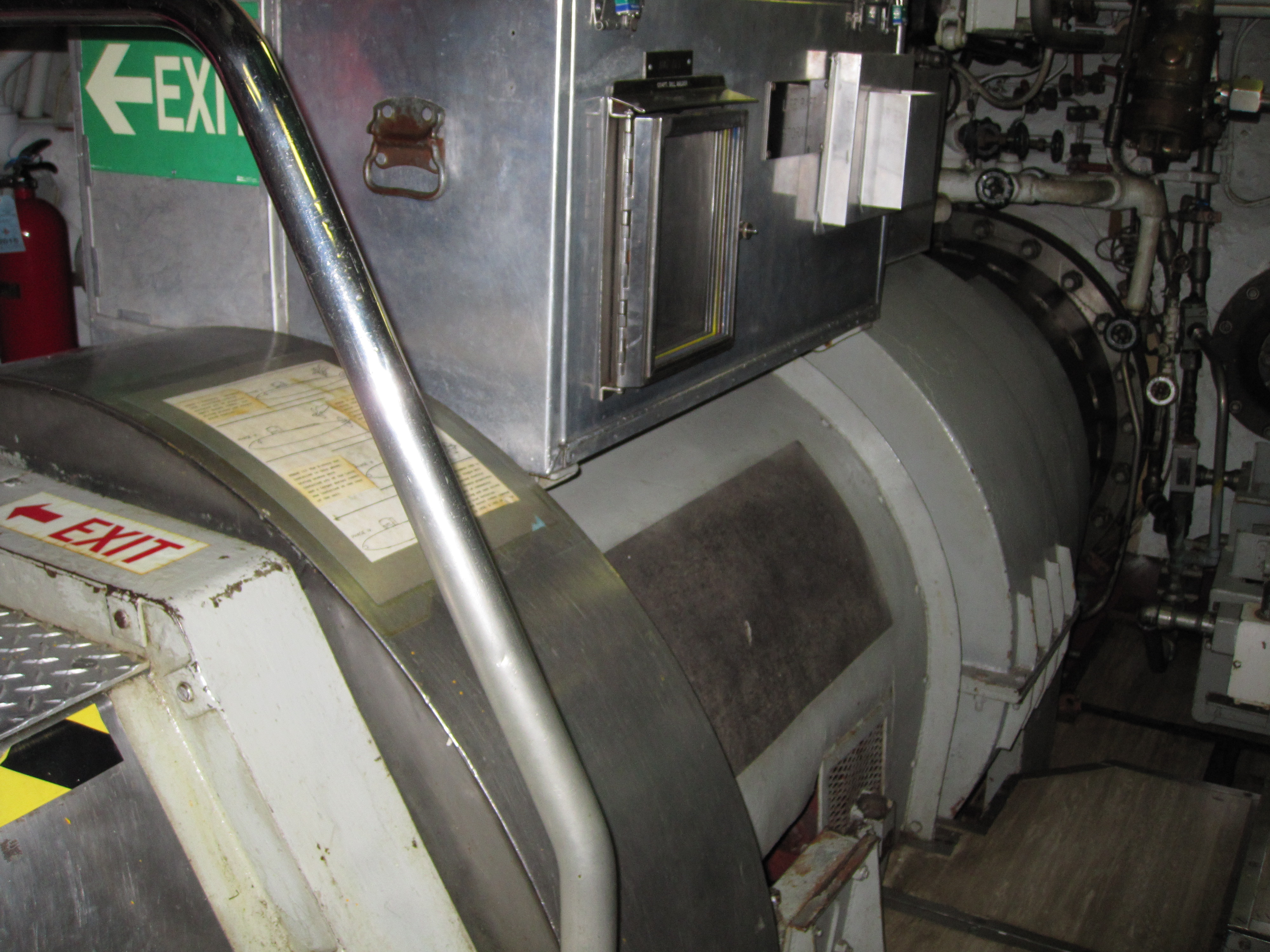
Engine room

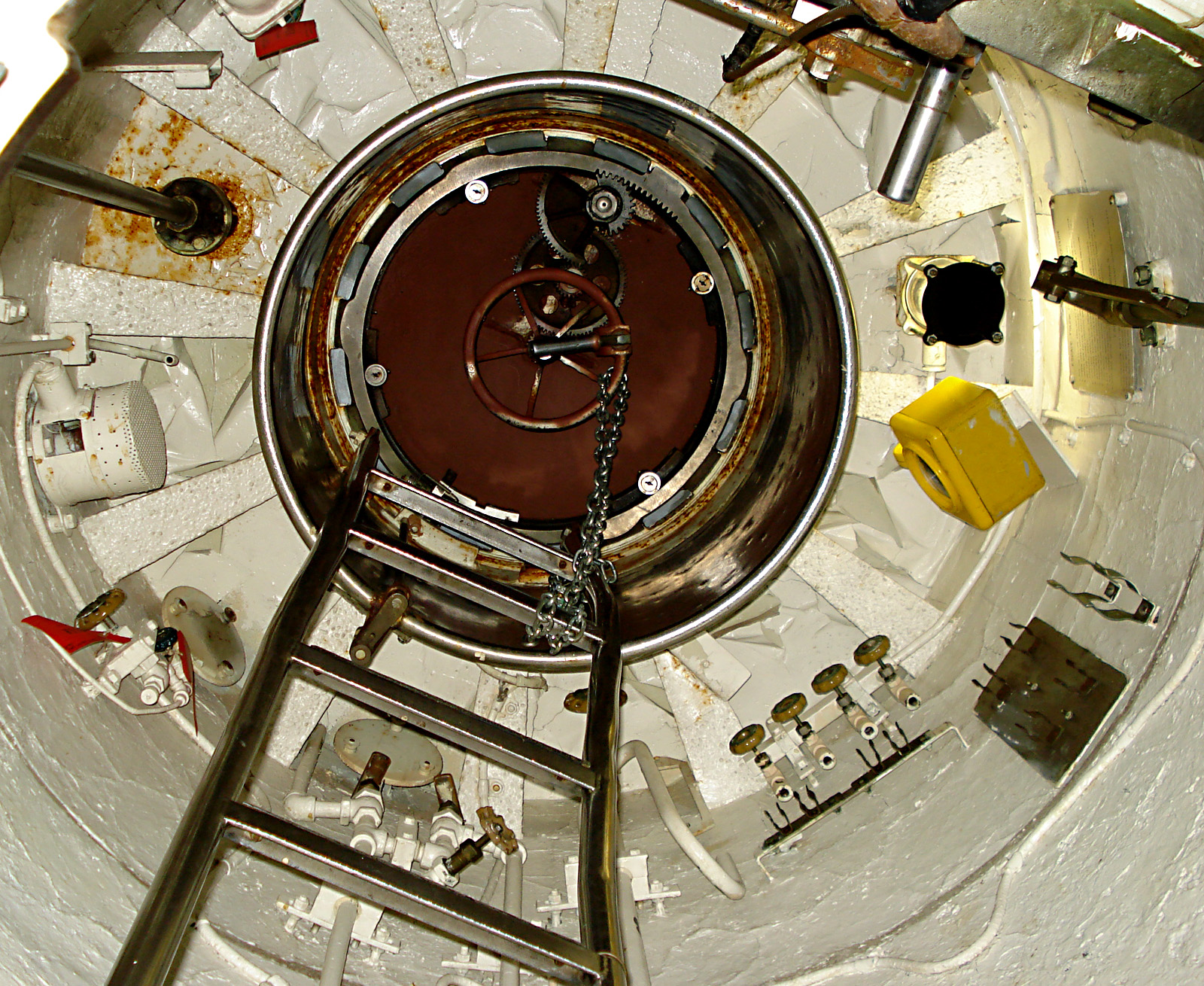
Hatch

== See also ==
- List of National Historic Landmarks in New Hampshire
- National Register of Historic Places listings in Rockingham County, New Hampshire
- USS Barbel - lead boat of a class of three, first diesel-powered attack submarine with a teardrop hull, armed version of Albacore
- USS Blueback - last conventionally powered attack submarine in service with the USN, museum ship at OMSI Museum, Portland, Oregon, used in The Hunt for Red October movie
- USS Bonefish - last conventionally powered submarine built for the USN, laid down after Blueback, but launched and commissioned before

Other USN research submarines:

- Midget submarine X-1
- Nuclear research submarine NR-1

== Sources ==
- Largess, Robert; Mandelblatt, James (2003). U.S.S. Albacore: Forerunner of the Future. Portsmouth Marine Society. ISBN 9780915819249.
- Christley, Jim; Grulich, Fred; Patterson, John (2004). "Question 18/03: Pancake Submarine Diesel Engines". Warship International. XLI (2): 126–129. ISSN 0043-0374.
- Polmar, Norman; Moore, K. J. (2003). Cold War Submarines: The Design and Construction of U.S. and Soviet Submarines, 1945-2001. Potomac Books. pp. 127–146. ISBN 1574885944 – via vdocuments.site. "Chapter 9, The Quest for Speed"
- Hunter, Jack; Jordan, Austin, eds. (2017). USS Albacore (AGSS569): An Oral History. CreateSpace Independent Publishing Platform. ISBN 978-1540646040. Archived from the original on 4 April 2018.
