= USS Topeka (SSN-754) =

Los Angeles-class nuclear-powered attack submarine of the US Navy

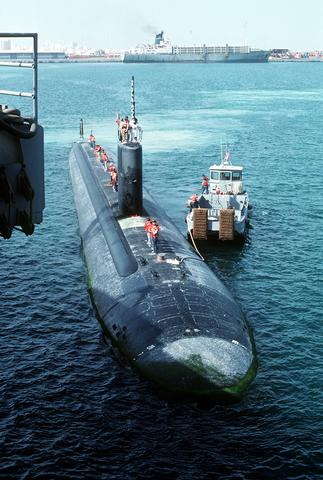
- USS Topeka (SSN-754) prepares to dock with the assistance of a tugboat.

History

United States
- Name: USS Topeka
- Namesake: The City of Topeka, Kansas
- Awarded: 28 November 1983
- Builder: General Dynamics Electric Boat
- Laid down: 13 May 1986
- Launched: 23 January 1988
- Sponsored by: Elizabeth Dole
- Commissioned: 21 October 1989
- Decommissioned: 3 June 2026
- Out of service: 31 January 2025
- Home port: PSNS Bremerton
- Identification: MMSI number: 369970227; Callsign: NTOP
- Motto: Defender of the Heartland
- Status: Decommissioned
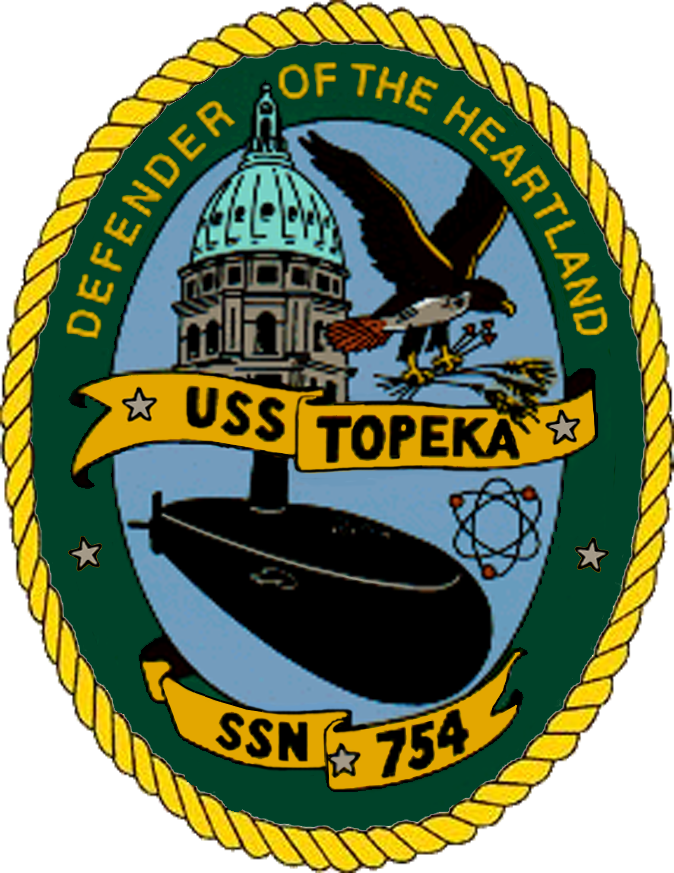
- Badge

General characteristics
- Class & type: Los Angeles-class submarine
- Displacement: 5,726 long tons (5,818 t) light; 6,131 long tons (6,229 t) full; 405 long tons (411 t) dead
- Length: 110.3 m (361 ft 11 in)
- Beam: 10 m (32 ft 10 in)
- Draft: 9.4 m (30 ft 10 in)
- Propulsion: 1 × S6G PWR nuclear reactor with D2W core (165 MW), HEU 93.5%; 2 × steam turbines (33,500) shp; 1 × shaft; 1 × secondary propulsion motor 325 hp (242 kW)
- Test depth: 400 m (1,312 ft)
- Complement: 12 officers, 98 men
- Armament: 4 × 21 in (533 mm) bow tubes; 12 × vertical launch Tomahawk missiles

USS Topeka (SSN-754) is a Los Angeles-class submarine and the third United States Navy vessel to be named for Topeka, Kansas. The contract to build her was awarded to the Electric Boat Division of General Dynamics Corporation in Groton, Connecticut, on 28 November 1983 and her keel was laid down on 13 May 1986. She was launched on 23 January 1988, sponsored by Elizabeth Dole, and commissioned on 21 October 1989.

== History ==
During New Year's Eve 2000, Topeka straddled the International Date Line, thus was famously "in two millenniums at once".

In October 2002, after completing a Modernization Period in Pearl Harbor Naval Shipyard, Topeka shifted homeport to San Diego, California, from Pearl Harbor.

In December 2012, the submarine began an overhaul at Portsmouth Naval Shipyard. Earlier that same year, she completed a six-month-long deployment in the Western Pacific, covering around 35,000 nautical miles.

In May 2015, after miscellaneous repairs at Pearl Harbor Naval Shipyard, Topeka shifted homeport to Naval Base Guam as part of the U.S. Navy's rebalance of force into the Pacific.

In December 2020, Topeka shifted homeport to Naval Station Pearl Harbor.

Topeka participated in RIMPAC 2022.

== Awards ==
COMSUBRON 11 Battle "E" - 1993/1995 In August 2004, Topeka returned to San Diego after six months of operations with the Seventh Fleet, including three missions significant to national security that earned the boat the Navy Expeditionary Medal and Navy Unit Commendation Medal. The ship and crew earned the Battle Efficiency "E" Award for 2004, 2005, 2007, 2008, 2009, 2016, and 2021.
