= Indian Navy =

Maritime service branch of the Indian Armed Forces

- Bhāratīya Nau Senā
- Emblem of the Indian Navy
- Founded: 26 January 1950; 76 years ago (as current service) 5 September 1612; 414 years ago (as East India Company's Marine)
- Country: India
- Type: Navy
- Role: Naval warfare, force projection, sealift, nuclear deterrence
- Size: 73,869 active personnel 75,000 reserve personnel (250 ships including auxiliaries); Approx. 300 aircraft
- Part of: Indian Armed Forces
- Headquarters: Nausena Bhawan, Delhi Cantonment, Delhi
- Mottos: Shaṁ No Varunaḥ (ISO) transl. 'May the Lord of Water be auspicious to us' (from Taittiriya Upanishad)
- Colours: Navy blue, gold and white
- March: Quick: Jai Bharati (Victory to India); Slow: Anand Lok (Realm of Joy)
- Anniversaries: Navy Day: 4 December
- Operational fleet: as of 2025: 2 Aircraft carriers 1 Amphibious transport dock 4 Landing Ship Tanks 8 Landing Craft Utility 13 Destroyers 17 Frigates 18 Corvettes 3 Nuclear submarines 17 Diesel Submarines 10 Offshore Patrol Vessels 115 Patrol vessels 5 Replenishment Oilers other auxiliary vessels
- Engagements: Major wars and operations: Portuguese-Indian War Indo-Pakistani War of 1965 Operation Trident 1971 insurgency in Ceylon Operation Python Indo-Pakistani Naval War of 1971 Indo-Pakistani War of 1971 Operation Lal Dora Operation Cactus Operation Flowers are Blooming Kargil War (Operation Talwar) Anti-piracy operations in Somalia 2008 India–Pakistan standoff Operation Ocean Shield 2016–2018 India–Pakistan border skirmishes 2019 India–Pakistan border skirmishes 2020–2021 China–India skirmishes 2025 India–Pakistan conflict

Commanders
- Commander-in-Chief: (India) President Droupadi Murmu
- Chief of the Naval Staff (CNS): Admiral Krishna Swaminathan
- Vice Chief of the Naval Staff (VCNS): Vice Admiral Ajay Kochhar
- Navy Master Chief Petty Officer: Dilbahadur Chhetri, MCERA I
- Notable commanders: Admiral S. M. Nanda; Admiral Ram Dass Katari

Insignia
- Ensign

- Jack

- Pennant

- President's Colour

Aircraft flown
- Fighter: Mikoyan MiG-29K, Dassault Rafale-M
- Helicopter: Dhruv, Ka-28, Ka-31, Sea King Mk.42C, UH-3 Sea King, Chetak, Sikorsky MH-60R
- Utility helicopter: Dhruv
- Patrol: Boeing P-8 Poseidon, Dornier 228, Britten-Norman BN-2
- Reconnaissance: IAI Heron, IAI Searcher Mk II, General Atomics MQ-9B SeaGuardian
- Trainer: BAE Hawk, HAL HJT-16, Pipistrel Virus, MiG-29KUB

The Indian Navy (IN) (ISO: Bhāratīya Nau Senā) is the maritime branch of the Indian Armed Forces. The President of India is the Supreme Commander of the Indian Navy. The Chief of Naval Staff, a four-star admiral, commands the navy. As a blue-water navy, it operates significantly in the Persian Gulf Region, the Horn of Africa, the Strait of Malacca, and routinely conducts anti-piracy operations with other navies in the region. It also conducts routine two to three month-long deployments in the South and East China seas as well as in the western Mediterranean sea simultaneously.

The primary objective of the navy is to safeguard the nation's maritime borders, and in conjunction with other Armed Forces of the union, act to deter or defeat any threats or aggression against the territory, people or maritime interests of India, both in war and peace. Through joint exercises, goodwill visits and humanitarian missions, including disaster relief, the Indian Navy promotes bilateral relations between nations. Since October 2008, the Indian Navy keeps at least one frontline warship on continuous deployment in the Gulf of Aden.

As of June 2019, the Indian Navy has 67,252 active and 75,000 reserve personnel in service and has a fleet of 150 ships and submarines, and 300 aircraft. As of 2025, the operational fleet consists of 2 active aircraft carriers and 1 amphibious transport dock, 4 landing ship tanks, 8 landing craft utility, 13 destroyers, 17 frigates, 2 ballistic missile submarines, 17 conventionally-powered attack submarines, 18 corvettes, one mine countermeasure vessel, 4 fleet tankers and numerous other auxiliary vessels, small patrol boats and sophisticated ships. It is considered as a multi-regional power projection blue-water navy.

== History ==
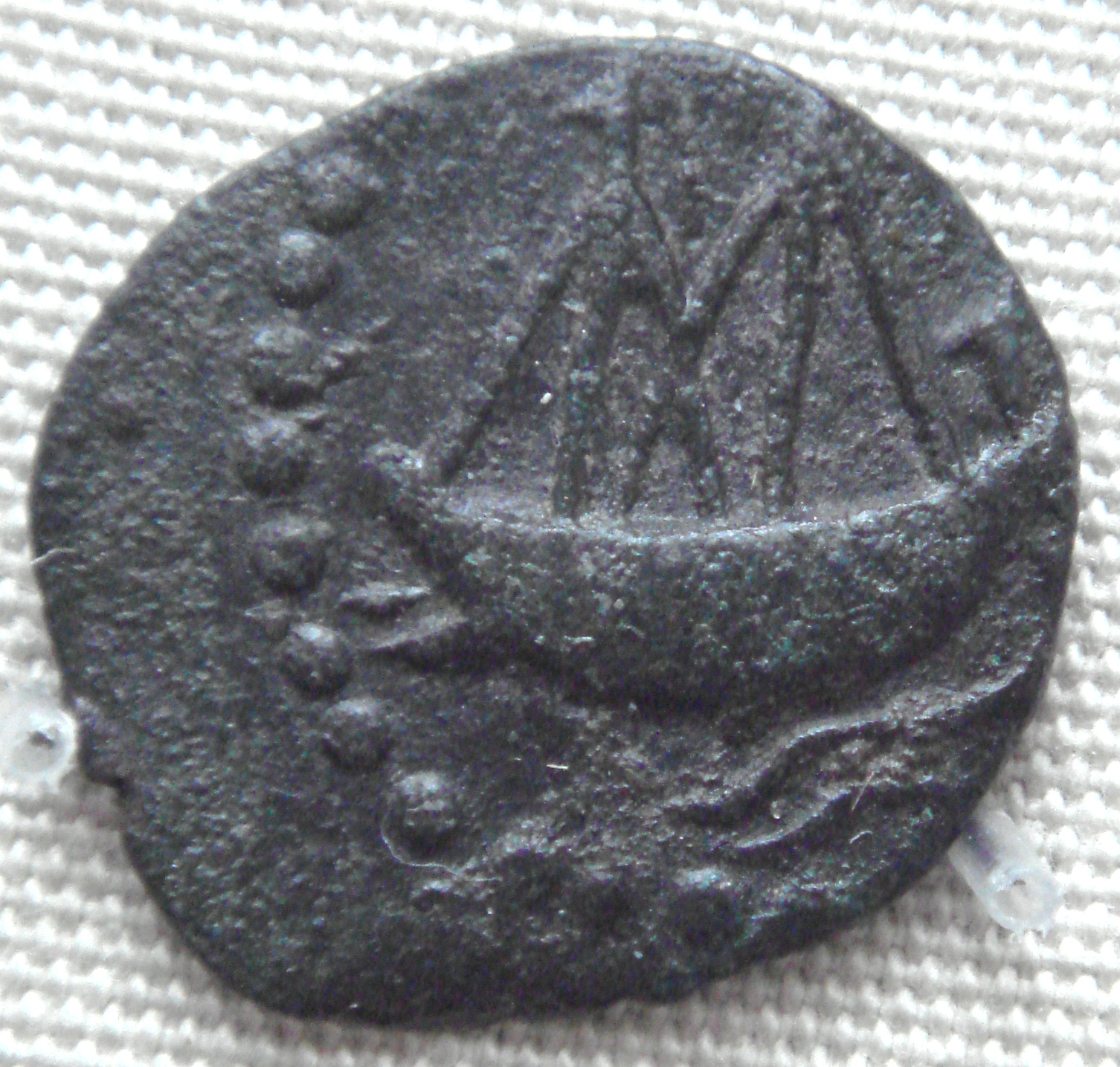
Ancient Indian ship on lead coin of Vasisthiputra Sri Pulamavi, testimony to the naval, seafaring and trading capabilities of the Sātavāhana Empire, during the 1st–2nd century CE.

=== Early maritime history ===
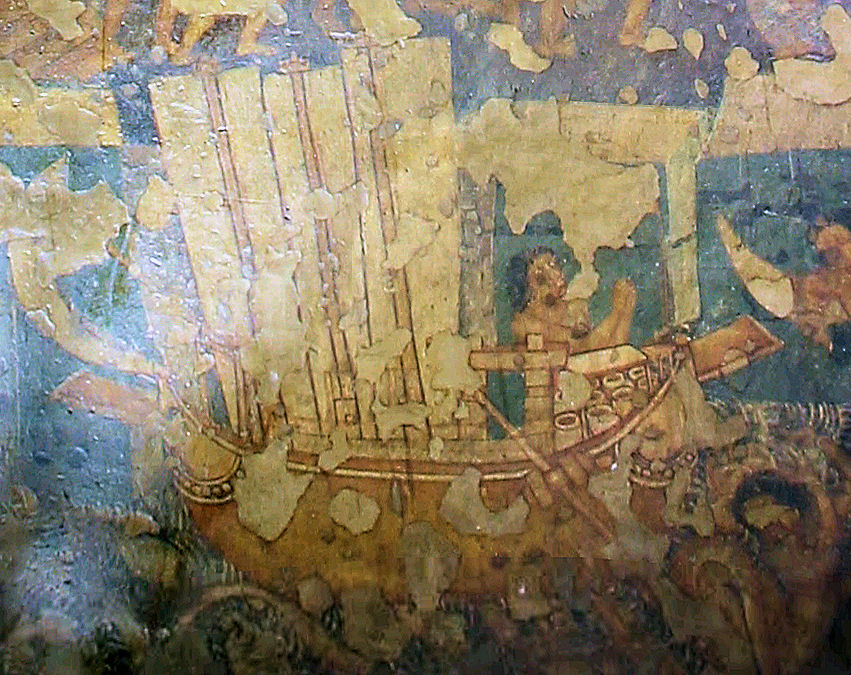
Three-mast sailship, Ajanta Caves Cave No.2 c. 5th century.

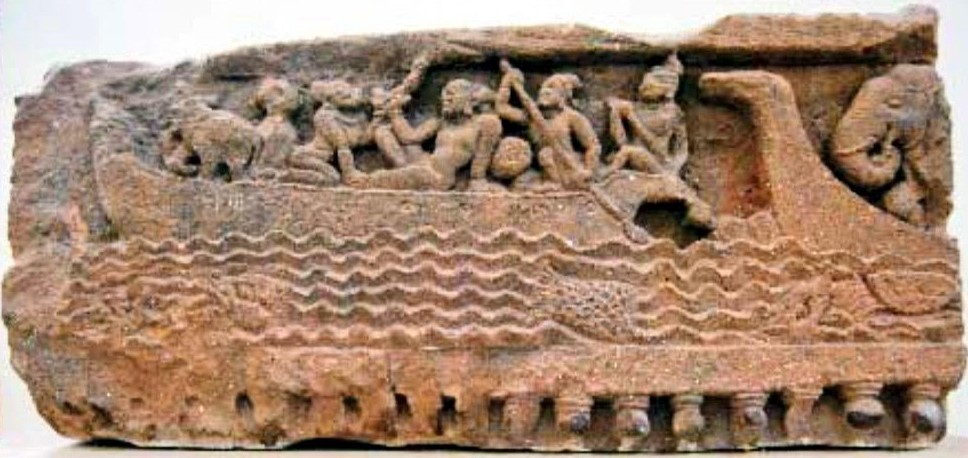
Sculptured frieze depicting two Boitas of Ancient Kalinga found near Brahmeswara Temple. 10th century.

The maritime history of India dates back 6,000 years to the pre-Indus Valley Civilisation. A Kutch mariner's log book from 19th century recorded that the first tidal dock in India was built at Lothal around 2300 BC during the Indus Valley Civilisation, near the present-day harbor of Mangrol on the Gujarat coast. The Rig Veda credits Varuna, the Hindu god of water and the celestial ocean, with knowledge of the ocean routes and describes the use of ships having hundred oars in the naval expeditions by Indians. There are also references to the side wings of a ship called Plava, which stabilise the vessel during storms. Plava are considered to be the precursors of modern-day stabilisers.

Alexander the Great, during his campaigns in India, built a harbour at the ancient city of Patala, which has been hyphothzied to be the present day city of Thatta. His army retreated to Mesopotamia using ships built at Sindh. In the period after his conquest, records show that the Emperor of Maurya Empire, Chandragupta Maurya, as a part of his war office, established an Admiralty Division. Many historians from ancient India recorded Indian trade relations. Indian trade reached Java and Sumatra. There were also references to the trade routes of countries in the Pacific and Indian Ocean. India also had trade relations with the Greeks and the Romans. At one instance Roman historian Gaius Plinius Secundus mentioned Indian traders carrying away large masses of gold and silver from Rome, in payment for skins, precious stones, clothes, indigo, sandalwood, herbs, perfumes, and spices.

During 5–10 AD, Kalinga conquered Western Java, Sumatra and Malaya. The Andaman and Nicobar Islands served as an important halt point for trade ships en route to these nations and as well as China.

=== Middle Ages ===
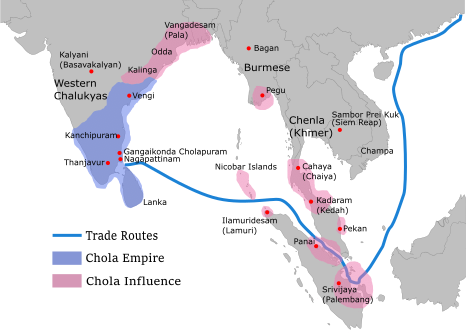
Chola territories during Rajendra Chola I, c. 1030

Medieval Empires in the Indian subcontinent further developed their naval forces. During 844–848 AD the daily revenue from these nations was expected to be around 200 maunds (8 tonnes (7.9 long tons; 8.8 short tons)) of gold. During 984–1042 AD, under the reign of Raja Raja Chola I, Rajendra Chola I and Kulothunga Chola I, a naval expedition by the Chola dynasty captured parts of Burma, Sumatra, Sri Lanka, and Malaya, and simultaneously repressed pirate activities by Sumatran warlords.

Marco Polo's remark on Indian ships (1292 AD)

... built of fir timber, having a sheath of boards laid over the planking in every part, caulked with oakum and fastened with iron nails. The bottoms were smeared with a preparation of quicklime and hemp, pounded together and mixed with oil from a certain tree which is a better material than pith

—

During the 14th and 15th centuries, Indian shipbuilding and maritime abilities skill set exceeded European capabilities at the time. Their ships could carry over a hundred crew and were compartmentalized to limit the effect of damage keeping the ship afloat.

=== Decline ===
By the end of 15th century Indian naval power had started to decline, and had reached its low by the time the Portuguese entered India. Soon after they set foot in India, the Portuguese started to seize all Asian vessels not permitting their trade. Amidst this, in 1529, a naval war at Bombay Harbour resulted in the surrender of Thane, Karanja, and Bandora. By 1534, the Portuguese took complete control over Bombay Harbour. The Zamorin of Calicut challenged the Portuguese trade when Vasco da Gama refused to pay the customs levy as per the trade agreement. This resulted in two major naval wars, the first one—Battle of Cochin, was fought in 1504, and the second engagement happened four years later off Diu. Both these wars exposed the weakness of Indian maritime power and simultaneously helped the Portuguese to gain mastery over the Indian waters. However, in 1526 the Zamorin launched the siege of Calicut on the Portuguese forts in Calicut, successfully eliminating Portuguese influence in the city.

=== Later revival ===
By the later seventeenth century Indian naval power revived. The Mughal Empire maintained a significant naval fleet although it was the weakest branch of the military.

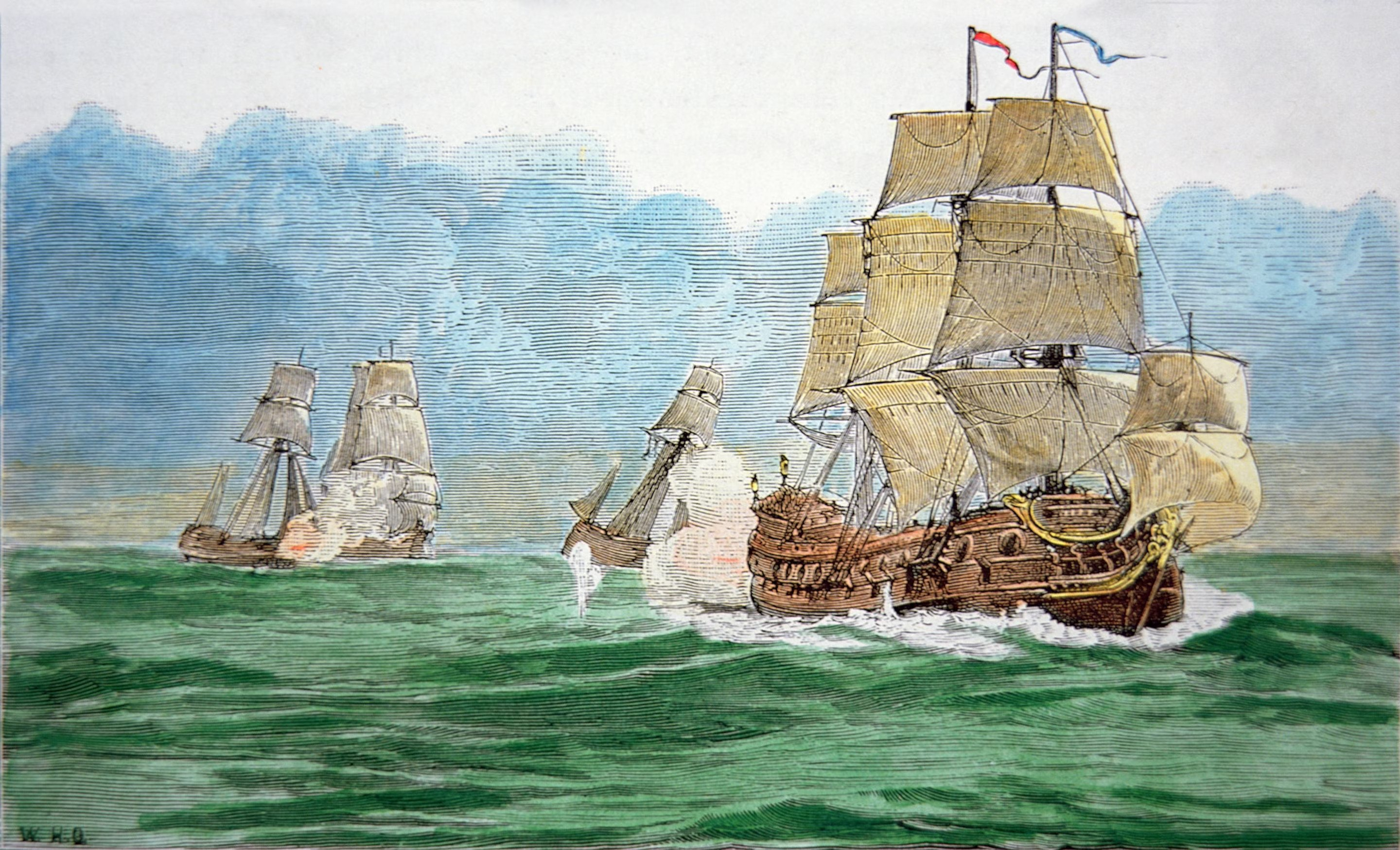
The Ganj-i-Sawai, one of the largest trade ships in the 17th century.

Empress Mariam-uz-Zamani maintained large fleets of trade ships including the Rahīmī and Ganj-i-Sawai. The Rahimi was the largest of the Indian ships trading in the Red Sea. After being sacked by pirates, this ship was replaced by the Ganj-i-Sawa. This ship was eventually sacked by English Pirate Henry Every. The Navy mainly patrolled coastal areas. The navy was active in the Siege of Hooghly and the Anglo-Mughal War. One of the best-documented naval campaign of the Mughal empire were provided during the conflict against kingdom of Arakan, where in December 1665, Aurangzeb dispatched Shaista Khan, his governor of Bengal to command 288 vessels and more than 20,000 men to pacify the pirate activities within Arakan territory and to capture Chittagong,

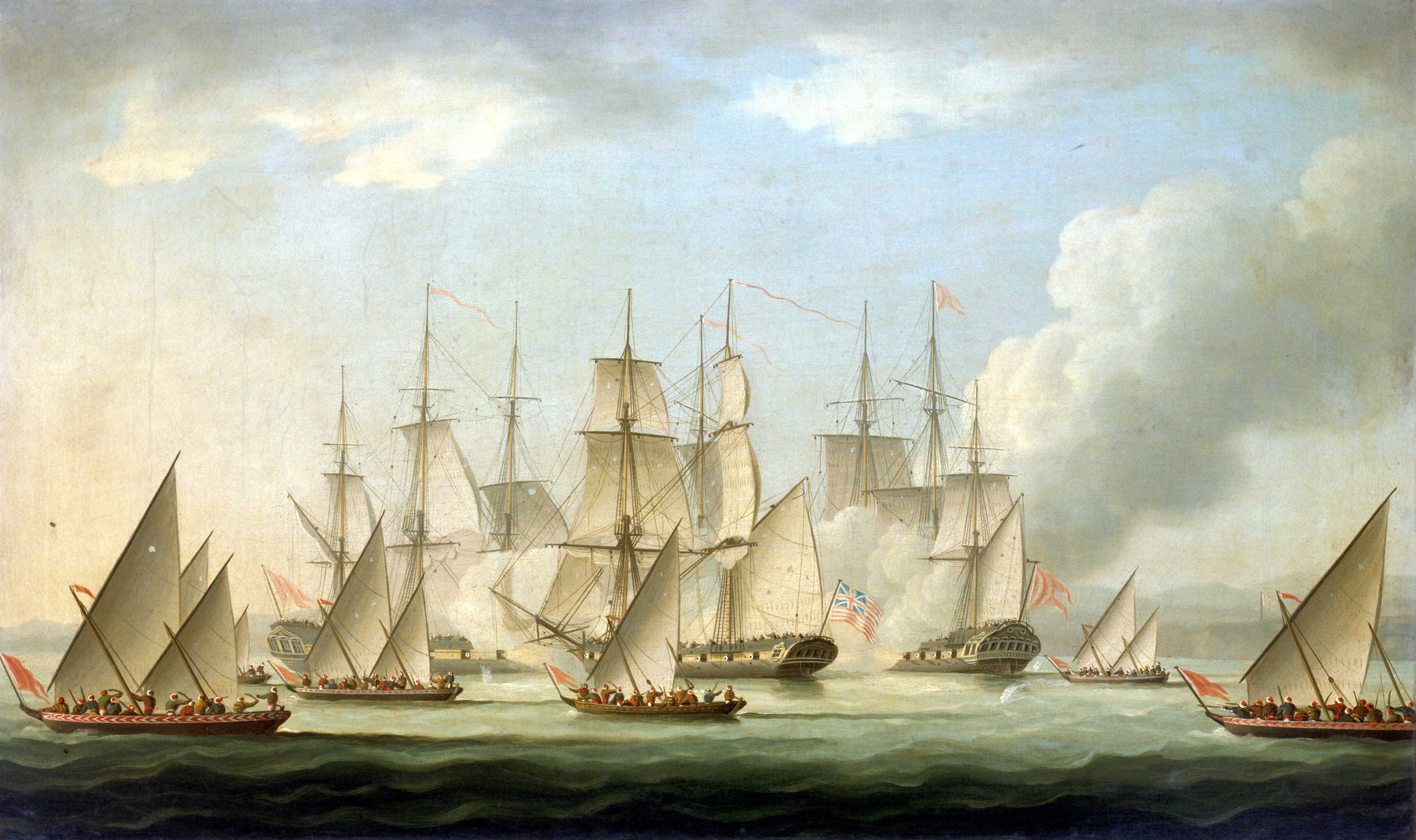
A depiction of a Maratha naval attack in 1812 against the East India Company's ship Aurora.

The Maratha Confederacy had a significant coastal navy. The alliance of the Moghuls and the Sidis of Janjira was marked as a major power on the west coast. On the southern front, the 1st Sovereign of the Maratha Kingdom, Chhatrapati Shivaji Maharaj, started creating his own fleet. His fleet was commanded by notable admirals like Sidhoji Gujar and Kanhoji Angre. The Maratha Navy under the leadership of Angre kept the English, Dutch and Portuguese away from the Konkan coast. However, the Marathas witnessed remarkable decline in their naval capabilities following the death of Angre in 1729.

The origins of the current Indian Navy date to 1612, when an English vessel under the command of Captain Thomas Best defeated the Portuguese at the Battle of Swally. Although the Portuguese were defeated, this incident along with the trouble caused by the pirates to the merchant vessels, forced the British to maintain fleet near Surat, Gujarat. East India Company (HEIC) formed a naval arm, and the first squadron of fighting ships reached the Gujarat coast on 5 September 1612. Their objective was to protect British merchant shipping off the Gulf of Cambay and up the Narmada and Tapti rivers. As the HEIC continued to expand its rule and influence over different parts of India, the responsibility of Company's Marine increased too.

Over time, the British predominantly operated from Bombay, and in 1686, the HEIC's naval arm was renamed the Bombay Marine. At times the Bombay Marine engaged Dutch, French, Maratha, and Sidi vessels. Much later, it was also involved in the First Anglo-Burmese War of 1824.

=== East India Company to independence ===
In 1834, the Bombay Marine became Her Majesty's Indian Navy. The Navy saw action in the First Opium War of 1840 and in the Second Anglo-Burmese War in 1852. Due to some unrecorded reasons, the Navy's name reverted to the Bombay Marine from 1863 to 1877, after which it was named Her Majesty's Indian Marine. At that time, the Marine operated in two divisions—the Eastern Division at Calcutta under the Superintendent of Bay of Bengal, and the Western Division at Bombay Superintendent of Arabian Sea. In 1892, the Marine was renamed the Royal Indian Marine, and by the end of the 19th century it operated over fifty ships. The Marine participated in World War I with a fleet of patrol vessels, troop carriers, and minesweepers. In 1928, D. N. Mukherji was the first Indian to be granted a commission, in the rank of an Engineer Sub-lieutenant. Also in 1928, the RIM was accorded combatant status, which entitled it to be considered a true fighting force and to fly the White Ensign of the Royal Navy. In 1934, the Marine was upgraded to a full naval force, thus becoming the Royal Indian Navy (RIN), and was presented the King's colours in recognition of its services to the British Crown.

During the early stages of World War II, the tiny Royal Indian Navy consisted of five sloops, one survey vessel, one depot ship, one patrol vessel and numerous assorted small craft; personnel strength was at only 114 officers and 1,732 sailors. The onset of war led to an expansion in numbers of vessels and personnel. By June 1940, the navy had doubled its number in terms of both personnel and material, and expanded nearly six times of its pre-war strength by 1942. The navy was actively involved in operations during the war around the world and was heavily involved in operations around the Indian Ocean, including convoy escorts, mine-sweeping and supply, as well as supporting amphibious assaults.

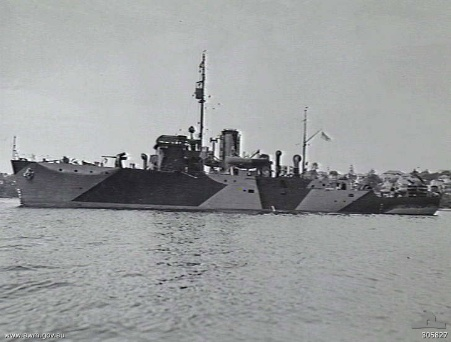
HMIS Bombay of Royal Indian Navy in Sydney Harbour during World War II

When hostilities ceased in August 1945, the Royal Indian Navy had expanded to a personnel strength of over 25,000 officers and sailors. Its fleet comprised seven sloops, four frigates, four corvettes, fourteen minesweepers, sixteen trawlers, two depot ships, thirty auxiliary vessels, one hundred and fifty landing craft, two hundred harbour craft and several offensive and defensive motor launches. During World War II the Navy suffered two hundred and seventy five casualties—twenty seven officers, two warrant officers and 123 ratings killed in action, two ratings missing in action and a further 14 officers, two warrant officers and 123 ratings wounded. For their role in the war, the officers and ratings of the Navy received the following honours and decorations—a KBE (Mil.), a knighthood, a CB (Mil.), 10 CIEs, two DSOs, a CBE, 15 DSCs, an OBE, 28 DSMs, eight OBIs, two IOMs, 16 BEMs, 10 Indian Defence Service Medals, a Royal Humane Society Medal, 105 mentions in dispatches and 118 assorted commendations. Immediately after the war, the navy underwent a rapid, large-scale demobilisation of vessels and personnel.

From the inception of India's naval force, some senior Indian politicians had voiced concerns about the degree of "Indianisation" of the Navy and its subordination to the Royal Navy in all important aspects. On the eve of WWII, the RIN had no Indian senior line officers and only a single Indian senior engineer officer. Even by the war's end, the Navy remained a predominantly British-officered service; in 1945, no Indian officer held a rank above engineer commander and only a few Indian officers in the executive branch held substantive senior line officer rank. This situation, coupled with inadequate levels of training and discipline, poor communication between officers and ratings, instances of racial discrimination and the ongoing trials of ex-Indian National Army personnel ignited the Royal Indian Navy mutiny by Indian ratings in 1946. A total of 78 ships, 20 shore establishments and 20,000 sailors were involved in the strike, which spread over much of India. After the strike began, the sailors received encouragement and support from the Communist Party in India; unrest spread from the naval ships, and led to student and worker hartals in Bombay. The strike ultimately failed as the sailors did not receive substantial support from either the Indian Army or from political leaders in Congress or the Muslim League. On 21 July 1947, H.M.S. Choudhry and Bhaskar Sadashiv Soman, both of whom would eventually command the Pakistani and Indian Navies, respectively, became the first Indian RIN officers to attain the acting rank of captain.

=== Independence to the end of the 20th century ===
Following independence and the partition of India on 15 August 1947, the RIN's depleted fleet of ships and remaining personnel were divided between the newly independent Dominion of India and Dominion of Pakistan. 21 per cent of the Navy's officer cadre and 47 per cent of its sailors opted to join the portion of the fleet which became the Royal Pakistan Navy. The Indian share of the Navy consisted of 32 vessels along with 11,000 personnel. Effective from the same date, all British officers were compulsorily retired from the Navy and its reserve components, with Indian officers being promoted to replace British senior officers. However, a number of British flag and senior officers were invited to continue serving in the RIN, as only nine of the Navy's Indian commissioned officers had more than 10 years' service, with the majority of them only having served from five to eight years. Rear Admiral John Talbot Savignac Hall headed the Navy as its first Commander-in-Chief (C-in-C) post-Independence. In January 1948, D.N. Mukherji, the first Indian officer in the RIN, became the first Indian to be promoted acting engineer captain. In May 1948, Captain Ajitendu Chakraverti became the first Indian officer to be appointed to the rank of commodore. When India became a republic on 26 January 1950, the Royal prefix was dropped and the name Indian Navy was officially adopted. The prefix for naval vessels was changed from His Majesty's Indian Ship (HMIS) to Indian Naval Ship (INS). At the same time, the imperial crown in insignia was replaced with the Lion Capital of Ashoka and the Union Jack in the canton of the White Ensign was replaced with the Indian Tricolour.

By 1955, the Navy had largely overcome its post-Independence personnel shortfalls. During the early years following independence, many British officers continued to serve in the Navy on secondment from the Royal Navy, due to the post-Independence retirement or transfer of many experienced officers to the Royal or the Pakistan navies. The first C-in-C of the Navy was Admiral Sir Edward Parry who took over from Hall in 1948 and handed over to Admiral Sir Charles Thomas Mark Pizey in 1951. Admiral Pizey also became the first Chief of the Naval Staff in 1955, and was succeeded by Vice Admiral Sir Stephen Hope Carlill the same year The pace of "Indianising" continued steadily through the 1950s. By 1952, senior Naval appointments had begun to be filled by Indian officers, and by 1955, basic training for naval cadets was entirely conducted in India. In 1956, Ram Dass Katari became the first Indian flag officer, and was appointed the first Indian Commander of the Fleet on 2 October. On 22 April 1958, Vice Admiral Katari assumed the command of the Indian Navy from Carlill as the first Indian Chief of Staff of the Indian Navy. With the departure in 1962 of the last British officer on secondment to the Navy, Commodore David Kirke, the Chief of Naval Aviation, the Indian Navy finally became an entirely Indian service.

The first engagement in action of the Indian Navy was against the Portuguese Navy during the liberation of Goa in 1961. Operation Vijay followed years of escalating tension due to Portuguese refusal to relinquish its colonies in India. On 21 November 1961, Portuguese troops fired on the passenger liner Sabarmati near Anjadip Island, killing one person and injuring another. During Operation Vijay, the Indian Navy supported troop landings and provided fire support. The cruiser INS Delhi sank one Portuguese patrol boat, while frigates INS Betwa and INS Beas destroyed the Portuguese frigate NRP Afonso de Albuquerque. The 1962 Sino-Indian War was largely fought over the Himalayas and the Navy had only a defensive role in the war.

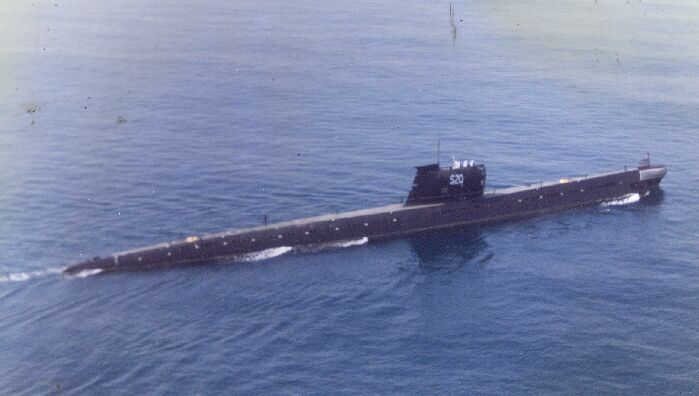
INS Kursura, an Indian submarine which played a vital role in the 1971 Indo-Pak war

At the outbreak of Indo-Pakistani War of 1965, the Navy had one aircraft carrier, two cruisers, nineteen destroyers and frigates, and one tanker. Of these twenty-ships ten were under refit. The others were largely involved coastal patrols. During the war, the Pakistani Navy attacked the Indian coastal city of Dwarka, although there were no military resources in the area. While this attack was insignificant, India deployed naval resources to patrol the coast and deter further bombardment. Following these wars in the 1960s, India resolved to strengthen the profile and capabilities of its Armed Forces.

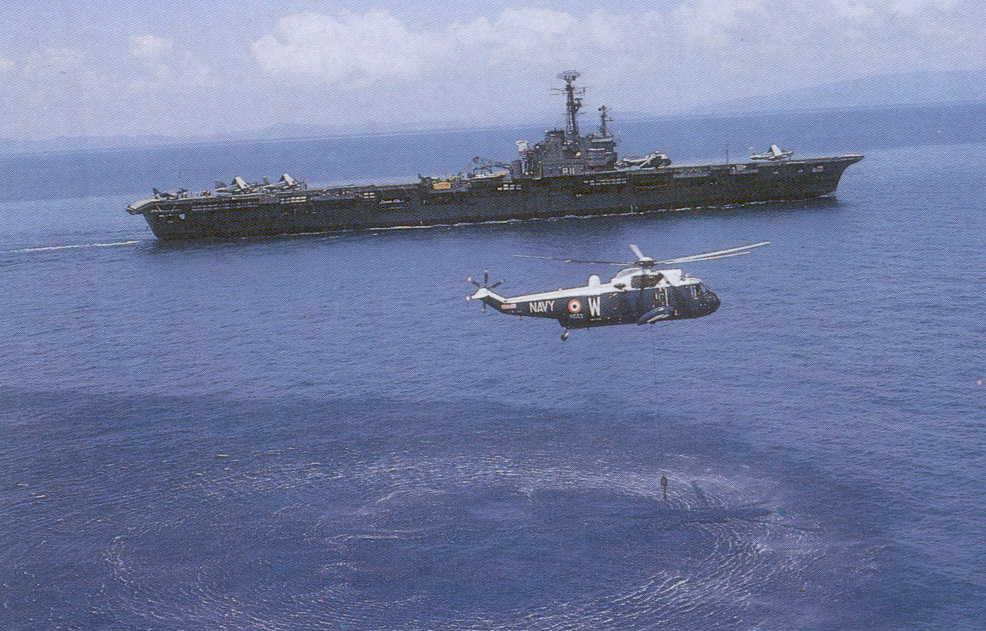
Aircraft carrier INS Vikrant during the Indo-Pakistani War of 1971. The ship played a crucial role in enforcing the naval blockade on East Pakistan and ensuring India's victory during the war.

The dramatic change in the Indian Navy's capabilities and stance was emphatically demonstrated during the Indo-Pakistani War of 1971. Under the command of Admiral Sardarilal Mathradas Nanda, the navy successfully enforced a naval blockade of West and East Pakistan. Pakistan's lone long-range submarine PNS Ghazi was sunk following an attack by the destroyer INS Rajput off the coast of Visakhapatnam in the midnight of 3–4 December 1971. On 4 December, the Indian Navy successfully executed Operation Trident, a devastating attack on the Pakistan Naval Headquarters of Karachi that sank a minesweeper, a destroyer and an ammunition supply ship. The attack also irreparably damaged another destroyer and oil storage tanks at the Karachi port. To commemorate this, 4 December is celebrated as the Navy Day. This was followed by Operation Python on 8 December 1971, further deprecating the Pakistan Navy's capabilities. Indian frigate INS Khukri, commanded by Captain M. N. Mulla was sunk by PNS Hangor, while INS Kirpan was damaged on the west coast. In the Bay of Bengal, the aircraft carrier INS Vikrant was deployed to successfully enforce the naval blockade on East Pakistan. Sea Hawk and the Alizé aircraft from INS Vikrant sank numerous gunboats and Pakistani merchant marine ships. To demonstrate its solidarity as an ally of Pakistan, the United States sent Task Force 74 centred around the aircraft carrier USS Enterprise into the Bay of Bengal. In retaliation, Soviet Navy submarines trailed the American task force, which moved away from the Indian Ocean towards Southeast Asia to avert a confrontation. In the end, the Indian naval blockade of Pakistan choked off the supply of reinforcements to the Pakistani forces, which proved to be decisive in the overwhelming defeat of Pakistan.

Since playing a decisive role in the victory, the navy has been a deterrent force maintaining peace for India in a region of turmoil. In 1983, the Indian Navy planned for Operation Lal Dora to support the government of Mauritius against a feared coup. In 1986, in Operation Flowers are Blooming, the Indian Navy averted an attempted coup in the Seychelles. In 1988, India launched Operation Cactus, to successfully thwart a coup d'état by PLOTE in the Maldives. Naval maritime reconnaissance aircraft detected the ship hijacked by PLOTE rebels. INS Godavari and Indian marine commandos recaptured the ship and arrested the rebels. During the 1999 Kargil War, the Western and Eastern fleets were deployed in the Northern Arabian Sea, as a part of Operation Talwar. They safeguarded India's maritime assets from a potential Pakistani naval attack, and also deterred Pakistan from attempting to block India's sea-trade routes. The Indian Navy's aviators flew sorties and marine commandos fought alongside Indian Army personnel in the Himalayas.

In October 1999, the Navy along with the Indian Coast Guard rescued MV Alondra Rainbow, a pirated Japanese cargo ship.

=== 21st century onwards ===
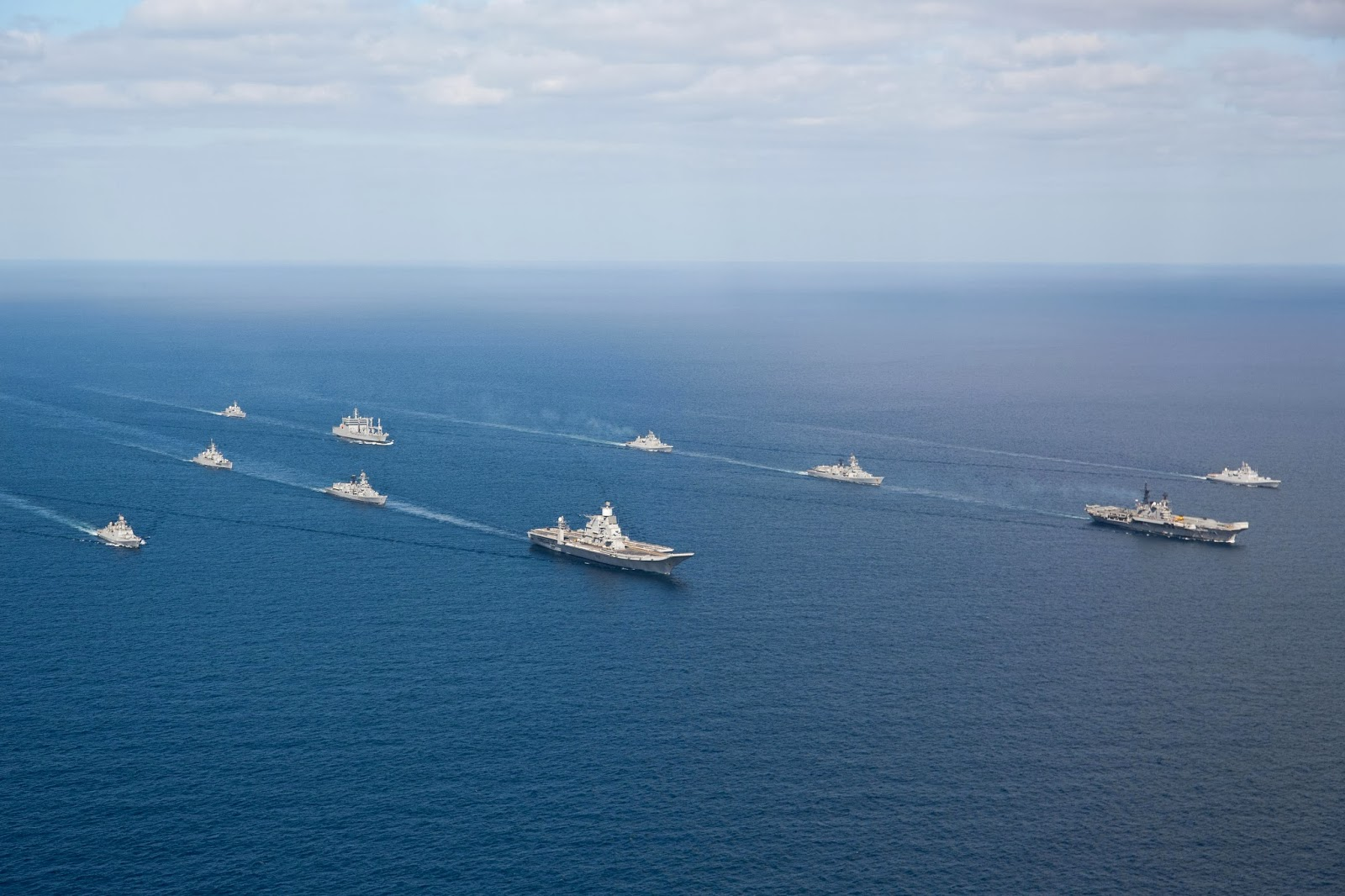
Indian Navy flotilla including aircraft carrier INS Viraat escorting INS Vikramaditya on its way home in 2014

In the 21st century, the Indian Navy has played an important role in maintaining peace for India on the maritime front, in spite of the state of foment in its neighbourhood. It has been deployed for humanitarian relief in times of natural disasters and crises across the globe, as well as to keep India's maritime trade routes free and open.

The Indian Navy was a part of the joint forces exercises, Operation Parakram, during the 2001–2002 India–Pakistan standoff. More than a dozen warships were deployed to the northern Arabian Sea. In October, the Indian Navy took over operations to secure the Strait of Malacca, to relieve US Navy resources for Operation Enduring Freedom.

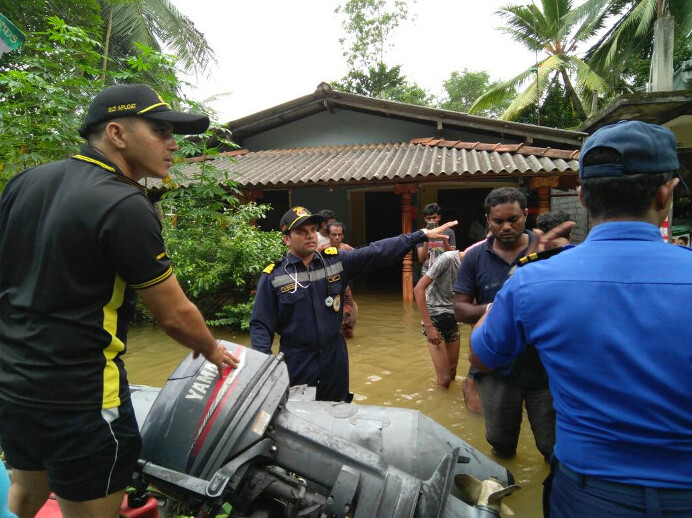
Indian Navy flood relief operations in the aftermath of floods and landslides in Sri Lanka

The navy plays an important role in providing humanitarian relief in times of natural disasters, including floods, cyclones and tsunamis. In the aftermath of the 2004 Indian Ocean earthquake and tsunami, the Indian Navy launched massive disaster relief operations to help affected Indian states as well as Maldives, Sri Lanka and Indonesia. Over 27 ships, dozens of helicopters, at least six fixed-wing aircraft and over 5000 personnel of the navy were deployed in relief operations. These included Operation Madad in Andhra Pradesh and Tamil Nadu, Operation Sea Waves in the Andaman and Nicobar Islands, Operation Castor in Maldives, Operation Rainbow in Sri Lanka and Operation Gambhir in Indonesia. Gambhir, carried out following the 2004 Indian Ocean tsunami, was one of the largest and fastest force mobilisations that the Indian Navy has undertaken. Indian naval rescue vessels and teams reached neighbouring countries less than 12 hours from the time that the tsunami hit. Lessons from the response led to decision to enhance amphibious force capabilities, including the acquisition of landing platform docks such as INS Jalashwa, as well as smaller amphibious vessels.

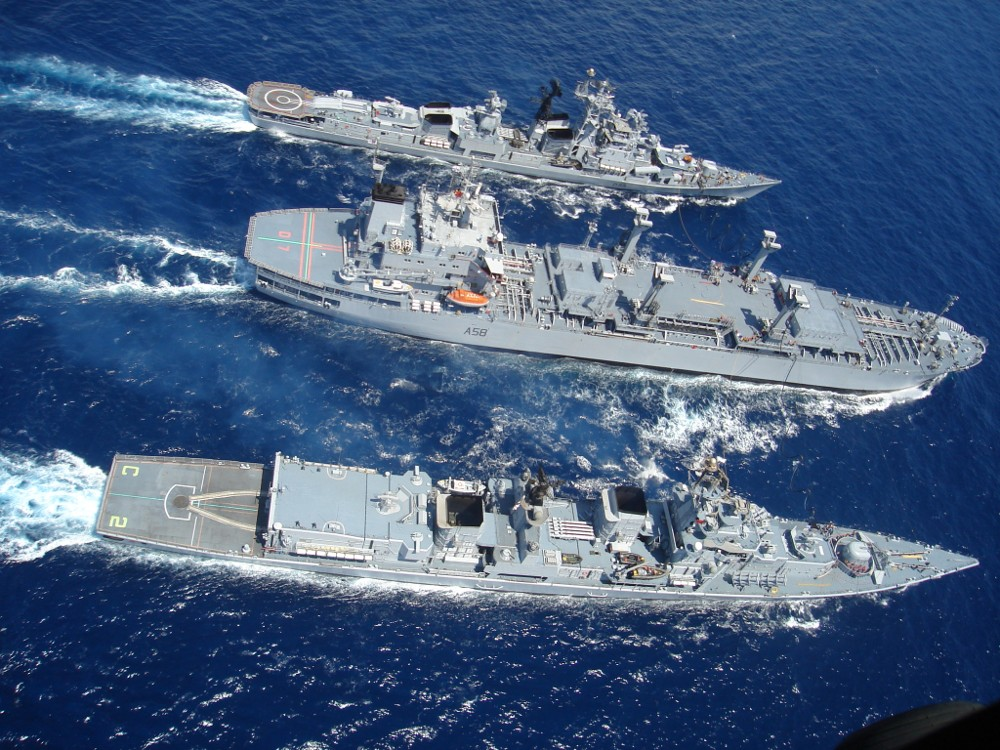
From top to bottom: INS Ranjit, INS Jyoti and INS Mysore

During the 2006 Israel-Lebanon conflict, the Indian Navy launched Operation Sukoon and evacuated 2,280 persons from 20 to 29 July 2006 including 436 Sri Lankans, 69 Nepalese and 7 Lebanese nationals from war-torn Lebanon. In 2006, Indian naval doctors served for 102 days on board USNS Mercy to conduct medical camps in the Philippines, Bangladesh, Indonesia and East Timor. In 2007, Indian Navy supported relief operations for the survivors of Cyclone Sidr in Bangladesh. In 2008, Indian Naval vessels were the first to launch international relief operations for victims of Cyclone Nargis in Myanmar. In 2008, the navy deployed INS Tabar and INS Mysore into the Gulf of Aden to combat piracy in Somalia. Tabar prevented numerous piracy attempts, and escorted hundreds of ships safely through the pirate-infested waters. The navy also undertook anti-piracy patrols near the Seychelles, upon that country's request.

During the November 2008 Mumbai terror attack, the MARCOS, a special force of the Indian Navy, fought against the terrorists from the Pakistan based terror outfit Lashkar-e-Taiba at the Taj Mahal Palace Hotel and rescued hostages. The commandos were later joined by the National Security Guard.

In February 2011, the Indian Navy launched Operation Safe Homecoming and rescued Indian nationals from war torn Libya. Between January–March, the navy launched Operation Island Watch to deter piracy attempts by Somali pirates off the Lakshadweep archipelago. This operation has had numerous successes in preventing pirate attacks. During the 2015 crisis in Yemen, the Indian Navy was part of Operation Raahat and rescued 3074 individuals of which 1291 were foreign nationals. On 15 April 2016, a Poseidon-8I long-range patrol aircraft managed to thwart a piracy attack on the high seas by flying over MV Sezai Selaha, a merchant vessel, which was being targeted by a pirate mother ship and two skiffs around 800 nautical miles (1,500 km; 920 mi) from Mumbai.

India enacted its first domestic anti-piracy legislation as the Maritime Anti-Piracy Act 2022, on 20 December 2022 criminalizing maritime piracy and empowering the Indian Navy and other government agencies with the authority to respond to threats at sea. In 2024, Chief Admiral R. Hari Kumar referred to the new law as a "great enabler" in the navy's anti-piracy success. That year, The Economic Times referred to the Indian Navy's commitment in combating maritime piracy as "unwavering".

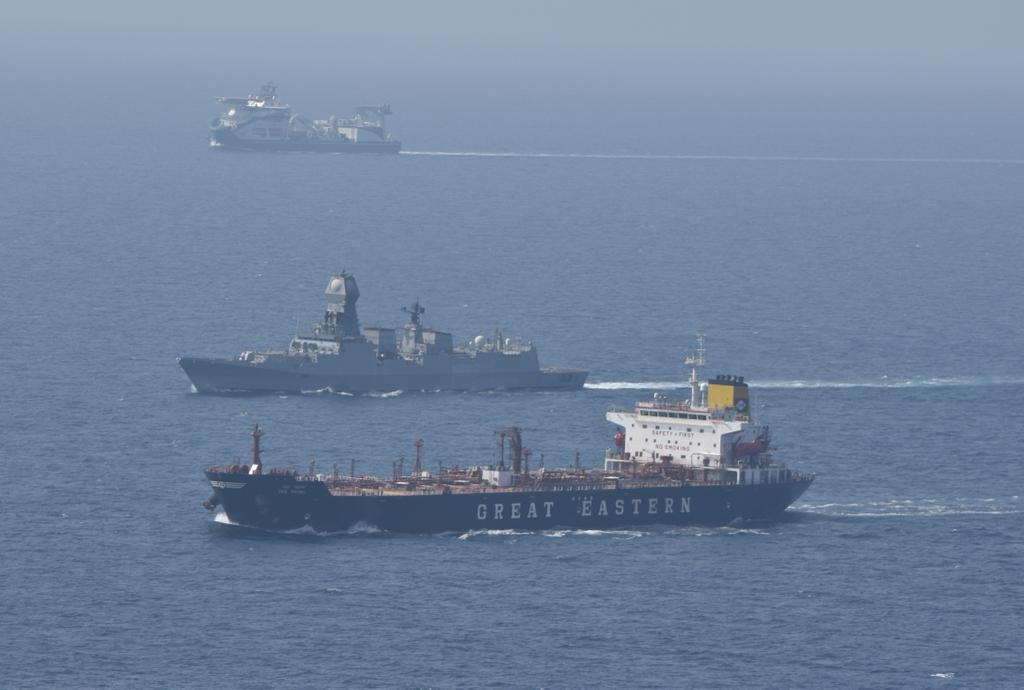
Indian Navy mission deployed in the North/Central Arabian sea and Gulf of Aden following attack on tanker Chem Pluto

In January 2024, the Indian Navy deployed over 10 warships under Operation Sankalp to protect commercial shipping in the Gulf of Aden and the Arabian Sea in the wake of Houthi-led attacks on merchant vessels. Some of the ships deployed included guided missile destroyers like the INS Kolkata, INS Kochi, INS Chennai and INS Mormugao, as well as frigates like the INS Talwar and INS Tarkash. On 5 January, the INS Chennai prevented the hijacking of the Liberian merchant vessel MV Lila Norfolk. Although India declined to join the multinational US-led Operation Prosperity Guardian, the Indian Navy continued to share information and coordinate operations with the United States, United Kingdom, and France.

In May 2024, the Navy officially replaced the terms "Jack" and "Jackstaff" with "National Flag" and "National Flag Staff". The words Jack and Jackstaff originates from the Royal Navy's traditions which implies for national flag and the short pole on the bow of the ship to host the flag in 'naval parlance', respectively.

=== Current role ===
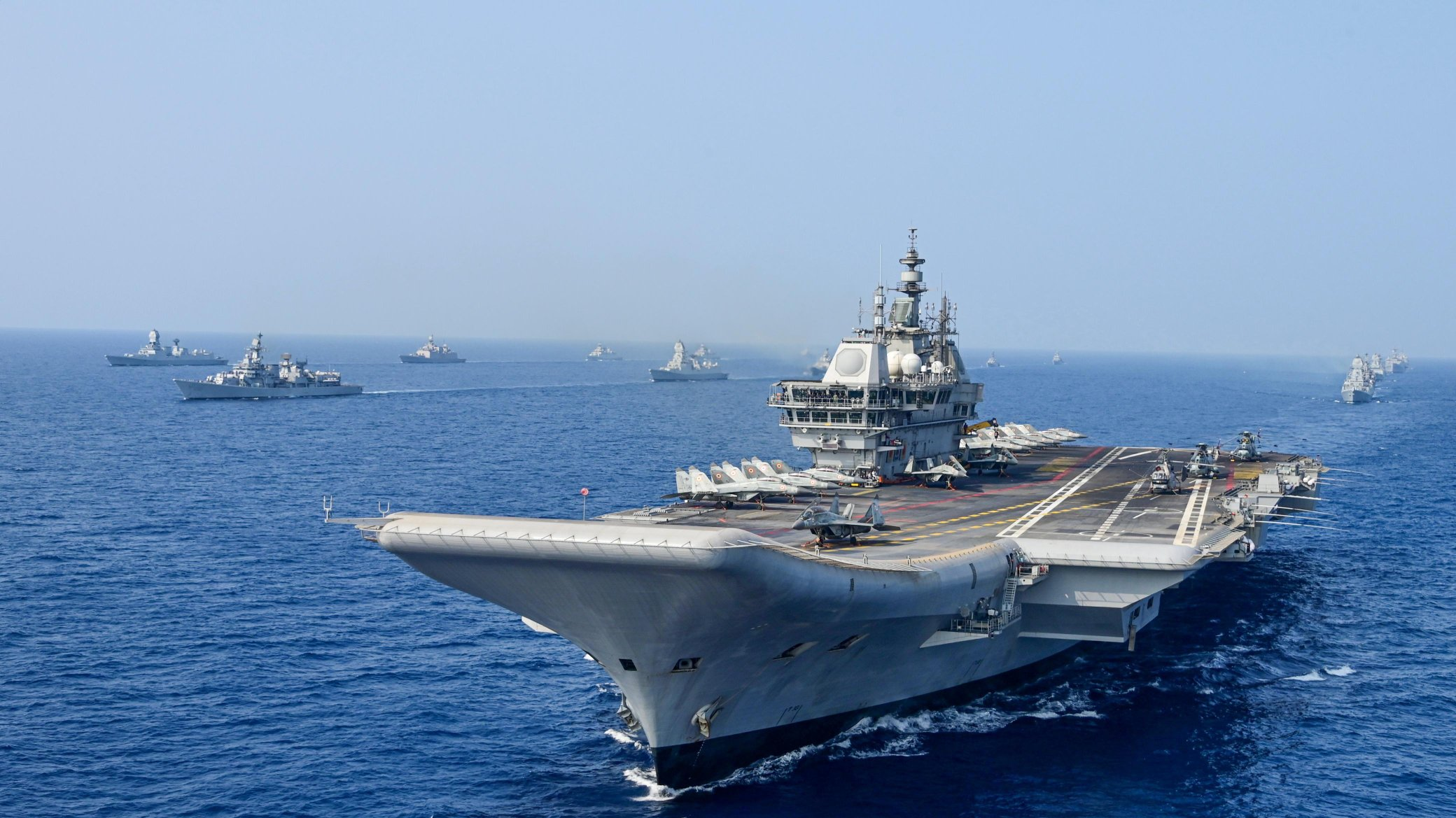
Indian Navy Carrier Battle Group deployment during Operation Sindoor

As of August 2015, the Indian Navy is classified as a Rank 3 navy (Power projection to regions adjacent to its own) on the Todd-Lindberg navy classification system of naval strength. The principal roles of the Indian Navy are:

- In conjunction with other Armed Forces of the Union, act to deter or defeat any threats or aggression against the territory, people or maritime interests of India, both in war and peace;
- Project influence in India's maritime area of interest, to further the nation's political, economic and security objectives;
- In co-operation with the Indian Coast Guard, ensure good order and stability in India's maritime zones of responsibility.
- Provide maritime assistance (including disaster relief) in India's maritime neighbourhood.

== Command and organisation ==
=== Organisation ===
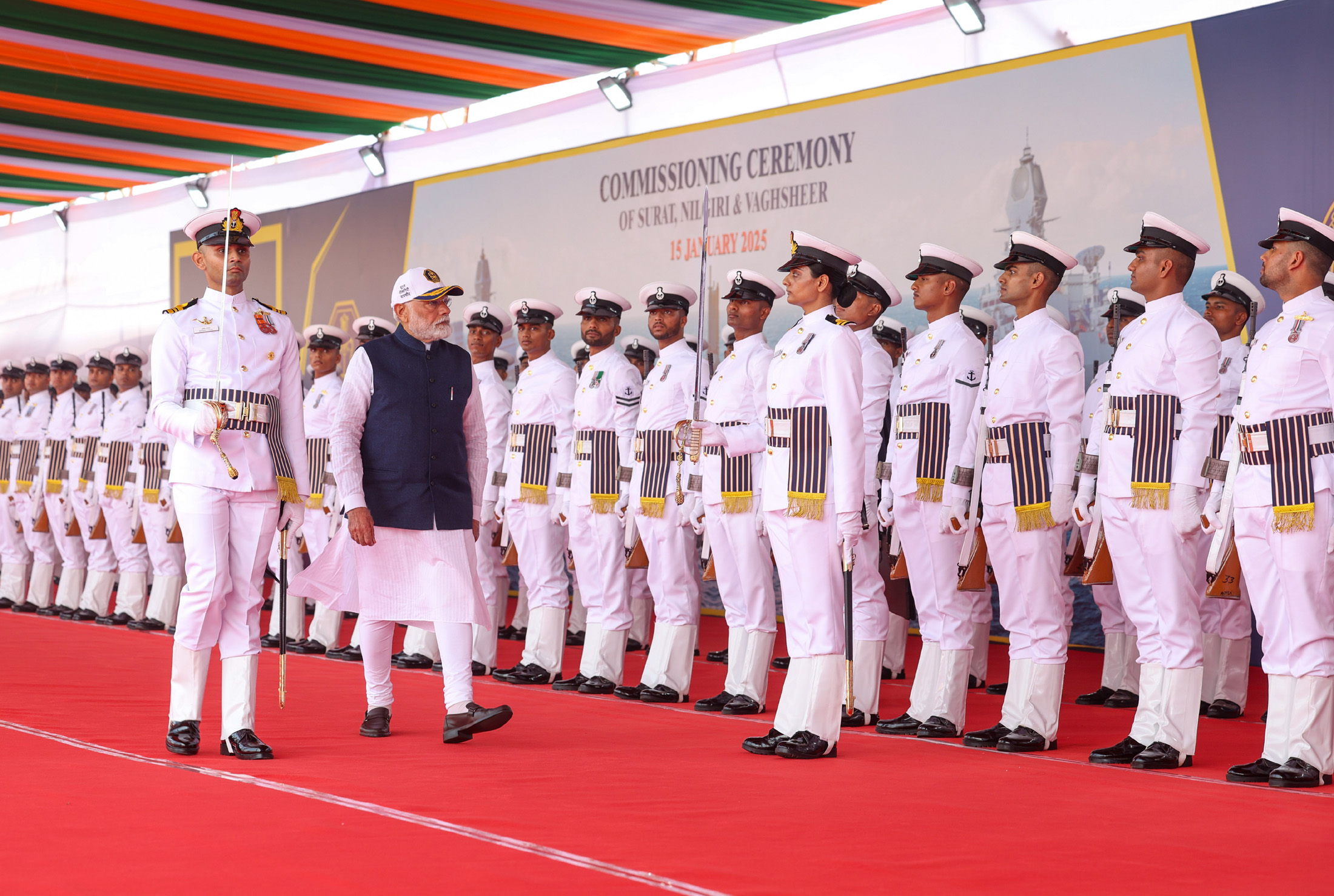
PM Narendra Modi inspects Guard of honour at the Naval Dockyard, 2025.

While the President of India serves as the Supreme Commander of the Indian Armed Forces, the organisational structure of the Indian Navy is headed by the Chief of Naval Staff (CNS), who holds the rank of Admiral. While the provision for the rank of Admiral of the Fleet exists, no officer of the Indian Navy has yet been conferred this rank. The CNS is assisted by the Vice Chief of Naval Staff (VCNS), a Vice Admiral; the CNS also heads the Integrated Headquarters (IHQ) of the Ministry of Defence (Navy), based in New Delhi. The Deputy Chief of Naval Staff (DCNS), a vice-admiral, is a Principal Staff Officer (PSO), along with the Chief of Personnel (COP) and the Chief of Materiel (COM), both of whom are also vice-admirals. The Director General Medical Services (Navy) is a Surgeon Vice-Admiral, heads the medical services of the Indian Navy.

The Indian Navy operates two operational commands and one training command. Each command is headed by a Flag Officer Commanding-in-Chief (FOC-in-C) of the rank of Vice Admiral. The Eastern and Western commands each have a Fleet commanded by a Rear Admiral. The Western Fleet based at Mumbai is commanded by the Flag Officer Commanding Western Fleet (FOCWF) and the Eastern Fleet, based at Visakhapatnam, is commanded by the Flag Officer Commanding Eastern Fleet (FOCEF). Apart from the two fleets, there is a Flotilla each, based at Mumbai, Visakhapatnam and Port Blair, that provide Local Naval Defence in their respective regions.

The Eastern and Western commands each also have a Commodore commanding submarines (COMCOS) - the Commodore Commanding Submarines (East) and the Commodore Commanding Submarines (West). The Flag Officer Naval Aviation and the Flag Officer Submarines, the single-point class authority for naval aviation and submarines are based at Visakhapatnam and Goa respectively. The Southern Naval Command is home to the Flag Officer Sea Training (FOST).

Additionally, the Andaman and Nicobar Command is a unified Indian Navy, Indian Army, Indian Air Force, and Indian Coast Guard theater command based at the capital, Port Blair. Commander-in-Chief, Andaman and Nicobar Command (CINCAN) receives staff support from, and reports directly to the Chairman Chiefs of Staff Committee (COSC) in New Delhi. The Command was set up in the Andaman and Nicobar Islands in 2001.

Post	Location	Current Holder	References
At Naval Headquarters
Chief of the Naval Staff	New Delhi	Admiral Krishna Swaminathan PVSM, AVSM, VSM	
Vice Chief of the Naval Staff	New Delhi	Vice Admiral Ajay Kochhar PVSM, AVSM, NM	
Deputy Chief of the Naval Staff	New Delhi	Vice Admiral A. N. Pramod AVSM, YSM	
Chief of Personnel	New Delhi	Vice Admiral Gurcharan Singh AVSM, NM	
Chief of Materiel	New Delhi	Vice Admiral B. Sivakumar AVSM, VSM	
At operational command level
Flag Officer Commanding-in-Chief Western Naval Command	Mumbai	Vice Admiral Sanjay Vatsayan PVSM, AVSM, NM	
Flag Officer Commanding-in-Chief Eastern Naval Command	Visakhapatnam	Vice Admiral Sanjay Bhalla AVSM, NM	
Flag Officer Commanding-in-Chief Southern Naval Command	Kochi	Vice Admiral Sameer Saxena AVSM, NM	

=== Facilities ===
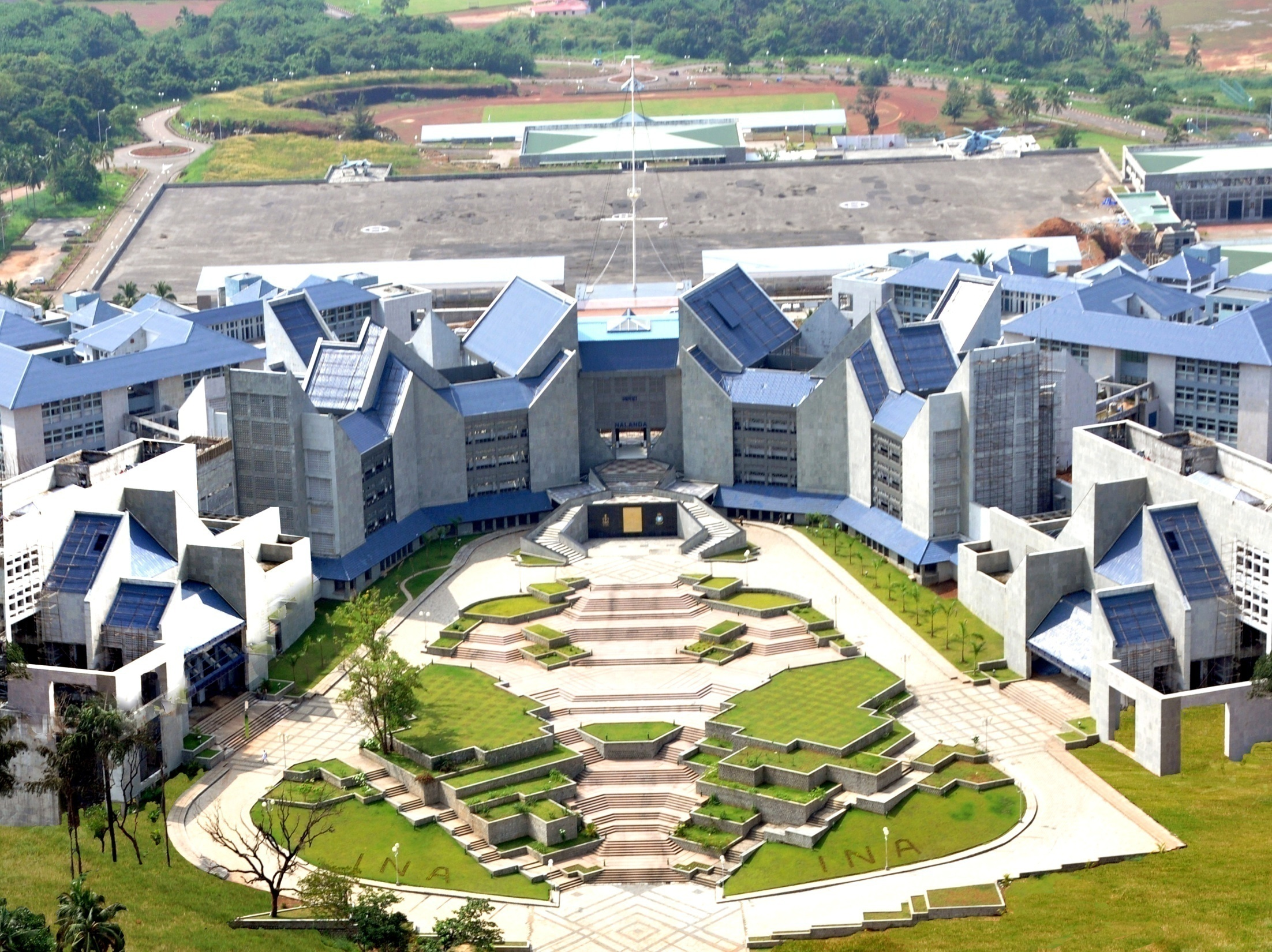
Nalanda Complex of Indian Naval Academy, the largest Naval training facility in Asia.

Indian Navy has its operational and training bases in Gujarat, Karnataka, Goa, Maharashtra, Lakshadweep, Kerala, Odisha, Tamil Nadu, Andhra Pradesh, West Bengal, and Andaman and Nicobar Islands. These bases are intended for various purposes such as logistics and maintenance support, ammunition support, air stations, hospitals, MARCOS bases, coastal defence, missile defence, submarine and missile boat bases, forward operating bases etc. Of these, INS Shivaji is one of the oldest naval bases in India. Commissioned in February 1945 as HMIS Shivaji, it now serves as the premier Technical Training Establishment (TTE) of the Indian Navy.

In May 2005, the Indian Navy commissioned INS Kadamba at Karwar, 100 kilometres (62 mi) from Goa. Built under the first phase of the Project Seabird, at first it was an exclusively Navy controlled base without sharing port facilities with commercial shipping. The Indian Navy also has berthing rights in Oman and Vietnam. The Navy operates a monitoring station, fitted with radars and surveillance gear to intercept maritime communication, in Madagascar. It also plans to build a further 32 radar stations in Seychelles, Mauritius, Maldives and Sri Lanka. According to Intelligence Online, published by a France-based global intelligence gathering organisation, Indigo Publications, the Navy is believed to be operating a listening post in Ras al-Hadd, Oman. The post is located directly across from Gwadar Port in Balochistan, Pakistan, separated by approximately 400 kilometres (250 mi) of the Arabian Sea.

The navy operates INS Kattabomman, a VLF and ELF transmission facility at Vijayanarayanapuram near Tirunelveli in Tamil Nadu. INS Abhimanyu and INS Karna are two bases dedicated for MARCOS. Project Varsha is a project undertaken by the Navy to construct a hi-tech base under the Eastern Naval Command. The base is said to house nuclear submarines and also a VLF facility.

=== Training ===
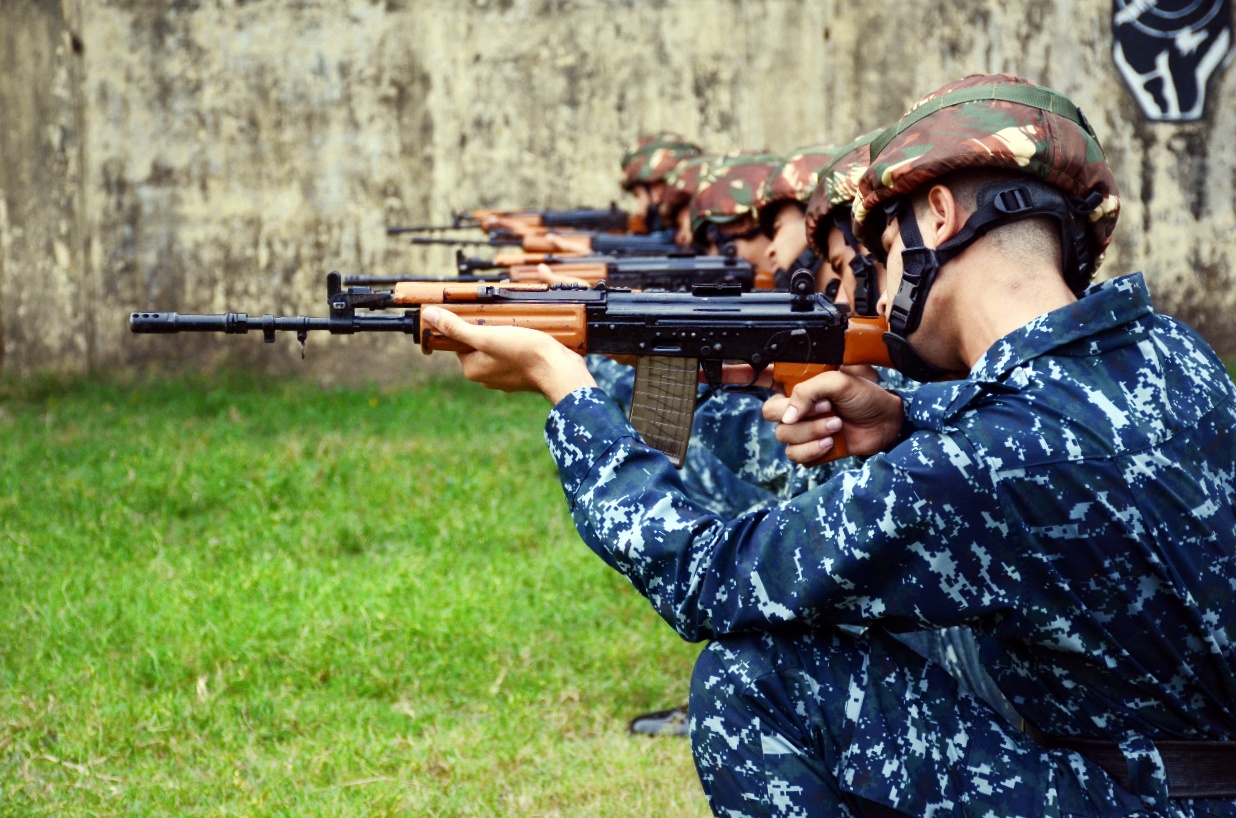
Indian Navy personnel issued with NWU Type-1 camo replacing previous "No. 10" uniform

Indian Navy has a specialized training command which is responsible for organisation, conduct and overseeing of all basic, professional and specialist training throughout the Navy. The Commander in Chief of Southern Command also serves as the Commander in Chief of Training Command. The Chief of Personnel (CoP) at HQ of Indian Navy is responsible for the framework of training and exercises the responsibility through Directorate of Naval Training (DNT). The training year of Indian Navy is defined from 1 July to 30 June of the following year.

Seaman training is held at INS Chilika, Orissa.

Officer training is conducted at Indian Naval Academy (INA) at Ezhimala, on the coast of Kerala. Established in 2009, it is the largest naval academy in Asia. Cadets from National Defence Academy also move to INA for their later terms. The Navy also has specialized training establishments for gunnery, aviation, leadership, logistics, music, medicine, physical training, educational training, engineering, hydrography, submarines etc. at several naval bases along the coastline of India. Naval officers also attend the tri-service institutions National Defence College, College of Defence Management and Defence Services Staff College for various staff courses to higher command and staff appointments. The Navy's War college is the Naval War College, Goa. A dedicated wing for naval architecture under Directorate of Naval Architecture at IIT Delhi is operated by the Navy. Indian Navy also trains officers and men from the navies of friendly foreign countries.

=== MARCOS ===
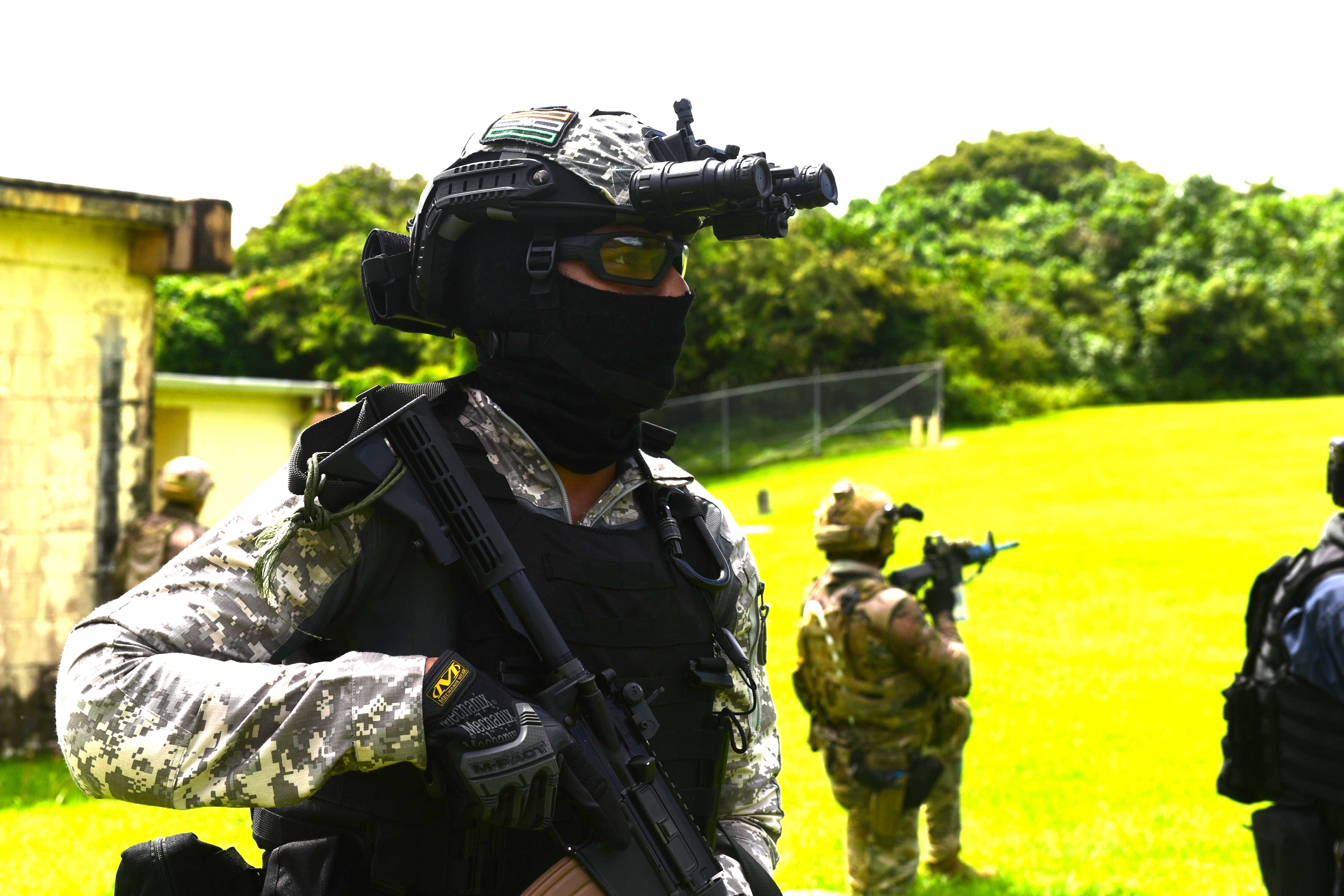
A Marine Commando during urban combat training at Malabar 2021.

The Marine Commando Force (MCF), also known as MARCOS, is a special operations unit that was raised by the Indian Navy in 1987 for Amphibious warfare, Close Quarter Combat Counter-terrorism, Direct action, Special reconnaissance, Unconventional warfare, Hostage rescue, Personnel recovery, Combat search and rescue, Asymmetric warfare, Foreign internal defence, Counterproliferation, Amphibious reconnaissance including Hydrographic reconnaissance. Since their inception MARCOS proved themselves in various operations and wars, notable of them include Operation Pawan, Operation Cactus, UNOSOM II, Kargil War and Operation Black Tornado. They are also actively deployed on anti-piracy operations throughout the year.

== Rank structure ==
Strength of the Indian Navy
1. Artificers 7,914 (10.7%)
2. Officers 10,169 (13.8%)
3. Non-Artificers 55,786 (75.5%)

As of 1 June 2019, the Navy has 10,012 officers and 57,240 sailors against a sanctioned strength of 11,557 officers and 74,046 sailors. This strength is inclusive of personnel from Naval Air Arm, Marine Commando Force and Sagar Prahari Bal and exclusive of personnel from Armed Forces Medical Services. The total strength of the Indian Navy, comprising 10,169 officers and 57,786 sailors, was formally presented by the Government of India, Ministry of Defence, Department of Military Affairs, and submitted in the Lok Sabha through an unstarred question to be answered on a specified date (document details partially obscured). This information, provided by the Minister of Defence, reflects the borne strength as of 31 December 2021, and represents the latest official data available from this source as of 02:10 PM IST on Friday, 1 August 2025.

Strength of the Indian Navy
Pay level	Rank	Borne Strength (status as on 31 December 2021)
Officers (except Indian Navy Medical Service officers)
18	Admiral	1
17/16/15	Vice Admiral	23
14	Rear Admiral	71
13A/13	Commodore & Captain	919
—N/a	Commander and below	9155
Total	—N/a	10169
Artificers
9/8	MCERA I	349
7	MCERA II	1211
6	ERA III (Chief Artificer)	1366
5/4	ERA IV/V	4988
Total	—N/a	7914
Non-Artificer
8	MCPO I	970
7	MCPO II	1356
6	CPO	2504
5	PO	11342
4/3	Leading Seaman and below	39614
Total	—N/a	55786
GRAND TOTAL	—N/a	73,869

=== Officers ===
India uses the Midshipman rank in its navy, and all future officers carry the rank upon entering the Indian Naval Academy. They are commissioned Sub-lieutenants upon finishing their course of study.

While the provision for the rank of Admiral of the Fleet exists, it is primarily intended for major wartime use and honour. No officer of the Indian Navy has yet been conferred this rank. Both the Army and Air Force have had officers who have been conferred with the equivalent rank – Field Marshals Sam Manekshaw and K.M Cariappa of the Army and Marshal of the Indian Air Force Arjan Singh.

The highest ranked naval officer in organisation structure is the Chief of Naval Staff, who holds the rank of admiral.

Rank group	General / flag officers				Senior officers			Junior officers
Indian Navy
Indian Navy	Admiral एडमिरल	Vice admiral वाइस एडमिरल	Rear admiral रियर एडमिरल	Commodore कमोडोर	Captain कैप्टन	Commander कमांडर	Lieutenant commander लेफ़्टिनेंट कमांडर	Lieutenant लेफ्टिनेंट	Sub-lieutenant सब लेफ्टिनेंट	Midshipman मिडशिपमैन

=== Rating personnel ===
In the Indian Navy, the sailors are initially listed as, Seaman 2nd class. As they grow through the ranks they attain the highest rank of enlisted personnel, Master chief petty officer 1st class. Sailors who possess leadership qualities and fulfill requisite conditions in terms of education, age etc. may be commissioned through Commission worthy and Special Duties (CW & SD) scheme.

Rank group	Junior commissioned officers			Non commissioned officer		Enlisted
Indian Navy						No insignia
Indian Navy	Master chief petty officer I मास्टर चीफ पेटी ऑफिसर फर्स्ट क्लास	Master chief petty officer II मास्टर चीफ पेटी ऑफिसर सेकेंड क्लास	Chief petty officer चीफ पेटी ऑफिसर	Petty officer पेटी ऑफिसर	Leading Seaman लीडिंग सीमैन	Seaman I सीमैन फर्स्ट क्लास	Seaman II सीमैन सेकंड क्लास

=== Navy MCPO ===
Indian Navy has appointed Rajendra Kumar Behera MCPO I as the first Navy MCPO on 1 May 2022.

== Recruitment and training ==
=== Officers ===
Officers in the navy are broadly inducted through two commission categories — Short service commission and Permanent commission. A Permanent Commission (PC) in the navy means you can serve a full career until retirement, usually up to 60 years of age or a minimum of 20 years of service for officers. In contrast, a Short Service Commission (SSC) is for a fixed term, generally 10 years, extendable up to 14 years. After completing SSC, officers can be upgraded to PC, or get discharged from service. PC officers enjoy long term benefits such as CSD, pension, ECHS, etc; while SSC officers are not eligible for pension.

==== Permanent commission ====
To be eligible for the National Defence Academy and Naval Academy Examination, the candidates must have taken Physics and Mathematics at their 10+2 level. Additionally, the candidates are required to be physically fit and sound, along with no medical ailments. Through the NDA/NA examination, candidates, the navy offers two streams to candidates — NDA Navy and INA (4-year) program.

Candidates opting for the NDA Navy course go through training at National Defence Academy for three years, along with NDA Army and Air Force cadets. Afterwards, the candidates are moved to Indian Naval Academy for specialised training in naval warfare, maritime law, naval operations, gunnery, etc. After the successful completion of training, the candidates are awarded a B.Sc degree and are commissioned as Sub-Lieutenants in general executive branch.

The selection process of candidates for the INA 4-year program is identical to NDA Navy, but the candidates do not train through NDA in this stream. The candidates directly join Indian Naval Academy (INA) for 4 years of integrated B.Tech and naval training. The candidates are offered various engineering specialisations such as electrical and electronics engineering (EE/ETE), mechanical engineering, marine engineering, naval Architecture and aeronautical engineering. Upon completion of training the candidates are awarded a Jawaharlal Nehru University-affiliated Bachelor of Technology degree in their specialised stream and are commissioned as Sub-Lieutenants in engineering or architectural branch.

Medical officers in the Indian Navy are inducted primarily through the Armed Forces Medical College (AFMC), via the NEET (UG) examination, followed by AFMC-specific medical and selection assessments. Eligibility for entry into naval medical service requires candidates to have opted Physics, Chemistry, and Biology or Biotechnology at the 10+2 level, with a minimum of 60% marks in each subject. Selected candidates undergo integrated medical and military training at AFMC, where they complete the Bachelor of Medicine, Bachelor of Surgery (MBBS) programme, followed by a one-year compulsory internship, typically conducted at a naval hospital. Upon successful completion of MBBS (4.5 years) and internship (1 year), candidates are commissioned as officers with the rank of Lieutenant in the Indian Navy.

== Naval Air Arm ==
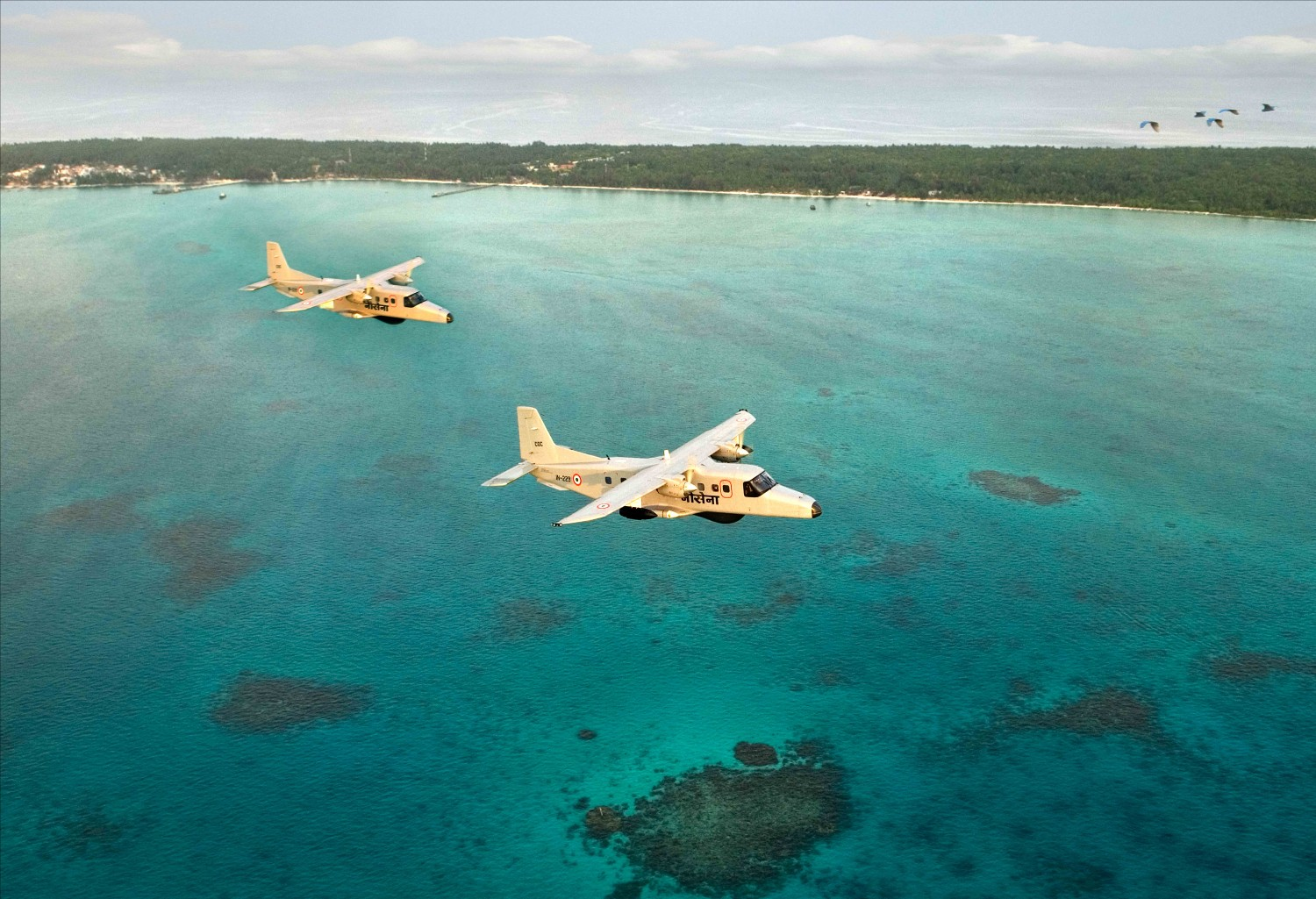
Indian Navy Dornier 228 flying over Island territory.

The naval air-arm of the Indian Navy currently operates twenty-one air squadrons. Of these, ten operate fixed-wing aircraft, eight are helicopter squadrons and the remaining three are equipped with unmanned aerial vehicles (UAV). Building on the legacy inherited from the Royal Navy prior to Indian independence, the concept of naval aviation in India started with the establishment of Directorate of Naval Aviation at Naval Headquarters (NHQ) in early 1948. Later that year officers and sailors from the Indian Navy were sent to Britain for pilot training. In 1951, the Fleet Requirement Unit (FRU) was formed to meet the aviation requirements of the navy.

On 1 January 1953, the charge of Cochin airfield was handed over to the navy from the Directorate General of Civil Aviation. On 11 March, the FRU was commissioned at Cochin with ten newly acquired Sealand aircraft. The navy's first air station, INS Garuda, was commissioned two months later. From February 1955 to December 1958, ten Firefly aircraft were acquired. To meet the training requirements of the pilots, the indigenously developed HAL HT-2 trainer was inducted into the FRU. On 17 January 1959, the FRU was commissioned as Indian Naval Air Squadron (INAS) 550, to be the first Indian naval air squadron.

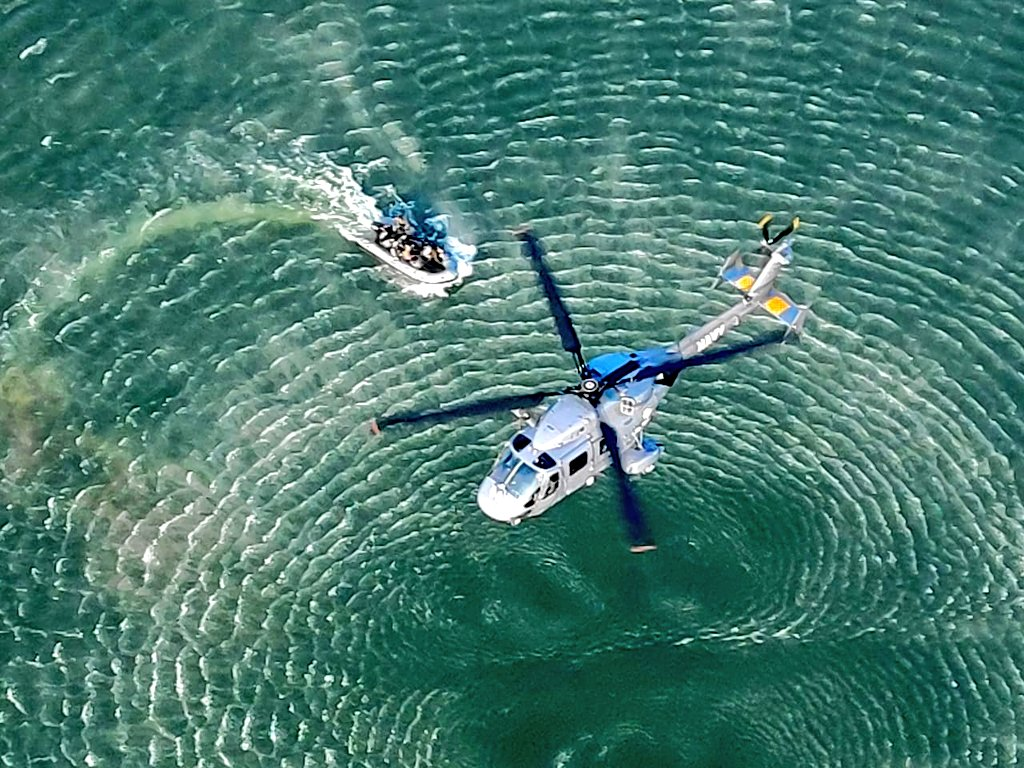
HAL Dhruv during special operation

Currently the air arm operates an aircraft carrier INS Vikramaditya with ability to carry over thirty aircraft including MiG 29K, Kamov 31, Kamov 28, Sea King and domestic-built HAL-Dhruv and Chetak helicopters. The Kamov-31 choppers also provide the airborne early warning cover for the fleet. In the anti-submarine role, the Sea King, Ka-28, and the domestic built HAL Dhruv are used. The MARCOS also use Sea King and HAL Dhruv helicopters while conducting operations. Maritime patrol and reconnaissance operations are carried out by the Boeing P-8 Poseidon and the Ilyushin 38. Indian Navy is also procuring 24 Lockheed Martin MH-60R Multi Role Helicopters under the foreign military sales from the US.

The UAV arm consists of the IAI Heron and Searcher-IIs that are operated from both surface ships and shore establishments for surveillance missions.

The Indian Navy also maintains an aerobatic display team, the Sagar Pawan. The Sagar Pawan team will be replacing their present Kiran HJT-16 aircraft with the newly developed HJT-36 aircraft.

== Equipment ==
=== Ships ===
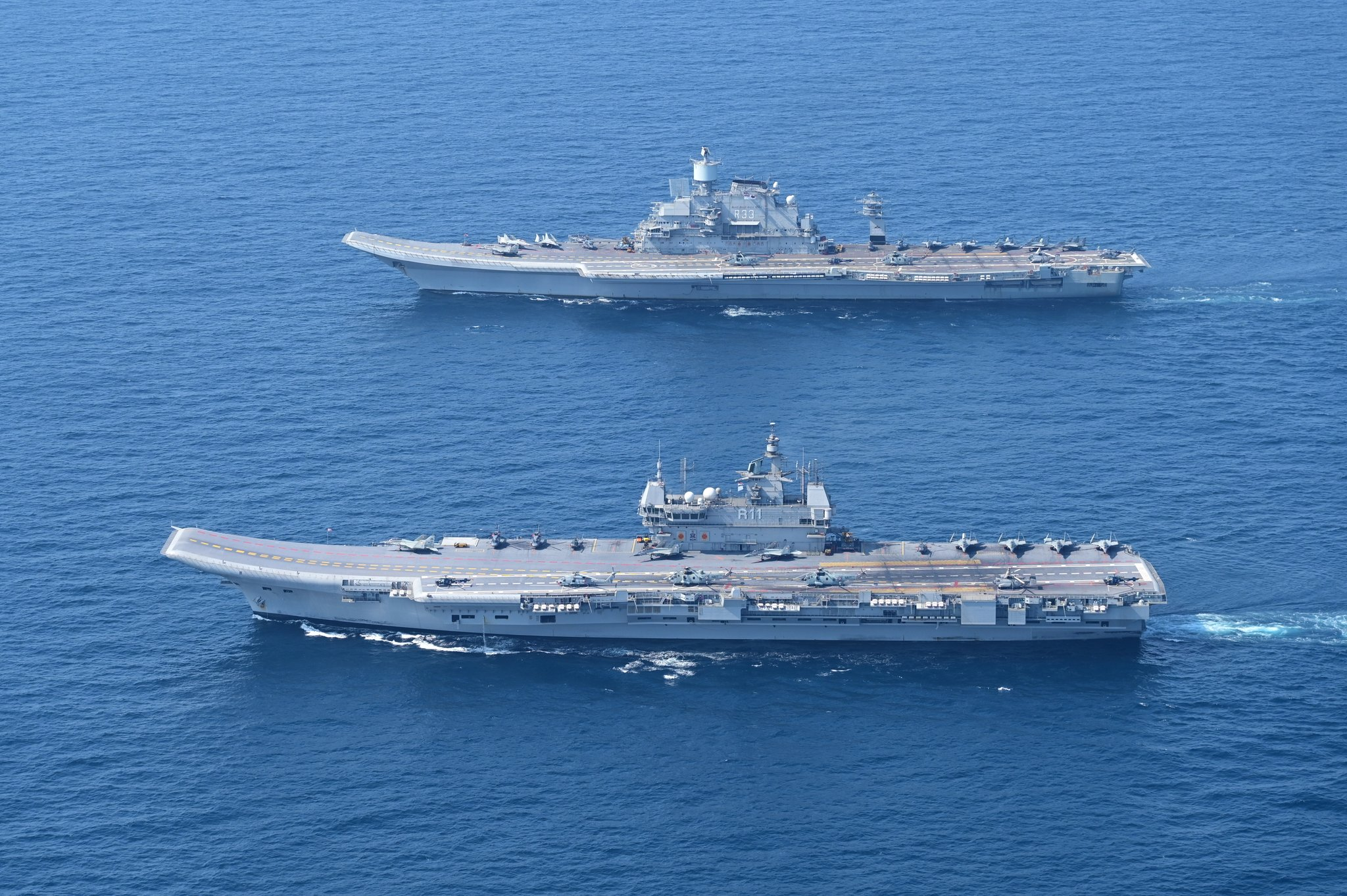
Aircraft carriers INS Vikramaditya and INS Vikrant

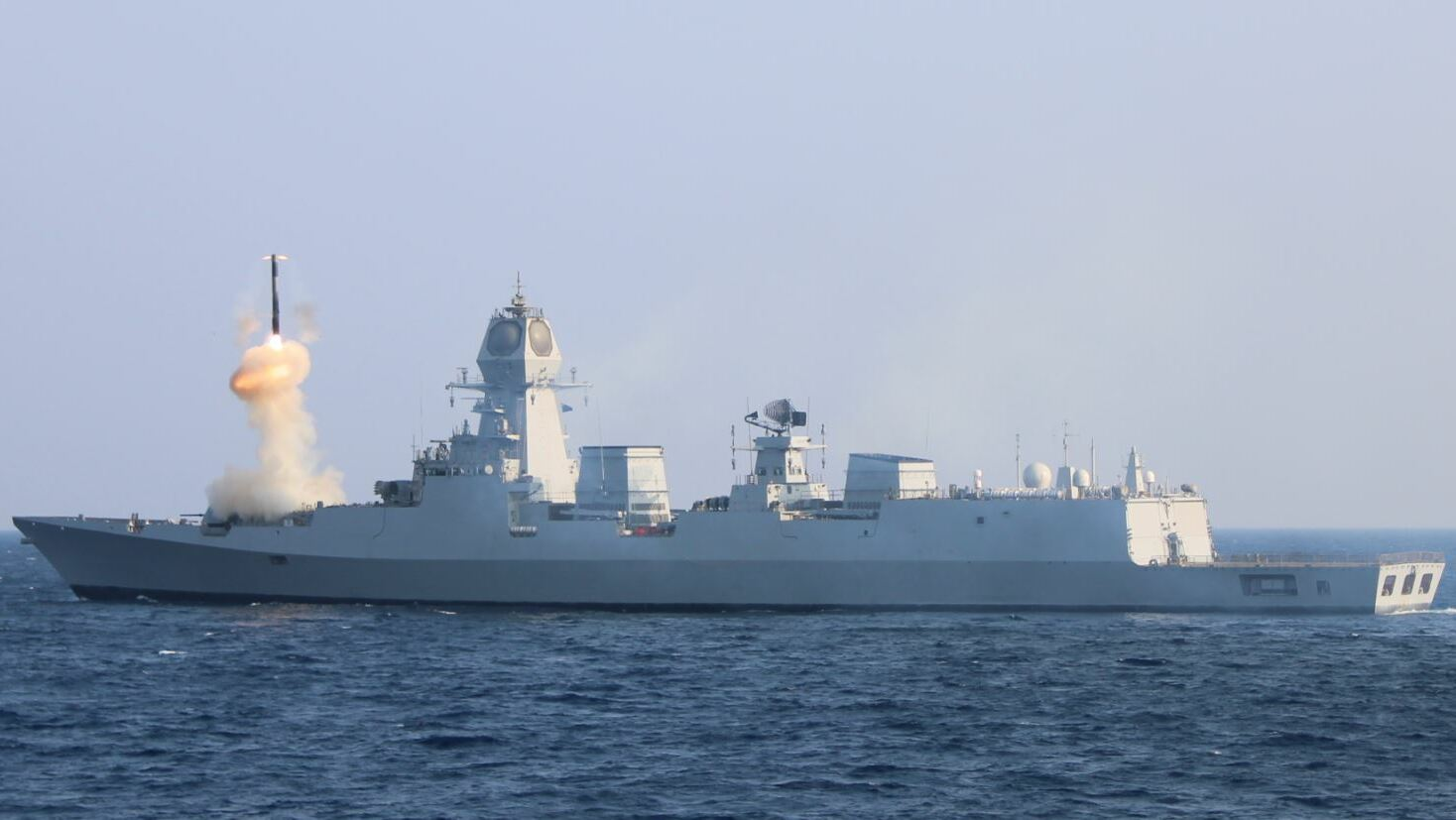
INS Imphal (D68) firing BrahMos Extended Range supersonic cruise missile.

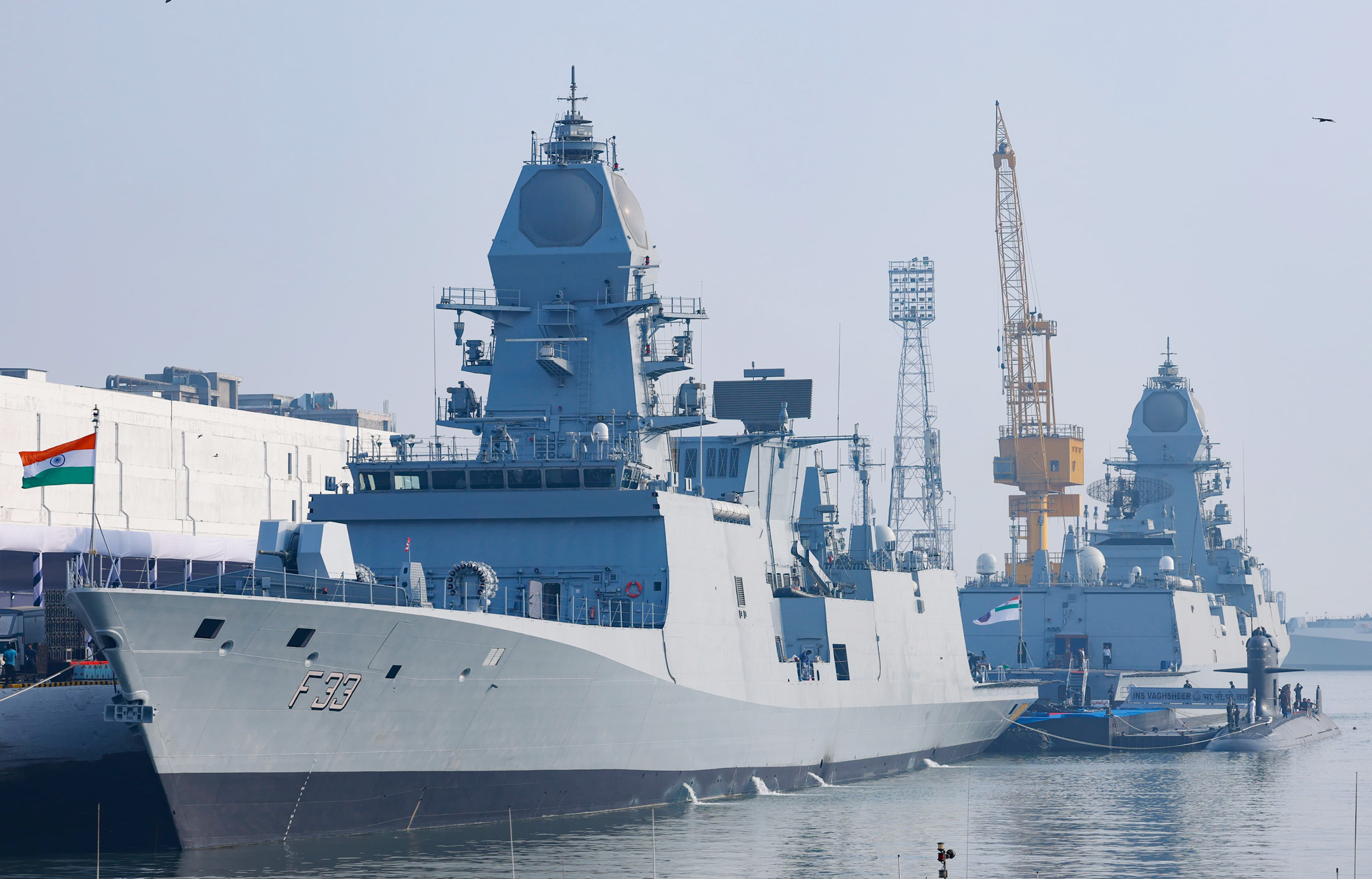
Glimpses of commissioning of three frontline naval combatants - INS Surat, INS Nilgiri and INS Vaghsheer

The names of all in service ships and naval bases of the Indian Navy are prefixed with the letters INS, designating Indian Naval Ship or Indian Navy Station, whereas the sail boats are prefixed with INSV (Indian Naval Sailing Vessel). The fleet of the Indian Navy is a mixture of domestic built and foreign vessels, as of May 2025, the surface fleet comprises 2 aircraft carriers, 1 amphibious transport dock, 4 landing ship tanks, 13 destroyers, 15 frigates, 20 corvettes, 10 large offshore patrol vessels, 4 fleet tankers, 7 Survey ships, 1 research vessel, 3 training vessels and various auxiliary vessels, Landing Craft Utility vessels, and small patrol boats.

The Navy has two aircraft carriers in active service, one of which is the INS Vikramaditya, which serves as the flagship of the fleet. Vikramaditya (formerly Admiral Gorshkov) is a modified Kiev-class aircraft carrier procured at a total cost $2.3 billion from Russia in December 2013. A second aircraft carrier, the indigenously built INS Vikrant was commissioned on 2 September 2022. The Navy has an amphibious transport dock of the Austin class, renamed as INS Jalashwa in Indian service. It also maintains a fleet of landing ship tanks.

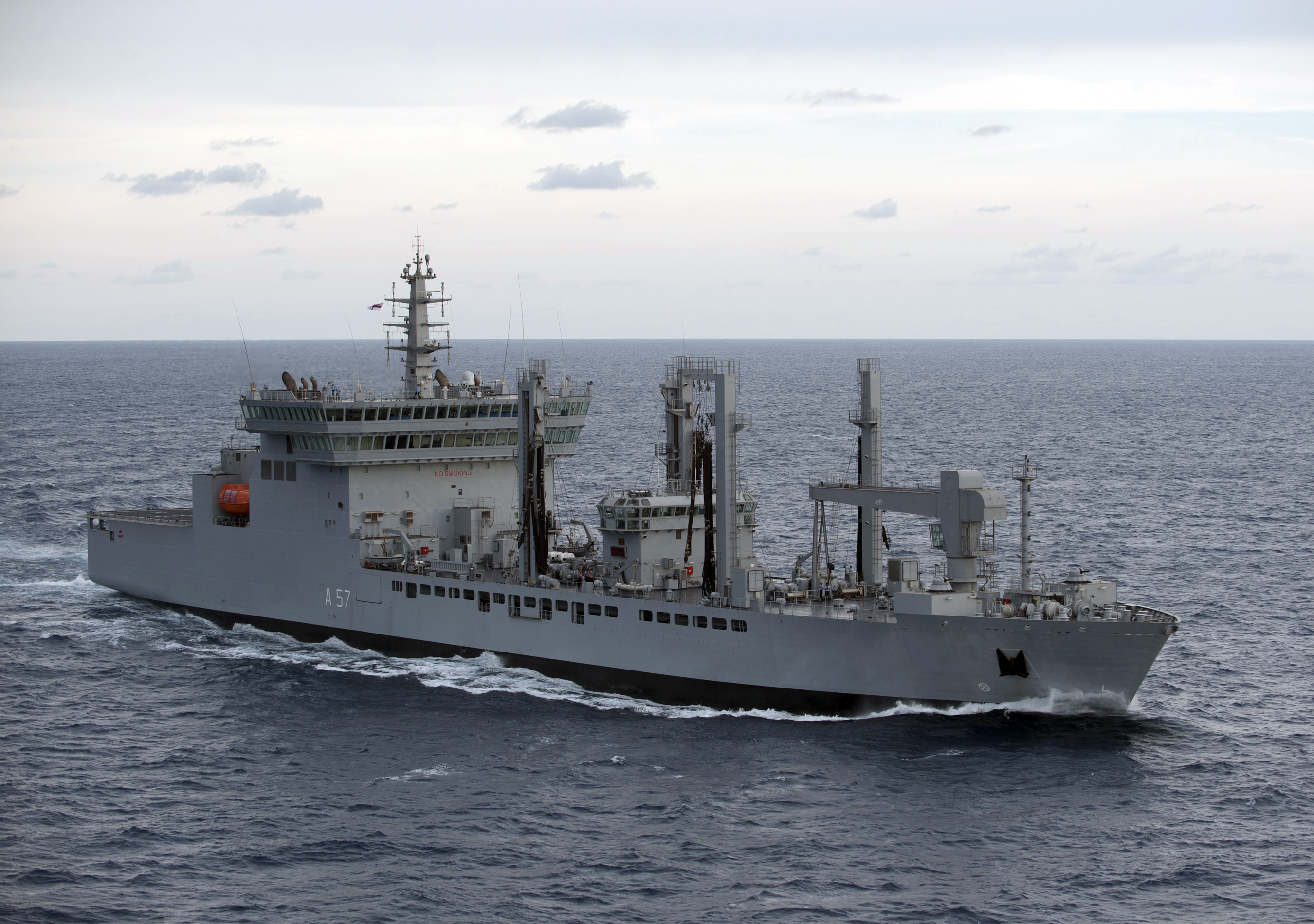
INS Shakti, a Deepak-class fleet tanker

The navy currently operates four Visakhapatnam, three Kolkata, three Delhi and three Rajput-class guided-missile destroyers. The ships of the Rajput class are being replaced by the next-generation Visakhapatnam-class destroyers (Project 15B) which feature a number of improvements.

In addition to destroyers, the navy operates several classes of frigates such as three Shivalik (Project 17 class) and six Talwar-class frigates,three Nilgiri-class and Brahmaputra-class frigate, Smaller littoral zone combatants in service are in the form of corvettes, of which the Indian Navy operates the Kamorta, Kora, Khukri, Veer and Abhay-class corvettes. Replenishment tankers such as the Jyoti-class tanker, INS Aditya and the new Deepak-class fleet tanker help improve the navy's endurance at sea.

==== Submarines ====
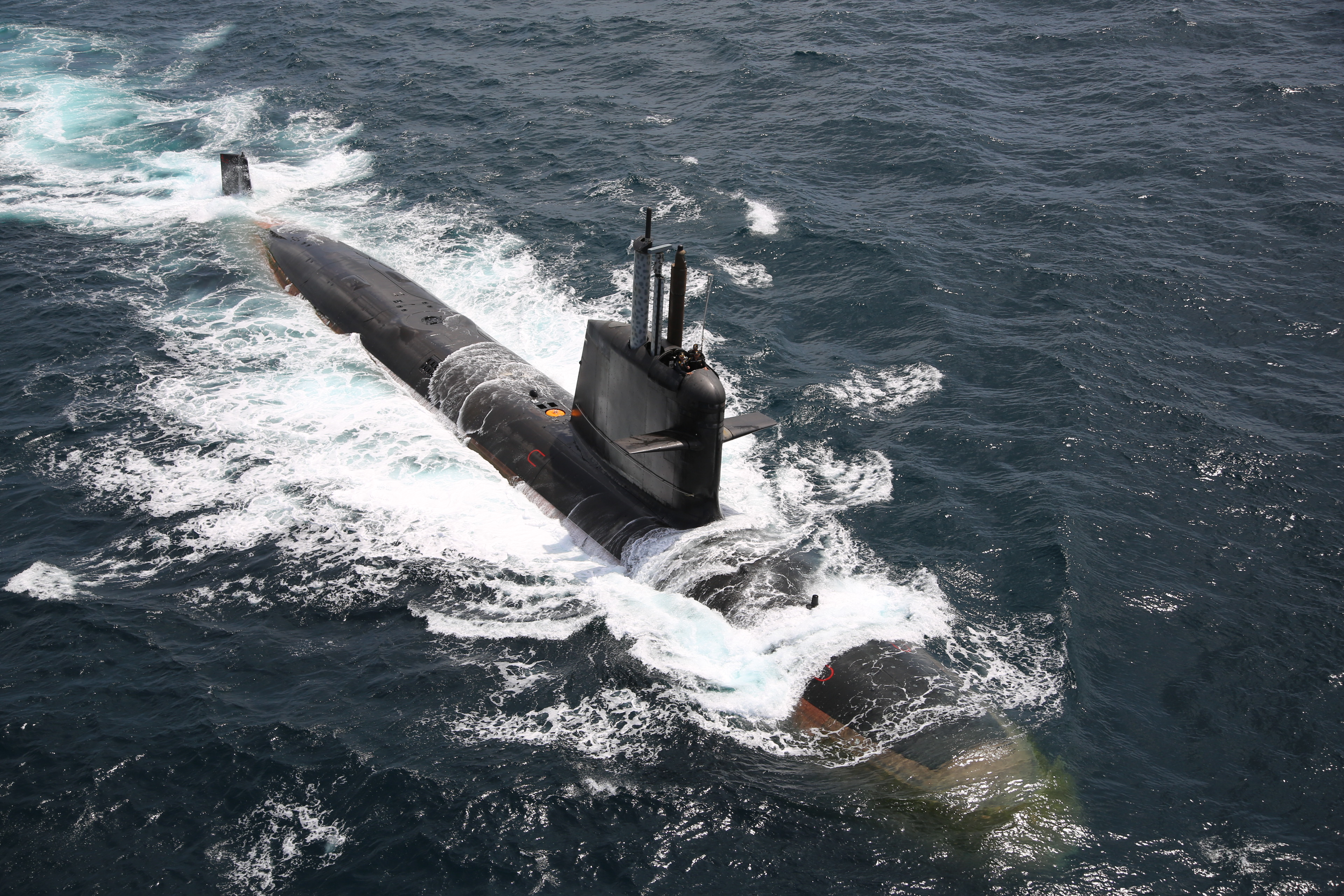
INS Kalvari, conventional submarine of the Indian Navy

As of August 2024, the Navy's sub-surface fleet includes three Arihant-class SSBN 17 conventionally-powered attack submarines. The conventional attack submarines of the Indian Navy consist of six Kalvari (French Scorpène-class submarine design), seven Sindhughosh (Russian Kilo-class submarine design), and the four Shishumar (German Type 209/1500 design) classes.

India previously possessed a single Akula-class nuclear-powered attack submarine named INS Chakra. She was leased to India for a period of ten years, between 2012 and 2021. Three hundred Indian Navy personnel were trained in Russia for the operation of these submarines. Negotiations are on with Russia for the lease of the second Akula-class submarine.

INS Arihant was launched on 26 July 2009 in Visakhapatnam, and was secretly commissioned into active service in August 2016. The Navy plans to have six nuclear-powered ballistic missile submarines in service in the near future. Arihant is both the first boat of the Arihant-class nuclear-powered ballistic missile submarines and the first nuclear-powered submarine to be built in India.

India is planning to entirely modernise its submarine fleet. Initially, it was planned that 24 conventionally powered attack submarine would be acquired. First 12 submarines (6 Project 75 and 6 Project 75I) would be inducted by 2012 and the next 12 indigenous Project 76 submarines would be inducted by 2030. However, this was revised in 2015. Now, the planned numbers stand at 4 SSBNs, 6 SSNs and 18 conventionally powered attack submarines. The clearance for Project 75 Alpha submarines was approved by the Government on 18 February 2024. As of January 2026, the Navy's planned acquisitions of submarines include :–

- Nuclear-powered, ballistic missile submarine
  - 2 Arihant-class submarines — Both undergoing sea trials.
  - 2 S5-class submarines — Under construction; at least 4 planned.
- Nuclear-powered, attack submarine
  - 2 Project 77-class submarines — Design phase; 6 planned.
  - INS Chakra III — One to be leased by 2028.
- Diesel-electric, attack submarine
  - 3 Kalvari-class submarine — Batch II proposed. Project might not proceed.
  - 6 Project 75I-class — Contract negotiations complete.
  - 6–12 Project 76 submarines — Design phase.

=== Aircraft ===
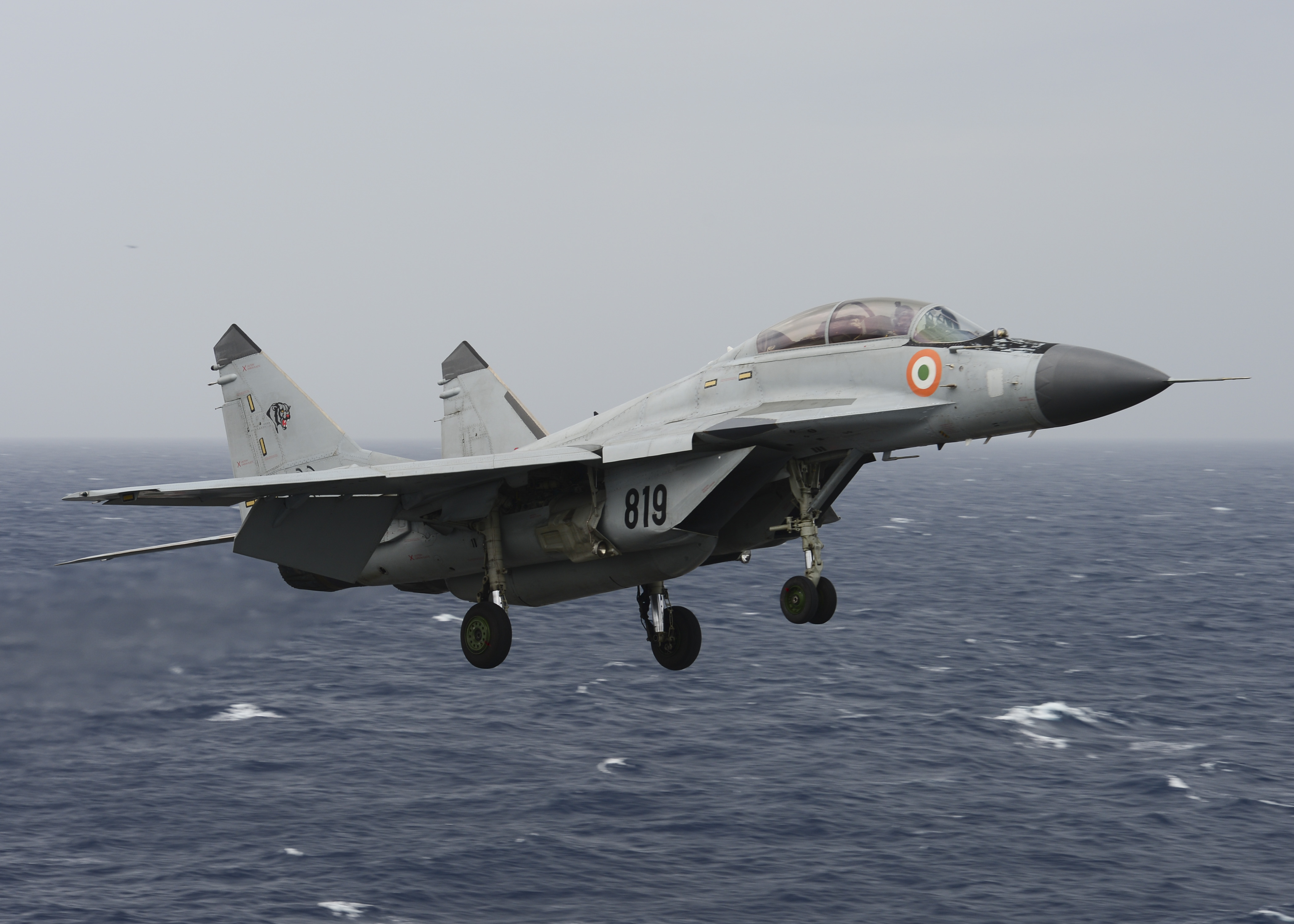
MiG-29K operates from aircraft carriers

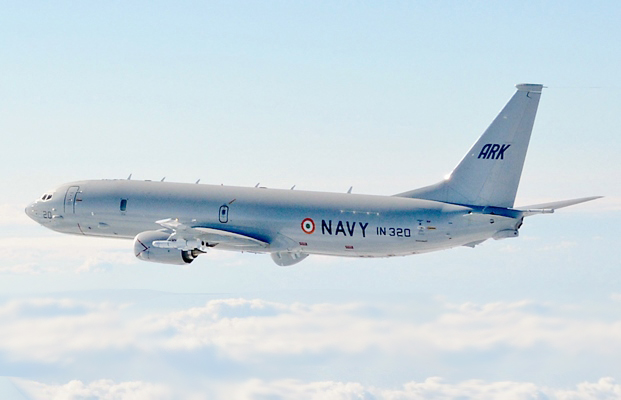
Boeing P-8I maritime patrol aircraft armed with the AGM-84 Harpoon

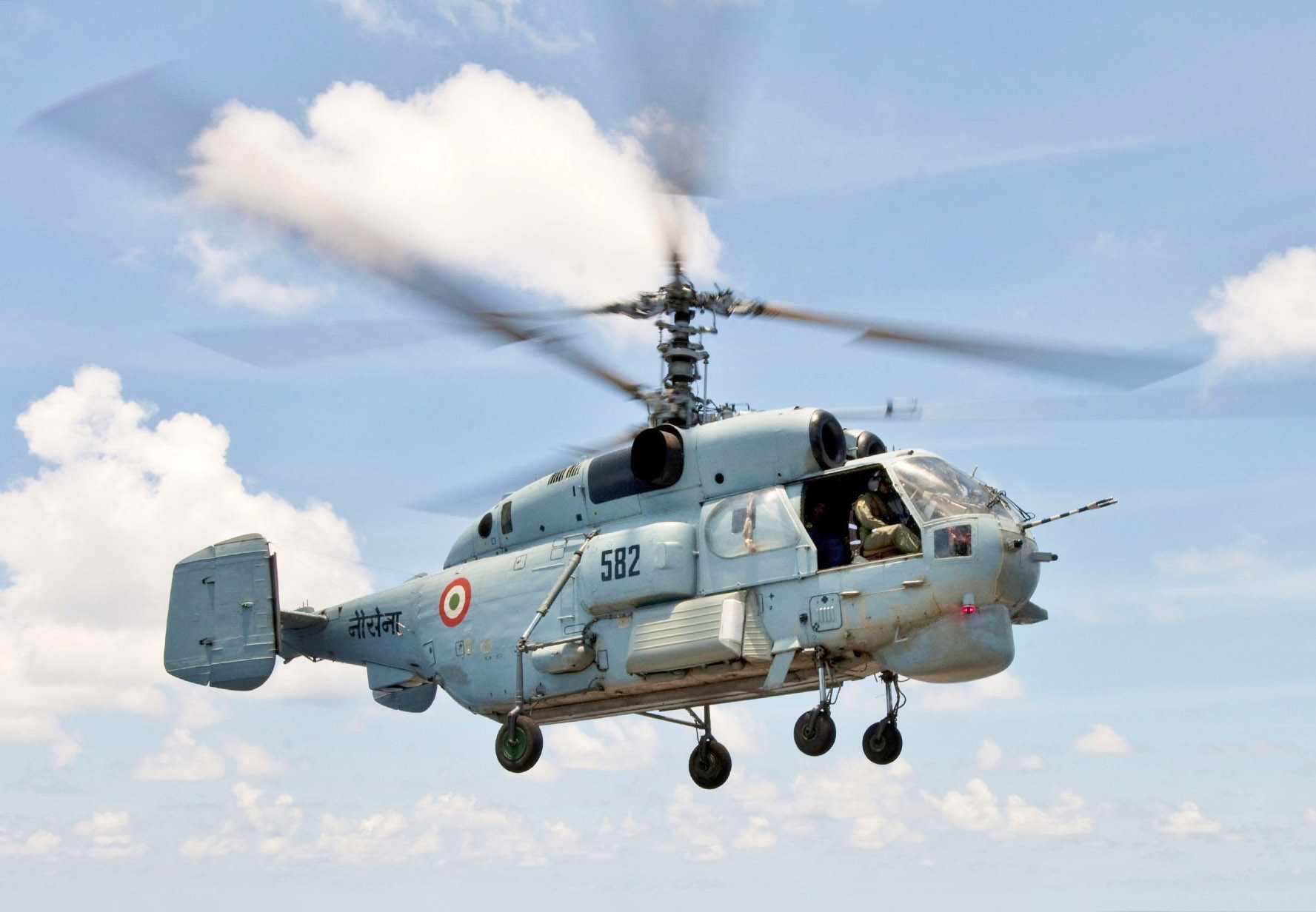
Kamov Ka-31 naval helicopter

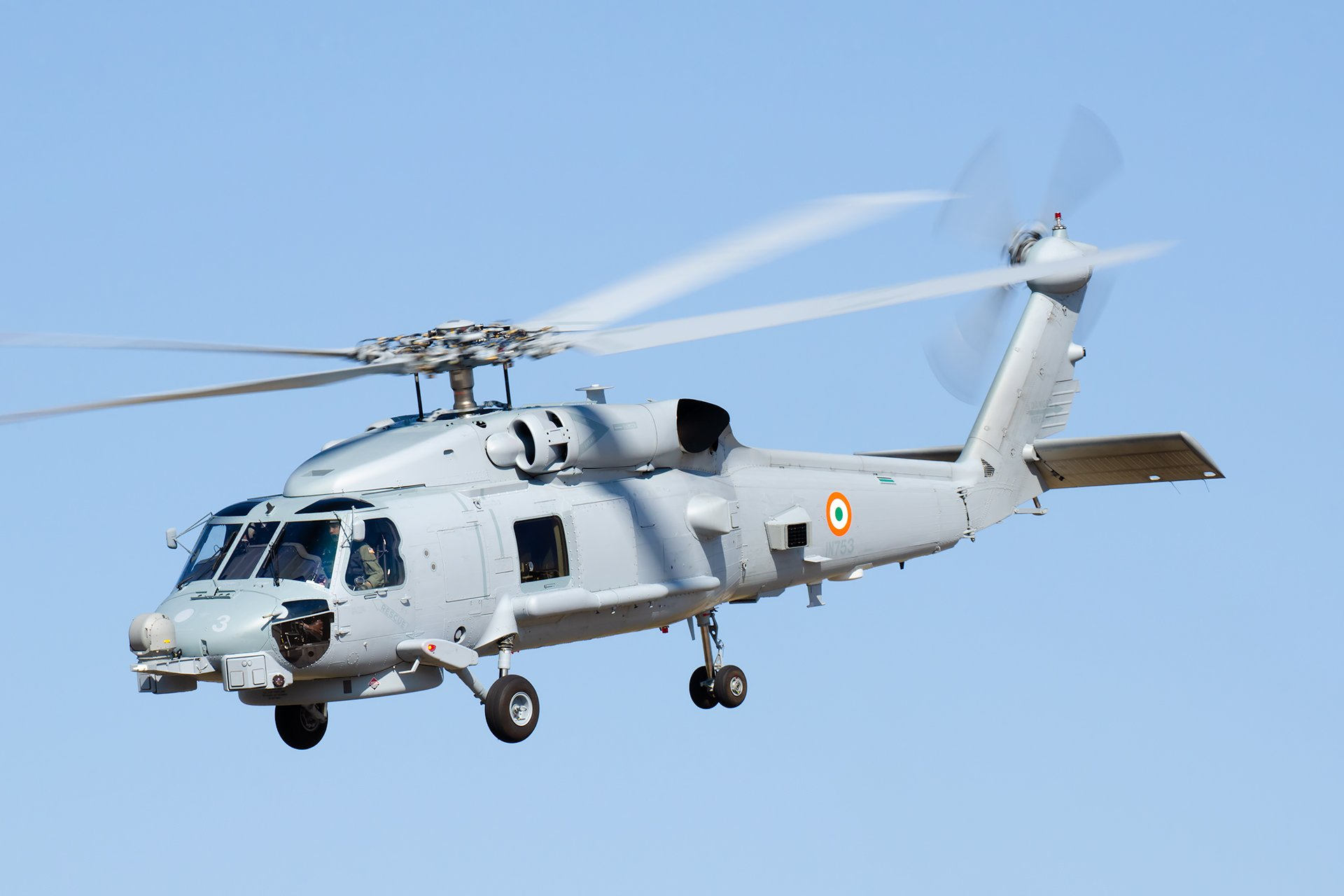
Sikorsky MH-60R Seahawk naval helicopter

The air arm of the Indian Navy was established in 1948. The navy operates 26 air squadrons stationed across eight naval air stations that operate under the flag officers of the various naval commands. The air arm maintains a fleet of combat and maritime patrol aircraft, various helicopters, and unmanned aerial vehicles.

Aircraft	Origin	Type	Variant	In service	Notes
Combat
Dassault Rafale	France	Multirole	Rafale M	–	26 (22 single-seat and four twin-seat) on order
Mikoyan MiG-29K	Russia	Multirole	MiG-29K	34	
Mikoyan MiG-29K	Russia	Multirole	MiG-29KUB	6	Two seater
Patrol / Utility
Boeing P-8	United States	ASW / Patrol	P-8I	12	6 planned
Britten-Norman BN-2	United Kingdom	Patrol / Utility	BN-2B/2T	4	
Dornier 228	Germany / India (Note: License produced by Hindustan Aeronautics Limited)	Patrol / Surveillance	228-201	31	Includes 4 upgraded, rest being upgraded. 8 more on order
Helicopters
Aérospatiale Alouette III	France / India	Utility	Chetak	42	
HAL Dhruv	India	Utility	Dhruv Mk I/III	24	
Kamov Ka-27	Russia	ASW	Ka-28	14	
Westland Sea King	United Kingdom	ASW	WS-61 Mk 42B	25	
Westland Sea King	United Kingdom	Utility	WS-61 Mk 42C	25	
Kamov Ka-31	Russia	AEW	Ka-31	14	
Sikorsky SH-60	United States	Combat / Utility	MH-60R	22	2 on order
Trainer
BAE Hawk	United Kingdom / India	Jet trainer	Hawk 132	17	
HAL Kiran	India	Jet trainer	HJT-16	18	
Pipistrel Virus	Slovenia	Ab-initio trainer	Garud	12	
UAV
Elbit Hermes 900	Israel / India (Note: Manufactured by Adani Defence in partnership with Elbit Systems)	Surveillance	Drishti-10	1	10 planned
IAI Heron	Israel	Surveillance	Heron Mk I	10	
General Atomics MQ-9 Reaper	United States	Combat / Surveillance	SeaGuardian	2	15 on order

=== Weapon systems ===
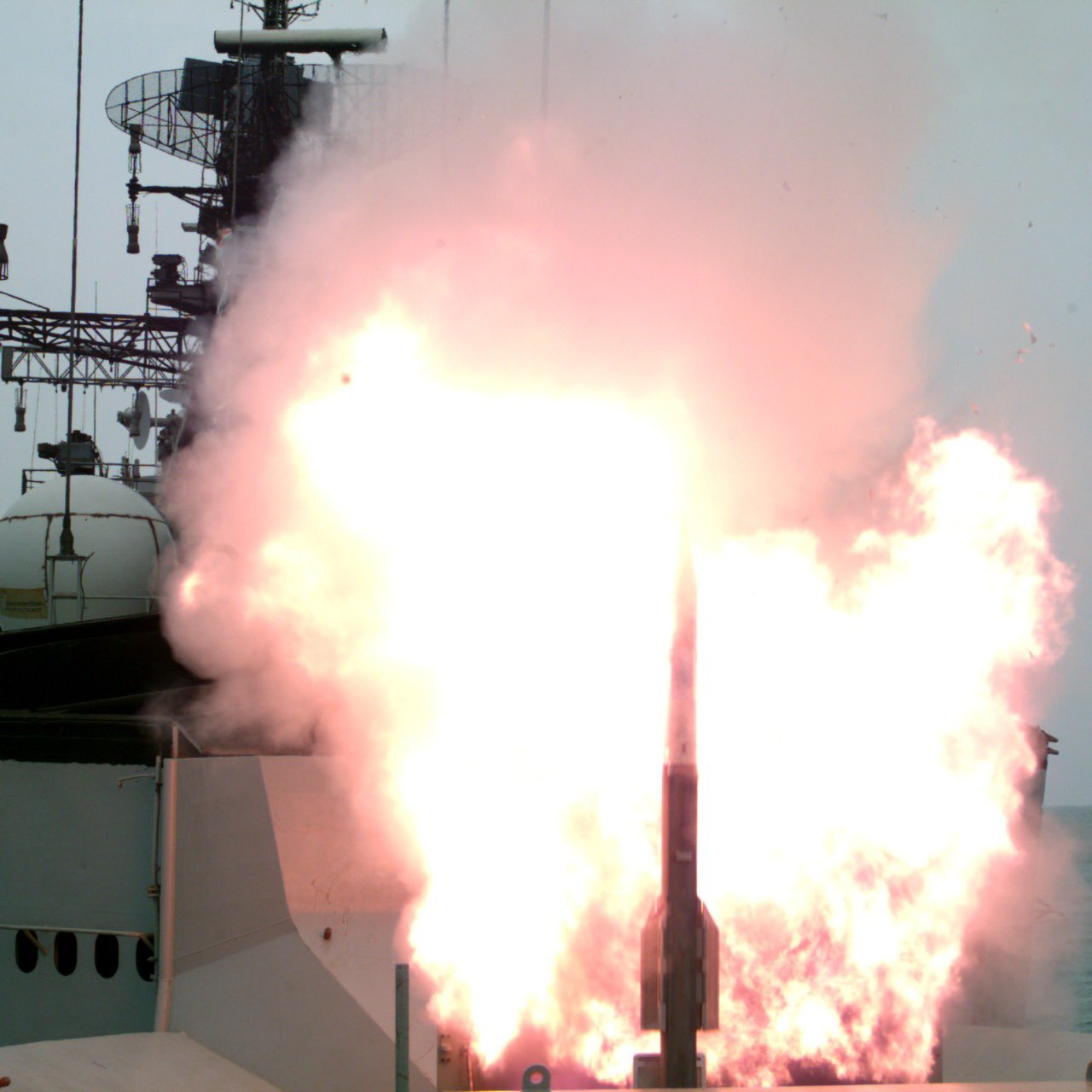
VL-SRSAM fired from Naval ship will replace Barak-1 in service.

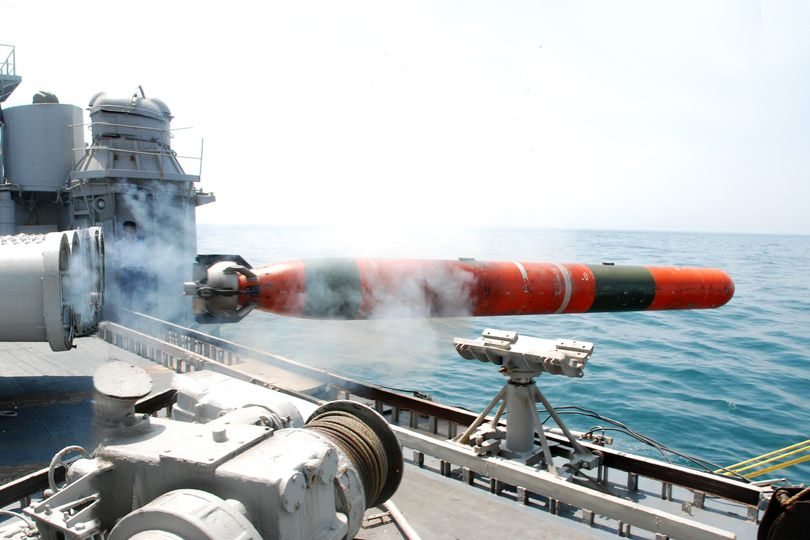
Shakti Thermal Torpedo

The Navy use a mix of indigenously developed and foreign made missile systems. These include submarine-launched ballistic missiles, ship-launched ballistic missiles, cruise and anti-ship missiles, air-to-air missiles, surface-to-air missiles, torpedoes, air-to-air guns, main guns and anti-submarine rocket launchers. Its inventory comprises 100 mm (3.9 in) AK 190 gun with a range of 21.5 kilometres (13.4 mi), 130 kilometres (81 mi) KH-35E 4 Quad Uran, ASW RBU-2000 etc.

In recent years, BrahMos has been one of the most advanced missile system adapted by the Indian Navy. It has been jointly developed by India's Defence Research and Development Organisation (DRDO) and Russian NPO Mashinostroyeniya. BrahMos is the world's fastest anti-ship cruise missile in operation. The BrahMos has been tailored to meet Indian needs and features a large proportion of India-designed components and technology, including its fire control systems, transporter erector launchers, and its onboard navigational attack systems. The successful test of Brahmos from INS Rajput provides Indian Navy with precision land attack capability.

India has also fitted its Boeing P-8I reconnaissance aircraft with all-weather, active-radar-homing, over-the-horizon AGM-84L Harpoon Block II missiles and Mk 54 All-Up-Round Lightweight Torpedoes. Indian warships' primary air-defence shield is provided by Barak 1 surface-to-air missile while an advanced version Barak 8 is in development in collaboration with Israel. India's next-generation Scorpène-class submarines will be armed with Exocet anti-ship missile system. Among indigenous missiles, ship-launched version of Prithvi-II is called Dhanush, which has a range of 350 kilometres (220 mi) and can carry nuclear warheads.

The K-15 Sagarika (Oceanic) submarine-launched ballistic missile (SLBM), which has a range of at least 700 km (some sources claim 1000 km) forms part of India's nuclear triad and is extensively tested to be integrated with the Arihant class of nuclear submarines. A longer range submarine launched ballistic missile called K-4 is under induction process, to be followed by K-5 SLBM.

=== Electronic warfare and systems management ===
Sangraha is a joint electronic warfare programme between Defence Research and Development Organisation (DRDO) and the Indian Navy. The programme is intended to develop a family of electronic warfare suites, for use on different naval platforms capable of detecting, intercepting, and classifying pulsed, carrier wave, pulse repetition frequency agile, frequency agile and chirp radars. The systems are suitable for deployment on various platforms like helicopters, vehicles, and ships. Certain platforms, along with ESM (Electronic Support Measures) capabilities, have ECM (Electronic Countermeasure) capabilities such as multiple-beam phased array jammers.

The Indian Navy also relies on information technology to face the challenges of the 21st century. The Indian Navy is implementing a new strategy to move from a platform centric force to a network centric force by linking all shore-based installations and ships via a high-speed data networks and satellites. This will help in increased operational awareness. The network is referred to as the Navy Enterprise Wide Network (NEWN). The Indian Navy has also provided training to all its personnel in Information Technology (IT) at the Naval Institute of Computer Applications (NICA) located in Mumbai. Information technology is also used to provide better training, like the usage of simulators and for better management of the force.

The Navy has a dedicated cadre for matters pertaining to information technology cadre named as Information Technology Cadre, under the Directorate of Information Technology (DRI). The cadre is responsible for implementation for enterprise wide networking and software development projects, development activities with respect to cyber security products, administration of shore and on-board networks, and management of critical Naval Networks and software applications.

=== Naval satellite ===
India's first exclusive defence satellite GSAT-7 was successfully launched by European space consortium Arianespace's rocket from Kourou spaceport in French Guiana in August 2013. GSAT-7 was fabricated by the Indian Space Research Organisation (ISRO) to serve for at least seven years in its orbital slot at 74°E, providing UHF, S-band, C-band and Ku-band relay capacity. Its Ku-band allows high-density data transmission, including both audio and video. This satellite also has a provision to reach smaller and mobile terminals.

GSAT-7 approximately has a footprint of 3,500–4,000 kilometres (2,200–2,500 miles; 1,900–2,200 nautical miles) over the Indian Ocean region, including both the Arabian Sea and the Bay of Bengal region. This enables the Navy to operate in a network-centric atmosphere having real-time networking of all its operational assets at sea and on land.

On 15 June 2019 the navy placed an order for GSAT-7R satellite as a replacement for GSAT-7. The satellite costs ₹1,589 crore (equivalent to ₹20 billion or US$210 million in 2023) and is expected to be launched by 2020.

== Activities ==
=== Fleet reviews ===
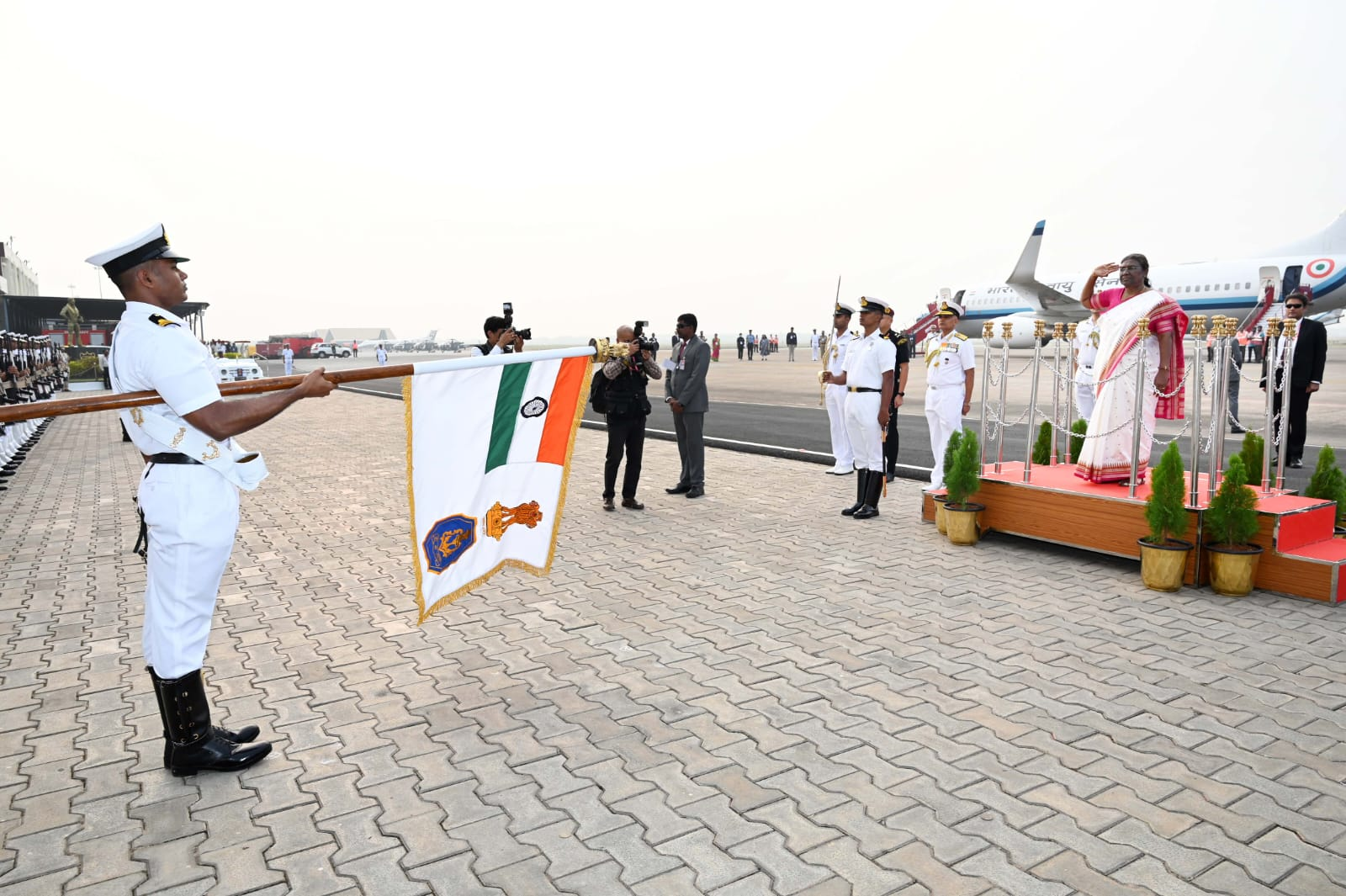
President of India taking salute unveiling Indian Navy's Standard and Color highlighting India's maritime heritage

The President of India is entitled to inspect his/her fleet, as he/she is the supreme commander of the Indian Armed Forces. The first president's fleet review by India was hosted by Rajendra Prasad on 10 October 1953. President's reviews usually take place once in the President's term. In all, twelve fleet reviews have taken place, including two International fleet reviews in 2011 and 2016. The latest fleet review was held in February 2022 at Visakhapatnam, by President Ram Nath Kovind.

The Indian Navy also conducted an International fleet review named Bridges of Friendship in February 2001 in Mumbai. Many ships of friendly Navies from all around the world participated, including two from the US Navy. The second international fleet review, the International Fleet Review 2016, was held off Visakhapatnam coast in February 2016 where Indian Navy's focus was on improving diplomatic relations and military compatibility with other nations.

=== Naval exercises ===
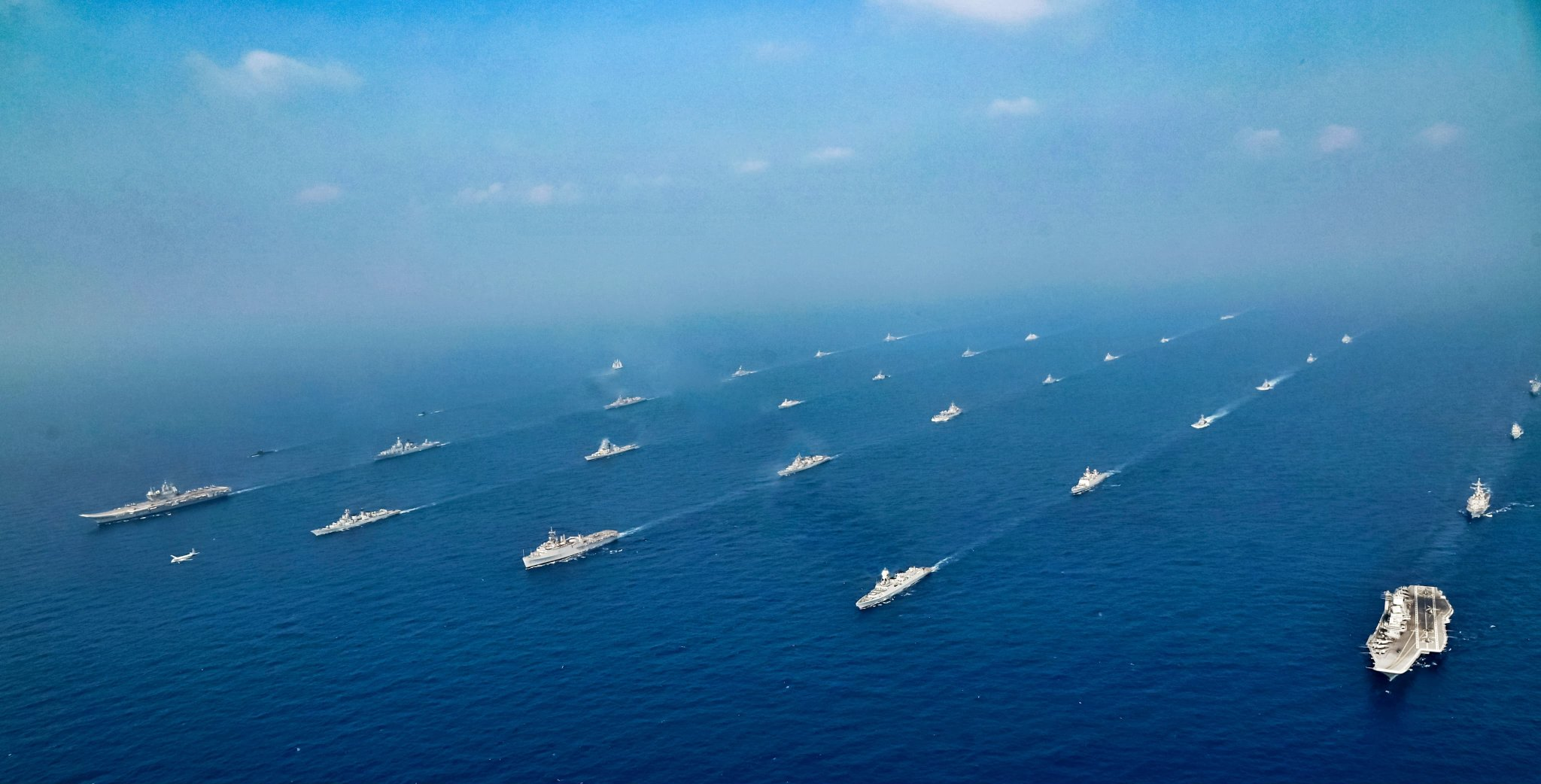
Milan exercise 2024 grows in size with 50 foreign countries participating from 4 in 1995

India often conducts naval exercises (like Maritime Partnership Exercise) with other friendly countries designed to increase naval cooperation and also to strengthen cooperative security relationship. Some such exercises take place annually or biennially:

Exercise	Navy/Navies	First Edition	Last Edition	Total Editions	Notes/ References
Milan	Multilateral	1995	2024	12	
Varuna	French Navy	1993	2023	21	
Konkan	Royal Navy	2004	2023	16	
INDRA	Russian Navy	2003	2021	12	
MALABAR	US Navy, JMSDF, Royal Australian Navy (Flag exercise of the QUAD navies)	1992	2023	26	
SIMBEX	Singapore Navy	1994	2021	28	
IBSAMAR	Brazilian Navy, South African Navy	2008	2022	7	
SITMEX	Singapore Navy, Thai Navy	2019	2021	3	
SLINEX	Sri Lanka Navy	2012	2020	8	
NASEEM-AL-BAHR	Oman Navy	1993	2022	13	
AUSINDEX	Australian Navy	2015	2023	5	
JIMEX	JMSDF	2012	2023	11	
ZA'IR-AL-BAHR	Qatari Navy	2019	2021	2	
SAMUDRA SHAKTI	Indonesian Navy	2018	2023	4	
BONGOSAGAR	Bangladesh Navy	2019	2023	5	
Zayed Talwar	UAE Navy	2021	2023	2	
Al-Mohed Al-Hindi	Saudi Navy	2021	2023	2	
AIKEYME	Africa	2025	2025	1	

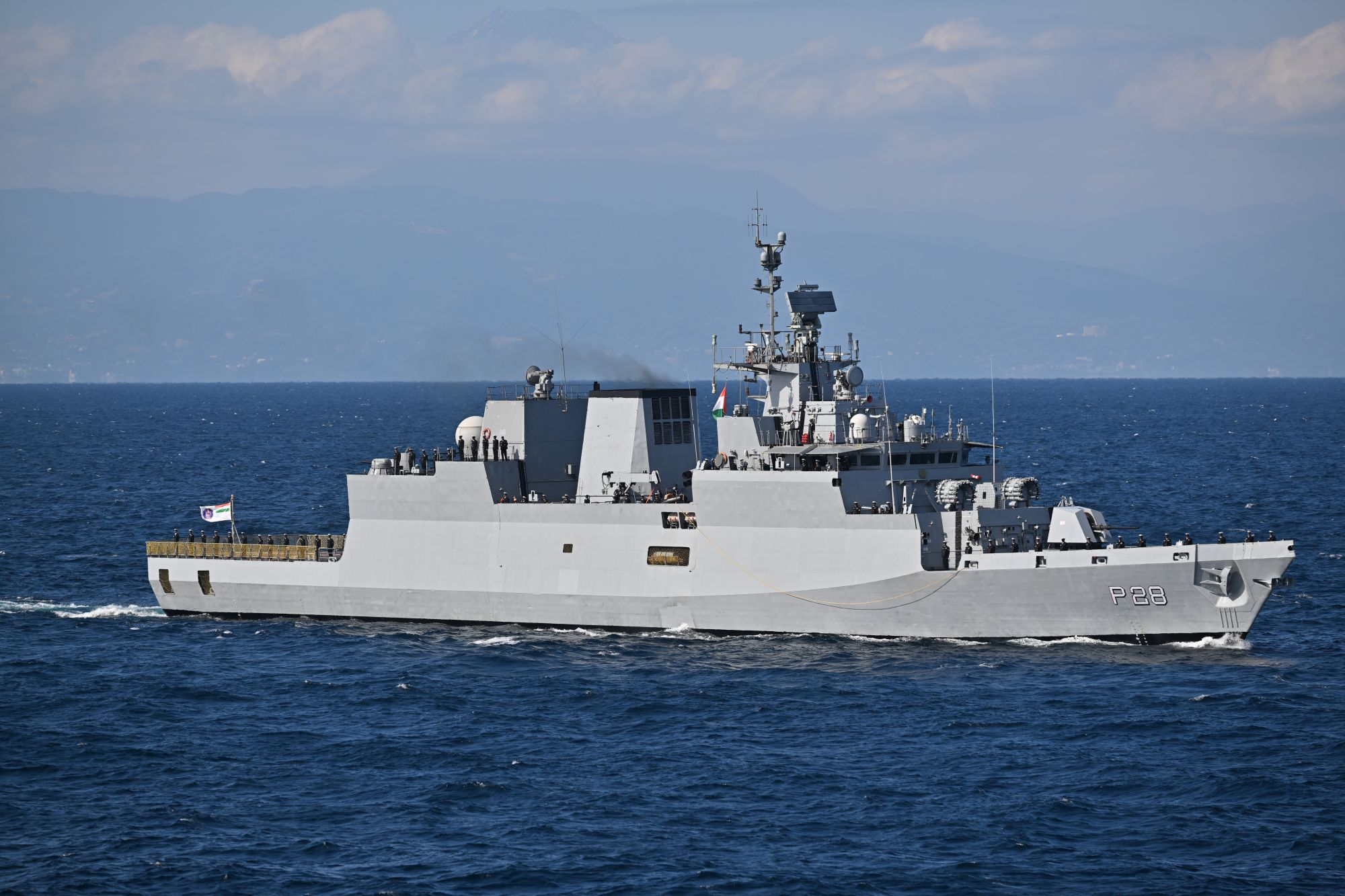
INS Kamorta in Japan for International fleet review

Coordinated patrols include: Indo–Thai CORPAT (28 editions), Indonesia–India CORPAT (33 editions), IMCOR with Myanmar (8 editions). The Indian Navy conducted a naval exercise with the People's Liberation Army Navy in 2003, and also sent ships to the South China Sea to participate in the fleet review. In 2005, TROPEX (Theatre-level Readiness Operational Exercises) was held during which Indian Navy experimented the doctrine of influencing a land and air battle to support the Indian Army and the Indian Air Force. TROPEX has been conducted annually every year with an exception to 2016. In 2007, Indian Navy conducted naval exercises with Japan Maritime Self-Defence Force and U.S. Navy in the Pacific, and also signed an agreement with Japan in October 2008 for joint naval patrolling in the Asia-Pacific region. In 2007, India conducted naval exercises with Vietnam, Philippines, and New Zealand. In 2007, India and South Korea conducted an annual naval exercise, alongside India's participation in the South Korean International Fleet Review in 2008. The first Atlantic Ocean deployment of the Indian Navy happened in 2009. During this deployment, the Indian Naval fleet conducted exercises with the French, German, Russian and British navies. Once in two years navies from the Indian Ocean region meet at the Andaman and Nicobar Islands for the Exercise MILAN. In 2021 India assisted in US-led Exercise Cutlass Express as a trainer.

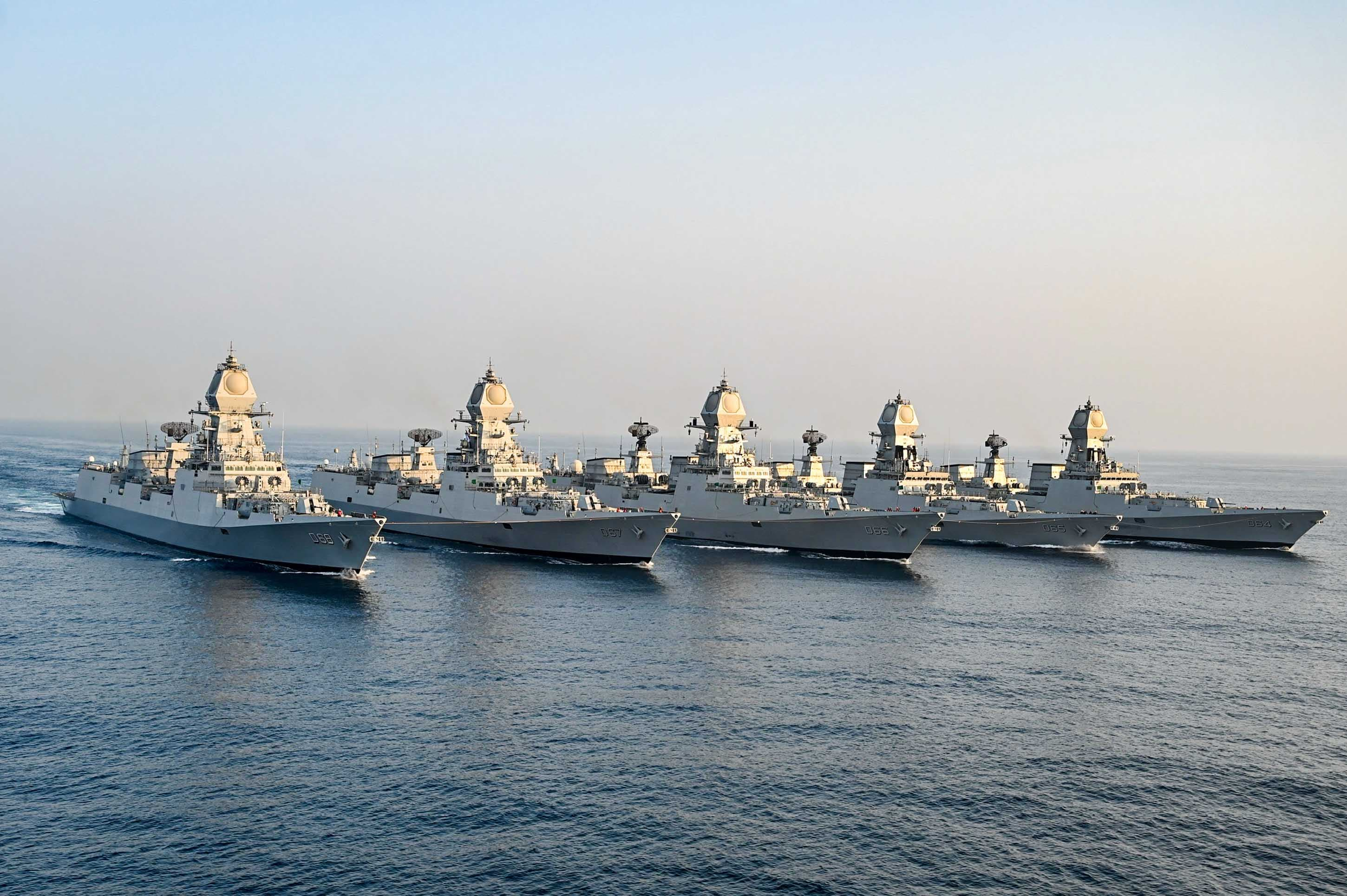
Indian Navy's destroyers sailing in unison during Exercise Tropex 2025

In 2007 India held the first Indian Ocean Naval Symposium (IONS) with an objective to provide a forum for all the littoral nations of the Indian Ocean to co-operate on mutually agreed areas for better security in the region. Since the past decade, Indian naval ships have made goodwill port calls to Israel, Turkey, Egypt, Greece, Thailand, Indonesia, Australia, New Zealand, Tonga, South Africa, Kenya, Qatar, Oman, United Arab Emirates, Bahrain, Kuwait, and various other countries.

=== Exploration ===
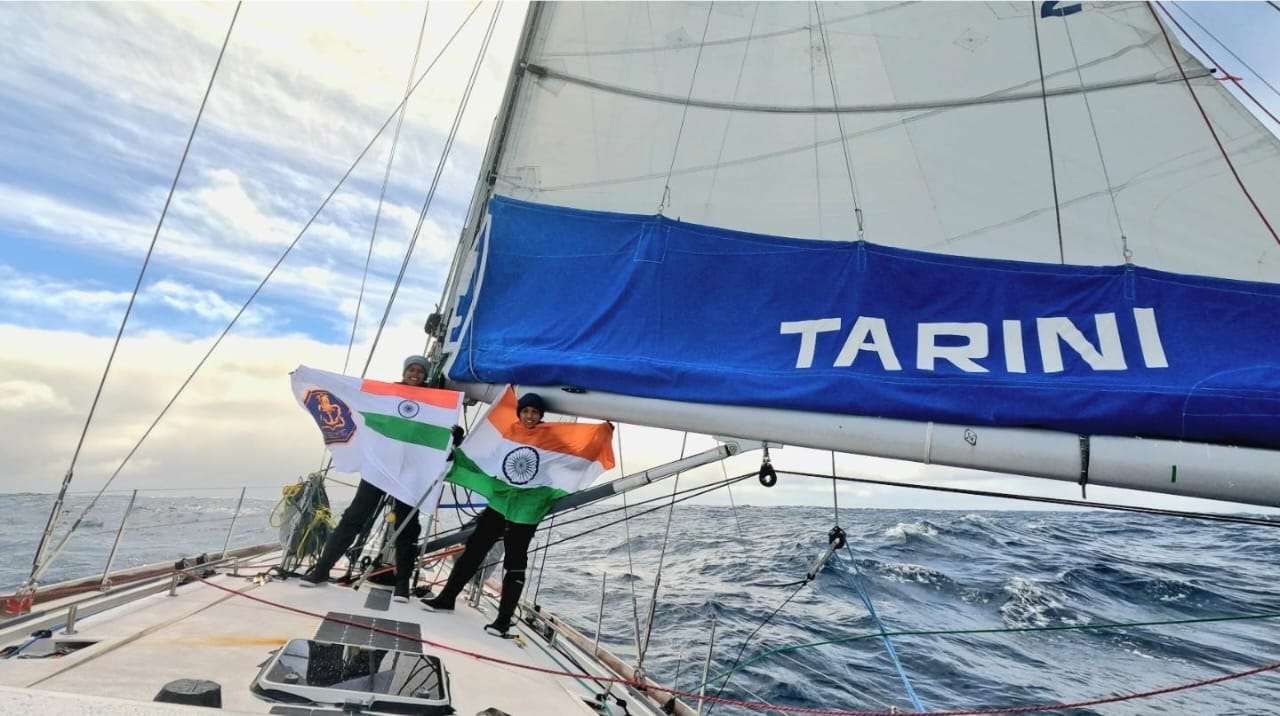
Lt Cdr Dilna K & Lt Cdr Roopa crossed Point Nemo in INSV Tarini, during their Navika Sagar Parikrama II expedition

The Indian Navy regularly conducts adventure expeditions. The sailing ship and training vessel INS Tarangini began circumnavigating the world on 23 January 2003, intending to foster good relations with various other nations; she returned to India in May 2004 after visiting 36 ports in 18 nations.

Lt. Cdr. M. S. Kohli led the Indian Navy's first successful expedition to Mount Everest in 1965; the Navy's ensign was again flown atop Everest on 19 May 2004 by a similar expedition. Another Navy team also successfully scaled Everest from the north face, a technically more challenging route. The expedition was led by Cdr Satyabrata Dam of the submarine arm. Cdr. Dam is a mountaineer of international repute and has climbed many mountains including the Patagonias, the Alps among others. In 2017, to commemorate 50 years of the Navy's first expedition in 1965, a team set off to climb Mount Everest.

An Indian Navy team comprising 11 members successfully completed an expedition to the Arctic pole. To prepare, they first traveled to Iceland, where they attempted to summit a peak. The team next flew to eastern Greenland; in the Kulusuk and Angmassalik areas, they used Inuit boats to navigate the region's ice-choked fjords. They crossed northward across the Arctic Circle, reaching seventy degrees North on skis. The team scaled an unnamed peak of height 11,000 feet (3,400 m) and named it Indian Peak.

The Indian Naval ensign first flew in Antarctica in 1981. The Indian Navy succeeded in Mission Dakshin Dhruv 2006 by traversing to the South Pole on skis. With this historic expedition, they have set the record for being the first military team to have successfully completed a ski traverse to the Geographic South Pole. Also, three of the ten member team—the expedition leader—Cdr. Satyabrata Dam, leading medical assistants Rakesh Kumar and Vikas Kumar are now among the few people in the world to have visited the two poles and summited Mount Everest. Indian Navy became the first organisation to reach the poles and Mount Everest. Cdr. Dilip Donde completed the first solo circumnavigation by an Indian citizen on 22 May 2010. Cdr. Abhilash Tomy became the first Indian to complete a solo, non-stop circumnavigation of the world on a sailboat not fitted with any technology or navigational aids.

Navika Sagar Parikrama (lit. 'Sailors' Sea Circumambulation') was a circumnavigation of the globe by female officers of the Indian Navy. The six-member all-woman team circumnavigated and managed the whole operation in their first-ever global journey, with their ship INSV Tarini that lasted 254 days. Navika Sagar Parikrama II is led by two women officers.

== Future of the Indian Navy ==
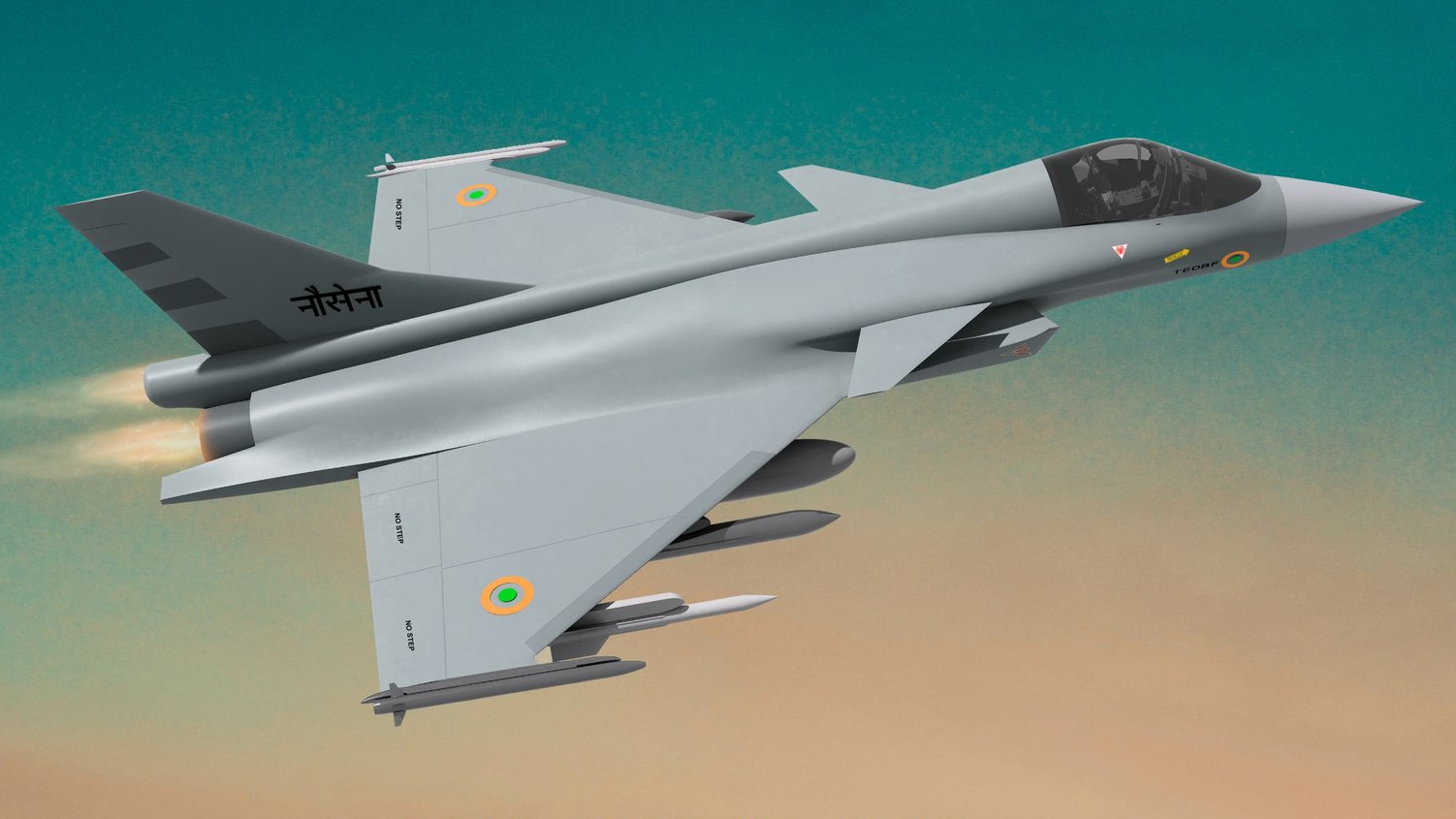
HAL TEDBF will replace the MiG-29Ks in service.

By the end of the 14th Plan (2020), the Indian Navy was expected to have over 150 ships and close to 500 aircraft. In addition to the existing mission of securing both sea flanks in the Bay of Bengal and the Arabian Sea, the navy was tasked with responding to emergencies far away from the Indian mainland. Marine assault capabilities were to be enhanced by setting up a new amphibious warfare facility at Kakinada, Andhra Pradesh.

Since then, the Indian Navy has initiated Phase II expansion of INS Kadamba, its third largest naval base, near Karwar. Phase II will involve expansion of the berthing facilities to accommodate 40–45 more front-line warships, including the aircraft carrier INS Vikramaditya, raise manpower to 300 officers and around 2,500 sailors, and build a naval air station with a 6,000-foot runway. This is to be followed by Phase IIA and IIB, at the end of which INS Kadamba will be able to base 50 front-line warships. The Indian Navy is also in the process of constructing a new naval base, INS Varsha, at Rambilli for its Arihant class submarines.

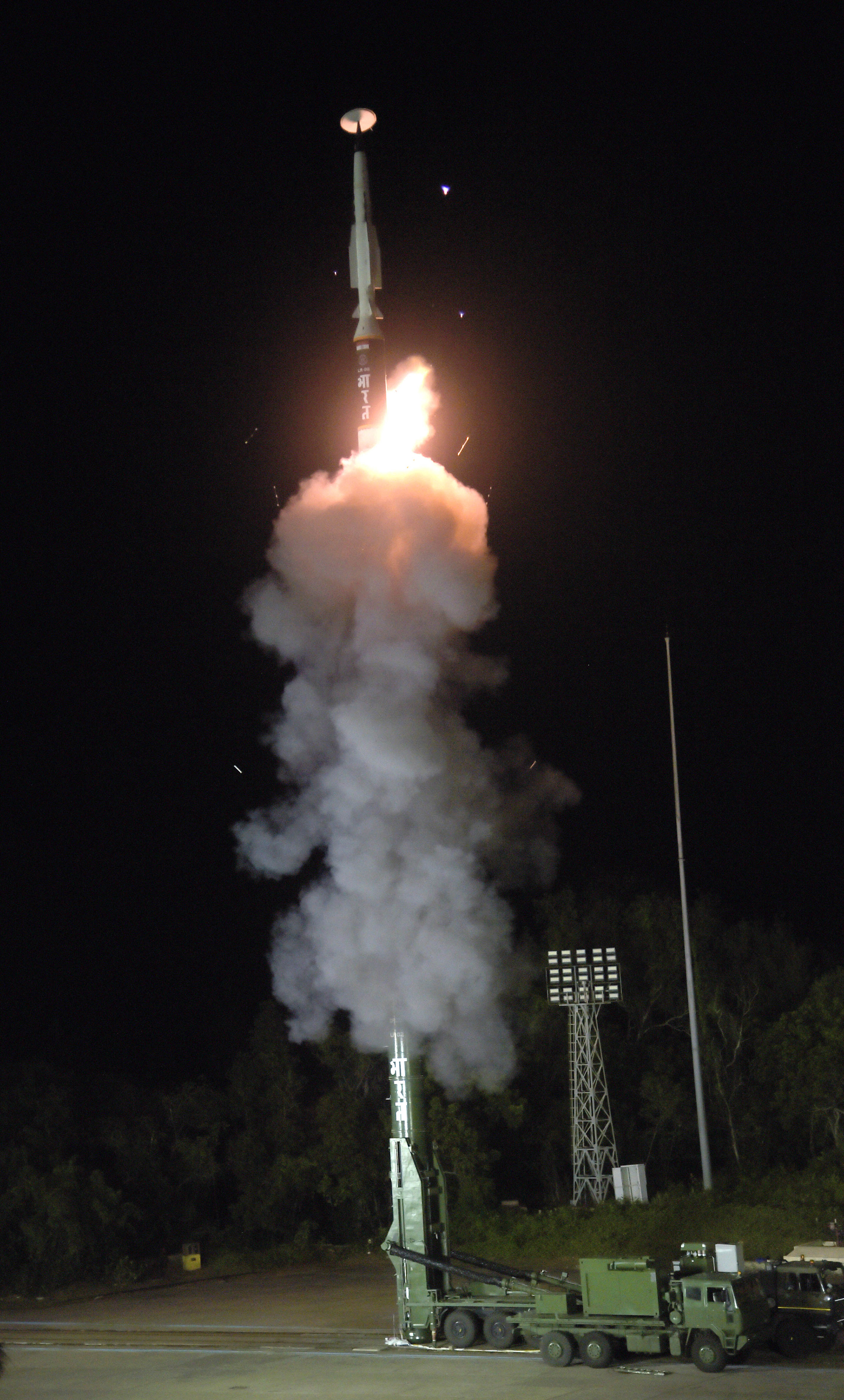
Hypersonic LRAShM undergoing tests

India's planned second aircraft carrier, INS Vishal (formerly known as Indigenous Aircraft Carrier-II), will displace around 65,000 tonnes and is expected to be delivered to the Indian Navy in the mid-2030s. With the future delivery of Vishal, the Navy's goal to have three aircraft carriers in service, with two fully operational carriers and a third in refit, will be achieved.

In November 2011, the Defence Acquisition Council launched the Multi-Role Support Vessel. The Indian Navy has subsequently sent out an international RFP for up to 2 large landing helicopter docks. The contenders are expected to tie up with local shipyards for construction of the ships.

In addition to aircraft carriers and large amphibious assault ships, the Indian Navy is acquiring numerous surface combatants such as the Project 17A-class and Talwar-class frigates, ASW shallow water corvettes, ASuW corvettes, and MCM vessels. It plans to build Project 18-class destroyer and Project 17B-class frigate. New submarine classes under various stages of planning include the Project 75 Alpha, Project 75I, and the nuclear-powered Arihant class. New auxiliary ships include; five replenishment oilers, a Missile Range Instrumentation Ship (MRIS) and an Ocean Surveillance Ship.

Matangi ASV on autonomous transit

In 2024, Sagar Defence Engineering Pvt Ltd demonstrated 850 nautical mile autonomous transit of, Matangi Autonomous Surface Vessel to the Indian Navy. The autonomous transit began from Mumbai and ended at Toothukudi. This demonstration was part of Indian Navy's Swavalamban 2024 self reliance in technology contest to enable the development of autonomous vessels for various military applications. These boats are equipped with 12.7mm SRCG gun and is capable of day and night patrolling with speed above 50 knots. 12 such autonomous boats are to be acquired by the Indian Navy and will also be used to patrol Pangong Tso lake. The Indian Navy is also acquiring 30 autonomous underwater vehicles. The Indian Navy is planning to procure 22 General Atomics Sea Guardian drones at an estimated cost of $2 billion. This is the first instance of General Atomics drones being sold to a non-NATO military.

== Indian Naval Ensign ==
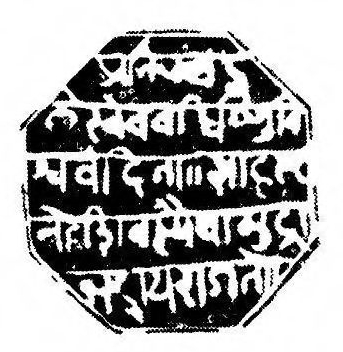
The rajmudra (seal) used by Shivaji I.

The Indian Navy from 1950 to 2001 used a modified version of the British White Ensign, with the Union flag replaced with the Indian Tricolour in the canton. In 2001, this flag was replaced with a white ensign bearing the Indian Navy crest, as the previous ensign was thought to reflect India's colonial past. However complaints arose that the new ensign was indistinguishable as the blue of the naval crest easily merged with the sky and the ocean. Hence in 2004, the ensign was changed back to the St. George's cross design, with the addition of the emblem of India in the intersection of the cross. In 2014, the ensign as well as the naval crest was further modified to include the Devanagari script: सत्यमेव जयते (Satyameva Jayate) which means 'Truth Alone Triumphs' in Sanskrit.

The traditional crest of Indian Navy ships is topped by a crown featuring three sailing ships symbolising India's rich maritime history. The ribbon of the crown depicts the Ashoka Chakra surrounded by a horse and a bull. Each ship has a unique motif which is encircled by a ring of lotus buds.

In August 2022, the Prime Minister's Office announced that the naval ensign featuring the Saint George's Cross would be irrevocably disposed of, in favour of a newer design derived from octagonal shaped imperial seal of Chhatrapati Shivaji Maharaj and his Maratha Navy that would "do away with the colonial past" and reflect the "rich Indian maritime heritage". The new ensign is slated to be revealed by prime minister Narendra Modi on 2 September 2022, coinciding with the commissioning ceremony of INS Vikrant, the Indian Navy's first indigenously built aircraft carrier. The new ensign retains much the design of the 2001-04 ensign with the national flag as the canton, but with the addition of an octagonal navy blue shield based on Shivaji's royal seal surrounding the heraldic arms in gold and the addition of the official motto of the Navy May the Lord of Waters Be Auspicious Unto Us (Shaṁ No Varunaḥ) in the Devanagari script.

== Documents ==
Indian Maritime Doctrine
- 2004, 2009, 2014
- Author: Maritime Doctrines and Concepts Centre (MDCC)
- Publisher: Integrated Headquarters, Ministry of Defence (Navy)
- Website: https://www.indiannavy.nic.in/content/indian-maritime-doctrine-2015-version

The Indian Maritime Doctrine is a foundational primer document of the Indian Navy. Three editions have been published in 2004, 2009 and 2014. It has to be considered along with other foundational documents such as the naval strategy Freedom to Use the Seas (2007) and the updated edition Ensuring Secure Seas (2015).

The 2004 edition (INBR 8) was published amidst a larger strategic overhaul in the country. It contains a large number of key words along with their definitions and grouped into a number of sections. Select themes pervade throughout the document. Some themes are subtle such as the ongoing and future transition to a blue-water navy and others are louder such as the text related to nuclear submarines and aircraft carriers. There is justification and explanation for India's need for these transitions and acquisitions. The 2009 edition was updated to include counter-terror, counter-piracy and coordination with other navies in these aspects.

== See also ==
- Indian Naval Academy
- Indian Coast Guard
- Indian Ocean Naval Symposium
- Information Management and Analysis Centre
- Naval ranks and insignia of India
- Integrated Defence Staff
- Exclusive economic zone of India, protected by the Indian Navy
- List of ships of the Indian Navy
- List of equipment of the Indian Coast Guard
- Indian Navy Sports Club

== Media ==
In the year 2009, the National Geographic Channel created and broadcast a documentary series on the Indian Navy. It was titled Mission Navy
