= Submarine-building Perspective Plan =

Indian submarine diesel-electric acquistion project

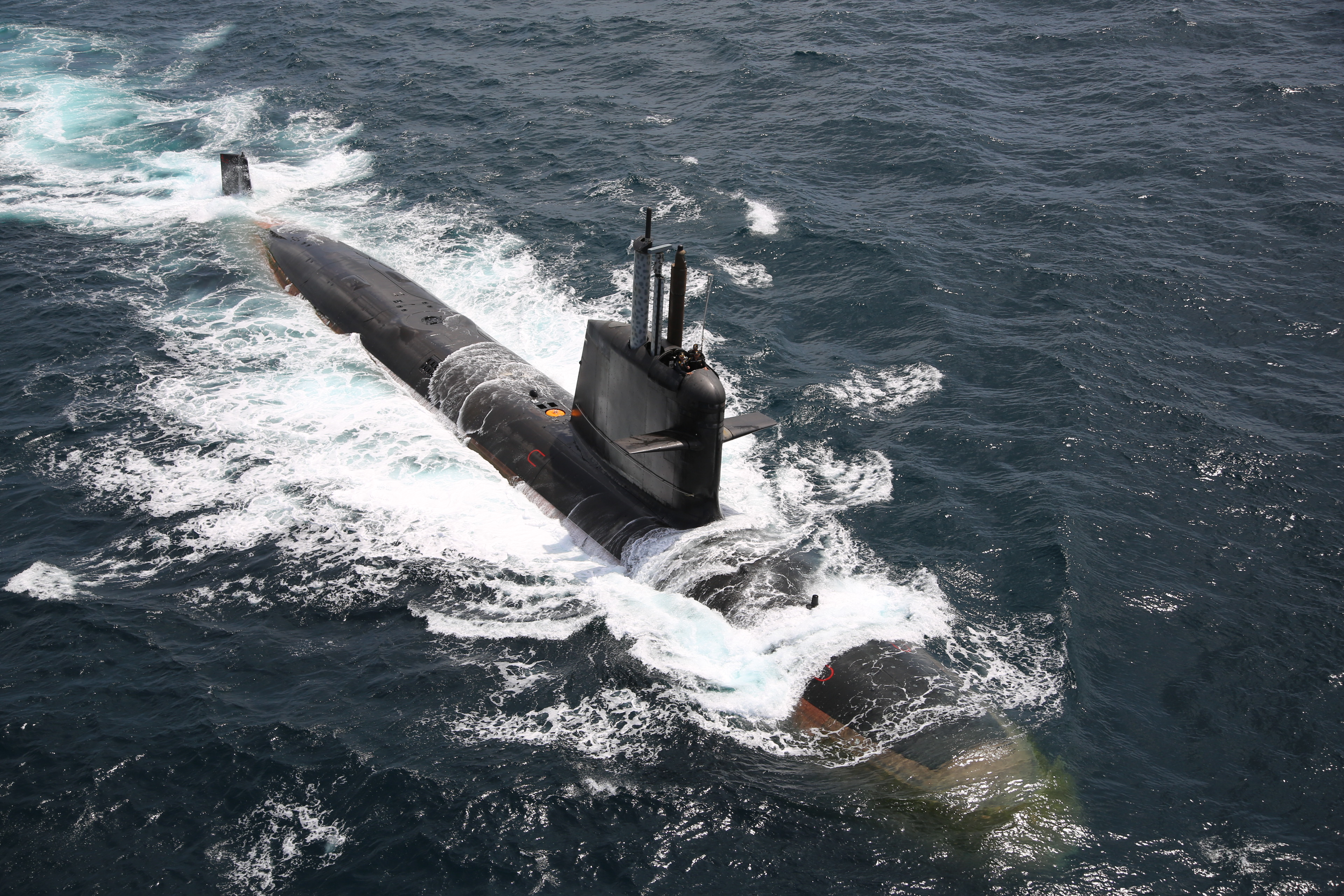
The lead vessel of the Kalvari-class submarine at sea

The Submarine-building Perspective Plan is a procurement and development plan of the Indian Navy to replace its ageing fleet of attack submarine. The plan was approved in 1999 just following the Kargil War and would result in 24 submarines to be constructed in two phases over a duration of 30 years.

== Origins and approval ==
In 1997, the Cabinet Committee on Security (CCS) — the final decision-making body of the Government of India on all matters of India's national security chaired by the Prime Minister — approved the construction of two Type 209/1500 attack submarines (SSK) at a then-estimated cost of INR ₹700 crore. This effort, which was conceived in the wake of an international corruption scandal related to India's acquisition of the Shishumar-class submarines, called for the construction of two Type 209/1500 SSKs at Mazagon Dock Shipbuilders Limited (MDL) with the assistance of a foreign naval firm in a corroborative role. In accordance with the scheme, the Indian Navy (IN) and MDL approached several naval enterprises for assistance; however, the French-based Thomson-CSF (TCSF) was the only firm willing to participate.

Two years later, on 12 July 1999, the Cabinet Committee on Security (CCS) approved a two-phase plan to build 24 submarines over a span of 30 years. The plan was named 'Project for Series Construction of Submarines for the Indian Navy and Acquisition of National Competence in Submarine Building', also referred as 'Submarine-building Perspective Plan'. For the first phase, six submarines each were to be built at MDL under Project 75 (P-75) along with a parallel production line of another public/private shipyard under Project-75 (India) or P-75(I) with technology transfer. Under the second phase, twelve submarines would be built including complete indigenous design, development and construction of submarines in India. While the first phase was scheduled for completion within 2012, the second phase would be executed in 2012–2030.

== Phase I ==
For the Project-75, two options emerged. The first being construction of the Type 209/1500 at MDL initially with the combat suite of TCSF with the rest being based on modified Scorpène submarine design based on Naval requirements. The second option recommended the construction of all the SSKs based on the newer Scorpène design. Ultimately, the Naval Heqadquarters chose the latter, reasoning that the Scorpène, which had been offered with a provision of technology transfer (TOT), was more advanced than the Type 209/1500. The initial plan to ally with TCSF was dropped in April 2001 and negotiations for the procurement of the Scorpène design under the first phase, dubbed Project-75 (P-75), began in November 2001. The Scorpène design was offered by another French-based naval firm, Armaris (later DCNS, now Naval Group). The P-75 contract signed on 6 October 2005 resulted in the construction of six Kalvari-class submarines beginning 23 May 2009. The final unit, INS Vagsheer (S26), was commissioned in January 2025.

Though the second batch of six submarines, under Project-75 (India), was to be executed simultaneously alongside P-75, financial constraints within the MoD led to P-75 being the only project sanctioned for six submarines. Proposals to move ahead with the acquisition failed twice after the project was approved in 2010 and 2014. Following delays, the Navy mandated the presence of an operational air-independent propulsion (AIP) plant with the submarine design. This was done to maintain the submarine's relevance in future as the boats' induction timeline was already delayed to 2022. The third approval from the Defence Acquisition Council (DAC), chaired by the Indian Minister of Defence, was accorded in January 2019. In January 2025, the bid by Larsen & Toubro to build S-80 Plus-class submarine, in collaboration with Spain's Navantia, was disqualified. Mazagon Dock's partnership with TKMS remained the only technically compliant bidder who were thereafter invited for techno-commercial negotiations with the Indian Ministry of Defence. Negotiations were reported to have begun in July 2025 and the union finance ministry cleared the deal on 28 May 2026. The deal could be signed in September 2026.

== Phase II ==
The second phase of the plan envisioned the complete indigenous design and construction of twelve diesel-electric submarines for the Indian Navy. The design would incorporate the know-how and experience gained from the phase I projects.

However, the plan was amended midway to maintain the relevance of the submarine fleets as per evolving threats. The program to construct and deploy a fleet of nuclear submarines was first envisaged in late 1990s was fast-tracked following growing patrols by the People's Liberation Army Navy ships. This included a solitary two-month "anti-piracy" patrol by a Type 093 submarine in the Indian Ocean before returning to Yulin Naval Base on 13 December 2013. On 12 February 2014, R&AW evaluations described the deployment as having significantly intensified India’s security concerns. The Navy has already acquired experience of operating nuclear submarines after leasing of INS Chakra (1987) and INS Chakra (2011) for three and nine years, respectively. The force has also ordered a third Chakra submarine for a lease of 10 years starting 2025. The submarine is expected to be delivered to India in 2028 following delays.

In February 2015, the Government of India through a Cabinet Committee on Security (CCS) approval, gave rise to another indigenous submarine project — the Project 75 Alpha (now Project 77). A fleet of six nuclear attack submarines, with a displacement of 6,000 tonnes, were to be built under the project. The design phase had begun by December 2017 with constructions to commence by 2023–24 and first unit to enter service in 2032. The preliminary design phase was completed by February 2020. In October 2024, the CCS cleared the construction of first two units in the Shipbuilding Centre (SBC), Visakhapatnam, of the Ministry of Defence where the Arihant-class submarines were built. The displacement was increased to 9,800 tonnes and equipped with 200 MWe-rated nuclear reactor. The first submarines will be inducted in by 2039.

With the approval of the Project 77, the number of conventionally-powered boats under Project-76 was reduced to six units. The design was expected to inherit elements from the Project-75 and Project-75(I) designs. The development was cleared by defence ministry in June 2024 followed by a feasibility study conducted by DRDO. An approval from the Cabinet Committee on Security (CCS) for the further detailed design of the submarine is due as of February 2025.

Both the Project 76 and the Project 77 are being led by the Advanced Technology Vessel headquarters which is responsible for the development and construction of India's nuclear-powered, ballistic missile submarine fleet including Arihant class and S5-class submarines. While the final submarine of the Arihant class is expected to be commissioned in 2027, the construction of first two units of S5 submarines has also begun at the Shipbuilding Centre (SBC), Visakhapatnam.

== See also ==
Related Indian military plans and lists

- Field Artillery Rationalisation Plan
- Kargil Review Committee
- Advanced Technology Vessel
- List of submarines of the Indian Navy

Similar procurement projects

- Korean Attack Submarine program
- Canadian Patrol Submarine Project
- Walrus-class replacement program
- SSN-AUKUS
