= Project-75 (India) submarine acquisition project =

Planned class of submarines

Project-75 (India)

Class overview
- Name: P75I-class submarines
- Builders: Mazagon Dock Shipbuilders
- Operators: Indian Navy
- Preceded by: Kalvari class
- Succeeded by: Project 76 class
- Cost: ₹70,000 crore (equivalent to ₹720 billion or US$7.5 billion in 2026)
- Planned: 6 + 3 (L1 + L2 possible bid)

General characteristics
- Type: Attack submarine
- Displacement: 3,000 tonnes
- Propulsion: Diesel-electric propulsion; Air-independent propulsion (AIP)
- Notes: Capable of conducting -: Anti-surface warfare (ASuW); Anti-submarine warfare (ASW); ISR; Special Operations Forces (SOF); Supporting operations ashore; Operating in open ocean and shallow/littoral waters

Project-75 (India), simply referred to as the P-75(I) program, is a military acquisition initiative affiliated to India's Ministry of Defence (MoD), aimed at the planned procurement of diesel-electric submarines for the Indian Navy (IN). Originally conceived in 1997, the initiative's objective has been to procure a class of six conventionally-powered attack submarines for the Indian Navy Submarine Arm, as a replacement for the force's Sindhughosh-class submarines.

The program has experienced multiple delays owing to hurdles emanating from bureaucratic red tape, inadequate planning and a lack of corporate competitiveness, causing longstanding delays to the program's timeline, which has consequently led to intense criticism.

Originally planned to enter operational service in the late-2020s, the six submarines are now expected to be delivered by the mid-2030s. In January 2025, initial negotiations for the purchase-cum-manufacturing of six submarines designed by ThyssenKrupp Marine Systems in partnership with Mazagon Dock Shipbuilders have commenced, with approval from the MoD expected soon. As of July 2025, the commercial and technical terms of the contract is expected to be finalised soon.

== Background ==
In 1997, the Cabinet Committee on Security (CCS) — the final decision-making body of the Government of India on all matters of India's national security chaired by the Prime Minister — approved the construction of two Type 209/1500 attack submarines (SSK) at a then-estimated cost of INR ₹700 crore. This effort, which was conceived in the wake of an international corruption scandal related to India's acquisition of the Shishumar-class submarines, called for the construction of two Type 209/1500 SSKs at Mazagon Dock Shipbuilders Limited (MDL) with the assistance of a foreign naval firm in a corroborative role. In accordance with the scheme, the Indian Navy (IN) and MDL approached several naval enterprises for assistance; however, the French-based Thomson-CSF (TCSF) was the only firm willing to participate.

Two years later, on 12 July 1999, the Cabinet Committee on Security (CCS) approved a two-phase plan to build 24 submarines over a span of 30 years. The plan was named 'Project for Series Construction of Submarines for the Indian Navy and Acquisition of National Competence in Submarine Building', also referred as 'Submarine-building Perspective Plan'. For the first phase, six submarines each were to be built at MDL under Project 75 (P-75) along with a parallel production line of another public/private shipyard under Project-75 (India) or P-75(I) with technology transfer. Under the second phase, twelve submarines would be built including complete indigenous design, development and construction of submarines in India. While the first phase was scheduled for completion within 2012, the second phase would be executed in 2012–2030.

For the Project-75, two options emerged. The first being construction of the Type 209/1500 at MDL initially with the combat suite of TCSF with the rest being based on modified Scorpène submarine design based on Naval requirements. The second option recommended the construction of all the SSKs based on the newer Scorpène design. Ultimately, the Naval Heqadquarters chose the latter, reasoning that the Scorpène, which had been offered with a provision of technology transfer (TOT), was more advanced than the Type 209/1500. The initial plan to ally with TCSF was dropped in April 2001 and negotiations for the procurement of the Scorpène design under the first phase, dubbed Project-75 (P-75), began in November 2001. The Scorpène design was offered by another French-based naval firm, Armaris (later DCNS, now Naval Group). The P-75 contract signed on 6 October 2005 resulted in the construction of six Kalvari-class submarines beginning 23 May 2009. The final unit, INS Vagsheer (S26), was commissioned in January 2025.

Though the second batch of six submarines, under Project-75 (India), was to be executed simultaneously alongside P-75, financial constraints within the MoD led to P-75 being the only project sanctioned for six submarines. Proposals to move ahead with the acquisition failed twice after the project was approved in 2010 and 2014. Following delays, the Navy mandated the presence of an operational air-independent propulsion (AIP) plant with the submarine design. This was done to maintain the submarine's relevance in future as the boats' induction timeline was already delayed to 2022. The third approval from the Defence Acquisition Council (DAC), chaired by the Indian Minister of Defence, was accorded in January 2019. In January 2025, the bid by Larsen & Toubro to build S-80 Plus-class submarine, in collaboration with Spain's Navantia, was disqualified. Mazagon Dock's partnership with TKMS remained the only bidder who were thereafter invited for techno-commercial negotiations with the Indian Ministry of Defence. Negotiations were reported to have begun in July 2025 while the deal could be signed in January 2026.

The second phase of the plan was amended midway to maintain the relevance of the submarine fleets as per evolving threats. The program to construct and deploy a fleet of nuclear submarines was first envisaged in late 1990s was fast-tracked following growing patrols by the People's Liberation Army Navy ships. This included a solitary two-month "anti-piracy" patrol by a Type 093 submarine in the Indian Ocean before returning to Yulin Naval Base on 13 December 2013. On 12 February 2014, R&AW evaluations described the deployment as having significantly intensified India’s security concerns. The Navy has already acquired experience of operating nuclear submarines after leasing of INS Chakra (1987) and INS Chakra (2011) for three and nine years, respectively. The force has also ordered a third Chakra submarine for a lease of 10 years starting 2025. The submarine is expected to be delivered to India in 2028 following delays.

In February 2015, the Government of India through a Cabinet Committee on Security (CCS) approval, gave rise to another indigenous submarine project — the Project 75 Alpha (now Project 77). A fleet of six nuclear attack submarines, with a displacement of 6,000 tonnes, were to be built under the project. The design phase had begun by December 2017 with constructions to commence by 2023–24 and first unit to enter service in 2032. The preliminary design phase was completed by February 2020. In October 2024, the CCS cleared the construction of first two units in the Shipbuilding Centre (SBC), Visakhapatnam, of the Ministry of Defence where the Arihant-class submarines were built. The displacement was increased to 9,800 tonnes and equipped with 200 MWe-rated nuclear reactor.

With the approval of the Project 77, the number of boats under Project-76 was reduced to six units. The design was expected to inherit elements from the Project-75 and Project-75(I) designs. The development was cleared by defence ministry in June 2024 followed by a feasibility study conducted by DRDO. An approval from the Cabinet Committee on Security (CCS) for the further detailed design of the submarine is due as of February 2025.

Both Project 76 and Project 77 are being led by the Advanced Technology Vessel headquarters which is responsible for the development and construction of India's nuclear-powered, ballistic missile submarine fleet including Arihant class and S5-class submarines. While the final two submarines from the Arihant class is expected to be commissioned in early 2026 and 2027, respectively, the construction of first two units of S5 submarines has also begun in the Shipbuilding Centre (SBC), Visakhapatnam.

== Design selection ==
=== 2008–10 ===
In 2008, the IN issued a request for information (RFI) to multiple naval firms, namely, Armaris, Howaldtswerke-Deutsche Werft (HDW), Rubin Design Bureau and Navantia to inquire about a possible acquisition of submarines equipped with specific features.

In July 2010, the P-75(I) initiative received its first official in-principle approval, termed an Acceptance of Necessity (AoN), from the Defence Acquisition Council (DAC) - the MoD's apex body on arms acquisitions. The DAC, then chaired by minister of defence A. K. Antony, had originally planned to build three of the six submarines at Mazagon Dock Limited (MDL) and one at Hindustan Shipyard Limited (HSL) with foreign assistance whilst procuring the remaining two submarines directly from a foreign vendor or from a private Indian shipyard, at a total budget of INR ₹50,000 crore (equivalent to ₹1.2 trillion or US$13 billion in 2026). However, the Indian Navy, which preferred the participation of private shipyards over public ones, disagreed with the DAC's plan. The difference in opinion between both parties over the initiative's path led to a two-year period of stagnation, during which the AoN expired twice.

=== 2011–16 ===
The MoD refreshed the AoN in 2013.

In October 2014, the Defence Acquisition Council (DAC) revived the initiative under a new mandate to build all six submarines in India with foreign assistance at an estimated cost of ₹53,000 crore (equivalent to ₹920 billion or US$9.6 billion in 2026). Alongside MDL and HSL, two state-run shipyards - Cochin Shipyard Limited (CSL) and Garden Reach Shipbuilders & Engineers (GRSE) and two private shipyards - Larsen & Toubro Shipbuilding (L&T) and Pipavav Shipyard Limited, were invited to participate in the bidding process. The clearance was provided along with the Swimmer Delivery Vessel midget submarine programme of the Navy.

=== Strategic Partnership policy ===
In May 2017, the DAC introduced a unique set of regulations for the procurement of specific sets of weaponry, titled the Strategic Partnership (SP) policy. Under the policy, an Indian private sector firm appropriately sanctioned beforehand by the MoD would have to ally with a foreign original equipment manufacturer (OEM), also sanctioned by the MoD, to contract-manufacture particular articles of weapons, including submarines. Accordingly, in any arm acquisition process sanctioned under the SP policy, the foreign OEMs would be shortlisted by the MoD on the basis of qualitative requirements, while the Indian firms would be shortlisted on the basis of technical, financial and infrastructure-related parameters. Post the selection process, the Indian firm would have to partner with the OEM to compete in the competition's bidding process; the alliance which quotes the lowest price would be declared the winner of the competition.

=== 2017–19 ===
In June 2017, the MoD announced that the P-75(I) initiative would be the first-ever arms acquisition project to be progressed under the SP policy.

In July 2017, the MoD issued a Request for Information (RFI) to six international arms majors for the construction of six submarines under the project. The RFI was issued to Rosoboronexport (Russia), Navantia (Spain), Saab (Sweden), ThyssenKrupp Marine Systems (Germany), Mitsubishi Heavy Industries (Japan) and Naval Group (formerly French DCNS). Out of the aforementioned six, only Navantia and Mitsubishi failed to respond within the deadline.

The project's AoN expired for a final time in February 2018.

In January 2019, the Defence Acquisition Council (DAC) re-approved the Acceptance of Necessity (AoN) of the construction of six submarines under the “Strategic Partnership” model at a cost of over ₹40,000 crore (equivalent to ₹540 billion or US$5.6 billion in 2026).This was the third time that the acquisition project was cleared after 2010 and 2014.

In April 2019, the IN issued an expression of interest (EOI) to the foreign vendors with the objective of seeking a submarine with the capability of firing land-attack missiles and anti-ship cruise missiles. Likewise, a similar EOI was also issued to four domestic companies: MDL, L&T, Reliance Naval and Engineering Limited and a consortium of HSL and Adani Defence.

Later that year, in June 2019, Daewoo Shipping & Marine Engineering (formerly DSME, today Hanwha Ocean) was allowed to partake in the competition as a late entrant; at the time, the EOI had already expired. Navantia too responded late to EOI in July 2019; despite the firm's belated response, the move indicated its reinterest in the project.

However, in September 2019, Saab announced that it would withdraw from the competition, stating that the SP policy placed more control over the construction of the submarines to the Indian partner than to the OEM; the firm argued that both responsibility and liability of the deal should lie with the OEM. Saab's withdrawal left the remaining five firms as the only contestants in the program; all five would be shortlisted by the MoD as strategic foreign partners in 2020.

=== Shortlisting (2020) ===
In January 2020, the Defence Acquisition Council (DAC) shortlisted two Indian shipyards and five foreign firms as the finalists in the project: MDL and L&T were chosen as the Indian finalists, while DSME, Naval Group, Navantia, TKMS and Rubin were chosen as the five foreign finalists. A year later, in July 2021, the MoD formally issued an RFP to the finalized contestants for the construction of the six submarines; however, due to the document's stringent conditions, the deadline of the RFP, which was initially scheduled for November 2021, was postponed to June 2022, and later again, to December 2022.

==== Foreign contenders ====
The five foreign firms shortlisted by the MoD in January 2020, are —

- France :- (Status: Disqualified in July 2021; withdrew in April 2022)
  - Naval Group: Offered a diesel-electric variant of the Barracuda-class nuclear attack submarine. Was also reported to have simultaneously offered an enhanced variant of the Scorpène-class submarine.
- Germany :- (Status: Qualified, as of July 2024)
  - ThyssenKrupp Marine Systems: Offered an enlarged 3000 t version of the Type 214 submarine. Had partnered with Mazagon Dock Limited for manufacturing in India.
- South Korea :- (Status: Withdrawn, as of June 2023)
  - Daewoo Shipbuilding and Marine Engineering: Offered a 3000 t variant of the KSS-III submarine, designated as the DSME-3000.
- Russia :- (Status: Disqualified in July 2021; withdrew in February 2022)
  - Rubin Design Bureau: Offered an export variant of the Amur-class submarine, designated as the Amur-1650.
- Spain :- (Status: Disqualified, as of January 2025)
  - Navantia: Offered the S-80 Plus submarine. Had partnered with Larsen & Toubro Shipbuilding for manufacturing in India.
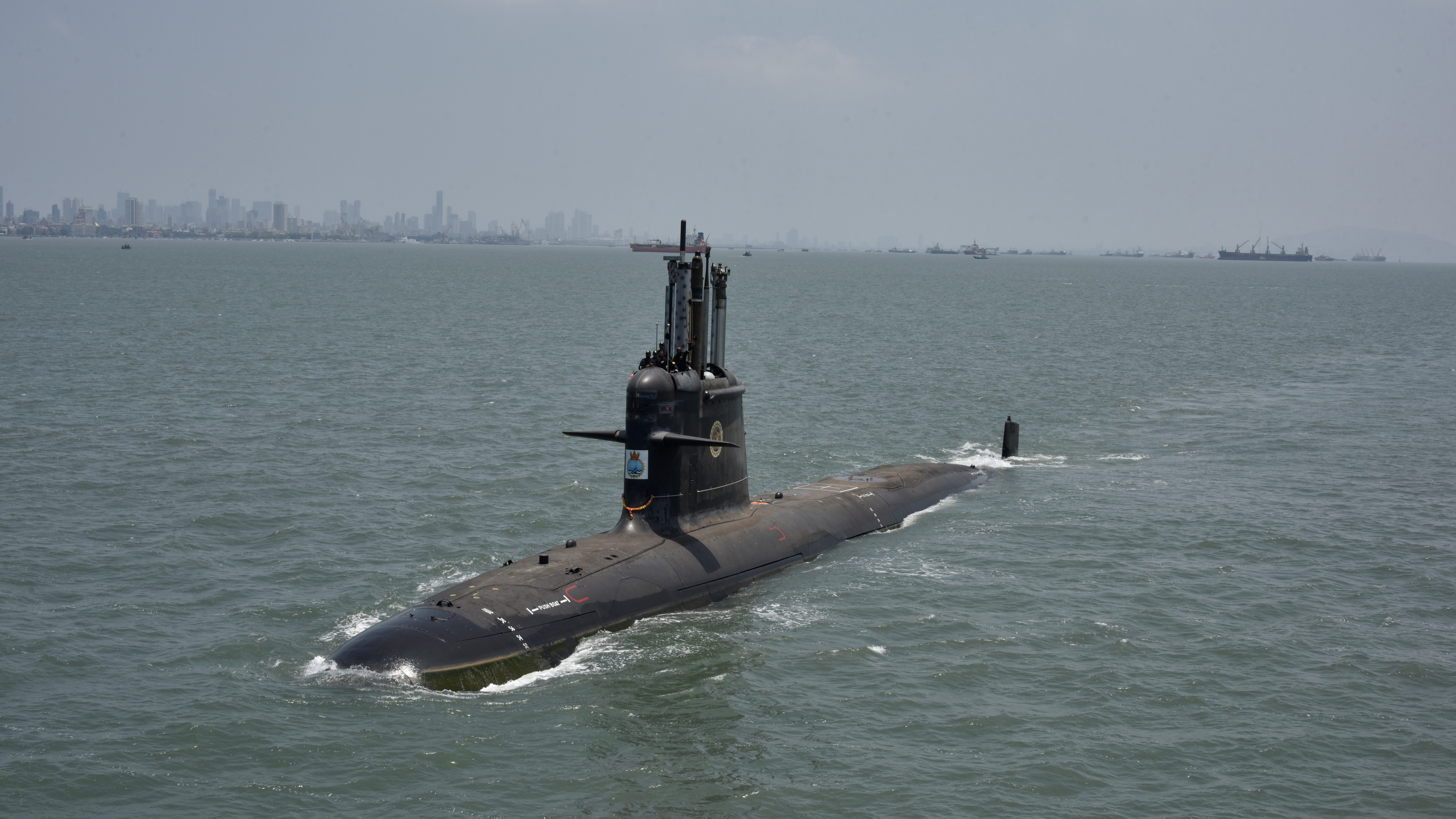
The Scorpène-class submarine offered by the Naval Group

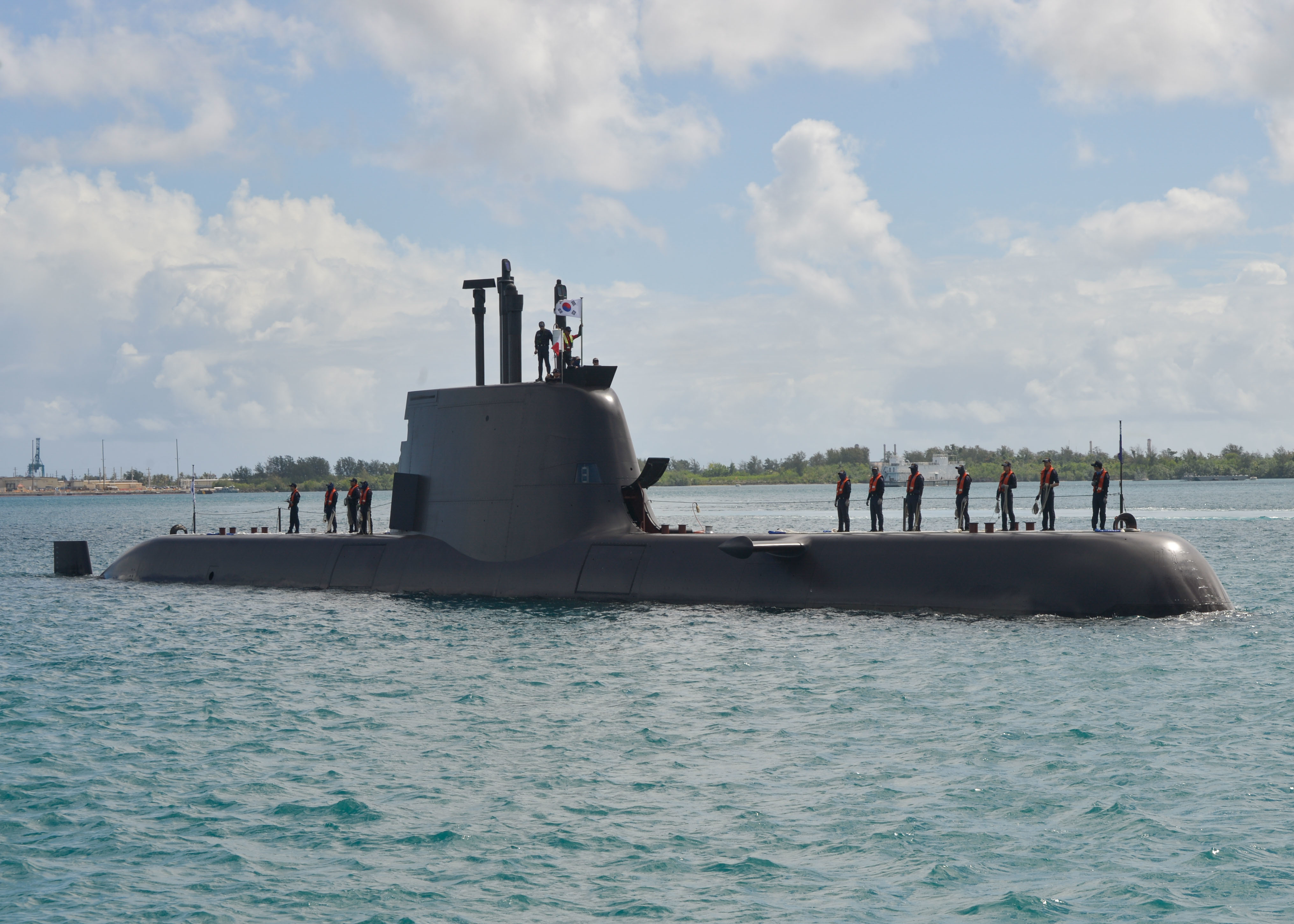
The Type 214 submarine offered by TKMS.

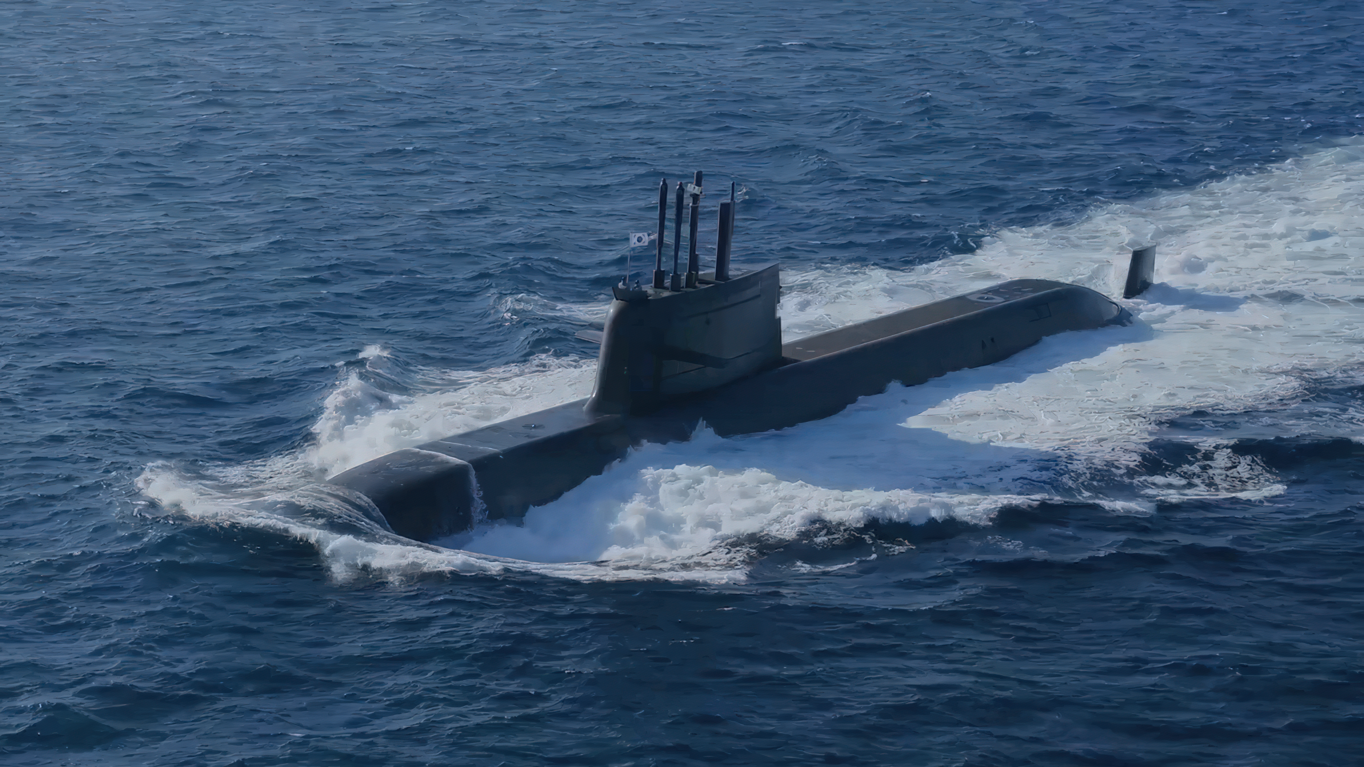
The KSS-III offered by DSME.

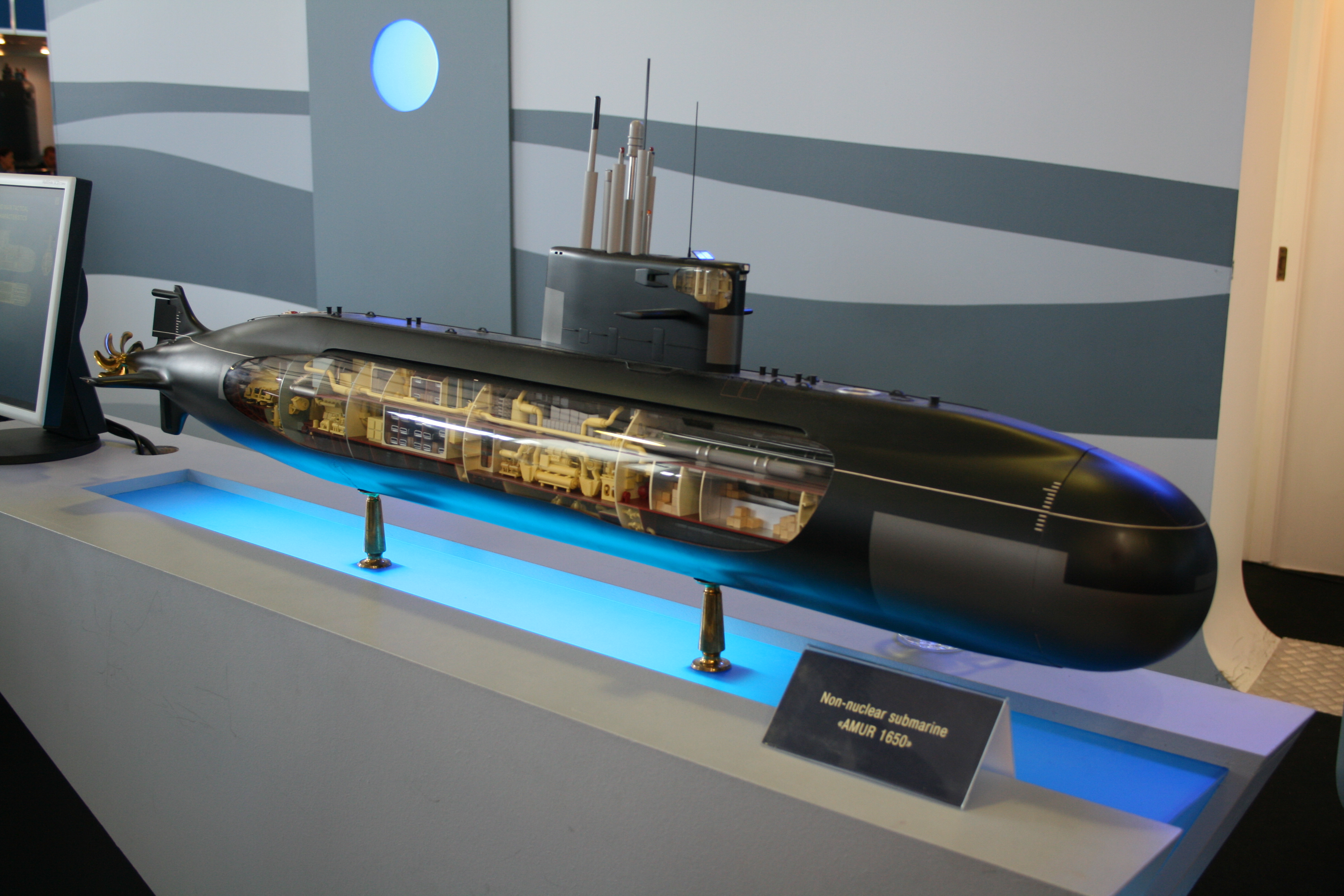
The Amur-1650 offered by Rubin

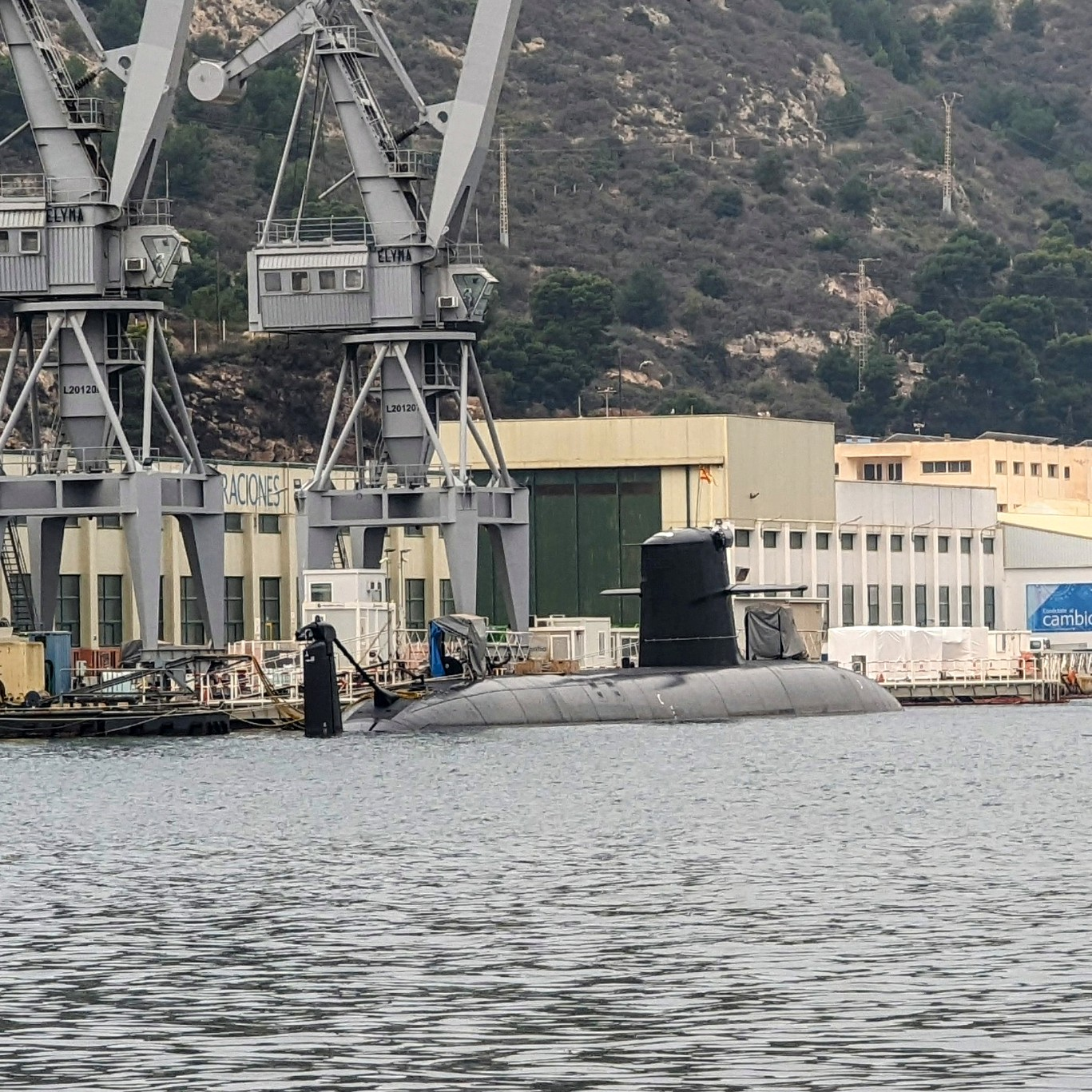
The S-80 Plus submarine offered by Navantia.

==== Local shipyards ====
The two Indian shipyards shortlisted by the MoD, are —

- India :-
  - Larsen & Toubro Shipbuilding: Has assisted in the development and construction of the Arihant-class nuclear-powered ballistic missile submarines, since 2009.
  - Mazagon Dock Shipbuilders Limited: Currently manufacturing six Scorpène-class attack submarines, under P-75, of which five have been delivered. The company was also involved in the licensed production of two Type 209/1500 attack submarines, between 1984 and 1994.

=== Post-shortlisting delays (2021–22) ===
In July 2021, MDL issued an RFI to the five foreign contenders with the objective of seeking a partner that possessed a functional AIP system, which had been tested and proved on operational submarine. Unfortunately, three of the five contenders, namely, France, Russia and Spain, did not possess any functional submarine equipped with a sea-proven AIP system, which led to them being disqualified from the competition. The disqualification of the aforementioned three thus left the remaining two contestants, Germany and South Korea, as the only ones with the eligibility to partake in the competition. Several observers defended MDL's AIP requirement, pointing out that the IN did not have an indigenously developed AIP in operational service and that the prospect of conceding to construct the P-75(I) submarines without AIP technology would be a retrogressive step.

In August 2021, TKMS withdrew from the program, citing an incapacity on its part to satisfy several conditions of the RFP, specifically the liability and technology transfer clauses in particular. TKMS complained about a "lack of flexibility" in the tender, arguing that the liability clause - which stipulated that the selected foreign firm would be identified as the sole responsible party for the submarines' construction - was too stringent. TKMS's decision to withdraw from the competition thus left DSME as the sole remaining contestant, which created a "single-vendor situation" - a condition in which only one firm would be able to comply with conditions of a multi-party competition, creating an atmosphere of non-competitiveness. The development thenceforth plunged the future of the program into uncertainty, as the MoD would have been compelled to scrap the tender to avoid such a non-competitive climacteric, in accordance with its 2020-issued defence-acquisition guidelines.

In February 2022, Rosoboronexport - Russia's state-controlled intermediary agency responsible for the export of the country's military equipment, announced that it had decided to withdraw from the competition, stating that it lacked the ability to comply with the RFP's requirements. However, the firm proposed a compensatory offer of Kilo-class submarines, which entailed the sale of upgraded Project 636 Kilos and already-decommissioned Project 877 Kilos as interim option to replenish the IN's submarine fleet. Russia's JSC United Shipbuilding Corporation previously made a similar offer to the IN in April 2020, offering to sell three refurbished Kilos.

In April 2022, Naval Group announced that it too would withdraw its participation, stating that it could not comply with the tender's parameters, which called for the supply of a fuel-cell AIP system.

Faced with the dual instances of either the foreign contestants being disqualified or withdrawing on their own accord, the MoD resorted to postpone the deadline of the tender thrice - from November 2021 to June 2022, then to December 2022 and again to August 2023. The deal was then expected to cost ₹43,000 crore (equivalent to ₹500 billion or US$5.2 billion in 2026).

=== Revival ===
==== 2023 ====
In February 2023, German and Indian sources reported that Germany had intended to resume its pursuit of the submarine deal, which was then-valued at $5.2 billion, during a two-day visit by German Chancellor Olaf Scholz to India. Notably, Scholz was also accompanied by Martina Merz, the CEO of ThyssenKrupp, who was part of the delegation which accompanied him during the visit. Soon after, The Hindu, an Indian daily-outlet, reported that Germany had planned to present a proposal to India for the sale of six submarine via an inter-governmental route. The report further stated that TKMS, which was in talks with L&T, had decided to partner with MDL.

In June 2023, during a two-day visit by German federal defence minister, Boris Pistorius, to India, TKMS and MDL signed a Memorandum of Understanding (MoU) to jointly bid for the P-75(I) deal, thus fulfilling the requirements of the SP acquisition policy. Although the financial value of the proposed deal wasn't revealed, the agreement stated that should the TKMS-MDL partnership secure the P-75(I) contract, the partnership would offer the Type 214 submarine - with TKMS being responsible for the engineering and design phases, while MDL being responsible for the construction and delivery of the submarines.

Concurrently, The Economic Times, another Indian daily-outlet, published a report that same month, stating that L&T Shipbuilding had teamed with Navantia to offer the S-80 Plus submarine. The report also stated that DSME, despite having been a qualified contender, had supposedly chosen to discontinue its participation in the competition, which thus implied TKMS-MDL and Navantia-L&T were the only contending blocs that remained. L&T and Navantia publicly announced their partnership with a teaming agreement in July 2023; under the terms of the agreement, should the Navantia-L&T alliance win the process, Navantia would be responsible designing the submarines, while L&T would be responsible for constructing them.

==== 2024 ====
Post an initial technical evaluation in February 2024, the IN declared the designs of both the Type 214 and the S-80 Plus to be technically compliant with its desired specifications. In March the same year, IN representatives conducted field evaluation trials (FET) on the Type 214 at TKMS' facilities at Kiel, Germany. Multiple sources later confirmed that the design had met the criteria specified by the tender; notably, reports also indicated that TKMS had offered the Type 212CD submarine, a design until recently deemed to be non-exportable. In addition, the reports also indicated that should the TKMS-MDL partnership be selected, the coalition would deliver the first submarine with 60% indigenous content (IC), a rise from the IN's set conditions of an initial 45% IC. Thereafter, the FET for the S-80 Plus design were completed by the IN at Navantia's facility at Cartagena in late-June 2024.

With the evaluation complete, the FET report is expected to be compiled and sent to the MoD after a period of two months, whereupon the bidding process shall commence. In August 2024, the IN reportedly informed MDL that its offer had passed the project's qualitative trial requirements, which possibly indicated that MDL's offer had a lead over that of L&T, which was also reported by similar sources to having "trial deviations".

As of December 2024, the report of the Technical Oversight Committee of the Indian Navy is expected to be submitted by the end of January 2025.

However, another report highlighted that the project could be delayed by over a year as a local competitor has raised "half-dozens of objections" as to whether proper procedures were followed during the trials. As per the report, "complaints ranged from alleged violations of proper procedures to unclear guidance about how to conduct the sea trials". Each complaint would be investigated by a committee before the project can move forward. This could also be an attempt to stall the project for "fear losing out".

The competitor was later identified to be L&T-Navantia. In response, a three-member technical oversight committee was created to evaluate the objections. The committee was headed by a Rear Admiral and had one Air Commodore and one Brigadier-rank officer as members. The committee, in early January 2025, submitted its report and concluded that "all due process was followed".

=== Selection and negotiations ===
In January 2025, media outlets citing government sources reported that the MoD had rejected the bid submitted by the L&T–Navantia alliance as their land-based AIP demonstration had not met the IN's criteria of a sea-proven AIP. Although the development wasn't officially confirmed by the MoD at the time, it expressed that the MDL–TKMS alliance was the only competitor that was deemed qualified. This was the second time in the IN's history that the service chose German-origin submarines, after the purchase of the Shishumar-class submarines in the 1980s which was also manufactured by MDL.

MDL had later confirmed that their commercial bid was opened by the MoD that month and that they had been invited to commence initial commercial negotiations with MoD's Cost Negotiation Committee. The future deal was expected to cost ₹70,000 crore (equivalent to ₹720 billion or US$7.5 billion in 2026), against the originally estimated ₹43,000 crore. The first submarine would be delivered within seven years after the signing of the contract.

As of 27 July 2025, negotiations for the acquisition, estimated at a cost of around ₹90,000 crore (equivalent to ₹930 billion or US$9.7 billion in 2026)−₹100,000 crore (equivalent to ₹1.0 trillion or US$11 billion in 2026), were expected to take up to a year. Thereafter, a proposal would be submitted to the Cabinet Committee on Security (CCS) by the end of the year, with the contract likely to be signed by next spring or within the current fiscal year after CCS approval. The higher cost of the submarines was attributed to the transfer of design and construction expertise, indigenisation of mission-critical systems, and cost escalations in Europe and India due to pandemic-era inflation. The production would begin from the third year of contract signing.

Meanwhile, reports indicated that the Indian Navy had also proposed a follow-on deal for three additional P-75(I) submarines instead of pursuing the P-75 (add-on) programme for three upgraded Scorpène-class submarines. If approved by the CCS, this follow-on deal could be finalised within a year of the first contract. Hence, no further orders for Scorpène submarines were anticipated. The Navy favoured the P-75(I) class due to its superior stealth, advanced capabilities, and the lack of an operational AIP system in the Scorpène, which is based on an older-generation design.

On 23 August 2025, following multiple delays, the CCS cleared the defence ministry and Mazagon Dock Shipbuilders to begin negotiations related to this project with their German counterparts in a high level meeting. The negotiations were expected to commence by the end of the month and conclude within six months thereafter. The negotiations between MDL and Indian procurement agencies begun only on 10 September.

On 3 September, Atlas Elektronik and its parent company, TKMS, signed a memorandum of understanding (MoU) with Hyderabad-based VEM Technologies. The agreement includes the development, production, integration, testing and modernization of heavyweight torpedoes for the programme. VEM will be assigned the role of integration and testing in India. The partnership later evolved into a teaming agreement between TKMS and VEM Technologies on 13 March 2026. This would allow the transfer of necessary technology and software license to enable production of the weapon systems in VEM's manufacturing facilities in India. The annual production rate is reportedly estimated at 500 units. Meanwhile, TKMS had also signed an agreement with Mumbai-based CFF Fluid Control Limited to jointly develop and manufacture advanced anti-submarine warfare systems for surface ships.

A report published on 14 October stated that the Indian Navy now considered the P-75I design ahead by a generation compared to the P-75 (add-on) design. While the government has not officially "scrapped" the latter, the project is not being pursued as per a top government official and its CCS clearance had been put on hold. The negotiations of P-75I is reportedly proceeding with an option clause for purchase of three similar submarines at a latter stage.

In December 2025, the Navy was expecting to finalise the contract and making the first tranche of payment by the end of the 2025–26 financial year, in March 2026. The design was reportedly in the last stages of finalisation. By 16 January 2026, the CNC completed the negotiation for the acquisition and the defence ministry was expected to seek approval from the CCS. The approval was expected within this fiscal year following consent from the finance department.

== Current status ==
As per reports, an inter-governmental agreement (IGA) had been signed during the visit of German Chancellor, Friedrich Merz, to India on 12 and 13 January 2026. The IGA is meant for long-term support, technology transfer, personnel training and administrative clearances and export clearance for the programme. The final contract, to be signed between MDL and the defence ministry, will be finalised by the end of March. The German defence minister, Boris Pistorius, will also visit India during the contract signing. The final deal is estimated at $10 billion.

As reported on 4 March, the deal will be worth ₹99,000 crore (equivalent to ₹1.0 trillion or US$11 billion in 2026). The defence ministry has already created and circulated the draft cabinet note. This will be followed by an approval by the Cabinet Committee on Security (CCS). During 21–23 April 2026, the Indian defence minister, Rajnath Singh, was on a state visit to Germany. On the second day of the visit, Boris Pistorius, explained that the contract was expected to be signed within 90 days. By 20 May, the contract is in the final stages of approval and could be sealed within few weeks following a scheduled inter-ministerial meeting. On 28 May, the union finance ministry cleared the deal. The CCS approval remained the only requirement before signing the deal, which is expected after the new Navy chief, Krishna Swaminathan takes charge from 31 May.

As per a 30 June report, the deal was expected to be concluded by September 2026 after the remaining approval process. The final CCS clearance is due of a recommendation from a government-appointed technical evaluation group, conducting a detailed assessment of the technology transfer package being offered by the TKMS. They will review the scope, depth and long-term value of the technologies proposed under the agreement since a significant part of the deal's value is committed to investment in technology transfer. The proposal is expected to be forwarded to CCS by August 2026.

On 13 October 2026, Hindustan Times reported that the deal was delayed, pending the validation of DRDO's AIP modules even though TKMS is ready to supply the same for the submarines. This restarted the proposals for acquiring the evolved Kalvari submarines to maintain force levels which was not being considered by the Indian Navy earlier.

== Design ==
According to media outlets, the design that TKMS had offered would be a customized design derived from the Type 214, but with a longer and more imposing hull designed to reduce acoustic footprint, as according to visual shown during the contest; the final design is yet to be publicly known. The new design is also expected to be used by the IN as reference for designing the future Project 76 submarines.

At present, it is known the that future design will include the following:
Displacement: 3,000 tonnes
Propulsion: Air-independent propulsion and diesel-electric propulsion.
Armament: 18 heavyweight torpedoes with at least 12 cruise missiles (land-attack and anti-ship)

== See also ==
References to the Indian Navy

- Submarines of the Indian Navy
- Future of the Indian Navy

Equivalent submarines of the same era

- Orka class
- Dakar class
