= Project 77-class submarine =

Indian class of nuclear-powered attack submarines under development

Class overview
- Name: Project 77
- Builders: Ship Building Centre, Visakhapatnam; Larsen & Toubro
- Operators: Indian Navy (Planned)
- Cost: ₹1.2 lakh crore (equivalent to ₹1.5 trillion or US$16 billion in 2026) total cost; ₹40,000 crore (equivalent to ₹430 billion or US$4.4 billion in 2026) for two (includes cost for establishing, infrastructure, equipments & associated machineries for new class of SSN).
- In commission: 2036 (planned)
- Planned: 2 cleared; 6 planned
- Active: 0

General characteristics
- Type: Nuclear attack submarine
- Displacement: 10,000 tonnes (9,800 long tons; 11,000 short tons)
- Propulsion: 1 × CLWR-B2 (Compact light-water reactor) 200 MW (270,000 hp); 35 MW (47,000 hp) Nuclear-Electric Propulsion (NEP) Turbine–electric powertrain; 1 × single shaft pump-jet propulsor
- Range: Unlimited except by food supplies
- Armament: Varunastra heavyweight torpedo, Electronic Heavy Weight Torpedo Takshak (EHWT), Nirbhay, BrahMos and BrahMos-II land-attack/anti-ship cruise missiles

Project 77 is an Indian Navy acquisition programme to procure nuclear-powered attack submarines.

== Background ==
In 1997, the Cabinet Committee on Security (CCS) — the final decision-making body of the Government of India on all matters of India's national security chaired by the Prime Minister — approved the construction of two Type 209/1500 attack submarines (SSK) at a then-estimated cost of INR ₹700 crore. This effort, which was conceived in the wake of an international corruption scandal related to India's acquisition of the Shishumar-class submarines, called for the construction of two Type 209/1500 SSKs at Mazagon Dock Shipbuilders Limited (MDL) with the assistance of a foreign naval firm in a corroborative role. In accordance with the scheme, the Indian Navy (IN) and MDL approached several naval enterprises for assistance; however, the French-based Thomson-CSF (TCSF) was the only firm willing to participate.

Two years later, on 12 July 1999, the Cabinet Committee on Security (CCS) approved a two-phase plan to build 24 submarines over a span of 30 years. The plan was named 'Project for Series Construction of Submarines for the Indian Navy and Acquisition of National Competence in Submarine Building', also referred as 'Submarine-building Perspective Plan'. For the first phase, six submarines each were to be built at MDL under Project 75 (P-75) along with a parallel production line of another public/private shipyard under Project-75 (India) or P-75(I) with technology transfer. Under the second phase, twelve submarines would be built including complete indigenous design, development and construction of submarines in India. While the first phase was scheduled for completion within 2012, the second phase would be executed in 2012–2030.

For the Project-75, two options emerged. The first being construction of the Type 209/1500 at MDL initially with the combat suite of TCSF with the rest being based on modified Scorpène submarine design based on Naval requirements. The second option recommended the construction of all the SSKs based on the newer Scorpène design. Ultimately, the Naval Heqadquarters chose the latter, reasoning that the Scorpène, which had been offered with a provision of technology transfer (TOT), was more advanced than the Type 209/1500. The initial plan to ally with TCSF was dropped in April 2001 and negotiations for the procurement of the Scorpène design under the first phase, dubbed Project-75 (P-75), began in November 2001. The Scorpène design was offered by another French-based naval firm, Armaris (later DCNS, now Naval Group). The P-75 contract signed on 6 October 2005 resulted in the construction of six Kalvari-class submarines beginning 23 May 2009. The final unit, INS Vagsheer (S26), was commissioned in January 2025.

Though the second batch of six submarines, under Project-75 (India), was to be executed simultaneously alongside P-75, financial constraints within the MoD led to P-75 being the only project sanctioned for six submarines. Proposals to move ahead with the acquisition failed twice after the project was approved in 2010 and 2014. Following delays, the Navy mandated the presence of an operational air-independent propulsion (AIP) plant with the submarine design. This was done to maintain the submarine's relevance in future as the boats' induction timeline was already delayed to 2022. The third approval from the Defence Acquisition Council (DAC), chaired by the Indian Minister of Defence, was accorded in January 2019. In January 2025, the bid by Larsen & Toubro to build S-80 Plus-class submarine, in collaboration with Spain's Navantia, was disqualified. Mazagon Dock's partnership with TKMS remained the only bidder who were thereafter invited for techno-commercial negotiations with the Indian Ministry of Defence. Negotiations were reported to have begun in July 2025 while the deal could be signed in January 2026.

The second phase of the plan was amended midway to maintain the relevance of the submarine fleets as per evolving threats. The program to construct and deploy a fleet of nuclear submarines was first envisaged in late 1990s was fast-tracked following growing patrols by the People's Liberation Army Navy ships. This included a solitary two-month "anti-piracy" patrol by a Type 093 submarine in the Indian Ocean before returning to Yulin Naval Base on 13 December 2013. On 12 February 2014, R&AW evaluations described the deployment as having significantly intensified India’s security concerns. The Navy has already acquired experience of operating nuclear submarines after leasing of INS Chakra (1987) and INS Chakra (2011) for three and nine years, respectively. The force has also ordered a third Chakra submarine for a lease of 10 years starting 2025. The submarine is expected to be delivered to India in 2028 following delays.

In February 2015, the Government of India through a Cabinet Committee on Security (CCS) approval, gave rise to another indigenous submarine project — the Project 75 Alpha (now Project 77). A fleet of six nuclear attack submarines, with a displacement of 6,000 tonnes, were to be built under the project. The design phase had begun by December 2017 with constructions to commence by 2023–24 and first unit to enter service in 2032. The preliminary design phase was completed by February 2020. In October 2024, the CCS cleared the construction of first two units in the Shipbuilding Centre (SBC), Visakhapatnam, of the Ministry of Defence where the Arihant-class submarines were built. The displacement was increased to 9,800 tonnes and equipped with 200 MWe-rated nuclear reactor.

With the approval of the Project 77, the number of boats under Project-76 was reduced to six units. The design was expected to inherit elements from the Project-75 and Project-75(I) designs. The development was cleared by defence ministry in June 2024 followed by a feasibility study conducted by DRDO. An approval from the Cabinet Committee on Security (CCS) for the further detailed design of the submarine is due as of February 2025.

Both Project 76 and Project 77 are being led by the Advanced Technology Vessel headquarters which is responsible for the development and construction of India's nuclear-powered, ballistic missile submarine fleet including Arihant class and S5-class submarines. While the final two submarines from the Arihant class is expected to be commissioned in early 2026 and 2027, respectively, the construction of first two units of S5 submarines has also begun in the Shipbuilding Centre (SBC), Visakhapatnam.

== Development ==
The Government of India, through the Cabinet Committee on Security (CCS), approved the construction of six nuclear attack submarines on 18 February 2015. Following the approval, the Naval Staff Qualitative Requirements (NSQR) are to be ascertained for the over 6,000 tonne-displacement submarines. These are to be built at the Ship Building Centre at Visakhapatnam. On 8 December 2017, Navy chief, Admiral Sunil Lanba, announced that the design for the class of six submarines had commenced at the newly commissioned Submarine Design Centre, Gurgaon. The project cost was estimated at ₹60,000 crore (equivalent to ₹920 billion or US$9.5 billion in 2026). These will be designed by the Navy's in-house Directorate of Naval Design (now Warship Design Bureau). The construction was expected to commence on 2023–24 while the first submarine is expected to enter service in 2032.

On 24 June 2019, it was reported that ₹100 crore (US$10 million) have been allocated for the initial phase of the project. The development is expected to continue till 2025. Mishra Dhatu Nigam is developing a new hull material that is expected to allow the submarine to dive to deeper depths than Arihant class. A scaled down model of the submarine is planned to be tested first. The total cost of the project is now estimated to be around ₹1 lakh crore (equivalent to ₹1.3 trillion or US$13 billion in 2026).

In February 2020, The Economic Times reported that the preliminary design phase of the programme has been successfully completed. The report stated that Submarine Design Group of the Directorate of Naval Design, assisted by the DRDO, will now start working on the detailed design and construction phase of the programme.

As of March 2021, it was reported that the Indian Navy has prioritised the construction of Project 75 Alpha submarines over a planned third aircraft carrier. Later it was announced that initially, three submarines will be cleared in 2023-24 while the remaining three will get clearance later. The first boat was expected to roll out in 2032. The ship class will have a final design clearance in Gurugram by Submarine Design Group, its nuclear reactor will be built in Kalpakkam, hull fabrication will be undertaken by Larsen & Toubro at Hazira and finally assembly and sea trials will be conducted by the Ship Building Centre (SBC) in Visakhapatnam.

As of August 2024, a report suggested that the first batch of P-75A class will have 2 submarines, while 4 more will be cleared in a later phase. The final clearance for the 1st batch worth ₹40,000 crore (US$4.2 billion) is expected to be received "soon" from the Cabinet Committee on Security (CCS).

On 9 October 2024, the CCS cleared the project at ₹40,000 crore (equivalent to ₹430 billion or US$4.4 billion in 2026) to construct 2 nuclear attack submarines for the Indian Navy. The submarines shall be built at Ship Building Centre in Visakhapatnam and will include major private sector firms including Larsen & Toubro. According to reports, the first submarine will take 10–12 years to be launched with a 190 MW pressurised light-water reactor and a displacement of almost 10,000-tonnes. The maximum speed will be over 30 kn (56 km/h; 35 mph). The submarines will feature an indigenous content of 95% and foreign assistance will include design consultancy only.

During a press conference, the Indian Navy confirmed that it plans to operate 6 SSNs in total. The first of the initial two submarines is to be completed by 2036-37 followed by the next in 2038-39. The submarines are anticipated to be equipped with DRDO-developed hypersonic missiles and an upgraded BrahMos, which might have a strike range of 1,500–2,000 kilometers.

In September 2025, the Times of India reported that the Bhabha Atomic Research Centre (BARC) is developing a 200 MWe-rated nuclear reactor for the Indian Navy's next-generation nuclear submarines, including Project 77 and S5-class submarines.

== See also ==
- Submarines of the Indian Navy
- Future of the Indian Navy
