= Yalong =

Yalong may refer to:

- Yalong River, river in China
- Yalong Bay, bay in Hainan, China
- Geylang, a district in Singapore, transliterated in Chinese as Yalong
