= Naval Materials Research Laboratory =

Indian defense laboratory

- Established: 1953
- Director: Shri Prashant T Rojatkar
- Location: Shil Badlapur Rd., MIDC Area, Ambernath- 421506, District Thane, Maharashtra, Ambernath, Maharashtra
- Operating agency: DRDO
- Website: NMRL Home Page

Naval Materials Research Laboratory (NMRL) is an Indian defence laboratory of the Defence Research and Development Organisation (DRDO). Located at Ambernath, in Thane district, Maharashtra. It develops materials and alloys for Naval use, and is a single-window agency for all materials requirement of the Indian Navy. NMRL is organized under the Naval Research & Development Directorate of DRDO. The present director of NMRL is Shri Prashant T Rojatkar.

== History ==
NMRL was established in 1953 as the Naval Chemical and Metallurgical Laboratory, an in-house laboratory of the Navy, located at the Naval Dockyard, Mumbai. It was brought under the administrative control of DRDO in the early 1960s. The laboratory is located in its own technical-cum residential complex at Ambernath, Maharashtra. The laboratory still has its erstwhile infrastructure intact in Naval Dockyard, Mumbai, without any physical scientific or administrative presence.

== Areas of work ==
- Fuel Cell Power Pack Technology
- Advanced Protection Technology in Marine Environment
- Electrochemistry & Electrochemical Processes
- Polymer and Elastomer Science and Technology including Stealth Material
- Processing Technologies for Speciality Metallic and Non-metallic Materials
- Chemical and Biological Control of Marine Environment

== Projects and products ==
=== Phosphoric Acid Fuel Cell-based AIP system ===
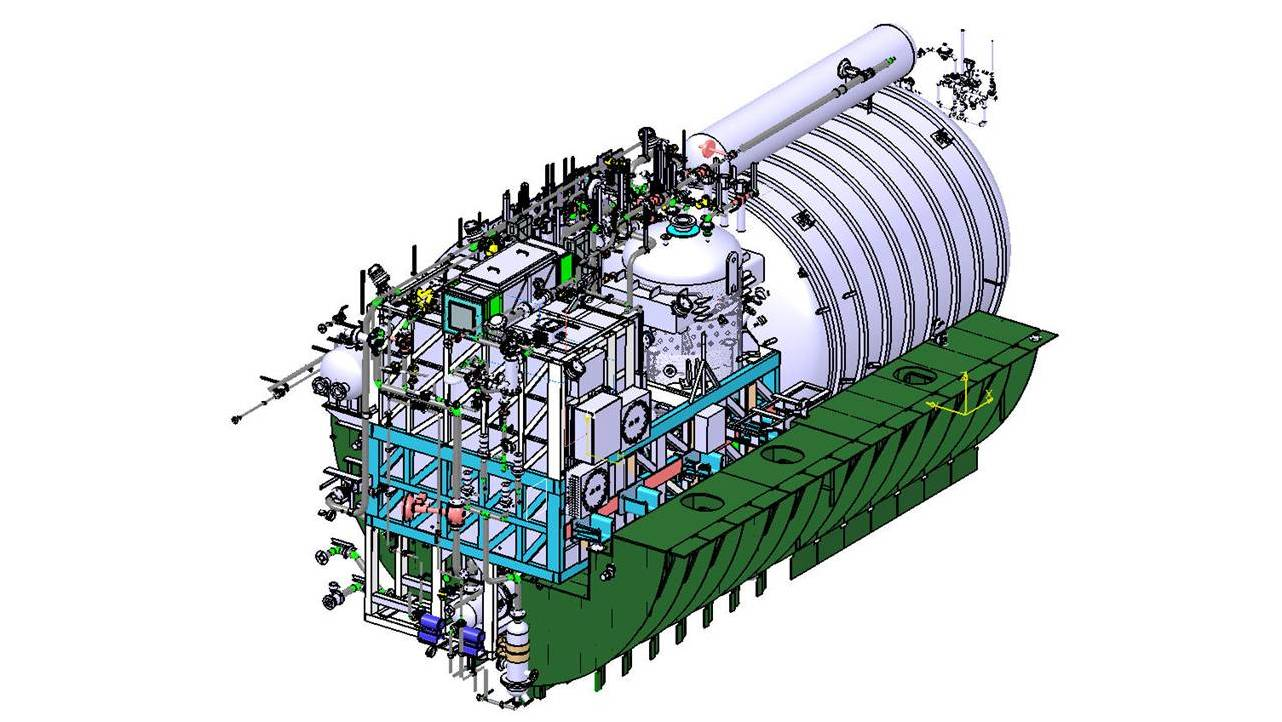
A visual of the NMRL-design air-independent propulsion module that is to be equipped on the submarines

The six Kalvari-class submarines are expected to retro-fitted with the DRDO-developed air-independent propulsion (AIP) modules during their respective mid-life refits, starting with Kalvari in 2024. The retrofit will involve cutting the submarine’s pressure hull and inserting a new hull section housing the air-independent propulsion system or the Energy Module. This increases the submarine’s overall length and displacement. This requires some design changes in the submarines which will be conducted by the Naval Group.

However, the development was delayed and Khanderi will be the first submarine to be equipped with the AIP system. The DRDO expects to deliver the Energy Module to the Navy within three to four months. The refit scheduled from July 2026 and the integration is expected to take three months and will be completed by December 2026. This would be followed by initial sea trials commencing in July–August 2027 with the full refit process to conclude by early-2028. The system has already reached advanced stages of trials.

Design: The Naval Materials Research Laboratory (NMRL) is the primary designing agency, with Suman Roy Choudhury being the programme director, AIP, NMRL. Larsen & Toubro (L&T) is the development and production partner. Thermax is also an industry partner. The Energy Modules are the core component of the AIP system. The modules are composed of phosphoric acid fuel cells (PAFC) and the on-board Hydrogen generation system. The hydrogen generation system excludes the need of hydrogen storage and the by-product is non-polluted water which is to be released into the oceans. This feature is unique to this design. The overall AIP is a stack of 24 phosphoric acid fuel cells (PAFC) with each cell generating 13.5 kW (18.1 hp) of power. The design results in a power output which is greater than the overall requirement. The system will provide an enhanced submerged endurance of about 14 days in endurance mode and 2 days in power mode. However, without the AIP system, the maximum endurance of the Kalvari design is two to four days.

A variant will also be developed for the Project 76 submarines, where the module's current power output would be enhanced to around 20 kW (27 hp) in order to meet the power requirements.

Development timeline:

- June 2014: An initial fund of ₹177.72 crore (US$29.12 million) had been allocated for the development of an AIP system and a deliverable LOX delivery system for the P75 submarines. This was reported in a Press Information Bureau (PIB) document dated to 2017.
- May 2016: The initial plan was to integrate the propulsion system into the final two of the Kalvari submarines. The DCNS had also offered its second-generation hydrogen fuel cell AIP system, the successor to the MESMA AIP, to be fitted onto DRDO's AIP plug. If accepted, the design would be ready for trials by February 2017.
- 8 March 2021: DRDO conducted the maiden test of the land-based prototype (LBP) of the system. As per a release, "The plant was operated in endurance mode and max power mode as per the user requirements". The operationalisation of the complete AIP system was expected in 2023–24. Meanwhile, the fitment of the system onboard the submarines will begin at a rate of one per year when the first submarine, Kalvari, begins it refit in 2024–25. Fitment of the system would take 2–3 years.
- February 2021: Larsen & Toubro (L&T) received the technology transfer approval for production from the defence ministry during the Aero India 2021.
- 24 January 2023: The timeline was already delayed with the second last submarine being commissioned into the Navy. Then, the AIP modules would be retrofitted into the submarines beginning from the first unit, Kalvari, under the oversight of the Naval Group. This will now be followed by detailed design certification of the energy module along with the industrial partners.
- 10 February 2023: The systems was in developmental trial phase.
- 22 June 2023: L&T and DRDO signed a contract to manufacture two units of Air Independent Propulsion (AIP) System Modules. The manufacturing, integration and factory acceptance trials of the Energy Modules (EMs) will be conducted at L&T's AM Naik Heavy Engineering Complex at Surat. The EMs will be delivered for integration into the AIP Plug followed by integration into the first submarine.
- July 2024: The AIP module was being manufactured and would undergo testing in AIP Integration and Testing facility through a year. The testing facility was inaugurated on 6 July. Kalvari was expected to be retrofitted with the system in September 2025. The shore-based prototype has undergone extensive trials and has been demonstrated to the Navy.
- 28 December 2024: L&T undertook the steel cutting ceremony of the AIP system at its Hazira facility. Samir V. Kamat, the chairman of DRDO and the secretary of Department of Defence Research & Development (DDR&D), was also present.
- 30 December 2024: Mazagon Dock received a contract, worth ₹1,990 crore (equivalent to ₹21 billion or US$220 million in 2026), for the fabrication of AIP Plug and its integration into the submarines.
- August 2025: Further delays were reported which implied Kalvari would not be fitted with the system during its refit. The Khanderi would now be the first unit to be equipped with the system during its refit in 2026. The AIP would be ready by December 2026.
- March 2026: Reports confirmed that Khanderi will be the first submarine to be equipped with the AIP system. The DRDO expects to deliver the Energy Module to the Navy within three to four months. The refit is scheduled from July 2026 and the integration is expected to take three months and will be completed by December 2026. This would be followed by initial sea trials commencing in July–August 2027 with the full refit process to conclude by early-2028. The systems has already reached advanced stages of trials.
- April 2026: INOX India Ltd flagged off a Simulated LOX Storage Module from the INOXCVA facility for Factory Acceptance Tests.
- 24 October 2026: The NMRL inaugurated the Setting to Work (STW) Phase-2 activity of the AIP Energy module at the AM Naik Heavy Engineering Complex at L&T Hazira, Gujarat. Thereafter, the AIP Energy Module will be energised for power production and rigorous testing as per Indian Navy's protocols before delivery to Mazagon Dockyards commences for integration with Kalvari-class submarines in early 2027.

=== Technologies for civilian use ===
- Bio-emulsifier - for Bio-remediation of floating oil.
- Arsenic removal kit - NMRL has developed a low-cost arsenic removal filter to remove arsenic from contaminated drinking water. The filter is made of stainless steel, and the filter medium is a processed waste of the steel industry. The filter works on the principle of co-precipitation and adsorption, which is followed by filtration through treated sand. The complete filter costs Rs. 500, has a life of 5 years and does not require any electricity to run. After six months of testing in 24 Paraganas district in West Bengal, the technology was given to NGOs for productionizing.
