= Yalong Bay Forest Park Glass Bridge =

Zhangjiajie Glass Bridge 三亚亚龙湾森林公园玻璃栈道
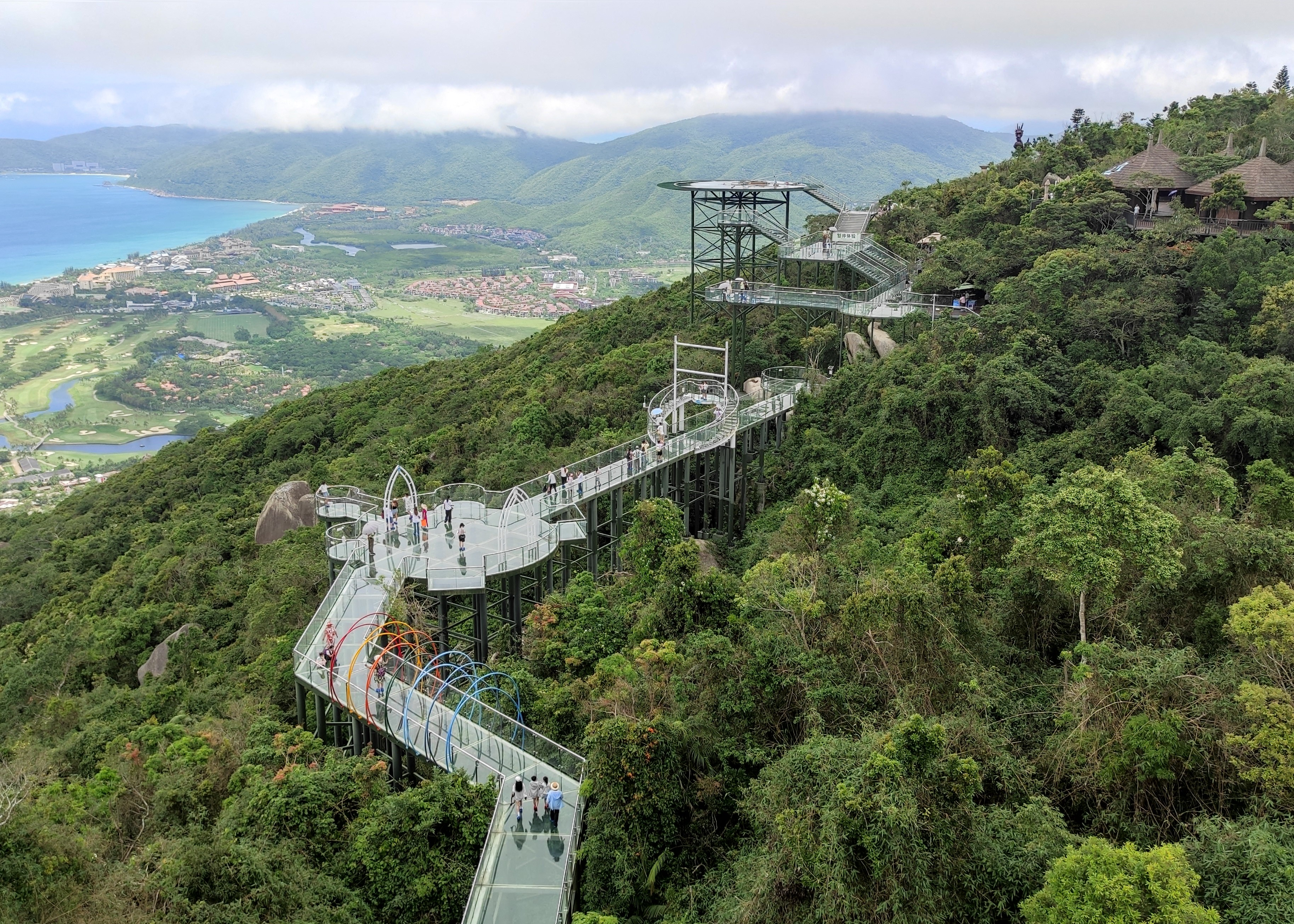
- Carries: Footbridge
- Locale: Sanya, Hainan, China

Characteristics
- Material: Tempered glass and metal
- Total length: 400 metres

History
- Opened: August 2018

The Yalong Bay Forest Park Glass Bridge (三亚亚龙湾森林公园玻璃栈道) is a glass bridge overlooking Yalong Bay, in Sanya, Hainan, China. It is located in the Yalong Bay Tropical Paradise Forest Park, is 400-meters-long, and is a tourist attraction.

It is the first glass bridge in Hainan and is made of tempered glass 30mm thick. The bridge can support loads of up to 1000 kg per sq. m. The highest point above the ground below is 100 metres.
