= Longpo Naval Base =

Chinese underground submarine base in Hainan

Coordinates: 18°12′10″N 109°41′41″E

Longpo Naval Base 龙坡海军基地
- Yalong Bay, Sanya, Hainan, China
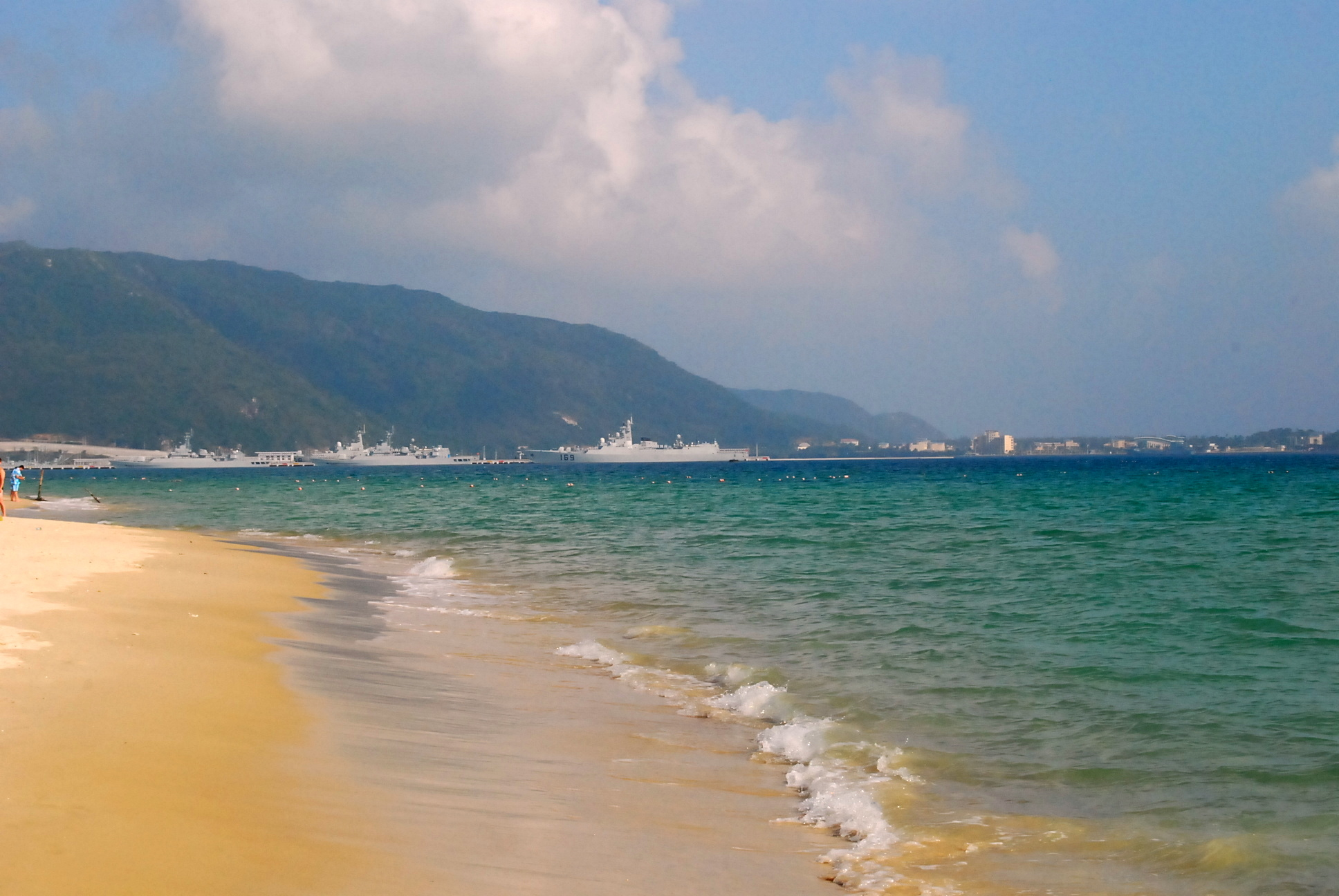
- The base viewed from the Yalong Bay Beach

Site information
- Type: Military base
- Controlled by: PLA Navy

Site history
- In use: 1955 – Present

Longpo Naval Base (Chinese: 龙坡海军基地), also known as East Yulin Naval Base, is a naval base for nuclear submarines along the southern coast of Hainan Island, China. This underground base has been reported by several intelligence agencies. The images collected by the Federation of American Scientists (FAS) in February 2008 shows that China constructed a large scale underground base for its naval forces. In August 2020, satellite imagery from Planet Labs appeared to show a Shang-class submarine entering the underground base.

== Description ==
The caverns are capable of hiding up to 20 nuclear submarines based on reconnaissance satellites data collected. The harbor houses nuclear ballistic missile submarines and is large enough to accommodate aircraft carriers. The US Department of Defense estimated that China would have five Type 094 nuclear submarines operational by 2010 with each capable of carrying 12 JL-2 intercontinental ballistic missiles. Two 950 metre piers and three smaller ones would be enough to accommodate two carrier strike groups or amphibious assault ships.

== Location ==
The submarine base is located at the point in Chinese territory that is closest to the continental shelf. It is roughly 50 nautical miles (93 km) from the base to the 200 meter isobath. It is 150 nautical miles (280 km) to the closest of the disputed Paracel Islands or the city of Da Nang, Vietnam. Speculation has been raised that the base is intended to be expanded to include future capability for aircraft carrier groups.

The submarine base is only a few miles from the city of Sanya, a popular tourist destination and the site of a major planned cruise hub. The base is immediately next to the Yalong Bay National Resort District featuring many resort hotels.

== See also ==
- Jianggezhuang Naval Base, nuclear submarine base in Qingdao
- Yulin Naval Base, traditional base in Sanya
