= Kalvari-class submarine =

Kalvari-class submarine may refer to:

- Kalvari-class submarine (1967), Foxtrot-class submarines built for the Indian Navy in 1960s
- Kalvari-class submarine (2015), Scorpène-class submarines built for the Indian Navy since 2010s
