= Martina Merz =

German engineer and CEO

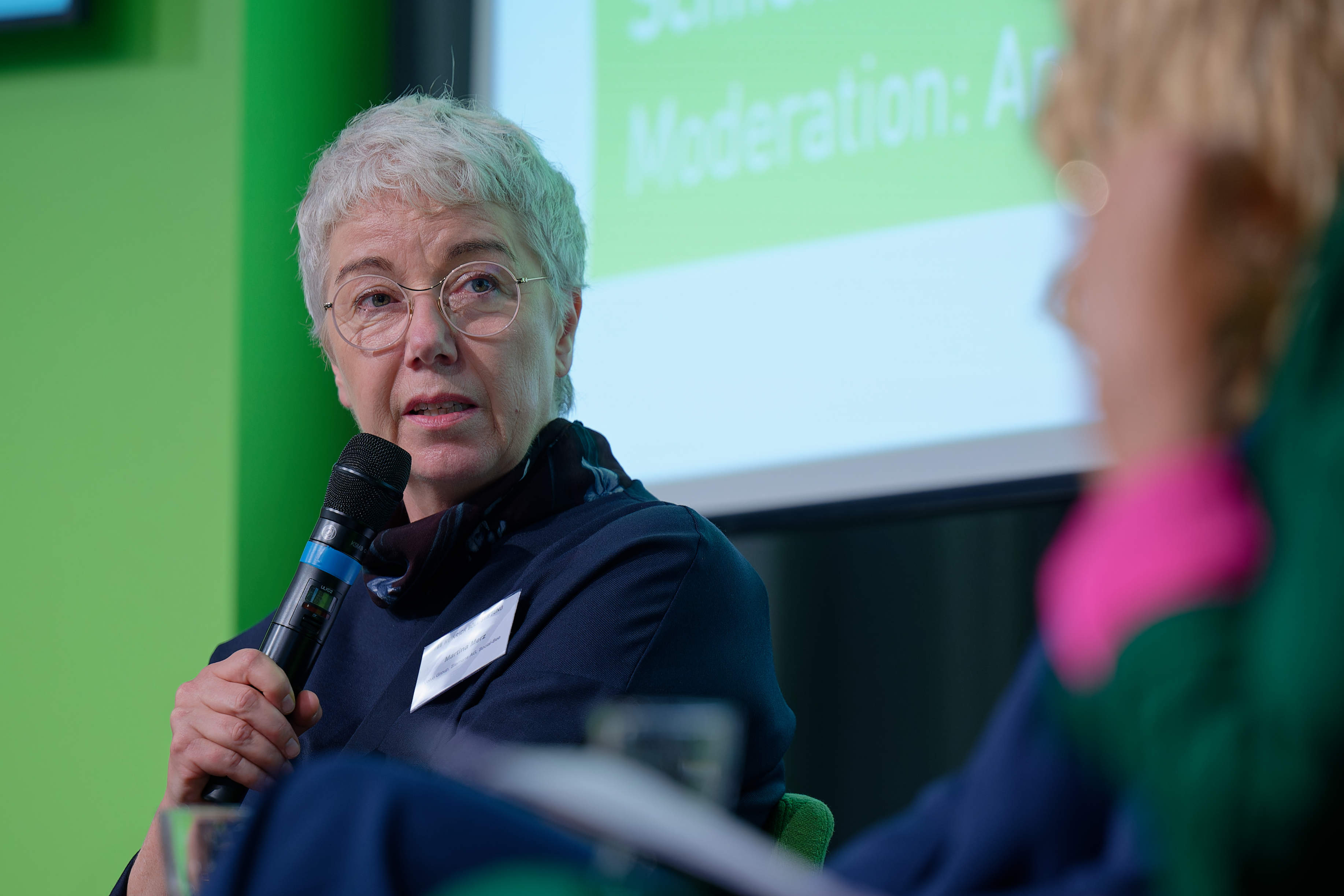
Prof. Martina Merz

Martina Merz (born March 1, 1963), is a German engineer who was Chief executive officer (CEO) of ThyssenKrupp from 2019 to 2023, and has been called "the most powerful woman in the German economy".

== Early life and education ==
Merz studied manufacturing engineering and holds a Bachelor of Science from Baden-Württemberg Cooperative State University in Stuttgart.

== Career ==
Merz started her career in 1985, taking up different management positions at Robert Bosch GmbH. In 2002, she joined Brose Fahrzeugteile as Executive Vice President, and returned to Bosch in 2005. From 2012, Merz worked as Chief Executive Officer (CEO) for Chassis Brakes International. From 2015 to 2019, Merz worked as an independent business consultant with memberships in the supervisory boards of Lufthansa, SAF-Holland, Imerys and Volvo.

In February 2019, Merz was elected Chairwoman of the Supervisory Board of thyssenkrupp AG. Merz was CEO of ThyssenKrupp from October 1, 2019, following a series of profit warnings. Apart from selling the elevator business, several smaller business units were divested or closed as part of her restructuring efforts. However, her tenure saw Thyssenkrupp's share price fall by nearly half.

== Other activities ==
=== Corporate boards ===
- Bosch, Member of the Supervisory Board (since 2025)
- Imerys, Member of the Board of Directors
- Volvo, Member of the Supervisory Board (since 2015)
- SAF-Holland, Member of Board of the Directors
- Bekaert, Member of the Board of Directors (2016-2019)
- Lufthansa, Member of the Supervisory Board (2016-2020)

=== Non-profit organizations ===
- Federation of German Industries (BDI), Member of the Presidium (since 2021)
- Baden-Badener Unternehmer-Gespräche (BBUG), Member of the Board of Trustees (since 2021)
- European Round Table of Industrialists (ERT), Member
