= Kalvari =

Kalvari كلواري
- Village
- Location within Iran
- Coordinates: 31°35′38″N 50°34′42″E
- Country: Iran
- Province: Chaharmahal and Bakhtiari
- County: Lordegan
- Bakhsh: Manj
- Rural District: Manj

Population (2006)
  - Total: 88
- Time zone: UTC+3:30 (IRST)
  - Summer (DST): UTC+4:30 (IRDT)

Kalvari (Persian: كلواري, also Romanized as Kalvārī) is a village in Manj Rural District, Manj District, Lordegan County, Chaharmahal and Bakhtiari Province, Iran. At the 2006 census, its population was 88, in 15 families. The village is populated by Lurs.
