= Indian Navy Swimmer Delivery Vehicle =

Planned class of submarine for the Indian Navy

Class overview
- Name: Swimmer Delivery Vehicle
- Operators: Indian Navy
- Planned: 2

General characteristics
- Type: Midget submarine
- Displacement: 150 tonnes
- Propulsion: Diesel-electric

The Indian Navy Swimmer Delivery Vehicle (SDV), also known as Special Operations Vessels (SOV) is a planned class of midget submarines for the Indian Navy. Under this programme the Indian Navy will acquire at least 5 midget submarines for use as Swimmer Delivery Vehicles. These submarines will be used for conducting underwater special operations by MARCOS.

In the initial phase, Indian Navy will acquire 2 midget submarines from an Indian shipyard which will be again followed by larger orders of at least 3 more similar submarines. The total order quantity may also reach 10 units.

== History ==
The requirement of more than 5 midget submarines for the Indian Navy was first revealed in 2009 after the 2008 Mumbai attacks.

In October 2014, the clearance for construction of 2 midget submarines under this programme was approved by Defence Acquisition Council (DAC) along with the P-75I submarine programme. The project is worth ₹2,000 crore (equivalent to ₹32 billion or US$330 million in 2023). The submarines is to have a displacement of about 150 tonnes and carry 8-24 MARCOS operators. The submarines will be designed such that the commandos can eject out of the vessel on reaching near the target and after completion of their mission they shall swim back to the vessel.

By 2016, Hindustan Shipyard Limited (HSL) was nominated as constructor for the midget submarines worth ₹3,000 crore (equivalent to ₹43 billion or US$450 million in 2023). The Request for Proposal (RfP) was to be notified in a few months. Upon signing the contract, the delivery was to begin within 3 years. However, there were complaints from other shipyards for the fact that HSL won the tender without competition. HSL was expected to seek foreign expertise for midget submarine construction when officially the tender is awarded to HSL.

== Development ==
As of 2024, a final deal for the midget submarine has not been signed. Some similar projects are in the design or prototype production stage by other Indian Original Equipment Manufacturers (OEM).

=== Larsen & Toubro (SOV-400) ===
Class overview
- Name: SOV-400
- Builders: Larsen & Toubro

General characteristics
- Type: Midget submarine
- Displacement: 550 tonnes (540 long tons)
- Length: 44 m (144 ft 4 in)
- Beam: 4.3 m (14 ft 1 in)
- Propulsion: 2 × 400 kW diesel generators and 1 × 300 kW electric motor
- Speed: Surfaced: >6 knots (11 km/h; 6.9 mph); Submerged: >10 knots (19 km/h; 12 mph)
- Endurance: 21 days
- Test depth: 100 metres (330 ft)
- Complement: 10 crew + 10 operators
- Armament: 2 × 533 mm (21 in) torpedo tubes

Larsen & Toubro has designed SOV-400 midget submarine which was revealed for the first time at Defence Exposition 2022. The SOV-400 submarine has a design displacement of 550 tons. The vessel will have a capacity of 10 Special Forces (MARCOS) operators. Further, 2 smaller Swimmer Delivery Vehicles of 4-person capacity are attached to the sides of the hull. The larger submarine will be armed with 2 533 mm (21 in) torpedo tubes along with sonar devices for navigation. The development had begun in 2017, though fine tuning the design and further upgradation are still underway.

=== Mazagon Dockyard (MS-X02A) ===
Mazagon Dock Shipbuilders Limited (MDL) completed their design of stealth midget submarines in 2022 and started their scaled-down prototype development. The scaled-down prototype was officially revealed in 2024.

On 14 May 2024, the scaled-down prototype named Arowana (designated MS-X02A) was launched by the then Defence Secretary Giridhar Aramane from the yard Y-51008 in Mumbai. The launch date coincided with the 250th Foundation Day of MDL. This is the first submarine to be designed indigenously in India. The submarine is equipped with Sonar, GPS, and Inertial Navigation System and state-of-the-art communication system. The submarine. It has a capacity a "pilot", a "co-pilot", along with a fully equipped "combat swimming team". The launch will be followed by rigorous developmental trials and testing and user trials. Necessary improvements will be implemented in the following prototypes.

== See also ==
=== Similar Systems in Operation ===
- Cosmos Class Submarine - Pakistan Navy
- Ghadir-class submarine - Islamic Republic of Iran Navy
