= Yalong Bay =

Bay in Hainan, China

Coordinates: 18°12′39″N 109°39′16″E

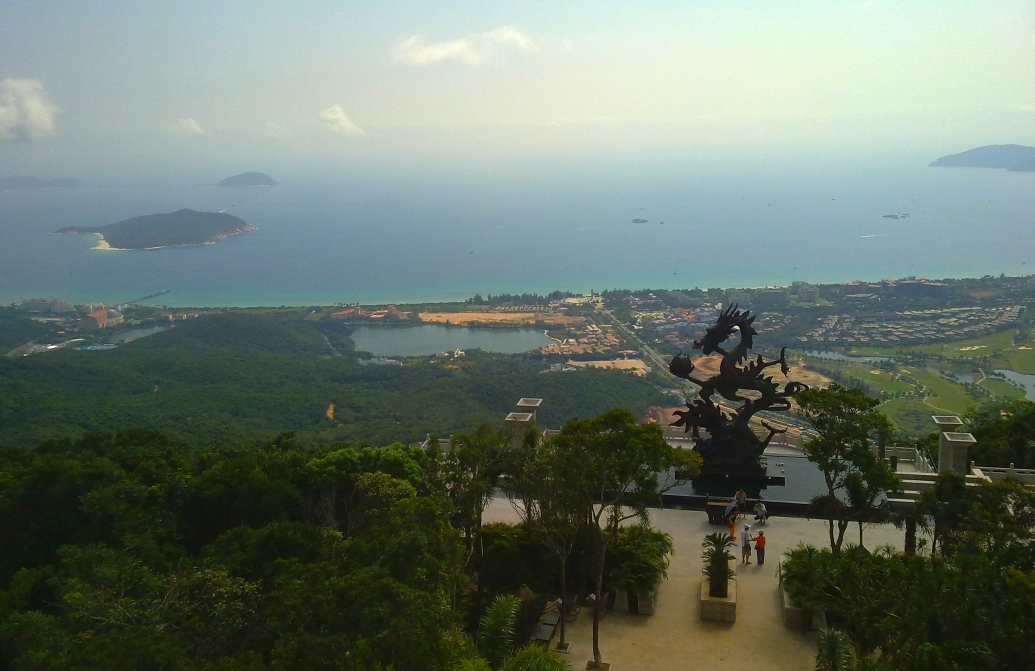
- A view of Yalong Bay
- Simplified Chinese: 亚龙湾
- Traditional Chinese: 亞龍灣
Transcriptions
Standard Mandarin
- Hanyu Pinyin: Yàlóng Wān

sometimes written as
- Simplified Chinese: 牙龙湾
- Traditional Chinese: 牙龍灣
Transcriptions
Standard Mandarin
- Hanyu Pinyin: Yálóng Wān

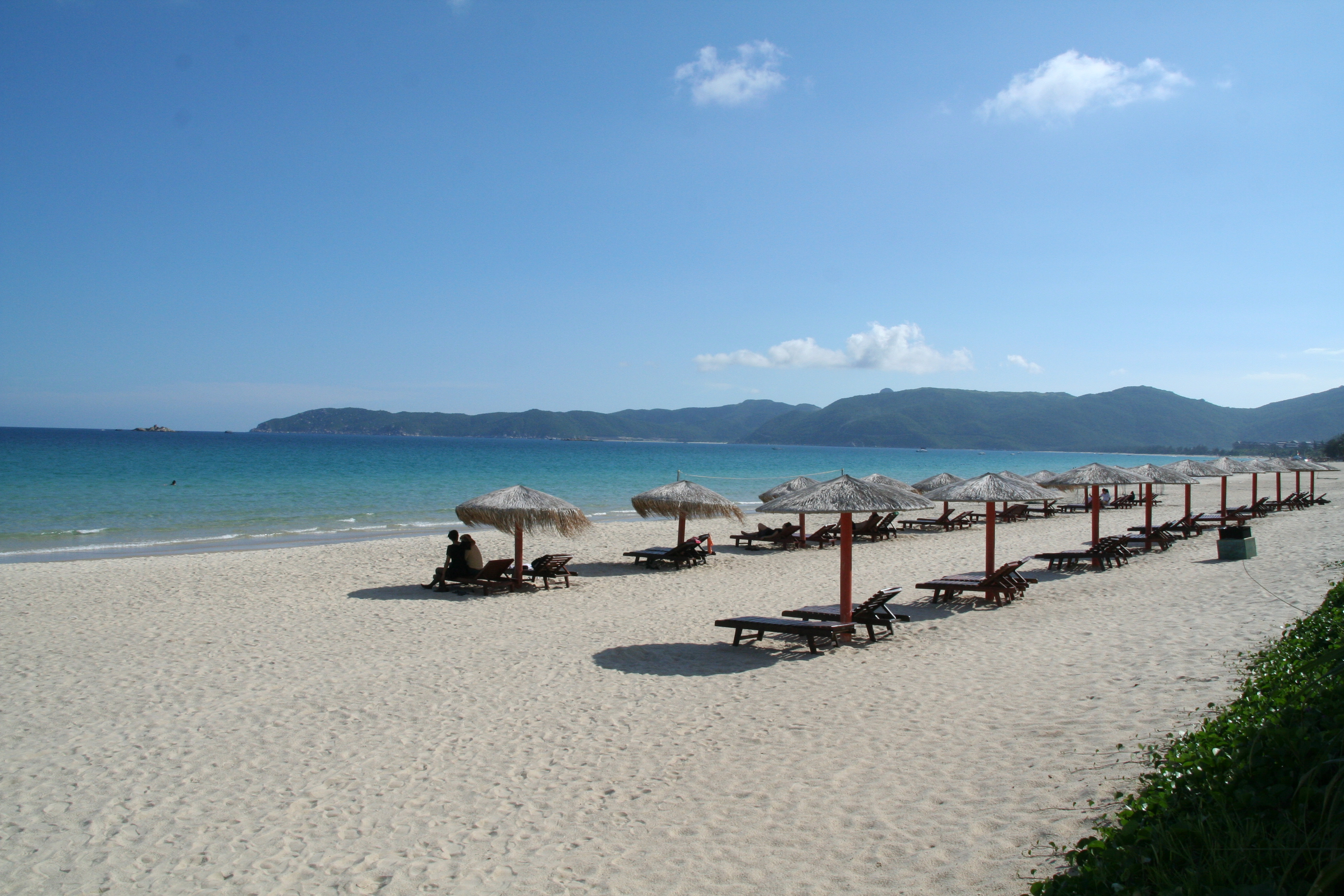
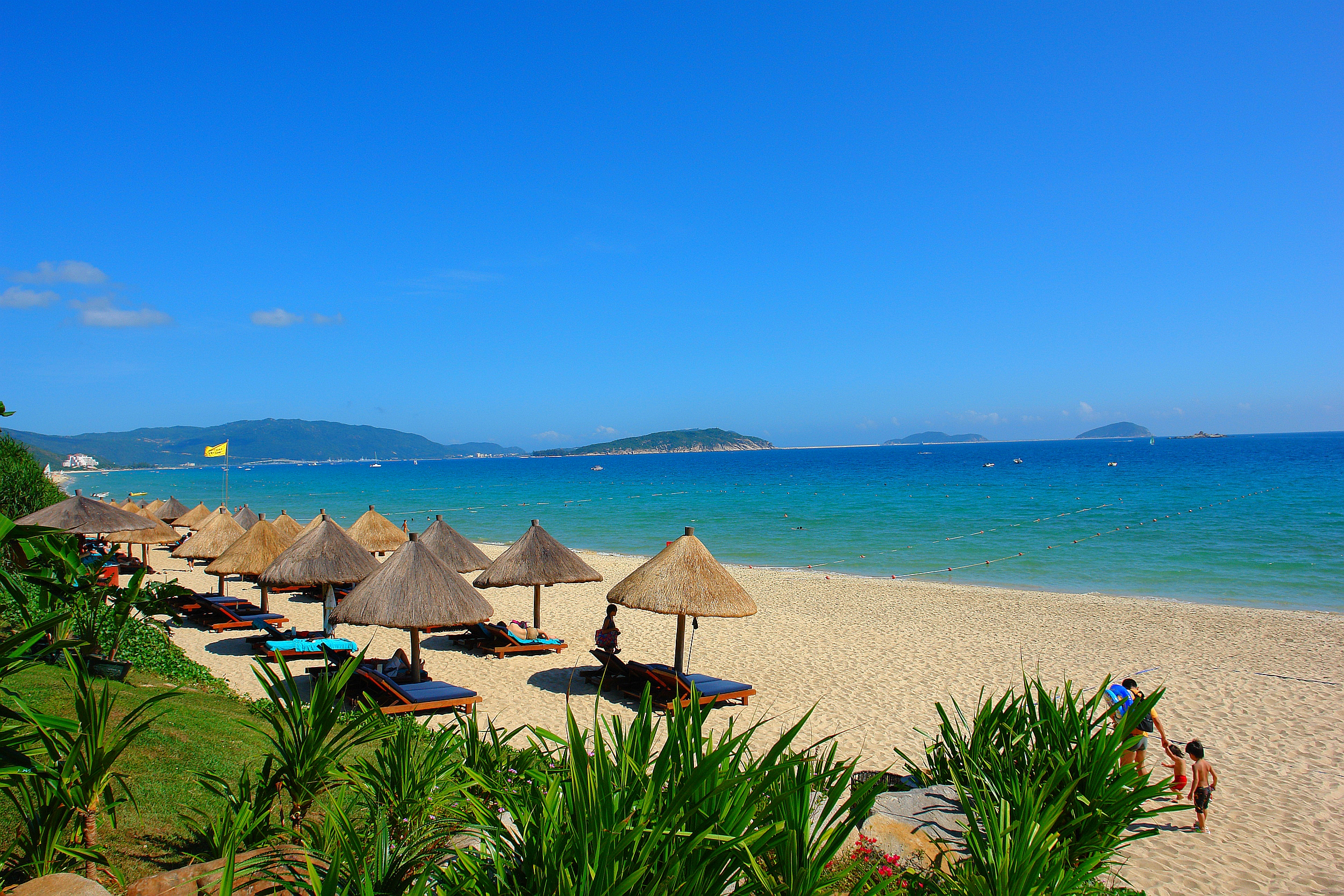
Yalong Bay is the most expensive and well-known beach in Hainan, and the location of numerous 5-star hotels.

Yalong Bay (Chinese: 亚龙湾) is a 7.5-kilometre (4.7 mi) beach located in southeast Sanya, Hainan, China. It is also known as the Yalong Bay National Resort. The eastern part of the bay is occupied by PLA Navy as the East Section of Yulin Naval Base.

== Hotels ==
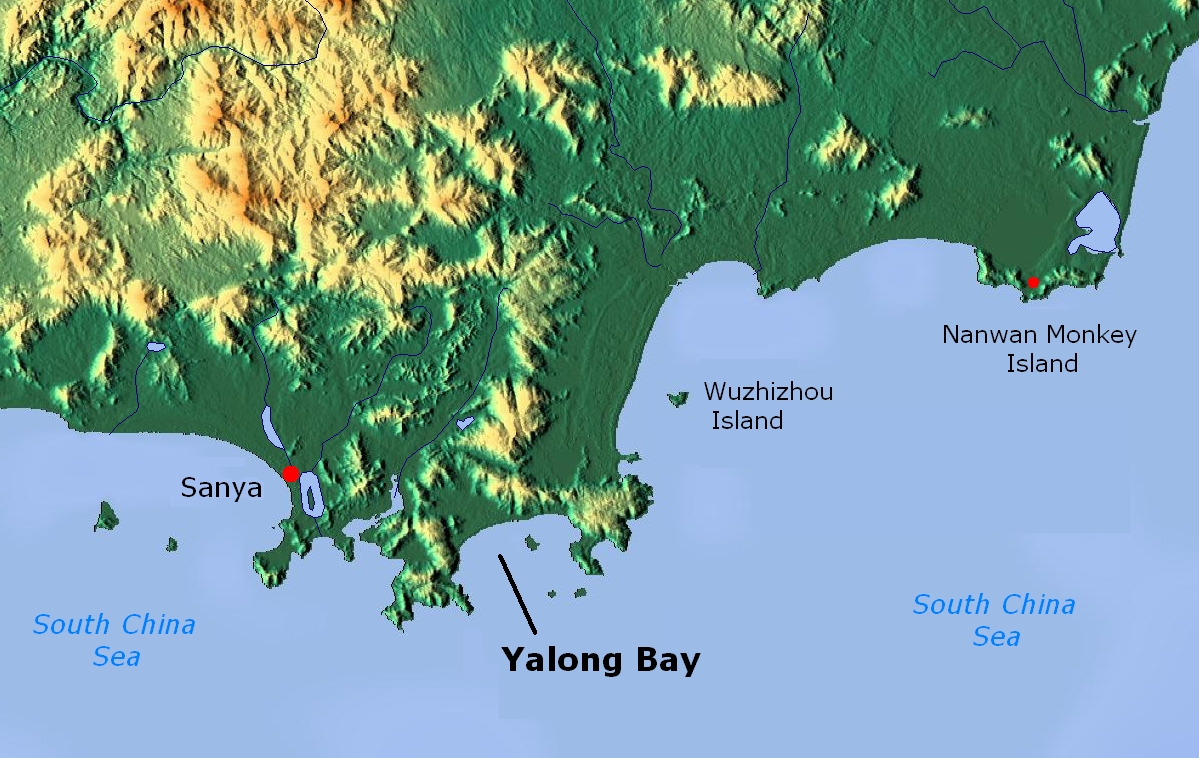
Yalong Bay, located east of Sanya

Many internationally operated hotels have opened in Yalong Bay, including the St Regis Yalong Bay Resort, Sheraton Sanya Resort, Marriott Hotel, Ritz-Carlton Sanya Resort, Pullman Yalong Bay, Grand Hyatt and MGM Grand Resorts. Several domestically-operated hotels including Resort Horizon, Mangrove Tree Resort, and Cactus Resort are also operating in the area.

== Transportation ==
=== High-speed rail ===
Yalongwan railway station is located here.

=== Bus ===
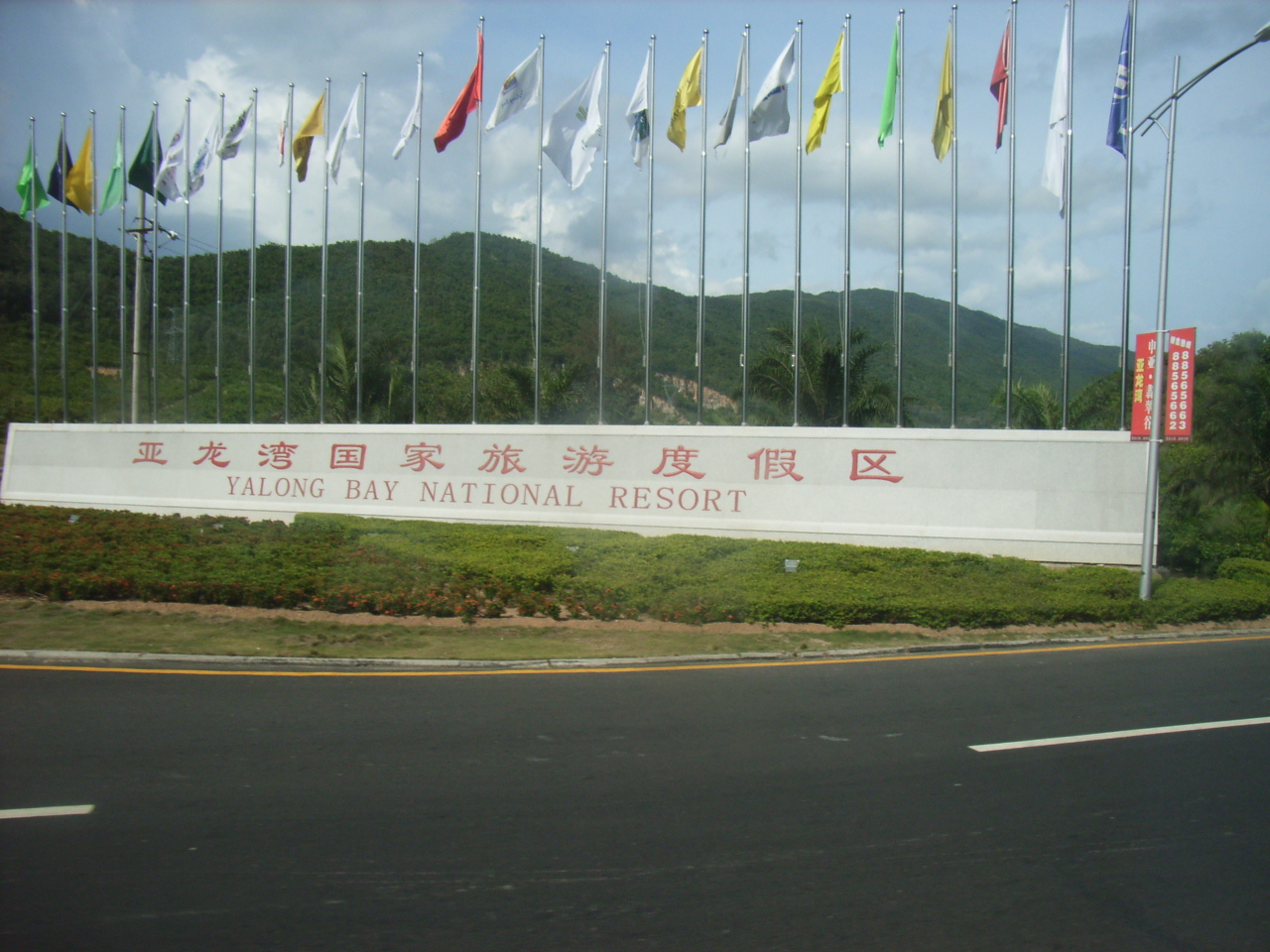
The sign of Yalong Bay National Resort

Passengers should pay the bus fare when boarding. Usually the exact fare should be put into the box by the driver. Fares vary according to distance travelled.

Two bus routes of particular use for visitors are the Number 8 and Number 27 which serve Sanya Phoenix International Airport and Yalong Bay.

In addition the Number 25 and 16 buses run regularly between Nanshan Temple and Yalong Bay, their routes passing through downtown Sanya and Dadonghai.
