= Production line =

Set of sequential operations established in a factory

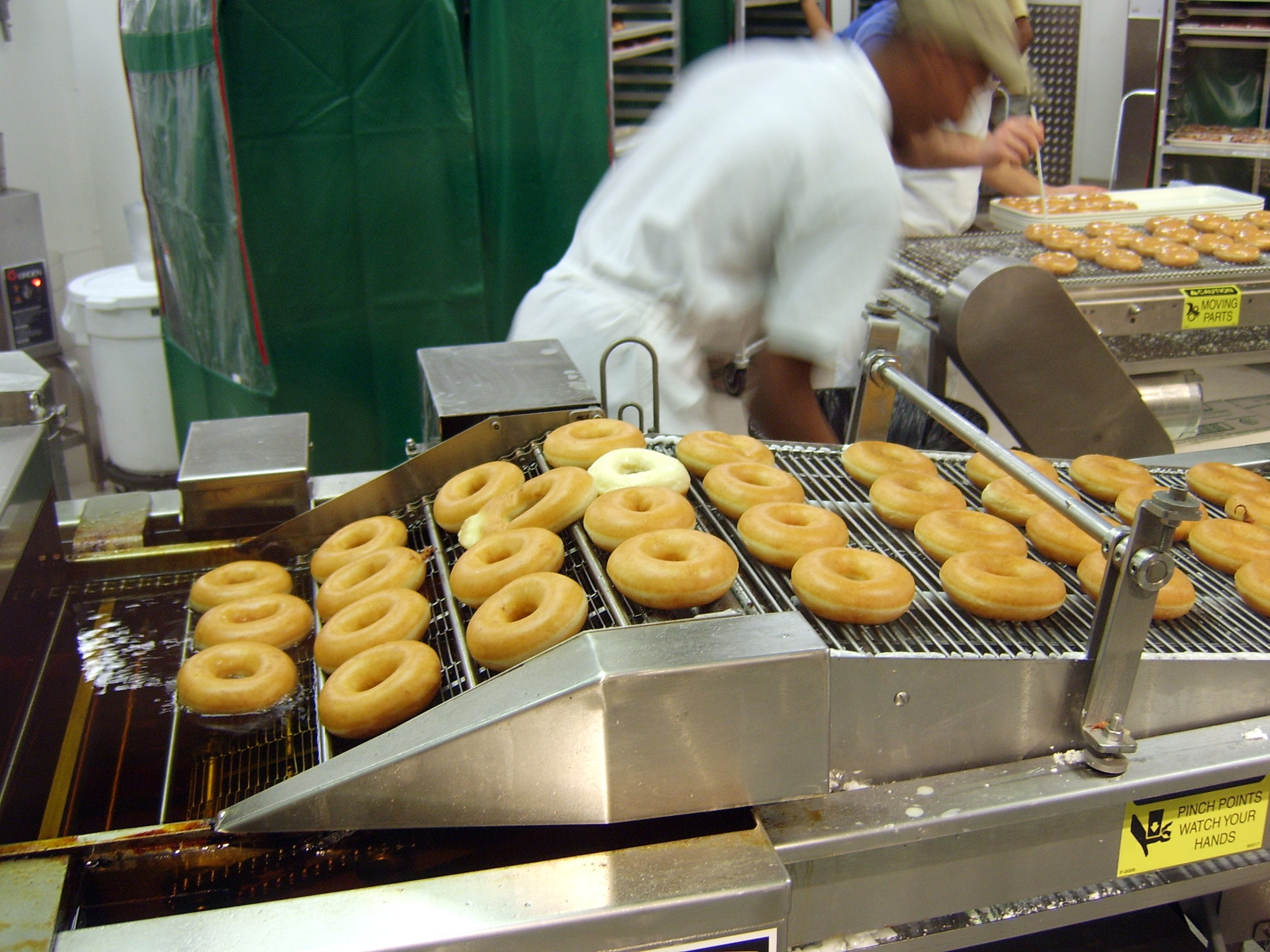
Doughnut production line

A production line is a set of sequential operations established in a factory where components are assembled to make a finished article or where materials are put through a refining process to produce an end-product that is suitable for onward consumption.

Typically, raw materials such as metal ores or agricultural products such as foodstuffs or textile source plants like cotton and flax require a sequence of treatments to render them useful. For metal, the processes include crushing, smelting and further refining. For plants, the useful material has to be separated from husks or contaminants and then treated for onward sale.

== History ==
Early production processes were constrained by the availability of a source of energy, with wind mills and water mills providing power for the crude heavy processes and manpower being used for activities requiring more precision. In earlier centuries, with raw materials, power and people often being in different locations, production was distributed across a number of sites. The concentration of numbers of people in manufactories, and later the factory as exemplified by the cotton mills of Richard Arkwright, started the move towards co-locating individual processes.

=== Introduction of the steam engine ===
With the development of the steam engine in the latter half of the 18th century, the production elements became less reliant on the location of the power source, and so the processing of goods moved to either the source of the materials or the location of people to perform the tasks. Separate processes for different treatment stages were brought into the same building, and the various stages of refining or manufacture were combined.

=== Industrial Revolution ===
With increasing use of steam power, and increasing use of machinery to supplant the use of people, the integrated use of techniques in production lines spurred the Industrial Revolutions of Europe and North America.

== Assembly line ==
Thus, from the processing of raw materials into useful goods, the next step was the concept of the assembly line, as introduced by Eli Whitney. This was taken to the next stage at the Ford Motor Company in 1913, where Henry Ford introduced the innovation of continuously moving the cars being assembled past individual workstations. This introduced the idea of standardization.

The assembly line was a contraption of many chains and links that moved to place different parts into various places throughout the car. The chassis of the car was moved along the 45-metre line by a chain conveyor and then 140 workers applied their assigned parts to the chassis. Other workers brought additional parts to the car builders to keep them stocked. The assembly line decreased the assembly time per vehicle. The production time for a single car dropped from over twelve hours to just 93 minutes.

== See also ==
- Conveyor
- József Galamb
- Mass production
- Pilot plant
