= Cabinet Committee on Security =

Committee of Cabinet of India

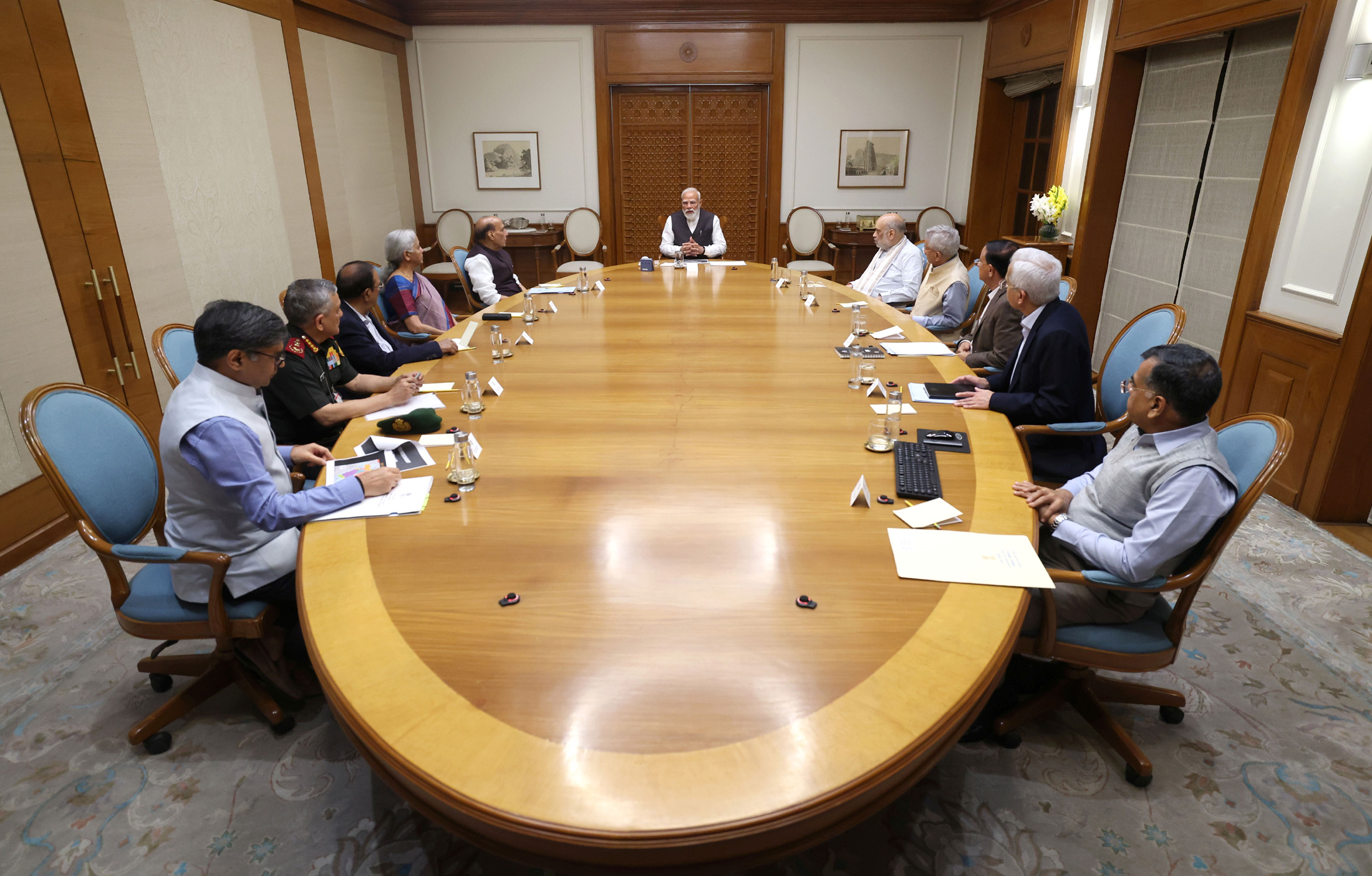
PM chairs the Cabinet Committee on Security (CCS) meeting, in New Delhi, on March 01, 2026 due to 2026 Iran War

The Cabinet Committee on Security (CCS) is a cabinet committee of the Government of India that discusses, debates and is the final decision-making body on senior appointments in the national security apparatus, defence policy and expenditure, and generally all matters of India's national security.

== Members of the Cabinet Committee ==
Cabinet Committee on Security (CCS)
Prime Minister of India
Narendra Modi
Minister of Defence	Minister of Home Affairs	National Security Advisor	Minister of External Affairs	Minister of Finance
Rajnath Singh	Amit Shah	Ajit Doval	Subrahmanyam Jaishankar	Nirmala Sitharaman

=== Attendees ===
The Cabinet Secretary, Secretary of the R&AW, Home Secretary, Director of the IB, Defence Secretary, Chief of Defence Staff, Foreign Secretary, Finance Secretary and the Principal Secretary have also been attendees of the CCS meetings.

== Other Cabinet Committees ==
Other Senior Cabinet Committees (as of 2020) include:

- Appointments Committee of the Cabinet - chaired by the Prime Minister of India
- Cabinet Committee on Accommodation - chaired by the Home Minister of India
- Cabinet Committee on Economic Affairs - chaired by the Prime Minister of India
- Cabinet Committee of Parliamentary Affairs - chaired by the Home Minister of India
- Cabinet Committee on Political Affairs - chaired by the Prime Minister of India
- Cabinet Committee on Growth and Investment - chaired by the Prime Minister of India
- Cabinet Committee on Employment and Skill Development- chaired by the Prime Minister of India

== See also ==
- Constitution of India
- Parliamentary democracy
- Union Council of Ministers of India
- National Security Council (India)
