= Yulin Naval Base =

People's Liberation Army Navy base in Hainan Province, China

Yulin naval base
- 榆林海军基地
- Sanya, Hainan

Site information
- Type: Naval Base
- Owner: People's Liberation Army Navy
- Open to the public: no

Location
- Coordinates: 18°13′31″N 109°31′45″E

Site history
- Battles/wars: Somali Naval Escort Operation of the People's Liberation Army

Garrison information
- Garrison: South Sea Fleet; Special Operations Brigade (PLA Navy Marine Corps)

Yulin Naval Base (Chinese: 楡林海军基地) is the traditional base of the People's Liberation Army Navy, located in the eastern suburb of Sanya, Hainan Province, China, next to Yulin Port. Further east on Yalong Bay is the new Longpo Naval Base, formerly called "Yulin-East", for the nuclear submarines and aircraft carriers.

The base area closest to Sanya is the base for a range of smaller vessels, including a unit of diesel-electric submarines.

== See also ==
- South Sea Fleet
