= INS Vagsheer (S26) =

Kalvari-class submarine of the Indian Navy

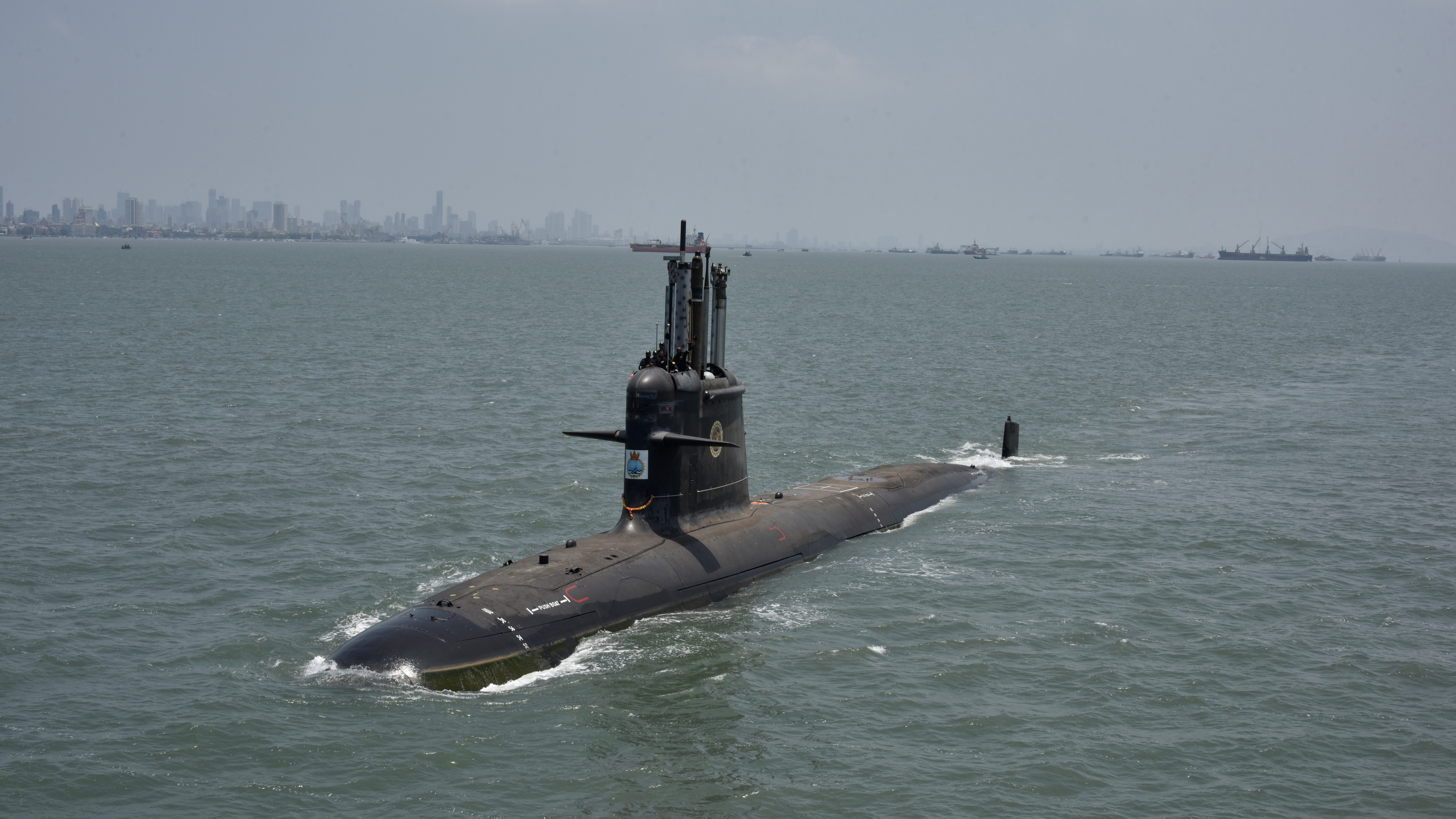

History

India
- Name: Vagsheer
- Namesake: Vagsheer (S43)
- Ordered: 2005
- Builder: Mazagon Dock Shipbuilders Limited, Mumbai
- Launched: 20 April 2022
- Acquired: 9 December 2024
- Commissioned: 15 January 2025
- Identification: Pennant number: S26
- Motto: वीरता वर्चसव विजित। "Courage, Dominance And Victory"
- Status: Active
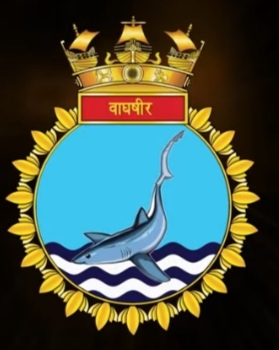
- Badge

General characteristics
- Class & type: Kalvari-class submarine
- Displacement: Surfaced: 1,615 tonnes (1,589 long tons); Submerged: 1,775 tonnes (1,747 long tons)
- Length: 67.5 m (221 ft 5 in)
- Beam: 6.2 m (20 ft 4 in)
- Height: 12.3 m (40 ft 4 in)
- Draught: 5.8 m (19 ft 0 in)
- Propulsion: 4 x MTU 12V 396 SE84 diesel engines; 360 x battery cells; DRDO PAFC Fuel Cell AIP (To be added in mid-life refit)
- Speed: Surfaced: 11 kn (20 km/h); Submerged: 20 kn (37 km/h)
- Range: 6,500 nmi (12,000 km) at 8 kn (15 km/h) (surfaced); 550 nmi (1,020 km) at 4 kn (7.4 km/h) (submerged)
- Endurance: 50 days
- Test depth: 350 metres (1,150 ft)
- Complement: 8 officers; 35 sailors
- Electronic warfare & decoys: C303/S anti-torpedo countermeasure system
- Armament: 6 × 533 mm (21 in) torpedo tubes for 18 SUT torpedoes OR; SM.39 Exocet anti-ship missiles; 30 mines in place of torpedoes

INS Vagsheer (S26) (lit. 'Sandfish') is the sixth submarine of the first batch of six Kalvari-class submarines for the Indian Navy. It is a diesel-electric attack submarine based on the Scorpène class, designed by French naval defence and energy group Naval Group and manufactured by Mazagon Dock Limited, an Indian shipyard in Mumbai, Maharashtra. The commissioning commanding officer of Vagsheer is Commander Vineet Sharma.

Capable of enemy radar evasion, area surveillance, intelligence gathering, advanced acoustic silencing techniques, low radiated noise levels, hydro-dynamically optimised shape. The submarine has the ability to launch a crippling attack on the enemy using precision guided weapons with both 18 torpedoes and tube-launched anti-ship missiles at the same time, underwater or surfaced. The submarine is armed with 18 torpedoes for anti-submarine warfare and anti-surface warfare. The stealth technology-enabled Kalvari-class submarine is 67.5 metres (221 ft 5 in) long with a beam of 6.2 metres (20 ft 4 in), and has a maximum speed of 11 knots (20 km/h) surfaced and 20 knots (37 km/h) submerged. The submarine has a maximum diving depth of 350 metres (1,150 ft) and can stay at sea for 50 days. The diesel-electric propulsion system utilises 360 battery cells.

== Etymology ==
The submarine has been named after the INS Vagsheer (S43), a Vela-class submarine of the Indian Navy which was in service from 1974 to 1997. Vagsheer refers to a type of sandfish found in the Indian Ocean.

== Construction and career ==
Vagsheer, the last of the six submarine, was launched on 20 April 2022. The ship started its sea trials on 19 May 2023. Initially, commissioning was scheduled for December 2024. The submarine was delivered on 9 January 2025

The submarine was commissioned on 15 January 2025 along with INS Surat and INS Nilgiri.

== Gallery ==
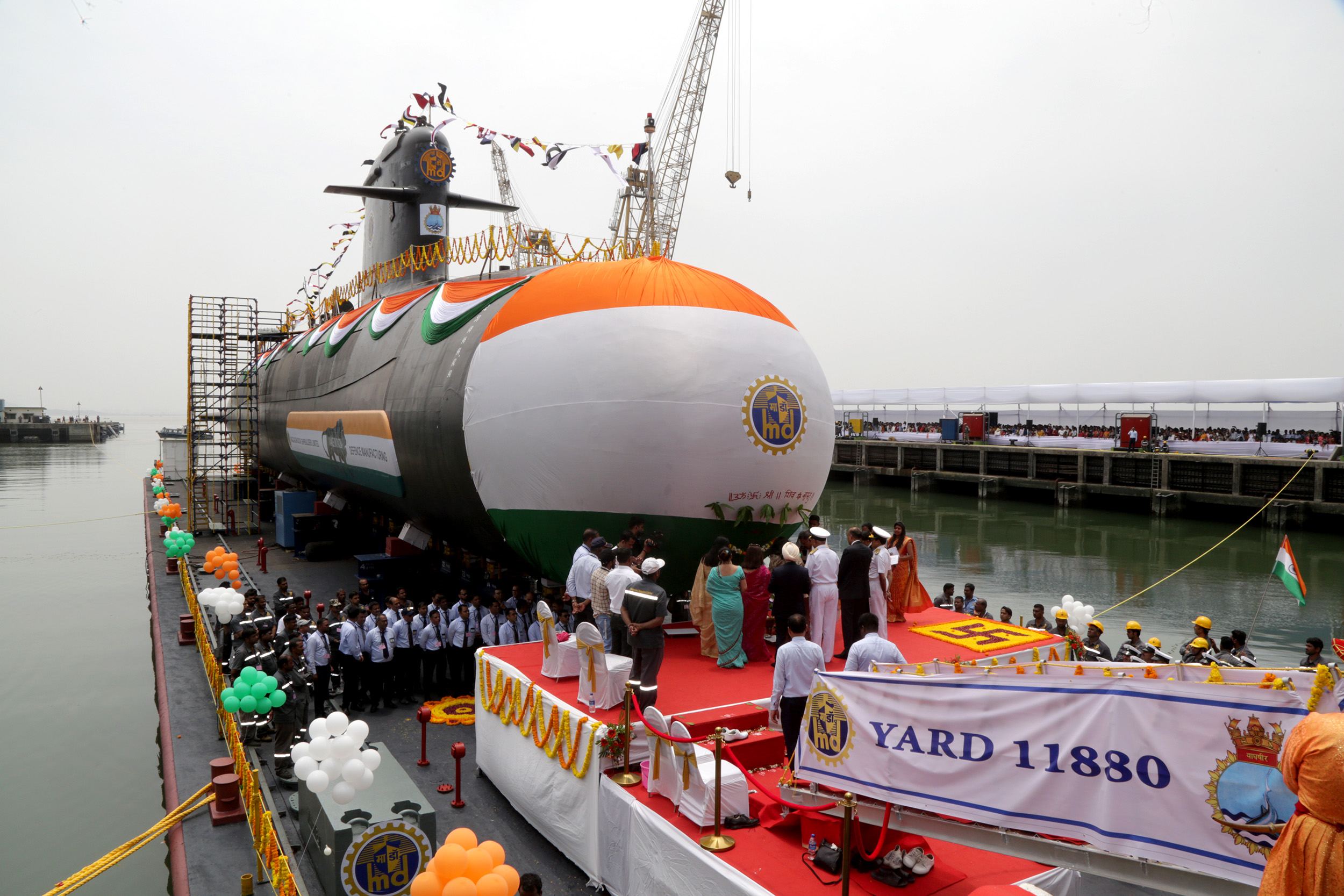

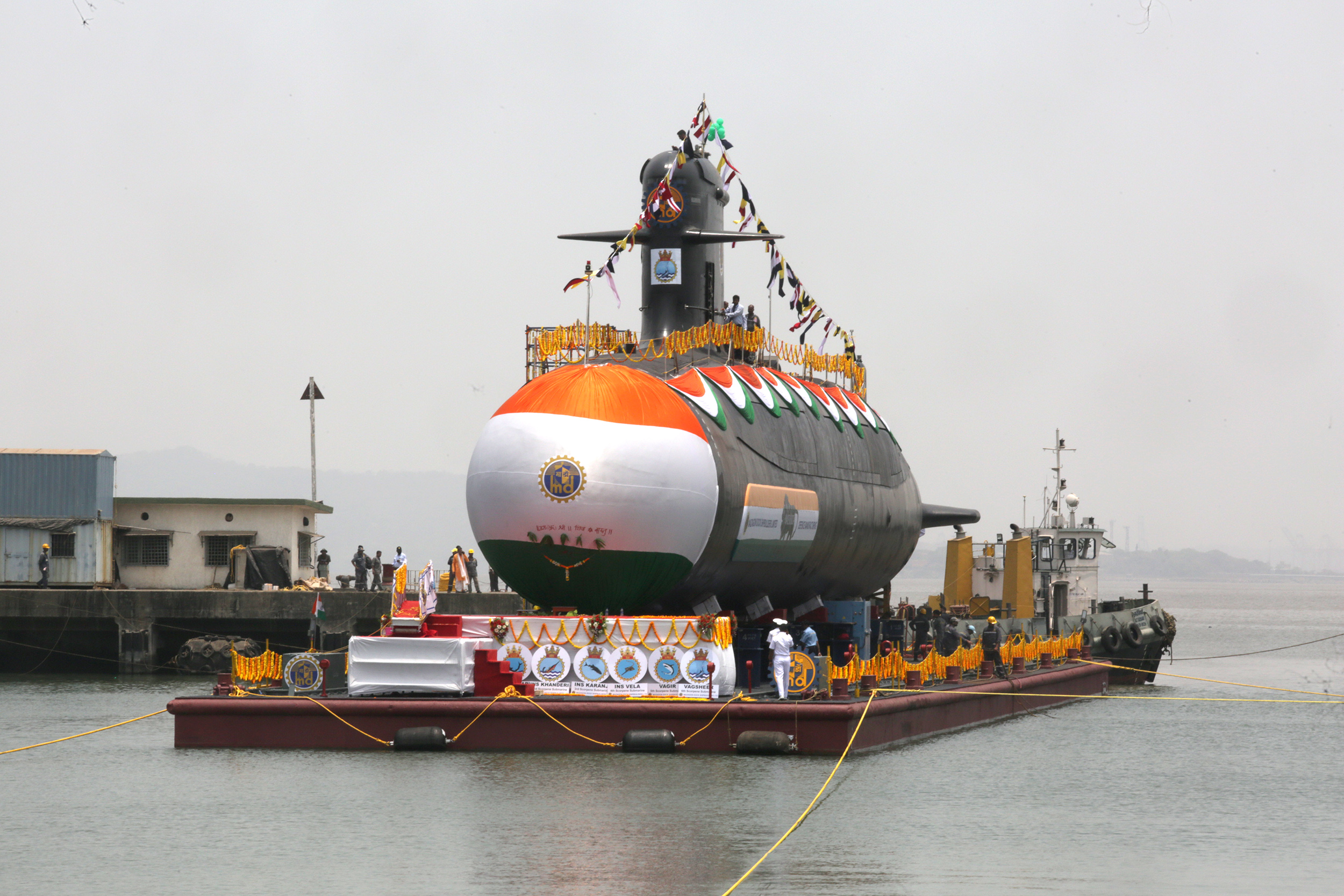

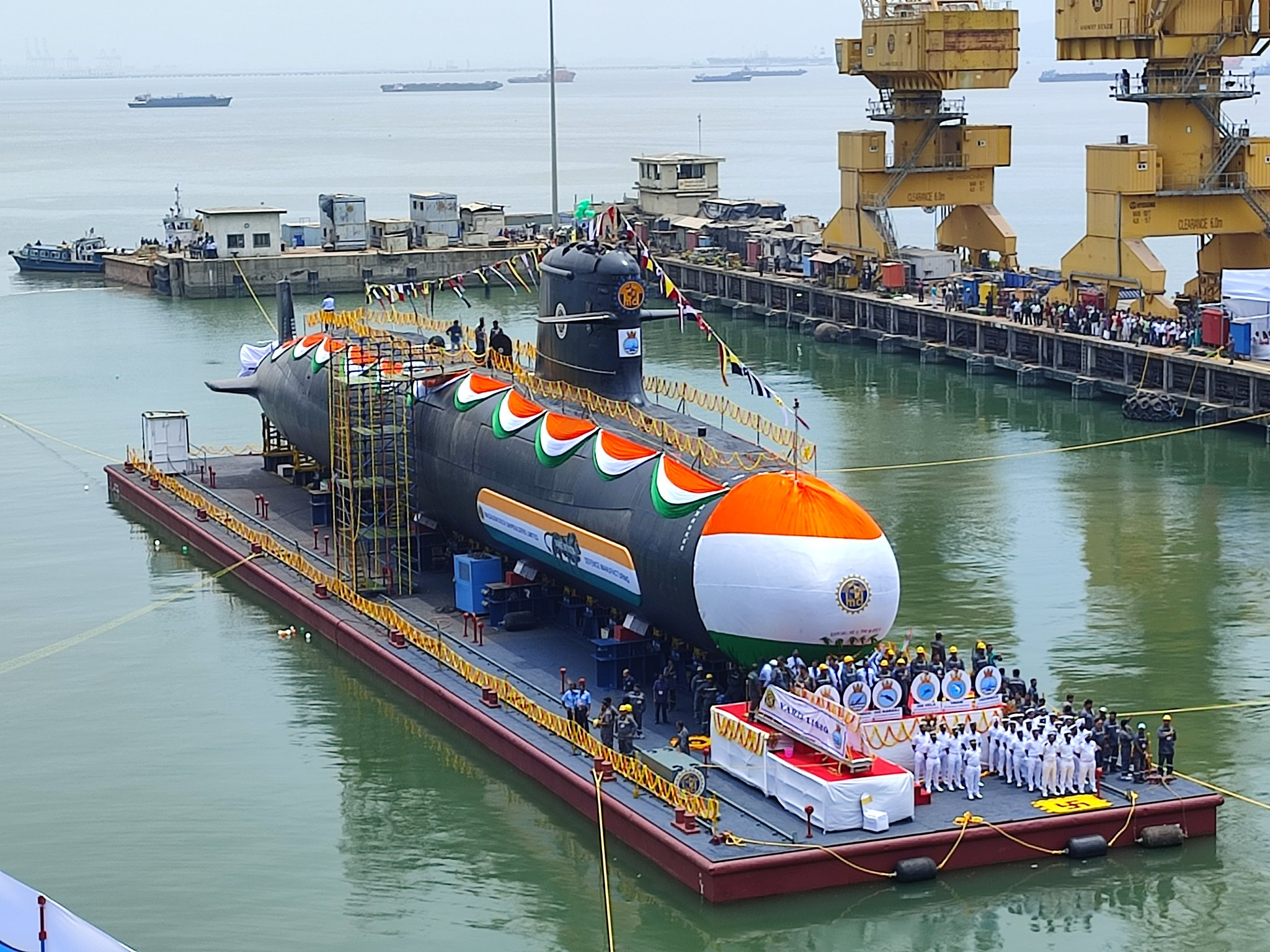
