= B. Sivakumar (admiral) =

Senior Flag officer in the Indian Navy

Vice Admiral B. Sivakumar AVSM, VSM
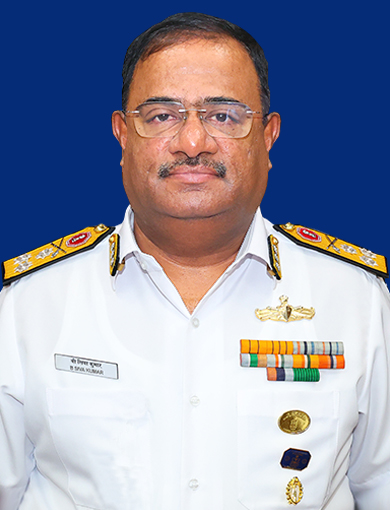
- Education: National Defence Academy; IIT Madras; College of Defence Management; National Defence College
- Spouse: Deepa Sivakumar
- Military career
- Allegiance: India
- Branch: Indian Navy
- Service years: 1987 - Present
- Rank: Vice Admiral
- Commands: Naval Dockyard (Mumbai); INS Valsura
- Awards: Ati Vishisht Seva Medal; Vishisht Seva Medal

Vice Admiral B. Sivakumar, AVSM, VSM is a serving Flag officer in the Indian Navy. He currently curves as the Chief of Materiel. He earlier served as the Controller of Warship Production and Acquisition and as the Admiral Superintendent Naval Dockyard (Mumbai).

== Early life and education ==
Sivakumar attended the National Defence Academy as part of the 70th course and was commissioned into the Indian Navy as an Electrical officer on 1 July 1987.

== Naval career ==
Sivakumar attended the Indian Institute of Technology, Madras obtaining a Master of Technology degree in Electrical Engineering. He served onboard multiple frontline warships - the Rajput-class destroyers INS Ranjit (D53), the Khukri-class corvette INS Kirpan (P44) and the Abhay-class corvette INS Akshay (P35) as Electrical officer.

Sivakumar served in both the naval dockyards in east and west - Naval Dockyard (Mumbai) and Naval Dockyard (Visakhapatnam). He attended the Higher Defence Management course at the College of Defence Management, Secunderabad. On 26 January 2015, he was awarded the Vishisht Seva Medal.

As a Commodore, he commanded the premier Electrical Training Base, INS Valsura. In 2017, he was selected to attend the National Defence College as part of the 57th course. He headed both electrical directorates at naval headquarters - weapons equipment and electrical engineering.

=== Flag rank ===
On promotion to flag rank, Sivakumar was appointed Additional Director General (Tech) of Project Seabird. He then moved to Mumbai as the Chief Staff Officer (Technical) to the Flag Officer Commanding-in-Chief Western Naval Command. On 24 February 2021, he was appointed the Admiral Superintendent of Naval Dockyard (Mumbai) (ASD Mumbai). After a year-long tenure, he moved to NHQ as the Assistant Chief of Materiel (Information Technology & Systems). For his tenure as ASD Mumbai, he was awarded the Ati Vishisht Seva Medal on 26 January 2022.

In 2023, he was promoted to the rank of Vice Admiral and appointed Programme Director of the Advanced Technology Vessel Project. After a short tenure, he took over as the Controller of Warship Production and Acquisition (CWP&A) from Vice Admiral Kiran Deshmukh on 1 January 2024. A year later, on 30 January 2025, he relinquished charge of CWP&A to Vice Admiral Rajaram Swaminathan and took over as the Director General Naval Projects (Visakhapatnam) the next day from Vice Admiral Srinivasan Gopinathan.

On 1 November 2025, he was appointed Chief of Materiel, a principal staff officer (PSO) at NHQ. He took over from Vice Admiral Kiran Deshmukh. He is the Senior most Technical Officer in the Indian Navy.

== Awards and decorations ==
Sivakumar was awarded the Vishisht Seva Medal in 2015 and the Ati Vishisht Seva Medal in 2022.

Ati Vishisht Seva Medal	Vishisht Seva Medal	Operation Vijay Medal	Operation Vijay Star
Operation Parakram Medal	75th Anniversary of Independence Medal	50th Anniversary of Independence Medal	30 Years Long Service Medal
	20 Years Long Service Medal	9 Years Long Service Medal	

Military offices
Preceded by Rajaram Swaminathan	Admiral Superintendent Naval Dockyard (Mumbai); 2021 - 2022	Succeeded by K. P. Arvindan
Preceded by Kiran Deshmukh	Controller of Warship Production and Acquisition; 2024 - 2025	Succeeded by Rajaram Swaminathan
Preceded by Kiran Deshmukh	Chief of Materiel; 2025 - Present	Incumbent
