= Sandeep Naithani =

Indian Navy admiral

Vice Admiral Sandeep Naithani PVSM, AVSM, VSM
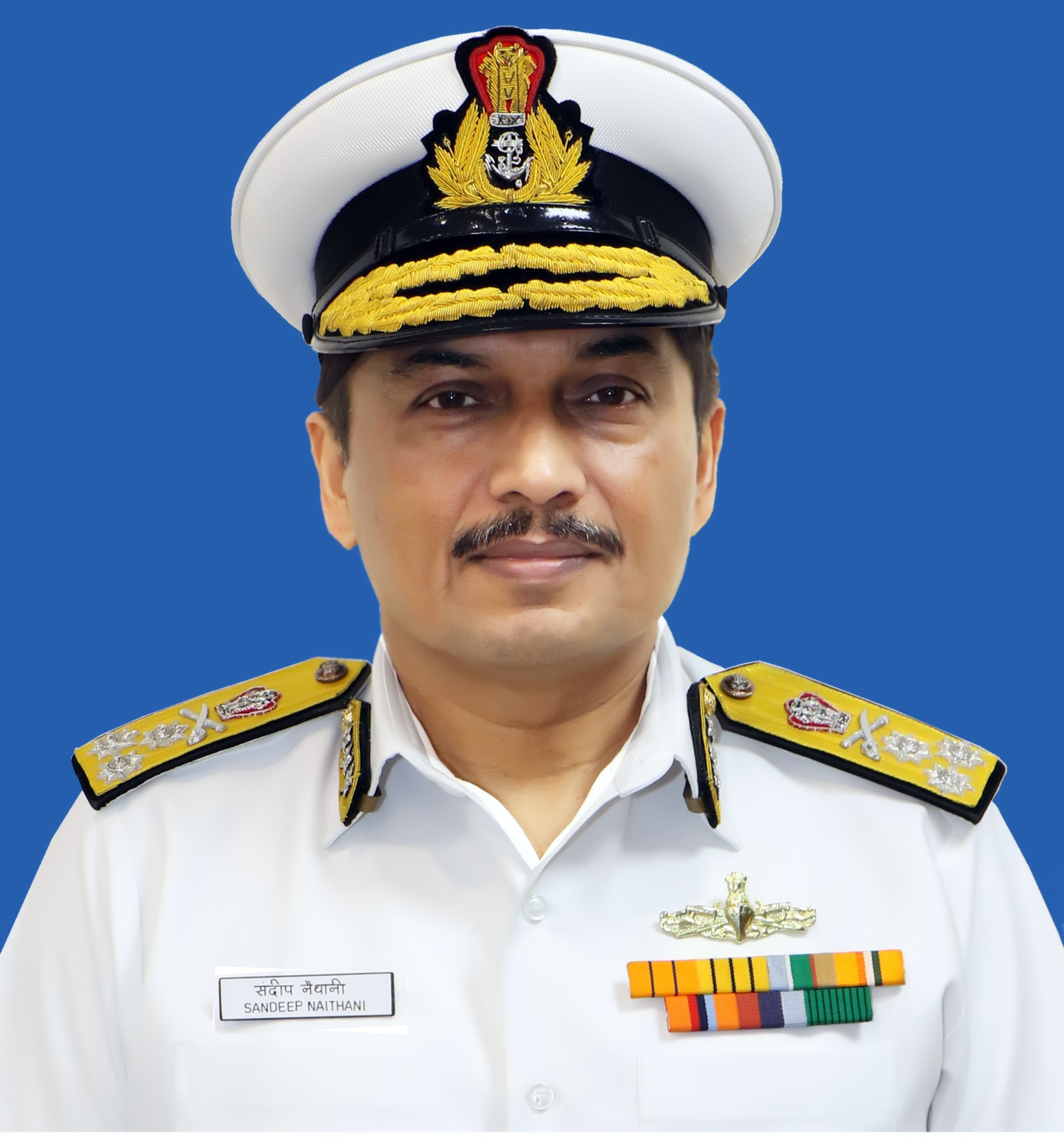
- Military career
- Allegiance: India
- Branch: Indian Navy
- Service years: 1 Jan 1985 - 31 December 2023
- Rank: Vice Admiral
- Commands: Naval Dockyard (Mumbai); INS Valsura
- Awards: Param Vishisht Seva Medal; Ati Vishisht Seva Medal; Vishisht Seva Medal

Vice Admiral Sandeep Naithani, PVSM, AVSM, VSM is a former Flag officer in the Indian Navy. He last served as the chief of materiel. He has earlier served as the Controller of Warship Production and Acquisition from 2020 to 2021 and as the admiral superintendent Naval Dockyard (Mumbai) in 2018.

== Early life and education ==
Naithani hails from Pauri district of Uttarakhand. His father, Sanat Kumar Naithani, was an engineer in the Military Engineer Services. He attended the Government Model High School, Chandigarh and the Visakha Valley School in Visakhapatnam. He graduated from the National Defence Academy, Pune as part of the 65th course.

== Naval career ==
Naithani was commissioned into the electrical branch of the Indian Navy on 1 January 1985. He served three tenures on board the aircraft carrier INS Viraat (R22). Ashore, he has served in the Naval Dockyards at Mumbai and Visakhapatnam. At Naval Dockyard (Mumbai), he served as the manager, electrical and power systems. Subsequently, he served as the assistant general manager (Planning) at Naval Dockyard (Visakhapatnam).

Naithani has completed the staff course at the Defence Services Staff College, Wellington. He also holds a master's degree in radar and communication engineering from the Indian Institute of Technology, Delhi. He also attended the National Defence College, New Delhi.

=== Flag rank ===
On promotion to flag rank, Naithani was appointed Assistant Chief of Materiel (Modernisation) at Naval headquarters (NHQ). He then moved to the Western Naval Command as the chief staff officer (technical) to the Flag Officer Commanding-in-Chief Western Naval Command. In January 2018, he was appointed admiral superintendent of Naval Dockyard (Mumbai). Later that year, he was promoted to the rank of vice admiral and took over as the Director General Naval Projects (DGNP), Mumbai.

For his tenure as admiral superintendent of naval dockyard mumbai, Naithani was awarded the Ati Vishisht Seva Medal on 26 January 2019. He subsequently was appointed programme director of the Advanced Technology Vessel project. On 12 June 2019, Naithani took over as the Controller of Warship Production and Acquisition (CWP&A) at NHQ, from Vice Admiral S. R. Sarma.

On 1 June 2021, he was appointed Chief of Materiel, a principal staff officer (PSO) at NHQ. He also is the senior most technical officer in the Indian Navy. After a two-and-a-half year tenure, he superannuated on 31 December 2023, after handing over to Vice Admiral Kiran Deshmukh.

== Awards and decorations ==

Param Vishisht Seva Medal	Ati Vishisht Seva Medal	Vishisht Seva Medal	Operation Parakram Medal
75th Anniversary of Independence Medal	50th Anniversary of Independence Medal		30 Years Long Service Medal
20 Years Long Service Medal		9 Years Long Service Medal	

== Personal life ==
He is married to Manju Naithani and the couple has two daughters - Pyuli and Palek.

Military offices
Preceded by S. R. Sarma	Controller of Warship Production and Acquisition; June 2019 – May 2021	Succeeded by Kiran Deshmukh
Preceded by S. R. Sarma	Chief of Materiel; June 2021 – December 2023	Succeeded by Kiran Deshmukh
