= J. T. G. Pereira =

Indian Navy admiral and naval engineer (1923–2020)

Vice-Admiral J. T. G. Pereira PVSM, AVSM
- Born: February 1923; Cannanore, Malabar district, Madras Presidency, British India (now Kannur, Kerala, India)
- Died: 16 November 2020 (aged 97); Mumbai, Maharashtra, India
- Military career
- Allegiance: British India; India
- Branch: Royal Indian Navy; Indian Navy
- Service years: 1944 - 1979
- Rank: Vice Admiral
- Commands: Naval Dockyard (Bombay)
- Conflicts: Second World War; Indo-Pakistani War of 1971
- Awards: Param Vishisht Seva Medal; Ati Vishisht Seva Medal

Vice-Admiral John Thomas Goslin Pereira PVSM, AVSM (February 1923 – 16 November 2020) was a former flag officer of the Indian Navy. A naval engineer, he was awarded the Param Vishist Seva Medal during the Indo-Pakistani War of 1971.

== Early life and education ==
Pereira was born in February 1923, one of five children born to Cecil Pereira. His first cousin, Ronnie was born the same year.

In 1939, Pereira joined the training ship IMMTS Dufferin. After two years, he was selected to enter the Navy. He underwent cadet training at the Britannia Royal Naval College and qualified as a marine engineer at the Royal Naval Engineering College.

== Naval career ==
=== Early career ===
Pereira was commissioned an engineer acting sub-lieutenant in the Royal Indian Navy on 1 May 1944, and promoted to engineer sub-lieutenant on 1 September (seniority from 1 August 1943). During the Second World War, he served aboard the battleships HMS Ramillies and HMS Howe, and on the light cruiser HMS Nigeria, ending the war as an acting lieutenant. In October 1946, he was promoted to substantive engineer lieutenant (seniority from 1 October 1944).

=== Post-Independence ===
In September 1948, Pereira returned to India as the Senior Watch Keeper on HMIS Delhi. He was later selected for the Advanced Marine Engineering Course at the Royal Naval College, Greenwich. He served as engineer officer on INS Delhi, INS Mysore and INS Rana. In 1954, as an acting commander, Pereira was appointed assistant manager of IN Dockyard Bombay, and was promoted to substantive engineer commander on 31 December 1955. On 6 May 1960, he was promoted to acting captain on special duty "in connection with the acquisition of Mazagaon Docks," and on 17 June was further appointed Fleet Engineering Officer (Ashore) on the staff of the Flag Officer Commanding Indian Fleet.

From 1963, Pereira had an instrumental role in the expansion and modernisation of the Naval Dockyard Bombay, including building a new cruiser graving dock and keeping up with new technologies for repairing engines and weapons systems. He rose to become Director of Naval Engineering and subsequently Industrial Manager of the Naval Dockyard. During the 1971 Indo-Pakistan War, Commodore Pereira was the chief staff officer (Technical) of the Western Naval Command, and was involved in planning key naval operations, including a major missile attack on Karachi. Already awarded the Ati Vishisht Seva Medal (AVSM) in 1971, he was awarded the Param Vishisht Seva Medal (PVSM) for his contributions to victory by maintaining the ships of the Western Naval Command in a high state of efficiency.

=== Flag officer ===
Pereira was promoted to rear admiral on 8 August 1972 and appointed Admiral Superintendent of the Naval Dockyard (Bombay). On 1 July 1976, he was promoted to the rank of Vice Admiral and appointed Chief of Material, the senior-most technical appointment of the Navy. After a three-year stint as COM, he retired on 30 June 1979.

== Personal life ==
A noted socialite and racehorse owner, Pereira settled down at his beachfront property in Karanja with his family. He founded a beach resort, called Hotel Uran Plaza in this property. On 16 November 2020, he died after a brief illness at the naval hospital INHS Asvini aged 97 and was survived by his son Michael and daughter Jennifer.

== Bibliography ==
- Thomas, Commander Anup (2019), Pride & Honour- Biography of Admiral R.L. Pereira, PVSM, AVSM, Southern Naval Command, Indian Navy, ISBN 978-8193600115

Military offices
Preceded by Rajendra Tandon	Chief of Material; 1976-1979	Succeeded by A. K. Bhatia
