= INS Vishal =

Planned aircraft carrier of the Indian Navy

History

India
- Name: INS Vishal
- Status: Planned (Design phase)

General characteristics
- Class & type: Vishal-class aircraft carrier
- Displacement: 65,000 t (64,000 long tons)
- Length: 300 m (984 ft 3 in)
- Speed: 35 kn (65 km/h; 40 mph)
- Aircraft carried: 72 (58 fixed-wing and 14 rotary-wing)

INS Vishal, also known as Indigenous Aircraft Carrier 3 (IAC-III) until 2022, is a planned aircraft carrier for the Indian Navy. It is intended to be the third aircraft carrier to be built in India after INS Vikrant (IAC-1) and another Vikrant-class aircraft carrier, provisionally called IAC-II.

As of April 2026, Indian Defence News described the project as remaining "elusive" amid continued government silence over plans for the Vishal.

== Development timeline ==
=== 2011–14 ===
The existing plans for a second indigenous aircraft carrier (IAC) following INS Vikrant were first revealed in April 2011 by the then Chief of the Naval Staff, Admiral Nirmal Kumar Verma. However, such a project would not be taken up soon as there were other budgetary priorities for the Navy.

The IAC-II, christened INS Vishal, was first reported to have entered the design phase by August 2012. The aircraft carrier was expected to have a displacement of 65,000 tonnes and feature a CATOBAR system. The aircraft carrier was supposed to enter service in 2025.

=== 2015–16 ===
In February 2015, reports stated that the Indian Navy was accelerating the design and development of its second indigenous aircraft carrier (IAC-II), christened INS Vishal, as INS Viraat (R22) was scheduled to be decommissioned within a year. The detailed study on the programme, which was underway, would decide the propulsion system of the ship. Nuclear propulsion was being considered as well. Additionally, the Navy had already decided to equip the carrier with a CATOBAR system, with the service having inquired for the EMALS developed by General Atomics, featuring on the US Navy's Gerald R. Ford-class aircraft carriers. The construction of the aircraft carrier will take 10–12 years and it could be commissioned as early as 2033. Thirty Indian Navy admirals and captains were also briefed on the EMALS technology by General Atomics in as early as 2013. The briefing was conducted by Scott Forney III, the senior official of the firm.

In May 2015, the then Navy chief, Robin K. Dhowan, considered nuclear propulsion as one of the options to power India's second aircraft carrier as the service sought approval to acquire six nuclear-attack submarines. On 13 May 2015, Defence Acquisition Council (DAC) allotted ₹30 crore (equivalent to ₹49 crore or US$5.3 million in 2026) for the initial construction planning process of INS Vishal.

On 17 July 2015, the Navy issued a Letter of Request to four foreign firms — Lockheed Martin, BAE Systems, DCNS, and Rosoboronexport seeking assistance in designing IAC-II. The design specifications was informed in the letter. The Navy expects the vessel to have a displacement of 65,000 tonnes with a length of around 300 metres. It must have a speed in excess of 30 knots, though the propulsion type, whether nuclear or conventional (diesel or gas turbine), was not mentioned. While the letter confirmed the requirement of a CATOBAR system, EMALS was kept as optional. The responses were to be submitted within a deadline of 22 July and the proposal shall include the costing elements. A budget of $5 million had been assigned for the early design phase.

Rear Admiral Surinder Ahuja, Assistant Controller of Carrier Project and head of the MoD-appointed study group, has been tasked with selecting the shipyard that will undertake the project. Indian public shipyards including Hindustan Shipyard Limited (HSL), Garden Reach Shipbuilders & Engineers (GRSE), Cochin Shipyard Limited and Goa Shipyard Limited (GSL) as well as private shipyards Larsen & Toubro (L&T), Pipavav Shipyard, ABG Shipyard and Bharti Shipyard were invited to submit their Expression of Interest to build the aircraft carrier. HSL was already willing to take up the project. The shipyards have been given a deadline of 21 July to submit their responses.

The United States-India Joint Working Group on Aircraft Carrier Technology Cooperation was formed during the then US President Barack Obama's state visit to India in January 2015. The working group is meant to enhance bilateral cooperation in the field of aircraft carriers. The countries have already discussed about EMALS under the framework of the Defence Trade and Technology Initiative (DTTI). The working group met for the inaugural meeting on 12–14 August 2015. The Indian delegation was led by the then Flag Officer Commanding-in-Chief Western Naval Command, Vice Admiral Surinder Pal Singh Cheema. The delegation also visited PCU Gerald R. Ford which was then under construction at Newport News Shipbuilding, Virginia as well as U.S. Navy test site for carrier launch and recovery systems. The meet was co-chaired by United States Navy’s Program Executive Officer for Aircraft Carriers, Rear Admiral Thomas Moore, and India’s Controller of Warship Production and Acquisition, Vice Admiral G. S. Pabby.

=== 2016–20 ===
As of February 2016, the construction of the carrier was expected to begin in 2020–21.

In November 2016, a Business Standard report suggested that the Indian Navy had opted nuclear-propulsion for the aircraft carrier. The advanced technologies that were planned to be introduced into the carrier, including CATOBAR configuration, meant that Vishal's projected commissioning year could be pushed to 2030s. The choice was conveyed to the government where the final decision would be taken. As of December 2016, the then Assistant Controller Carrier Projects (ACCP), Rear Admiral Surendra Ahuja, announced that the proposal for the IAC-II project had been forwarded to the government.

By October 2017, Business Standard again reported that the nuclear propulsion for the aircraft carrier had been dropped and was to be conventionally powered. The proposal of the project was reportedly placed before the Services Capital Acquisition Categorisation Higher Committee, headed by the Chief of Integrated Defence Staff. The project could be approved by the Defence Acquisition Council by the year-end. The Bhabha Atomic Research Centre (BARC) had informed the Navy that it would take them 15–20 years to develop such a high-rated nuclear reactor, ideally with an output of 500 to 550 megawatts, for operations in the saline, maritime environment. The Navy had then chosen an Integrated Full Electric Propulsion System (IFEP). However, the Navy planners had concluded that EMALS could be supported with IFEP system. The cost of the aircraft carrier would be over $20 billion. The project could also be kept on hold until 2022 for these budgetary requirements which would eventually push the commissioning to 2040.

In December 2018, the then Chief of the Naval Staff, Admiral Sunil Lanba, confirmed that the Indian Navy had chosen EMALS technology for the future aircraft carrier and acquisition for the system was being progressed with the Indian Ministry of Defence. India and the US were also reportedly finalising the terms for a government-to-government agreement. Additionally, the service had ruled out nuclear propulsion and had chosen for conventional, electric propulsion. The design of the ship was still on the drawing board and specifications were yet to be frozen. The construction of the vessel could commence in three years. A three aircraft carrier-fleet had been proposed with the idea of two of them deployed at sea with the third remaining under maintenance.

In April 2019, an Australian Defence Magazine reported that United Kingdom-based BAE Systems had offered a design based on its Queen Elizabeth-class aircraft carrier for the IAC-II project. The company was in touch with the Indian Navy for the development of a Military Off the Shelf (MOTS) derivative of the Queen Elizabeth Class design to meet the service requirements. The design was reportedly compatible with either ski-jump or catapult launch. Indian Navy officials had visited the firm's shipyard at Rosyth, near Edinburgh, where the second aircraft carrier of the class was under construction. Later, British newspaper Daily Mirror reported on 5 May that the Navy could buy the carrier design. Naval Group (formerly, DCNS) had offered a conventionally-powered (non-nuclear) variant of the Charles de Gaulle design.

=== 2021–25 ===
In April 2021, the Indian Navy, wanting to give preference to nuclear powered and conventional submarines in future sea-warfare, has decided that it will now begin planning the third aircraft carrier, INS Vishal, as a replacement for the serving INS Vikramaditya.

In December 2022, the then Navy Chief, Admiral R. Hari Kumar, announced the Indian Navy could considering to place a repeat order for a Vikrant-class aircraft carrier before proceeding with Vishal. This was both due to budget constraints, satisfactory performance of newly commissioned INS Vikrant, expertise acquired by Cochin Shipyard from the IAC-I and a quicker build time. A study to determine the desired specifications and capabilities for the second indigenous aircraft carrier was still underway. However, the Navy would continue to study about its requirement of a supercarrier.

On 5 September 2025, the Ministry of Defence published the Technology Perspective and Capability Roadmap 2025 (TPCR-25). As per the document, which reveals a 15-year roadmap for the Armed Forces, Indian Navy envisions to operate at least 10 nuclear-propelled surface ships including an aircraft carrier with such propulsion.

== Design ==
=== Propulsion ===
During the initial studies, the Indian Navy kept both convensional propulsion, which includes both diesel engine and gas turbine, as well as nuclear propulsion options to power India's second aircraft carrier. As per reports on November 2016, Navy had opted nuclear propulsion for the aircraft carrier. However, by October 2017, the force had to switch to an Integrated Full Electric Propulsion System (IFEP) since Bhabha Atomic Research Centre (BARC) had informed the Navy that it would take them 15–20 years to develop such a high-rated nuclear reactor, ideally with an output of 500 to 550 megawatts, for operations in the saline, maritime environment.

The Indian Navy confirmed its plans to operate a nuclear-propelled aircraft carrier under the 15-year roadmap of the defence ministry, TPCR-25, released in September 2025.

=== Flight deck configuration ===
The Indian Navy has opted to equip the aircraft carrier with a CATOBAR configuration featuring electromagnetic catapult technology.

In May 2013, the Navy had expressed its interest in the Electromagnetic Aircraft Launch System (EMALS) developed by the General Atomics for the US Navy's Gerald R. Ford-class aircraft carriers. In fact, thirty admirals and captains of the Indian Navy were also briefed on the EMALS technology by General Atomics. The briefing was conducted by Scott Forney III, the senior official of the firm, along with permission of the US Government. Equipping the carriers with the technology would also allow the operations of a wider range of aircraft including heavier fighter aircraft, AEW aircraft and UCAVs.

In April 2015, US Under Secretary of Defense for Acquisition and Sustainment, Frank Kendall, stated that the Obama administration was supportive of selling EMALS to India, amongst other technologies. In October 2017, ahead of US Secretary of State Rex Tillerson's visit to India, the Trump administration had reportedly approved the release of technology for the EMALS for Vishal.

As per August 2024 media report, Research & Development Establishment (Engineers) has developed a scaled-down technology demonstrator, known as Electro-Magnetic Launch System (EMLS) capable of launching payloads up to 400 kilograms (880 lb) (equivalent to an unmanned aerial vehicle) over a short span of 16 to 18 metres (52 to 59 ft). The demonstrator is being further developed into a full-scale EMLS for application on future aircraft carriers. Industry partners were reportedly being sought to develop the full-scale system to launch platforms weighing up to 40 tons can be handled by the system. Two crucial technologies including Pulse Power (which controls the electromagnetic catapult's power requirements and ensures precise and dependable launches) and Linear Electric Machine (which produces the electromagnetic force required to launch aircraft) were successfully developed.

As per TPCR-25, the Navy is expected to procure two units of EMALS units along with three to four units of arresting gears and restraining gears each for its future aircraft carrier.

=== Carrier air wing ===
INS Vishal is expected to operate a carrier air wing of 30–35 fixed-wing aircraft and 20 helicopters.

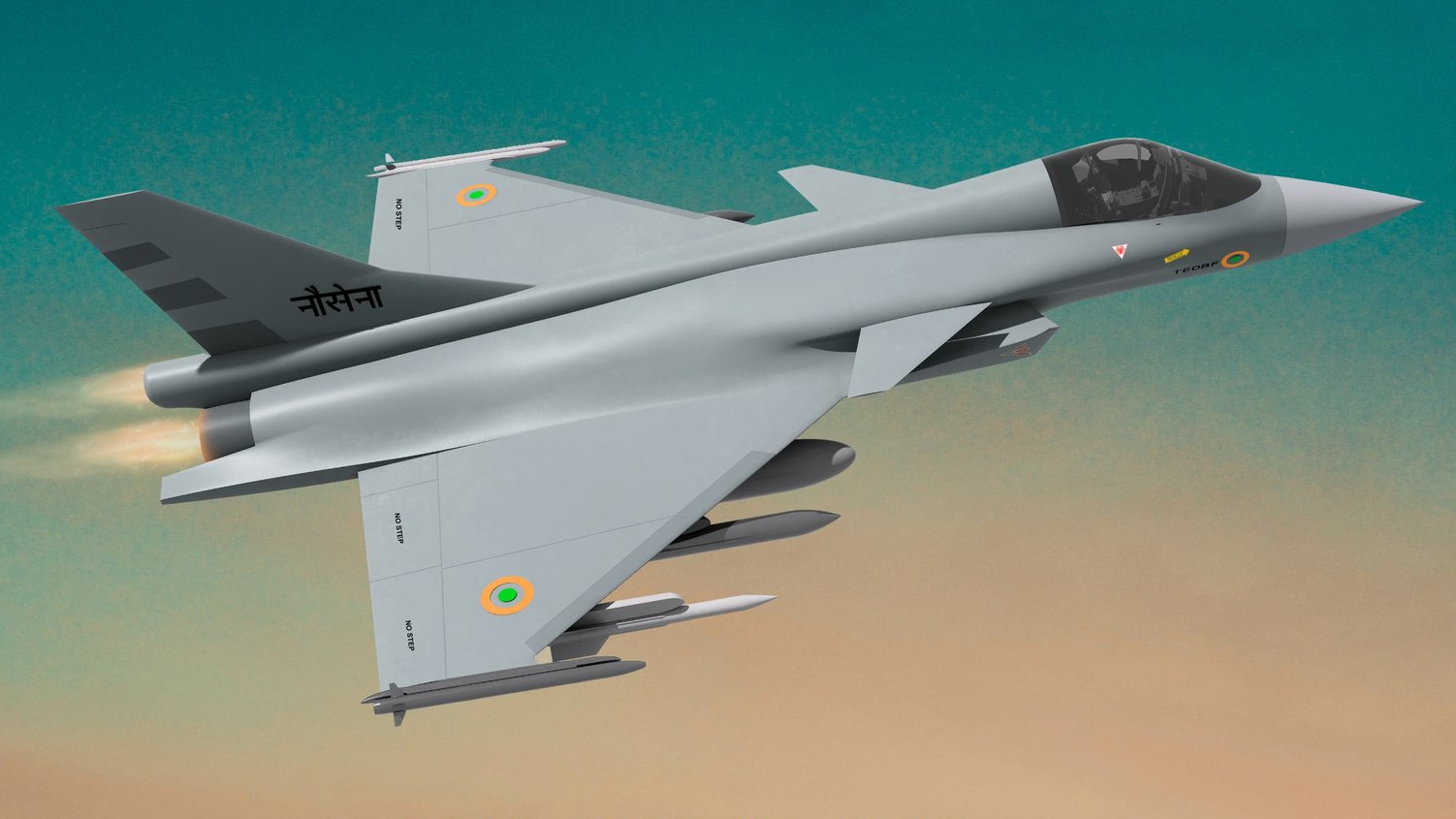
TEDBF design of the Indian Navy

When the aircraft carrier was initially conceptualised in 2012, the ship was expected to employ a carrier air wing consisting of various fighter aircraft, AEW aircraft, mid-air refuelling aircraft as well as UCAVs. The UCAVs would be tasked for high-risk reconnaissance missions as well as suppression of enemy air defences (SEAD). Further, such pilotless aircraft would also have a mission endurance of 24–36 hours with mid-air refuelling. With the incorporation of electromagnetic catapults, a wide variety of aircraft will be able to operate from the ship. HAL TEDBF, a carrier-borne fighter aircraft being developed in India, is also likely to be configured for CATOBAR operations when Vishal enters service. In 2016, Dassault Aviation had also offered its Rafale M to the Indian Navy for its IAC-II.

== See also ==
- Future of the Indian Navy
- INS Vikrant (2013)
