= Rajaram Swaminathan =

Officer in the Indian Navy

Vice Admiral Rajaram Swaminathan AVSM NM
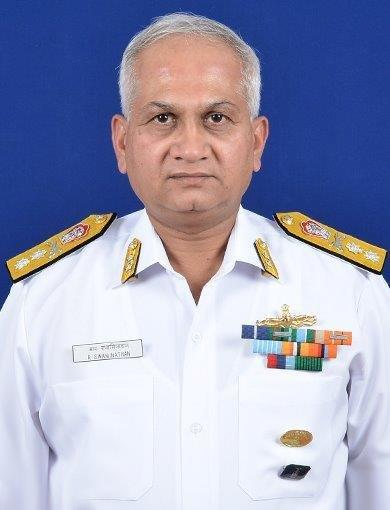
- Military career
- Allegiance: India
- Branch: Indian Navy
- Service years: 1 January 1987 - 30 November 2025
- Rank: Vice Admiral

Vice Admiral Rajaram Swaminathan is a former Flag Officer in the Indian Navy. He last served as the Controller of Warship Production and Acquisition (CWP&A). He previously served as the Director General Naval Projects(DGNP), Mumbai, Admiral Superintendent of Bombay Dockyard and Assistant Chief of Material(modernisation). He has served extensively on board the ship INS Viraat in various capacities. He is an alumnus of IIT Kharagpur, Defence Services Staff College and the National Defence College (India).

He was commissioned into the Indian Navy on 1 January 1987. In a career spanning over 30 years, he has held important operational, staff and dockyard appointments.

== Awards and decorations ==

Ati Vishisht Seva Medal	Nau Sena Medal	Samanya Seva Medal	Operation Parakram Medal
Sainya Seva Medal	Videsh Seva Medal	75th Independence Anniversary Medal	50th Independence Anniversary Medal
30 Years Long Service Medal	20 Years Long Service Medal		9 Years Long Service Medal

Military offices
Preceded by G. Srinivasan	Admiral Superintendent Naval Dockyard (Mumbai); 2020 - 2021	Succeeded by B. Sivakumar
Preceded by B. Sivakumar	Controller of Warship Production and Acquisition; 2025 - Present	Succeeded by Sanjay Sadhu
