= Kiran Deshmukh =

Flag officer in the Indian Navy

Vice Admiral Kiran Deshmukh AVSM, VSM
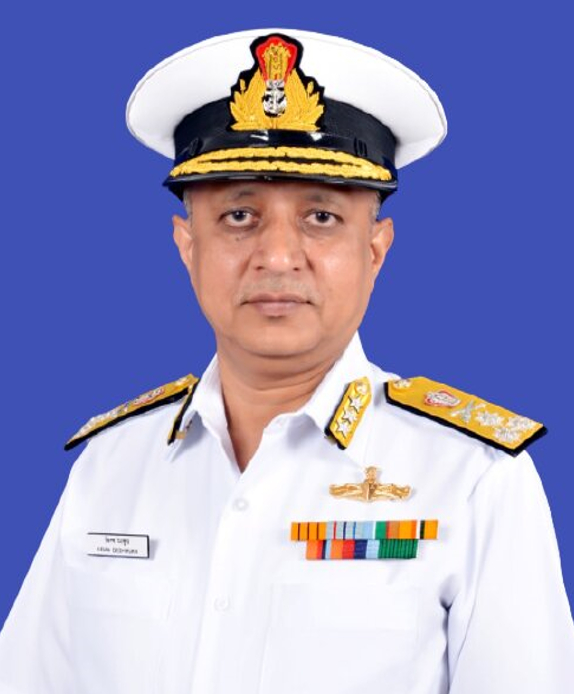
- Education: Indian Naval Academy
- Military career
- Allegiance: India
- Branch: Indian Navy
- Service years: 31 March 1986 - 31 October 2025
- Rank: Vice Admiral
- Commands: Naval Dockyard (Visakhapatnam)
- Awards: Ati Vishisht Seva Medal; Vishisht Seva Medal

Vice Admiral Kiran Deshmukh, AVSM, VSM is a former Flag officer in the Indian Navy. He last served as the Chief of Materiel. He earlier served as the Controller of Warship Production and Acquisition and as the Admiral Superintendent Naval Dockyard (Visakhapatnam).

== Early life and education ==
Deshmukh attended the Veermata Jijabai Technological Institute (VJTI) in Mumbai, where he obtained a Bachelor of Engineering degree.

== Naval career ==
Deshmukh was commissioned into the Indian Navy as an Engineer officer on 31 March 1986. He attended the Indian Institute of Technology, Madras obtaining a Master of Technology degree. He also attended the Defence Services Staff College, Wellington.

He has served onboard various frontline ships - the Rajput-class destroyers INS Ranjit (D53) and INS Ranvir (D54)and the lead ship of her class of guided-missile destroyers INS Delhi (D61). He also served as the Engineer officer on board the Talwar-class frigate INS Tabar (F44).

Ashore, he served as the Command Engineer Officer at the Eastern Naval Command, Assistant General Manager (Quality, Lab and Human Resources) and Assistant General Manager (Production) at the Naval Dockyard (Visakhapatnam). As a Commodore, he served as the General Manager (Refit) at Naval Dockyard (Visakhapatnam). He subsequently moved to NHQ as the principal director of ship production.

=== Flag rank ===
On promotion to flag rank, Deshmukh was appointed Assistant Chief of Materiel (Dockyards & Refits) at Naval headquarters (NHQ). He then moved to the Eastern Naval Command as the Chief Staff Officer (Technical) to the Flag Officer Commanding-in-Chief Eastern Naval Command. In November 2018, he was appointed Admiral Superintendent (ASD) of Naval Dockyard (Visakhapatnam). For his tenure as ASD, he was awarded the Vishisht Seva Medal on 26 January 2020. In the same month, he was promoted to the rank of Vice Admiral and took over as the Director General Naval Projects, Visakhapatnam.

After a sixteen-month tenure, he moved to NHQ and took over as the Controller of Warship Production and Acquisition (CWP&A) from Vice Admiral Sandeep Naithani. In his tenure as CWP&A, the first Indigenous Aircraft Carrier (IAC-I) was commissioned as INS Vikrant (2013). The historic first trap of HAL Tejas on board the carrier was also achieved. Apart from this, the. keel laying, launch and commissioning of a number of frontline warships and submarines were achieved in his tenure.

In December 2023, he was appointed Chief of Materiel, a principal staff officer (PSO) at NHQ. He took over from Vice Admiral Sandeep Naithani on 31 December 2023. He also is the Senior most Technical Officer in the Indian Navy.

== Awards and decorations ==
Deshmukh was awarded the Vishisht Seva Medal in 2013 and the Ati Vishisht Seva Medal in 2022.

Ati Vishisht Seva Medal	Vishisht Seva Medal	Operation Vijay Medal	Operation Parakram Medal
75th Anniversary of Independence Medal	50th Anniversary of Independence Medal		30 Years Long Service Medal
20 Years Long Service Medal		9 Years Long Service Medal	

Military offices
Preceded by Sandeep Naithani	Controller of Warship Production and Acquisition; 2021 - 2023	Succeeded by B. Sivakumar
Preceded by Sandeep Naithani	Chief of Materiel; 2023 - 2025	Succeeded by B. Sivakumar
