= Nigel Malim =

Royal Navy officer who served in the Second World War

Rear-Admiral Nigel Malim CB LVO DL
- Born: 5 April 1919
- Died: 23 August 2006 (aged 87)
- Military career
- Allegiance: United Kingdom
- Branch: Royal Navy
- Rank: Rear-Admiral
- Other work: Deputy Lieutenant for Lincolnshire

Rear-Admiral Nigel Hugh Malim CB LVO DL (5 April 1919 – 23 August 2006) was a Royal Navy officer who served in the Second World War. He survived his ship being sunk, and was later commander engineer on the Royal Yacht Britannia, district engineer for Scotland, deputy director of marine engineering, captain of the Royal Naval Engineering College Manadon and chief staff officer (technical) to the commander-in-chief of the Western Fleet.

In retirement he was a deputy to the Lord Lieutenant of Lincolnshire.

== Service career ==
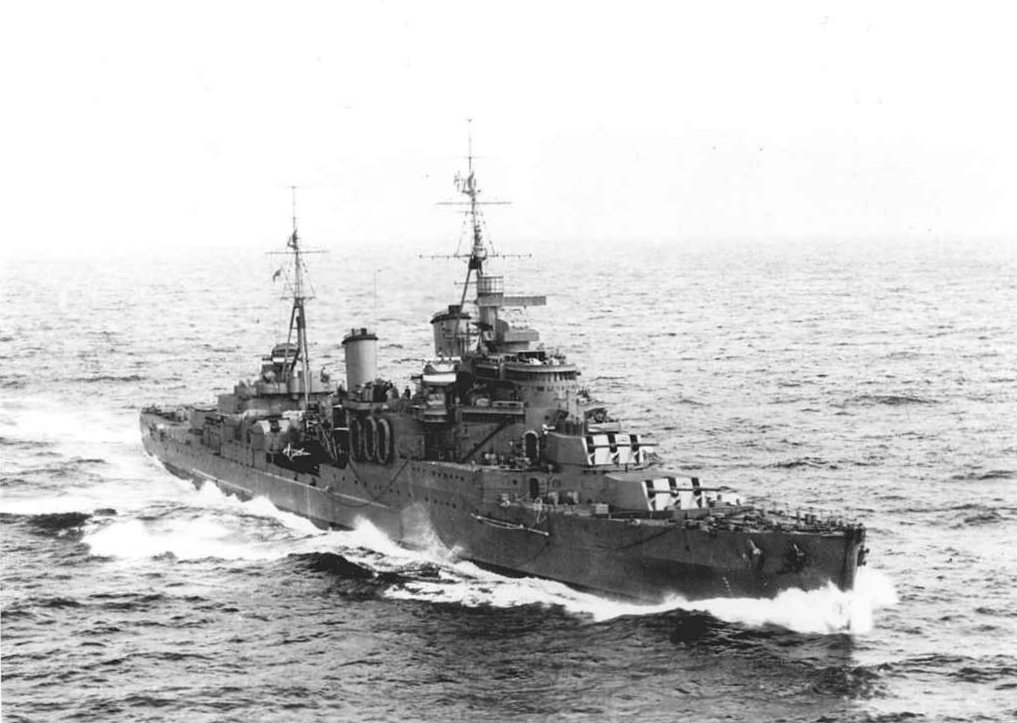
Malim's first ship, HMS Manchester

A native of Barrow upon Humber in North Lincolnshire, and the son of an engineer, Malim joined the Royal Navy as a cadet on leaving Weymouth College in 1936. In 1941 he was posted to the light cruiser HMS Manchester in Scapa Flow and was promoted lieutenant in July of that year. On 13 August 1942, Manchester was torpedoed by two Italian Navy MS -boats while part of a convoy to Malta during the Battle of the Mediterranean, and the ship was so severely damaged that her Captain decided to sink her. Making it to dry land, Malim found himself on the coast of Algeria, where he was arrested by the forces of Vichy France and interned at Laghouat. He was freed in November, thanks to the Allied invasion of French North Africa, and a few weeks later joined the heavy cruiser HMS Norfolk in the North Atlantic. He was next posted to the Royal Naval College, Greenwich, from 1943 to 1945.

After the war Malim took an advanced engineering course at Greenock. From 1945 to 1947 he served on HMS Jamaica, then was on the staff of the Royal Naval Engineering College from 1948 to 1950. After service with the Admiralty at Bath (1951–1954), a posting to the carrier HMS Triumph (1954–1956), and another spell at the Admiralty (1956–1958), he joined the Royal Yacht Britannia in 1958 as commander engineer. In 1960 he was promoted captain and became the Navy's District Overseer for Scotland (1960–1962), then assistant and later deputy director of marine engineering (1962–1965).

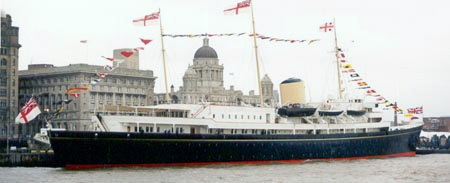
HMY Britannia

He was seconded to the Imperial Defence College in 1966 before serving as captain of the Royal Naval Engineering College Manadon from 1967 to 1969. He then completed his naval service in Portsmouth as chief staff officer (technical) to the commander-in-chief of the Western Fleet, from 1969 to 1971, with the rank of rear admiral from 7 July 1969, and retired in 1971.

== Later life ==
Malim retired to Caistor, in his home county of Lincolnshire, and became chairman of the Western European Ship Repairers Association. He was also managing director of the Humber Graving Dock and Engineering Co. at Immingham from 1972 to 1982 and in January 1988 was appointed as a Deputy Lieutenant for Lincolnshire.

== Private life ==
Malim's interests included yachting and while on Britannia he often sailed with the Duke of Edinburgh.

In 1944, at Dorchester, Malim married Moonyeen Maureen Ogilby Maynard, and they had two sons, Jeremy and Timothy, and a daughter, Marquita. Malim died on 23 August 2006 while on holiday in France. His widow died at the age of 85 in December 2007.

== Honours ==
- Member of the Royal Victorian Order, 1960
- Companion of the Order of the Bath, 1970
- Deputy Lieutenant for the County of Lincolnshire, 24 November 1987.
