= Daya Shankar (admiral) =

Indian Navy admiral and engineer

Vice Admiral Daya Shankar PVSM, DSC
- Born: 2 January 1912
- Died: 18 November 1993 (aged 81); New Delhi
- Military career
- Allegiance: British India; India
- Branch: Royal Indian Navy; Indian Navy
- Service years: 1930-1964
- Rank: Vice Admiral
- Units: HMIS Hindustan; HMIS Lawrence; HMIS Dalhousie; HMIS Pathan
- Commands: INS Shivaji
- Conflicts: Second World War
- Awards: Param Vishisht Seva Medal; Distinguished Service Cross

Vice Admiral Daya Shankar, PVSM, DSC (2 January 1912 – 18 November 1993) was an Indian Navy admiral. A pioneering naval engineer, he went on to become the first engineering officer to attain flag rank, the first Indian Chief of Materiel and the first officer from the Indian Armed Forces to serve as Controller General of Defence Production.

== Early life and education ==
Shankar was born to an engineer father. He was schooled and attended college in Allahabad. After completing a year in college, he sat for the entrance exam for the Royal Indian Marine in 1929. He stood first and opted to join the engineering branch of the RIM.

== Early career ==
Arriving in the UK in early 1930, he was assigned to join R. & W. Hawthorn, Leslie and Company in Newcastle as a premium apprentice. His apprenticeship lasted 5 years and he was appointed an engineer sub-lieutenant (on probation) in the Royal Indian Navy on 23 April 1935. He joined the Grimsby-class sloop HMIS Indus which had recently been commissioned. In July that year, he was onboard Indus during the Silver Jubilee Review at Spithead. He was confirmed in his appointment on 23 October 1936. He was promoted to Engineer lieutenant on 23 April 1938.

== World War II ==
On 2 August 1939, Shankar was assigned to HMIS Dalhousie, the RIN depot ship and training barracks based at Bombay, as well as to the P-class sloop HMIS Pathan. He was assigned to the sloop HMIS Lawrence on 21 November 1940. Other junior officers then assigned to her were future admiral and Indian Navy chief of the naval staff Sourendra Nath Kohli.

On 10 March 1942, Shankar was awarded the Distinguished Service Cross (DSC) for "courage, enterprise and devotion to duty in operations in the Persian Gulf." He was one of only three Indian officers to be so decorated during the war. On 3 December, he was assigned to the sloop HMIS Hindustan, and was promoted acting engineer lieutenant-commander on 30 September 1943. He was promoted substantive engineer lieutenant-commander on 23 April 1946.

== Post-Independence ==
Following Indian independence in 1947, Shankar served at Naval Headquarters and was promoted engineer commander (acting engineer captain) on 31 December 1948. In 1950, he became the second Indian officer to command INS Shivaji, the mechanical training establishment of the Indian Navy, with promotion to substantive engineer captain on 30 June 1951.

He was subsequently appointed the industrial manager at Naval Dockyard (Bombay), and in July 1954 became the first Indian officer to be appointed Chief of Materiel at Naval HQ. On 24 September 1956, the post of Chief of Material was upgraded to the status of a commodore (2nd class), making Shankar the first Indian naval engineer officer to be elevated to this rank.

=== Flag rank ===
Shankar was promoted to engineer rear admiral on 28 December 1959, becoming the first naval engineering officer to attain flag rank, and was appointed Controller-General Ordnance Factories. In 1960, he was further appointed Controller-General Defence Production, and held the appointment until his retirement on 20 August 1964.

== Later life ==
Retiring in Delhi, Shankar was conferred the honorary rank of vice admiral on 20 December 1985. He died at Delhi in the morning of 18 November 1993, and was cremated with full military honours the following afternoon. He was survived by his daughter and two sons, one an air commodore in the Indian Air Force.

Military offices
Preceded by D. N. Mukherji	Commanding officer INS Shivaji; 1949–1951	Succeeded by B. N. Lele
Preceded by Ian Frederick Montague Newnham	Chief of Materiel; 1954-1957	Succeeded by B. N. Lele
