= Laghouat prison camp =

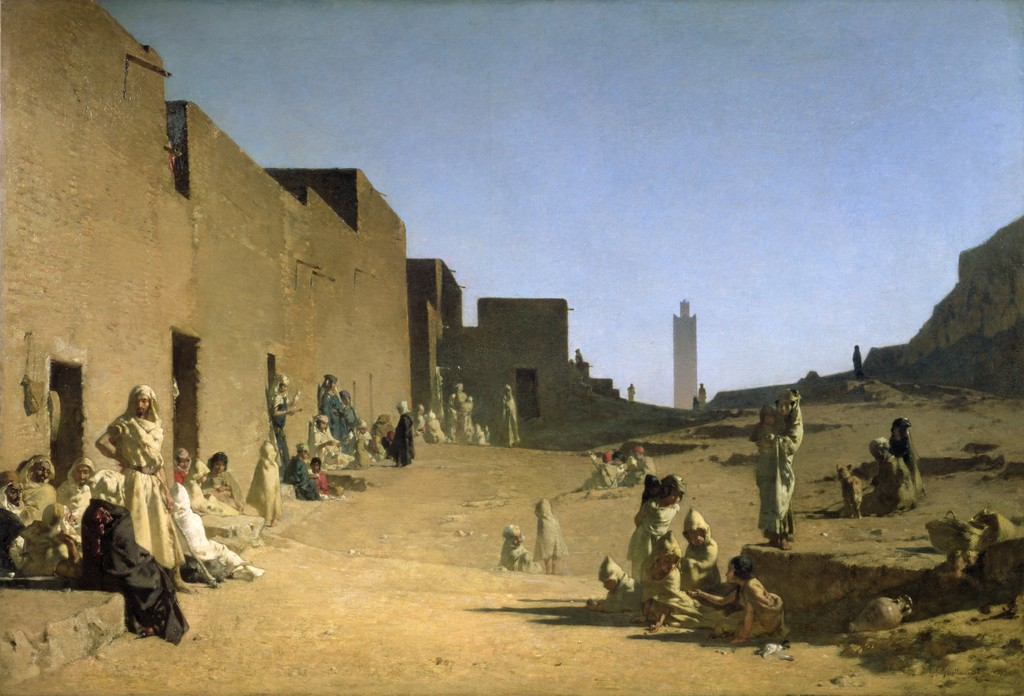
Laghouat in the Algerian Sahara by Gustave Achille Guillaumet, 1879

Laghouat prison camp was a detention centre at Laghouat in Saharan Algeria, maintained during the Second World War by Vichy France and later by the French Committee of National Liberation.

The camp was one of nine established by the French in the Sahara, primarily for dissidents, but from 1940 to 1942 it was used as an internment camp for British Empire servicemen, under the name Camp des internés britanniques Laghouat ("British Internees Camp Laghouat"). After these men were freed by Allied forces in November 1942, the camp was again used for North African internees, of whom many were communists and Jews.

== Internment camp for British and Commonwealth forces ==
Following the British Attack on Mers-el-Kébir (and elsewhere) against the French fleet on 3 July 1940, there was a state of war between Britain and Vichy France. From July 1940 until shortly after the Allied invasion of French North Africa on 8 November 1942, Laghouat was used as a de facto prisoner-of-war camp for British Empire and Commonwealth prisoners, mostly captured sailors and airmen. The internees at Laghouat included fifteen Canadians and seven men from the Dominion of Newfoundland, one of whom was held there for 472 days. There were also South Africans among the internees, and the Royal Navy personnel included sailors captured after the running aground of HMS Havock off Kelibia, Tunisia, in April 1942, and after the loss of HMS Manchester in August 1942.

One interned serviceman described the Laghouat camp as a "Beau Geste style fort based about a Saharan oasis". Those held were treated well, except that there was nothing to do and they were not allowed to leave the camp. In any event, "any escape was virtually impossible, given the expanse of desert that surrounded them". Another internee wrote to the Red Cross in Scotland from the Camp des internés britanniques Laghouat : "Technically we are not prisoners of war but up to the present have not been able to find a difference. Unfortunately 30 to 40 per cent of the articles sent in the batch of parcels were missing." In his book There and Back Again: a navigator's story (2004), former Royal Air Force navigator Douglas Hudson of 101 Squadron reports that over five hundred Allied prisoners were held in the camp. He tells of inhumane living conditions and the construction of an escape tunnel.

In November 1942 came Operation Torch, the Allied invasion of Algeria. By chance, Admiral of the Fleet François Darlan, the de facto head of the Vichy government, was in Algiers at the time and quickly made a deal with the Allies, ordering all French personnel in North Africa to join forces with the British and the Americans. The interned servicemen were quickly freed by United States troops who arrived at the Laghouat camp with a convoy of trucks in November 1942.

On 24 December 1942, Admiral Darlan was assassinated and was succeeded in his new command of French North and West Africa by Henri Giraud, who ordered the rounding up of a large number of residents, mostly Jews, and had them sent to Laghouat. He refused to give information to the Allies about those detained, or even to reveal the numbers involved, but British and American investigations in 1943 suggested that the total of detainees in the nine camps was then about 7,500, of whom a large number were described by the French authorities as communists.

== Aftermath ==
Many years later, the Canadian former prisoners at Laghouat were denied pensions under the Compensation for Former Prisoners of War Act 1976, and it was not until 1987 that the Canadian government agreed to apply the Act to those who had been held by the French at Laghouat.

== Notable internees ==
- Nigel Malim, an officer of HMS Manchester
- Charles Lamb, Fleet Air Arm pilot and author
