= G. S. Pabby =

Vice admiral in the Indian Navy

Vice Admiral G. S. Pabby AVSM, VSM
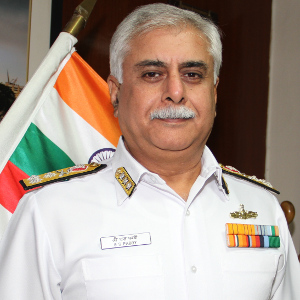
- Vice Admiral G. S. Pabby
- Military career
- Allegiance: India
- Branch: Indian Navy
- Service years: August 1980 – present
- Rank: Vice Admiral
- Commands: Chief of Material
- Awards: Ati Vishisht Seva Medal; Vishisht Seva Medal; Param Vishisht Seva Medal

Vice Admiral G. S. Pabby is a former Flag Officer in the Indian Navy. He last served as the Chief of Materiel.

== Early life and education ==
Vice Admiral GS Pabby is a graduate with an honours degree in the field of Mechanical Engineering from NIT, Kurukshetra. He completed his Master of Technology from Indian Institute of Technology Bombay (IITB) in Systems and Controls specialization. He has been recognised as a Distinguished Alumnus by IIT(Mumbai) and NIT Kurukshetra. He attended the Naval War College and College of Defence Management.

== Career ==
Pabby was commissioned into the Indian Navy in August 1980. During his more than 40 years of service in the Indian Navy, he served on Petya-class frigate, Kashin-class destroyer along with the Indian crafted and built Delhi-class destroyer. While working in the Mumbai Naval dockyard, he was included in the infrastructure planning and creation team.

Pabby was appointed as the Chief Staff Officer ( Technical) at Western Naval Command after being promoted to the rank of Rear Admiral in December 2009. He was later moved to Visakhapatnam Naval Dockyard where he took over the assignment of the Admiral Superintendent of Naval Dockyard. He supervised major refits and weapon system upgrades of many ships and Russian submarines. Later Pabby was appointed as the Director General of Naval Projects (Mumbai), where he steered the construction of new dry dock.

In his prior appointments, Pabby served as a flag officer and has been the controller for the production and acquisition of warships. In order to encourage the Indian industries into the construction of ship equipment and submarines, the admiral interacted with many industries and other professional bodies mainly focusing the micro, small and medium enterprises and was instrumental in revising policies and guidelines.

He has been awarded the Vishisht Seva Medal, the Ati Vishisht Seva Medal and Param Vishisht Seva Medals for his distinguished service. The admiral became Chief of Materiel of the Indian Navy on 31 October 2016.

== Awards and Decoration ==

Ati Vishisht Seva Medal	Vishisht Seva Medal	Samanya Seva Medal	Operation Vijay Medal
50th Anniversary of Independence Medal	30 Years Long Service Medal	20 Years Long Service Medal	9 Years Long Service Medal

== Gallery ==
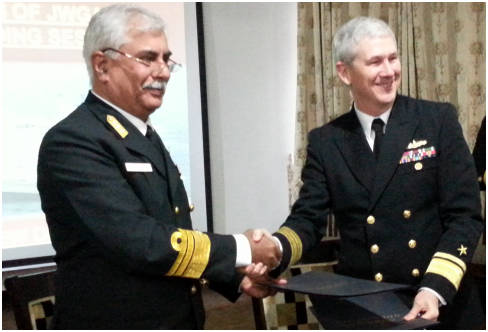
Indian Navy Vice Admiral GS Pabby with U.S. Navy RAdm Thomas J Moore

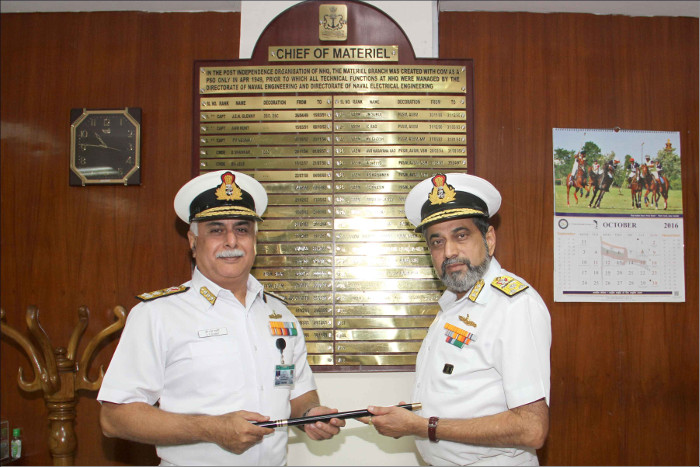
Vice Admiral GS Pabby, Chief of Material receiving batton from Vice Admiral AV Subhedar

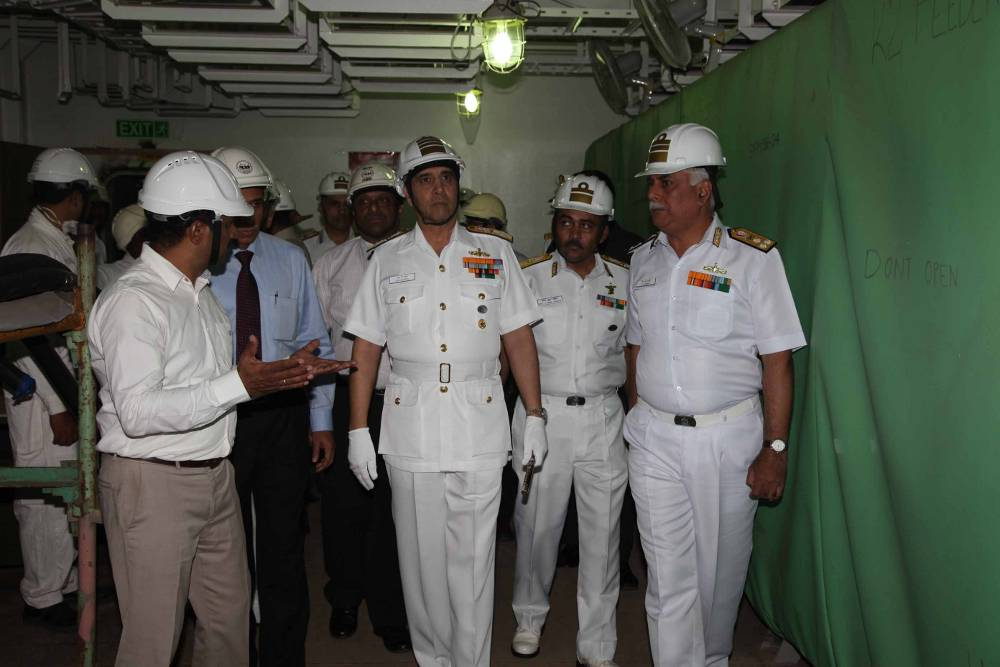
CNS Reviews the progress of INS Vikrant in Kochi

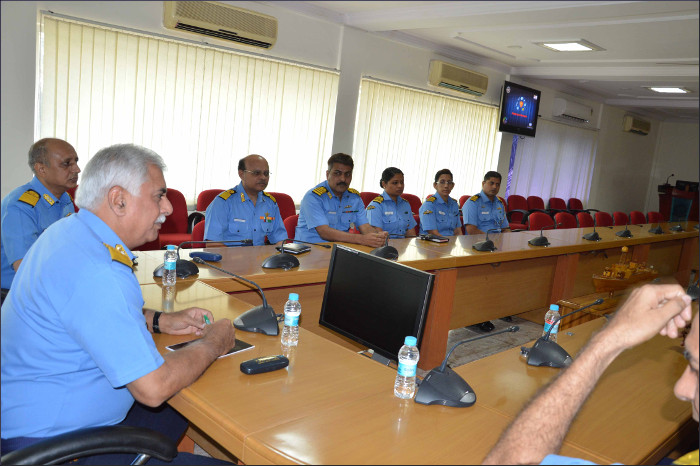
Vice_Admiral_GS_Pabby,_Chief_of_Materiel_visits_ENC

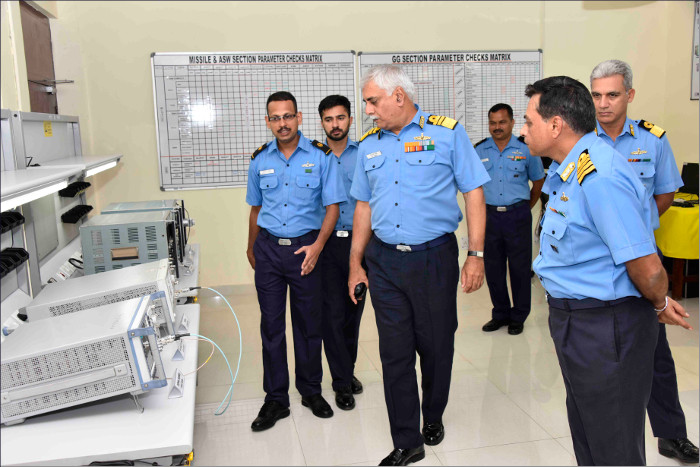
Vice_Admiral_GS_Pabby,_Chief_of_Materiel_visits_ENC_1

Military offices
Preceded by AV Subhedar	Chief of Material; 1 August 2018 - present	Succeeded by S. R. Sarma
