= Jan Aylen =

Rear-Admiral Jan Aylen CB OBE DSC
- Born: Ian Gerald Aylen; 12 October 1910
- Died: 5 November 2003 (aged 93)
- Military career
- Allegiance: United Kingdom
- Branch: Royal Navy
- Rank: Rear-Admiral
- Commands: Commander, Royal Naval Engineering College; Admiral-Superintendent, Rosyth Dockyard; HMS Caledonia
- Conflicts: Second Battle of Sirte

Rear-Admiral Ian Gerald Aylen CB OBE DSC (12 October 1910 – 5 November 2003), known as Jan Aylen, was an officer of the Royal Navy during the Second World War, eventually rising to flag rank.

== Early life ==
Aylen was born in Saltash, Cornwall and educated at Blundell's School and the Royal Naval Engineering College, Keyham, and Greenwich. He was a keen rugby player, representing Kent, Hampshire and Devon at rugby, and captained the Devonport Services R.F.C. in 1938–39. He married Alice Maltby in 1937 and with her had a son and two daughters.

== Naval career ==
Aylen served at sea, at first aboard the battleship HMS Rodney under future Admiral of the Fleet Captain Jack Tovey. Aylen then became engineer officer of the destroyer HMS Kelvin, which formed part of the 5th Destroyer Flotilla under Captain the Lord Louis Mountbatten. On one occasion, while the Kelvin was in Bombay for repairs, Aylen and a party of sailors visited the Khyber Pass. Aylen and the Kelvin then went on to see action at the Second Battle of Sirte on 22 March 1942. He received the DSC for his efforts during the action.

== Germany ==
He briefly left front-line service towards the end of the war and was based at Bath. Desiring to return to a more active role he volunteered for the 30th Assault Unit, under the intelligence officer Cdr Ian Fleming, RNVR. He advanced with General Patton's troops across the Rhine and headed for the U-boat research establishments on the Baltic coast as the German army collapsed. Aylen then moved to Flensburg with orders to gather evidence on technical aid supplied by Germany to Japan, and was involved in the questioning of the remaining senior member of the German Admiralty.

After the end of the war and between May and November 1945 he took over the Walterwerke and questioned scientist Hellmuth Walter about his work with hydrogen peroxide. He was instrumental in persuading Walter to bring their equipment to Vickers' shipyard at Barrow. Aylen was appointed OBE for his work in Germany.

== Post war ==
Aylen spent two years aboard the destroyer HMS Cossack at Hong Kong, and then at the training establishment, HMS Caledonia. Two years were spent on the Admiralty Interview Board, followed by a posting as the Home Fleet Engineering Officer, and then Admiral Superintendent at Rosyth Dockyard.

He was first appointed Commander of the Royal Naval Engineering College from 7 August 1958 to 7 July 1960 when he held the rank of Captain upon promotion to Rear-Admiral he continued as commander from 7 July 1960 to 30 July 1960.

Aylen, by now appointed CB, worked for the Institute of Mechanical Engineers after his retirement from the navy in 1962 and lived at Honiton, though he remained an active commentator on naval affairs. He died on 5 November 2003, survived by his son and daughters.

== Sources ==
- Extracted from Obituary - Rear-Admiral Jan Aylen, The Daily Telegraph, 24 November 2003
- Obituary - Rear-Admiral Jan Aylen, The Times, 25 November 2003
