= Selborne-Fisher scheme =

1903 UK naval organization doctrine

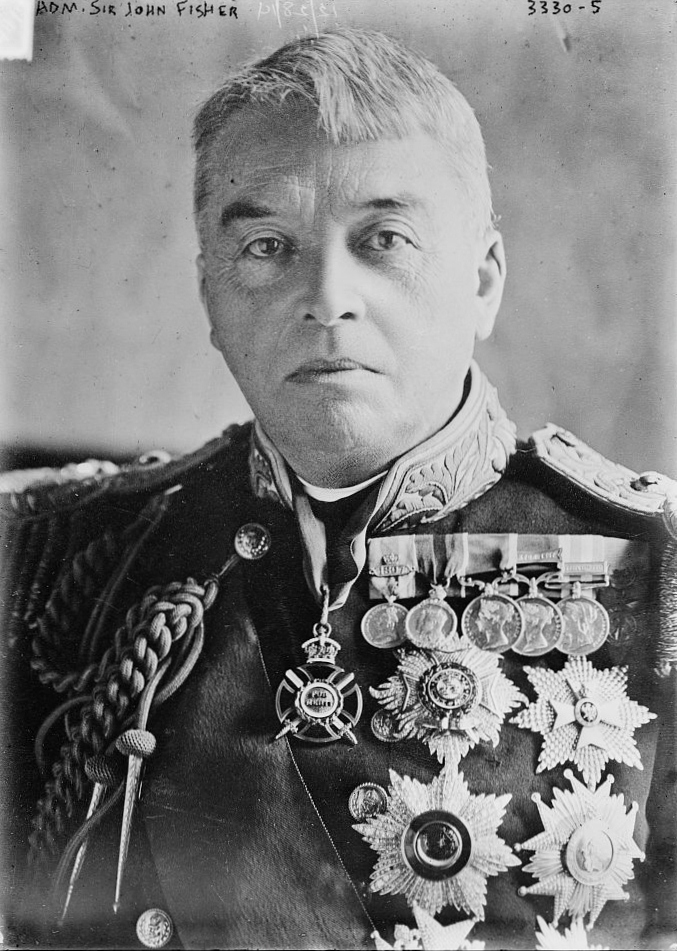
John Fisher

The Selborne-Fisher scheme, or Selborne scheme, was an effort by John Fisher, 1st Baron Fisher, Second Sea Lord, approved by William Palmer, 2nd Earl of Selborne, First Lord of the Admiralty, in 1903 to combine the military (executive) and engineering branches of the Royal Navy. The main goal was to return control over the movement of a ship to the military officer.

== Background ==
In 1902, Fisher returned to the UK (having been Commander-in-Chief of the Mediterranean Fleet) as Second Sea Lord in charge of personnel. At this time engineering officers, which had become increasingly important in the fleet as it became steadily more dependent upon machinery, were still largely looked down upon by command officers. Fisher considered it would be better for the navy if the two branches could be merged, as had been done in the past with navigation which similarly had once been a completely separate specialty. He wanted the Navy to have one system of supply, one system of entry and one system of training. His solution was to merge the cadet training of military and engineer officers, and revise the curriculum so that it provided a suitable grounding to later go on to either path.

== Integration ==
The scheme was announced in 1902, and further details emerged as time went by, such as November 1905 when the Cawdor Memorandum was published. As part of the scheme, cadets would enter the service between the ages of 12 and 13 under the same conditions, would be trained together under the same system until they passed the rank of sub-lieutenant when they would be distributed between the military branch, the engineering branch, and the Royal Marines, although ultimately the latter only briefly participated in the scheme (see below). Three months after the scheme was announced, a new Royal Naval College, Osborne, was created at Osborne House, Queen Victoria's old home on the Isle of Wight. A new facility at Dartmouth was already under construction to replace the training ship Britannia. When the final entry of engineer cadets passed through the Royal Naval Engineering College at Keyham in 1910 it was closed.

The old rank of mate was revived in 1913 for the accelerated promotion of promising enlisted personnel to become engineers. Mates ranked with, but after, sub-lieutenants and messed separately. In addition, promotion from Mate (E) was to the old Engineer Lieutenant rank, not to Lieutenant (E).

== Integration reversed ==
After World War I, opposition to the scheme gave rise to a movement to re-segregate the executive and engineering branches because during the war, officers were not able to be equally proficient at both engineering and executive duties. As part of this movement, the Royal Naval Engineering College was reopened in 1919, and in 1922 engineering training began for midshipmen, instead of sub-lieutenants. In 1921, the naval college at Osborne was no longer needed and was closed.

By 1925, there were five branches of the Service: Military, Medical, Accountant, Naval Instructor, and Artisan. That year, an Order in Council ended the scheme, splitting the service into 12 categories: Executive, Engineer, Medical, Dental, Accountant and Instructor Officers, Chaplains, Shipwrights, Ordinance and Electrical Officers, Schoolmasters and Wardmasters. Shortly afterwards, the ranks of Midshipman (E) and Sub-lieutenant (E) appeared in Orders in Council for the first time. In 1931 mate was abandoned again, and mates were re-mustered as sub-lieutenants.

The scheme left behind common entry, so all candidates for the engineering branch entered the Navy by the same route as those in the executive branch.

== Royal Marines ==
Fisher's reforms included the inclusion of officers of the Royal Marines in the common entry scheme. Only after undergoing preliminary training, and upon reaching the rank of lieutenant, were sea-going officers of all branches to be given the option of choosing the Royal Marines as a career specialisation. During the three years that this aspect of the Selbourne Scheme was in force, only two entrants choose to become marine officers; a phenomenon accounted for by more limited career prospects and possibly social prejudice within the Royal Navy of the period. In 1912 separate entry was restored for the Royal Marines.

== See also ==
- Midshipman
- Master's mate
- Sub-lieutenant
