= Chief of Materiel (Indian Navy) =

Senior appointment in the Indian Navy

- Flag of the Vice Admiral

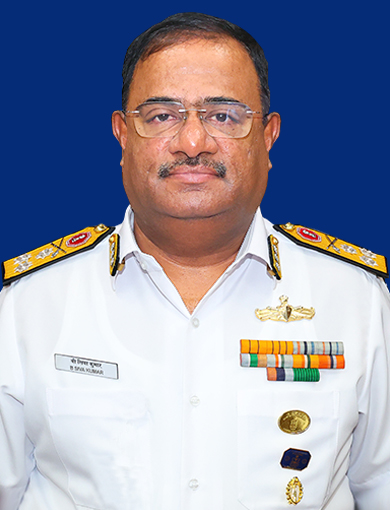
- Incumbent; Vice Admiral B. Sivakumar AVSM VSM since 1 November 2025
- Indian Navy
- Type: Principal Staff Officer
- Abbreviation: COM
- Reports to: Chief of the Naval Staff
- Seat: Naval Headquarters, New Delhi

The Chief of Materiel (COM) is a senior Indian Navy appointment in the rank of Vice-Admiral. As a Principal Staff Officer (PSO) at Naval Headquarters (NHQ), the COM is responsible for all aspects of maintenance management and life-cycle support of all engineering, electrical, electronic, weapons, sensors, and IT-related systems for ships and submarines, along with responsibility for the creation of major marine and technical infrastructure. The present COM is Vice Admiral B. Sivakumar, who succeeded Vice Admiral Kiran Deshmukh on 1 November 2025.

== History ==
In 1949, the Naval headquarters was reorganised and appointment of Chief of Material (COM) was created. The appointment was held by an officer of the rank of Captain. The COM was to look after the material resources of the service. The Director of Naval engineering, Staff Officer (Dockyard), Director Armament Supply and the Director of Electrical Engineering reported into the COM.

The appointment was filled by the Chief of Administration as an additional charge until the early 1950s. Captain Daya Shankar, DSC was the first Indian to serve as the COM full-time.

== Organisation ==
The COM heads the Materiel Branch at the Naval Headquarters. The following Directors General/Controllers/Assistant Principal Staff Officers report into the COM:

- Controller of Logistics
  - Assistant Controller of Logistics
- Assistant Chief of Materiel (Nuclear System Maintenance)
- Assistant Chief of Materiel (Information Technology & Systems)
- Assistant Chief of Materiel (Dockyard & Refit)
- Assistant Chief of Materiel (Modernisation)

== Appointees ==
S.No.	Name	Assumed office	Left office	Notes
	Captain Bhaskar Sadashiv Soman	14 November 1948	April 1949	While also serving as Chief of Administration.
1	Captain John Edward Maxwell Glenny DSO, DSC	26 April 1949	15 March 1951	Seconded from the Royal Navy. While also serving as Chief of Administration.
2	Captain Albert Henry Fitch Hunt	15 March 1951	6 October 1952	Seconded from the Royal Navy.
3	Captain Ian Frederick Montague Newnham	7 October 1952	20 November 1954	Seconded from the Royal Navy. Last British appointee.
4	Commodore Daya Shankar DSC	20 November 1954 (Note: Post upgraded to Commodore 2nd Class on 24 September 1956.)	1 September 1957	First Indian appointee.
5	Commodore Bhalchandra Nagesh Lele MBE	15 December 1957	21 July 1958	
6	Commodore Pabitra Kumar Mukerjee	22 July 1958	4 June 1960	
7	Commodore Baldan Singh Baswani	4 June 1960	8 January 1962	
8	Commodore Sardarilal Mathradas Nanda	20 February 1962	13 May 1962	
9	Commodore C. L. Bhandari	15 May 1962	21 January 1963	Officiating.
10	Commodore Sourendra Nath Kohli	21 January 1963	20 December 1964	
11	Rear Admiral P. S. Mahindroo	11 February 1965 (Note: Post upgraded to Rear Admiral 17 August 1965.)	19 December 1967	
12	Rear Admiral Vasudeva Anant Kamath	15 January 1968	22 December 1968	
13	Rear Admiral Kamalakar Laxman Kulkarni	23 December 1968	12 March 1973	
14	Vice Admiral Rajendra Tandon PVSM, AVSM	26 March 1973 (Note: Post upgraded to Vice-Admiral in March 1973.)	30 June 1976	
15	Vice Admiral J. T. G. Pereira PVSM, AVSM	1 July 1976	30 June 1979	
16	Vice Admiral A. K. Bhatia PVSM, AVSM, VSM	1 July 1979	31 January 1983	
17	Vice Admiral Narendra Bhalla AVSM	1 February 1983	29 March 1985	
18	Vice Admiral L.R. Mehta	30 March 1985	20 December 1985	
19	Vice Admiral S.B.N. Singh PVSM, AVSM	28 February 1986	30 November 1989	
20	Vice Admiral J. N. Sukul PVSM, AVSM	30 November 1989	31 December 1990	
21	Vice Admiral I. C. Rao PVSM, AVSM	31 December 1990	31 March 1993	
22	Vice Admiral Mauli Bhushan Ghosh PVSM, AVSM, NM	31 March 1993	31 January 1994	
23	Vice Admiral A.V.R. Narayana Rao PVSM, AVSM, VSM	28 March 1994	31 August 1995	
24	Vice Admiral Adolph Britto PVSM, AVSM, VSM	31 August 1995	30 April 1997	
25	Vice Admiral A. S. Krishnan PVSM, AVSM, VSM	30 April 1997	31 December 2001	
26	Vice Admiral P. C. Bhasin PVSM, AVSM, VSM	31 December 2001	30 January 2004	
27	Vice Admiral Parvesh Jaitly	30 January 2004	31 August 2005	
28	Vice Admiral D. S. P. Verma AVSM, VSM	31 August 2005	30 November 2007	
29	Vice Admiral Birinder Singh Randhawa AVSM, VSM	30 November 2007	30 December 2008	
30	Vice Admiral Dilip Deshpande AVSM, VSM	31 December 2008	31 October 2009	
31	Vice Admiral Ganesh Mahadevan AVSM, VSM	31 October 2009	30 April 2012	
32	Vice Admiral B. Kannan AVSM, VSM	30 April 2012	31 October 2012	
33	Vice Admiral N. N. Kumar AVSM, VSM	31 October 2012	31 March 2014	
34	Vice Admiral K. R. Nair AVSM, VSM	31 March 2014	31 May 2015	
35	Vice Admiral A. V. Subhedar PVSM, AVSM, VSM	31 May 2015	31 October 2016	
36	Vice Admiral G. S. Pabby PVSM, AVSM, VSM	31 October 2016	1 September 2020	
37	Vice Admiral S. R. Sarma AVSM, VSM	1 September 2020	31 May 2021	
38	Vice Admiral Sandeep Naithani AVSM, VSM	1 June 2021	31 December 2023	
39	Vice Admiral Kiran Deshmukh AVSM, VSM	1 January 2024	31 October 2025	
40	Vice Admiral B. Sivakumar AVSM, VSM	1 November 2025	Present	
