= Charles Lamb (Royal Navy officer) =

Commander Charles Bentall Lamb DSO DSC Royal Navy (1914–1981) was an officer in the Fleet Air Arm during World War II. He piloted a Fairey Swordfish torpedo strike reconnaissance aircraft at the Battle of Taranto, and later wrote a best selling book on his experiences called To War in a Stringbag.

== Early life ==
Lamb was born on 11 April 1914 in Bolton, Lancashire. He was the son of Arthur Lamb and Violet Aubrey Bentall.

On 20 September 1939, he married Josephine Frances Elgar; they later had two sons.

== Career Before World War II ==
In 1930, he went to sea as an apprentice with the Clan Line. Like many merchant navy officers Lamb joined the Royal Naval Reserve, appointed a midshipman 31 March 1933, and in December joined the battleship HMS Rodney in the Home Fleet and West Indies for four months' training.

On return to England in 1934, he passed his Board of Trade examinations in London. "When we had passed, our brand new Board of Trade Certificates of Competence were useless. In the depression of the early Thirties there were so many [merchant] ships laid up that jobs afloat were virtually unobtainable."

Keen to learn to fly, Lamb joined the Royal Air Force (RAF) in 1935 and flew for RAF Coastal Command for three years. The RAF controlled British naval aviation up to 1938. When the Fleet Air Arm was constituted in 1938 Lamb transferred to the Air Branch of the Royal Navy, becoming a sub-lieutenant (aviation) on 13 June 1938 with seniority dated 28 October 1936 He was promoted to lieutenant (aviation) on 28 October 1938. On 27 February 1939 he joined Torpedo Strike Reconnaissance Squadron 822 on the aircraft carrier HMS Courageous in the Home Fleet.

== Boxing ==
Lamb was taught to box by a padre called Canon Brady at a mission in Buenos Aires when he was an apprentice for Clan Line. He made one professional appearance as a boxer under the name of 'Seaman Benson', to gain experience and to raise money for the mission. As a midshipman on Rodney he boxed for the Navy as a light-weight in the 1934 Inter-Service Championships. In 1936 he won the RAF Officers' championships as a light-weight, and boxed for the RAF in the 1936 Inter-Service Championships. Two years later, he boxed for the Navy in the 1938 Inter-Service Championships.

== Second World War ==
In the early part of the war, he was a Swordfish pilot. "Charles Lamb flew in the thick of the action, mine-laying and U-boat hunting over northern Europe, harrying E-boats at Dunkirk, to being one of the two Swordfish Pathfinder pilots with 815 Squadron FAA at the Battle of Taranto." He flew in the Greek campaign of 1941 and was shot down during an air raid on Malta.

In September 1941 Lamb's aircraft was wrecked while landing a secret agent in French North Africa and he was held by the Vichy French government at the Laghouat prison camp for a year, until freed by the Allied Allied invasion of Algeria in November 1942. After treatment for malnutrition, he spent a year recruiting flying cadets for the Fleet Air Arm, until passed fit for flying in December 1943, and joined the aircraft carrier HMS Implacable as Lieutenant-Commander (Flying), with an acting rank of lieutenant-commander. Aboard HMS Indefatigable as Lieutenant-Commander (Flying) from May 1944, he escorted Arctic convoys and launched air strikes against the German battleship Tirpitz. He served in Implacable again as Lieutenant-Commander (Flying) from 8 January 1945 until July 1945; after a catastrophic flight deck injury (struck by a broken aircraft propeller) he was hospitalized for two years before returning to naval duty.

== Post war ==
Lamb was given a permanent commission in the Executive Branch of the Royal Navy as lieutenant-commander on 1 August 1945, with seniority from 28 June 1944. He served on the staff of Flag Officer (Air) (Home) at RN Air Station, Lee-on-Solent (HMS Daedalus). He was promoted to commander on 31 December 1949, and served at RN Air Station, Lossiemouth (HMS Fulmar) from 21 January 1950.

He was commanding officer of the fishery protection vessel HMS Welcome from 7 March 1953. Welcome was an Algerine class ocean minesweeper displacing about 1000 tons, completed in 1945, and used for fishery protection. From 23 October 1953, he was Commander (General Training) and Staff Officer (Flying) to Flag Officer Ground Training at RN Air Station, Lee-on-Solent (HMS Daedalus).

He was on the books of HMS President for miscellaneous duties from 26 September 1955. He was Assistant Commandant, Joint School of Warfare (Old Sarum), 1956–1958; and retired on 29 July 1958.

== Retirement ==
Lamb remained active in naval and public affairs until his death on 28 May 1981. He founded & managed the White Ensign Association, 1958–1973, a financial advisory service for redundant and retiring naval officers. His memoirs To War in a Stringbag, were published in 1977. They have been republished several times and are still in print.
