= Edward Dyke Acland =

Royal Navy Rear-Admiral (1878–1968)

Rear-Admiral Edward Dyke Acland CB MVO
- Born: 7 December 1878
- Died: 11 March 1968 (aged 89)
- Military career
- Allegiance: United Kingdom
- Branch: Royal Navy
- Rank: Rear-Admiral
- Conflicts: First World War
- Awards: MVO, CB

Rear-Admiral Edward Leopold Dyke Acland CB MVO (7 December 1878 – 11 March 1968), a member of the ancient Acland family of Devon, was a Royal Navy officer who served as Naval Attaché to King George V.

Acland was the eldest son of Rev. Henry Dyke Acland (born 1850), Rector of Nymet St George, Devon, by his wife Clementina Hart Davis. He was a great-grandson of Sir Thomas Dyke Acland, 10th Baronet (1787-1871) of Killerton, Devon. He was educated at Bedford School and served in the Royal Navy during the First World War. Between 1930 and 1933, he was Commander of the Royal Naval Engineering College, Keyham, Devon. In 1933, he became Naval Attaché to King George V. He retired from the Royal Navy in 1937.

In 1917, Edward Dyke Acland was appointed MVO and, in 1937, he was appointed CB.

In 1910, Edward Dyke Acland married Phyllis Mary Whipple, with whom he had two children. He died at the age of 89. His wife died five years later, on 25 September 1973.
