= Royal Naval Engineering College =

Coordinates: 50.385°N 4.183°W

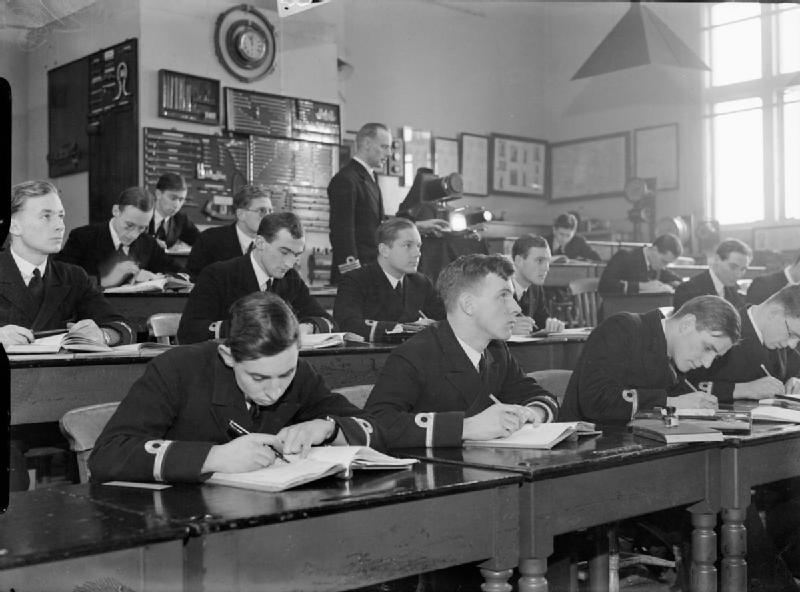
- Officers being trained during the Second World War
- Active: 1880–1995
- Country: United Kingdom
- Branch: Royal Navy
- Type: Training
- Role: Engineering
- Garrison/HQ: Plymouth

The Royal Naval Engineering College was a specialist establishment for the training of Royal Navy engineers. It was founded as Keyham College in 1880, new buildings were opened in Manadon, Devon in 1940 and the old college site at Keyham closed in 1958. The college was renamed HMS Thunderer in 1946, and closed in 1995.

== RNEC Keyham ==
Construction of Keyham College on the dockside in the Keyham suburb of Plymouth started in February 1879, at a cost of £30,000 and opened in July 1880 as Training Schools for Engineer Students, replacing the hulk of HMS Marlborough which had been used as accommodation for engineering students since 1877. Students spent five years living at the college, and undergoing training in workshops around the dockyard, before spending a further two years at the Royal Naval College, Greenwich and then assigned to ships as Assistant Engineers.

The college originally only contained accommodation, replacing that provided by Marlborough, but an additional building was later constructed containing lecture theatres, a laboratory and a gymnasium which was subsequently converted to a test engineering shop. The two buildings were connected by a bridge. Later further workshops were added, as was a covered parade ground. An extension to provide accommodation for an additional 50 students was built in 1895–1897.

The Selborne-Fisher scheme of 1903 meant that engineering and deck officers received the same basic training and led to the closure of the college in 1910. However it reopened in July 1913 to train the new scheme engineer officers. On the outbreak of the First World War the following year the students were sent off to serve on warships and the college turned over to special entry cadet training. After the war, the college reverted to engineer training.

== RNEC Manadon ==
Plans were announced in 1937 to move the college to Manadon, and the new college opened in May 1940 at the manor house, expanding rapidly during the Second World War. By 1945 there were several new permanent and temporary buildings on the site, and the original manor house was being used for staff accommodation.

In December 1946 the RNEC Manadon had been renamed HMS Thunderer. Further permanent building work took place following the end of the war, with a recreation block completed in 1947, and the instructional block, boiler house and factory workshop completed in 1951.

The old Keyham College closed in 1958 and was converted to the Dockyard Technical College, reopening in November 1959. The buildings were demolished in 1985.

HMS Thunderer produced around 150 RN engineer officers each year. In addition, a small number of seaman branch officers read for undergraduate arts degrees at the college. This continued until 1995 with the final Manadon students completing their 3rd year of BEng or BA degrees at Plymouth University in 1996. In parallel, in-service first degree education transferred to the University of Southampton from 1994. Postgraduate application training that had previously been conducted at RNEC Manadon transferred to HMS Sultan (marine and air engineering) and HMS Collingwood (weapon engineering). Various artefacts from the instructional blocks and Wardroom at RNEC Manadon are on display at these two establishments.

The site of the former RNEC at Manadon was sold off and has now been transformed into housing.

== Commanding officers ==
Included

- Commander R. W. Hope, – 1 June 1880 – 20 December 1880
- Commander W. M. Annesley, – 20 December 1883 – 20 December 1885
- Commander W. D. Morrish, – 20 December 1885 – 7 January 1892
- Commander T. B. Triggs, – 7 January 1892 – 6 January 1895
- Commander A. B. Grenfell – 6 January 1895 – 7 January 1898
- Commander H. Talbot, – 7 January 1898 – 1 October 1900
- Commander A. E. Tizard, – 1 October 1900 – 6 December 1902
- Captain Robert S. Lowry, – 6 December 1902 – 6 December 1905
- Rear-Admiral T. H. Martyn Jerram, – 6 December 1905 – 30 July 1908
- Captain L. G. Tufnell, CMG – 30 July 1908 – 15 August 1913
- Engineer Captain C. G. Taylor, – MVO, 15 August 1913 – 14 September 1914
- Captain G. R. Mansell, MVO – 14 September 1914 – 23 August 1918
- Captain H. J. T. Marshall, – 23 August 1918 – 1 January 1920
- Engineer Captain H. Lashmore, CB DSO – 1 January 1920 – 13 September 1921
- Engineer Rear-Admiral H. Lashmore, CB DSO – 13 September 1921 – 2 January 1922
- Engineer Captain R. B. Morison, CMG – 2 January 1922 – 1 January 1925
- Engineer Captain E. P. St J. Benn, CB ADC – 1 January 1925 – 11 April 1927
- Engineer Rear-Admiral E. P. St J. Benn, CB ADC – 11 April 1927 – 7 August 1927
- Engineer Captain A. L. Picton, – 7 August 1927 – 7 June 1930
- Engineer Captain E. L. D. Acland, MVO ADC – 7 June 1930 – 19 September 1933
- Engineer Rear-Admiral R. C. Boddie, CVO DSO ADC – 19 September 1933 – 2 December 1936
- Engineer Captain T. Spalding, – 2 December 1936 – 21 December 1938
- Engineer Captain C. J. G. MacKenzie, CVO – 21 December 1938 – 27 November 1941
- Captain (E) B. L. G. Sebastian, ADC – 27 November 1941 – 29 March 1944
- Captain (E) W. D. Brown, DSO – 29 March 1944 – 6 November 1946
- Captain (E) F. V. Stopford, ADC – 6 November 1946 – 5 November 1948
- Captain (E) J. G. C. Given, CBE – 5 November 1948 – 16 November 1951
- Captain (E) L A B Peile, DSO MVO – 16 November 1951 – 19 December 1953
- Captain C Gatey, CBE – 19 December 1953 – 26 May 1956
- Captain Sir John Walsham, Bt OBE – 26 May 1956 – 7 August 1958
- Captain Ian G. Aylen, OBE DSO – 7 August 1958 – 7 July 1960
- Rear-Admiral Ian G. Aylen, OBE DSO – 7 July 1960 – 30 July 1960
- Captain R. C. Paige, – 30 July 1960 – 30 August 1962
- Captain W. T. C. Ridley, OBE – 30 August 1962 – 26 October 1964
- Captain W. B. S. Milln, MVO – 26 October 1964 – 28 March 1967
- Captain N. H. Malim, MVO – 28 March 1967 - 24 June 1969
- Captain D. G. Satow, – 24 June 1969 – 22 April 1971
- Captain C. P. H. Gibbon, – 22 April 1971 – 31 May 1973
- Captain W. T. Pillar, – 31 May 1973 – 29 October 1975
- Captain R. G. Baylis, OBE – 29 October 1975 – 9 May 1978
- Captain P. G. Hammersley, OBE – 9 May 1978 – 2 June 1980
- Captain G. G. W. Marsh, OBE MA – 2 June 1980 – 31 July 1982
- Captain R. V. Holley, – 31 July 1982 – 17 August 1984
- Captain R. A. Isaac, – 17 August 1984 – 5 August 1986
- Captain I. H. Pirnie, ADC MA – 5 August 1986 – 16 February 1988
- Captain J. A. Marshall, LVO – 16 February 1988 – 20 April 1990
- Captain T. J. England – 20 April 1990 – 7 August 1992
- Captain D. G. Littlejohns, – 7 August 1992 – 25 May 1994
- Captain B. M. Leavey, – 25 May 1994 – 5 July 1994
- Captain P. A. M. Thomas – 5 July 1994
