= INS Valsura =

Indian Navy technological training institution

INS Valsura
- Jamnagar, Gujarat in India
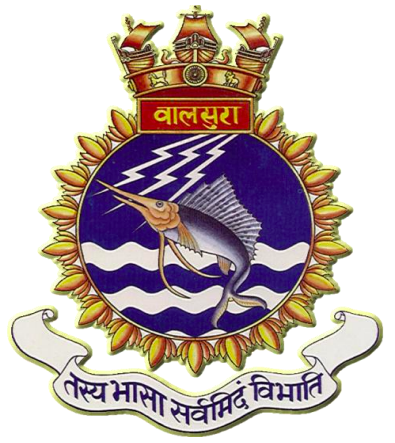
- Crest of INS Valsura

Site information
- Type: Naval shore establishment
- Owner: Ministry of Defence
- Operator: Indian Navy
- Condition: Operational
- Website: INS Valsura

Site history
- In use: 1942 – present

Garrison information
- Current commander: Commodore Rahul Sharma
- Past commanders: M. R. Schunker; Sandeep Naithani; Gautam Marwaha

INS Valsura is a "stone frigate" (shore establishment) of the Indian Navy in Jamnagar, Gujarat. A premier technological training institution, it houses the Electrical school of the Indian Navy.

== History ==
During World War II, a need was felt to supplement the torpedo handling and operations in India by establishing a torpedo school. Since a torpedo school required waters where torpedo running and depth charge firing could be possible, a suitable location had to be selected. Since Cochin already had multiple establishments, the P-class destroyer HMS Pathfinder (G10) then in India was tasked with scouting a suitable location. Pathfinder found the sea area around Rozi island in Nawanagar State. Rozi Island was already a well-known port and was connected to Jamnagar by road and railway.

The Jam Sahib of Nawanagar, Digvijaysinhji Ranjitsinhji offered the Rozi Island, his 38-acre game reserve, for a token rent of Re. 1 per annum. HMIS Valsura was commissioned on 15 December 1942 by the Maharani Gulab Kunverba Sahiba with Field Marshal Sir Claude Auchinleck, the Commander-in-Chief, India and Admiral Sir Herbert Fitzherbert, the Flag Officer Commanding, Royal Indian Navy in attendance. As the torpedo school of the Royal Indian Navy, the establishment was modelled after the Royal Navy's torpedo school HMS Vernon in Portsmouth. Commander MFB Ward was the first commanding officer of the establishment. Apart from training officers and men for torpedo duties, it also trained them on electrical duties.

After the Independence of India, the torpedo school was moved to Cochin. The Jam Sahib donated another 600 acres for the expansion of the establishment. Since a separate branch for Naval Electrical Engineering was formed in the Navy, the Naval Electrical Engineering school was founded in 1948 at Valsura. On 26 January 1950, India became a republic and the name changed to INS Valsura. Commander D. H. R. Dadabhoy was the first Indian commanding officer.

== Today ==
INS Valsura today houses the electrical equipment school, electrical technology school, basic electrical school, information technology school, center for electronics engineering and the training design and evaluation cell. Valsura was awarded a Special Unit Citation in December 2001, an honour normally reserved for operational units. The base has grown into a large township with a military hospital and schools. The commanding officer of the establishment is also the station commander and is a one-star officer with the rank of Commodore.

== Crest and motto ==
The name of the establishment was derived from the combination of two Tamil words Vaalu meaning sword and Sorrah meaning fish. Swordfish was chosen since the Torpedo bomber Fairey Swordfish was named so as well as the fact that they were found in the waters off the coast of Saurashtra. The crest of the school showed a swordfish placed amidst two crossed torpedoes and a mine with the Latin motto Valsura Semper Viret, meaning Valsura shall always be victorious.

After India became a republic, in 1950, the crest was changed. The swordfish was shown leaping out from the sea with its head and a large part of its body above water, with three streaks of lightning emanating from its head. The motto was changed to Tasya Bhasa Sarvamidam Vibhati which meant The light that emanates from here, illuminates all, which was taken from the Upanishad.

== See also ==
- List of Indian Navy bases
- List of active Indian Navy ships
- Stone frigate
