= Controller of Warship Production and Acquisition =

Senior appointment in the Indian Navy

Controller of Warship Production & Acquisition
- Flag of the Vice Admiral

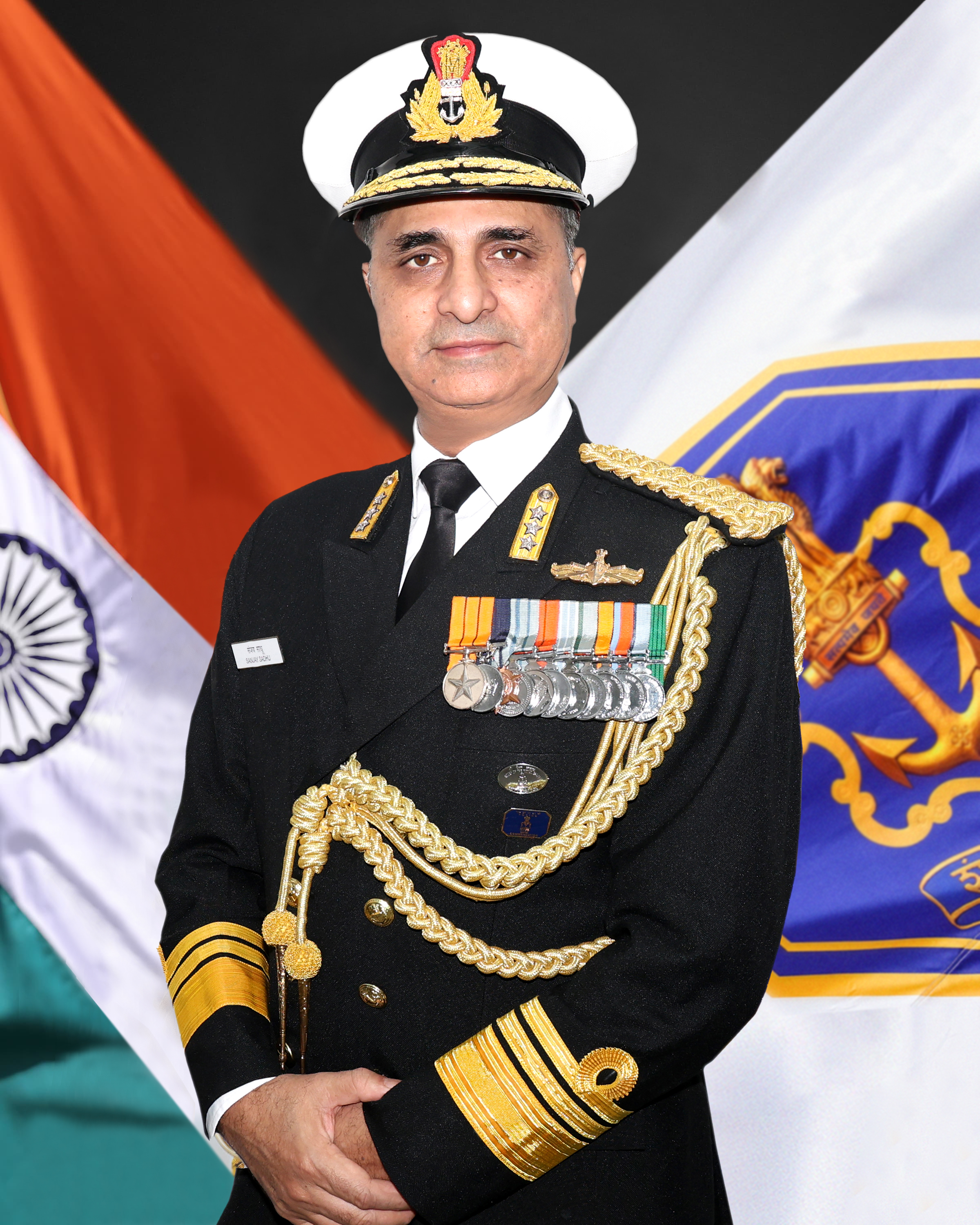
- Incumbent; Vice Admiral Sanjay Sadhu AVSM NM since 1 December 2025
- Indian Navy
- Type: Controller
- Abbreviation: CWP&A
- Reports to: Vice Chief of the Naval Staff
- Seat: Naval Headquarters, New Delhi
- First holder: Vice Admiral Laxminarayan Ramdas
- Deputy: Assistant Controller Warship Production & Acquisition

The Controller of Warship Production and Acquisition (CWP&A) is a senior appointment in the Indian Navy. A controller in the rank of Vice-Admiral, the CWP&A is responsible for the acquisition of all ships and submarines under production at shipyards, both Indian and foreign. The present CWP&A is Vice Admiral Sanjay Sadhu, who succeeded Vice Admiral Rajaram Swaminathan on 1 December 2025.

== History ==
The billet of Controller of Warship Production and Acquisition was created after the Second cadre review and placed under the Vice Chief of the Naval Staff. The Assistant CWP&A and Director General Naval Design (DGND) reported into the CWP&A. While the ACWP&A had the directorates of ship acquisition, submarine acquisition and ship systems development under it, the DGND had the directorate of naval design. On 1 April 1985, Vice Admiral Laxminarayan Ramdas took over as the first CWP&A. In May 1986, the Submarine Design Group (SDG) was formed under the DGND, and in March 1987, the Directorate of Equipment was merged with the Directorate of Contracts under the CWP&A.

== Organisation ==
The CWP&A is the controller of acquisition of all ships and submarines under production at shipyards, both Indian and foreign. He heads the design directorates of the Navy responsible for designing ships and submarines and also the steering directorates project ships and submarines under construction. The billet reports into the Vice Chief of the Naval Staff. The following Directors General/Assistant Principal Staff Officers report into the CWP&A:

- Assistant Controller of Warship Production & Acquisition
  - Directorate of Ship Production
  - Directorate of Contracts & Cost Management
- Assistant Controller of Carrier Projects
  - Directorate of Aircraft Carrier Projects
- Assistant Chief of the Naval Staff (Submarines)
  - Directorate of Submarine Acquisition
- Director General Naval Design (Surface Ship Design Group)
  - Directorate of Naval Design (Surface Ship Design Group)
- Director General Naval Design (Submarines Design Group)
  - Assistant Director General Naval Design (Submarines Design Group)
  - Directorate of Naval Design (Submarine Design Group)

== Bibliography ==
- Hiranandani, Gulab Mohanlal (2005), Transition to eminence : The Indian Navy 1976-1990, Lancer Publishers, ISBN 978-8170622666
