= Naval Dockyard (Mumbai) =

Shipyard in Mumbai, India

Coordinates: 18°55′43″N 72°50′28″E

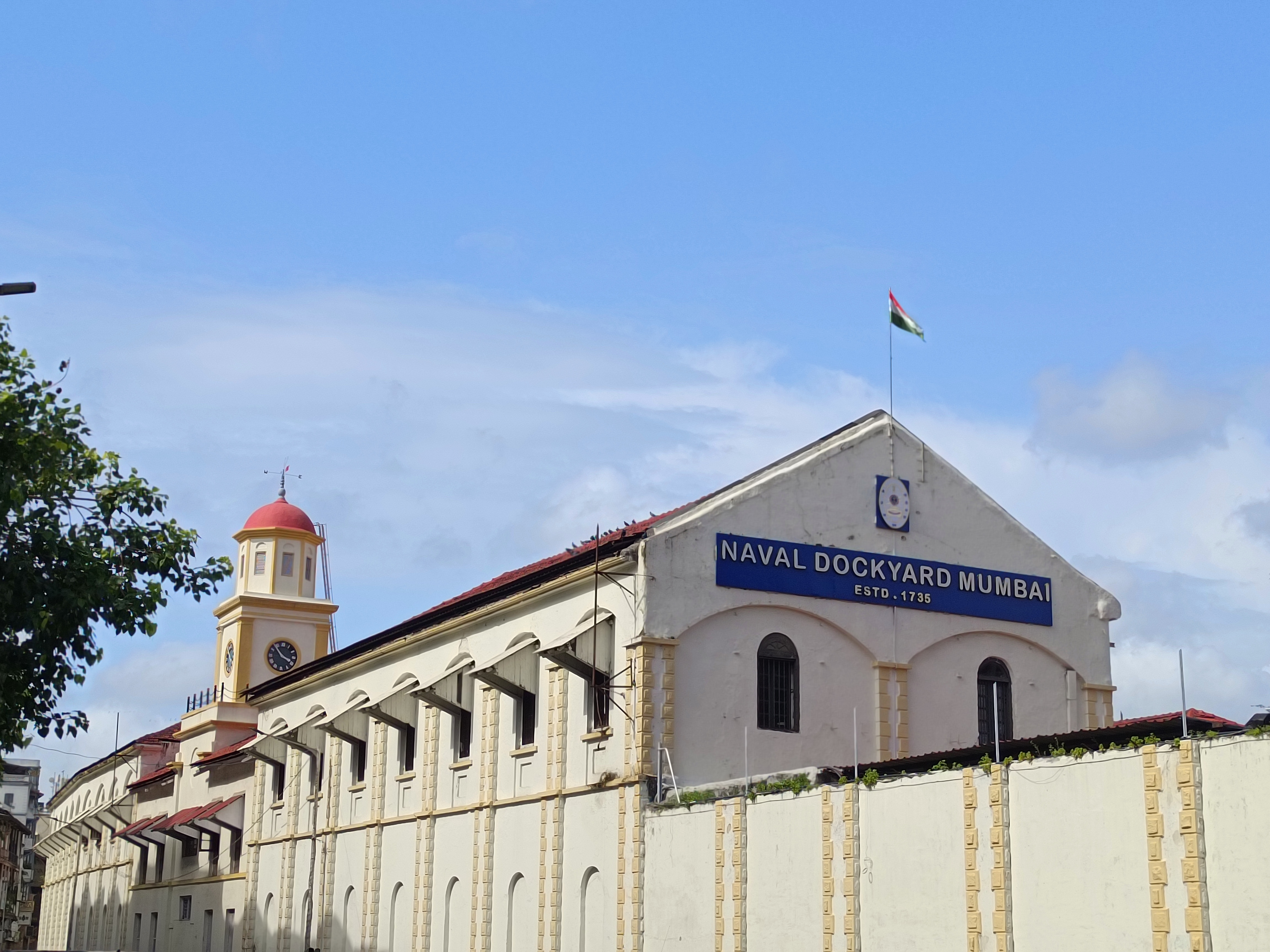

Location
- Country: India
- Location: Mumbai

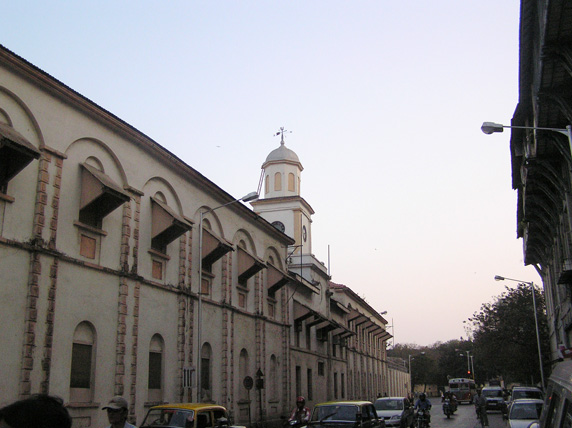
Naval dockyard, Mumbai: entry to the dockyard is restricted to naval personnel only

Naval Dockyard, Mumbai, abbreviated as ND (Mbi) and previously known as the Bombay Dockyard, is an Indian shipbuilding yard in Mumbai.

The superintendent of the dockyard is a naval officer of the rank Rear Admiral, known as the Admiral Superintendent.

== Background ==
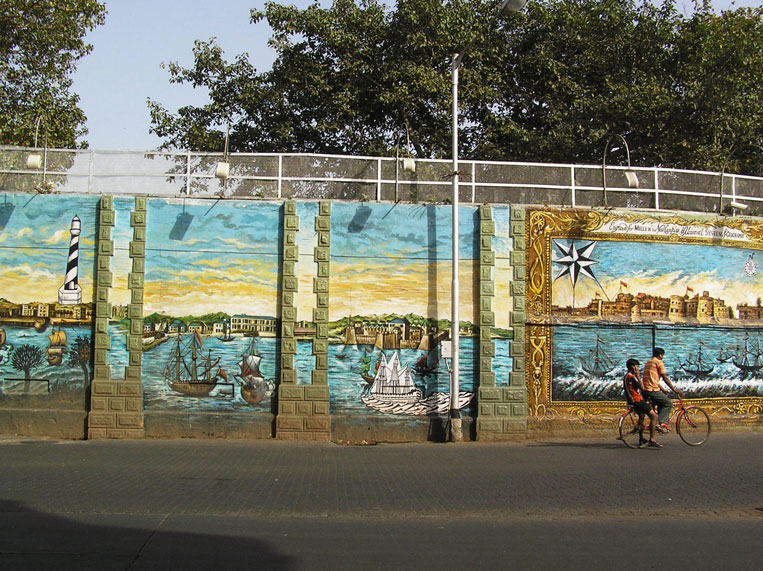
Mural on the walls of the Naval Dockyard, Mumbai

Shipbuilding was an established profession throughout the Indian coastline prior to the advent of the Europeans and it contributed significantly to maritime exploration throughout Indian maritime history. Indian rulers weakened with the advent of the European powers during the Middle Ages. Indian shipbuilders, however, continued to build ships capable of carrying 800 to 1000 tons. The shipbuilders built ships like HMS Hindostan and HMS Ceylon, inducted into the Royal Navy. Other historical ships made by the Indian shipbuilders included HMS Asia (commanded by Edward Codrington during the Battle of Navarino in 1827), HMS Cornwallis (on board which the Treaty of Nanking was signed in 1842), and HMS Minden (on which Francis Scott Key wrote the poem "The Defence of Fort McHenry", later to become the lyrics to "The Star-Spangled Banner").

== History ==
The Yard was established in 1735 by the East India Company, which brought in shipwrights from their base at Surat in order to construct vessels using Malabar teak. One of their number, Lovji Nusserwanjee Wadia, was (along with several generations of his descendants) a key figure in the success of the Yard, as indicated in The New Cambridge History of India: Science, Technology and Medicine in Colonial India:

Between the seventeenth and early nineteenth centuries Indian shipyards produced a series of vessels incorporating these hybrid features. A large proportion of them were built in Bombay, where the Company had established a small shipyard. In 1736 Parsi carpenters were brought in from Surat to work there and, when their European supervisor died, one of the carpenters, Lowji Nuserwanji Wadia, was appointed Master Builder in his place. Wadia oversaw the construction of thirty-five ships, twenty-one of them for the Company. Following his death in 1774, his sons took charge of the shipyard and between them built a further thirty ships over the next sixteen years. The Britannia, a ship of 749 tons launched in 1778, so impressed the Court of Directors when it reached Britain that several new ships were commissioned from Bombay, some of which later passed into the hands of the Royal Navy. In all, between 1736 and 1821, 159 ships of over 100 tons were built at Bombay, including 15 of over 1,000 tons. Ships constructed at Bombay in its heyday were said to be ‘vastly superior to anything built anywhere else in the world’.

Lowji Wadia oversaw the building of Bombay Dock, Asia's first dry dock, in 1750; it is still in use today. A contemporary British traveller, Abraham Parsons, described it as follows in 1775:

Here is a dock-yard, large and well contrived, with all kind of naval stores deposited in proper warehouses, together with great quantities of timber and planks for repairing and building ships, and forges for making of anchors, as well as every kind of smaller smiths’ work. It boasts such a dry dock, as, perhaps, is not to be seen in any part of Europe, either for size or convenient situation. It has three divisions, and three pair of strong gates, so as to be capable of receiving and repairing three ships of the line, at the same or at separate times; as the outermost ship can warp out, and another be admitted in her place every spring tide, without any interruption of the work doing to the second and innermost ships; or both the outermost and the second ship can go out, and two others be received in their places, without hindrance to the workmen employed on the third or innermost ship. Near the dock is a convenient place to grave several ships at once, which is done as well, and with as great expedition, as in any dock in England. Near the dock-yard is a rope walk, which for length, situation, and conveniency, equals any in England, that in the king’s yard at Portsmouth only excepted, and, like that, it has a covering to shelter the workmen from the inclemency of the weather in all seasons. Here are made cables and all sorts of lesser cordage, both for the royal navy, the company’s marine, and the merchant, ships which trade to these parts of India. Besides cordage made of hemp, cables, hawsers, and all kinds of smaller ropes, are made of the external fibres of the cocoa-nut, which they have in such abundance in India, as to make a great article of trade among the natives of this place and those along the coasts, between Bombay and Cape Comorin. The yarn made of these fibres is mostly manufactured in the towns and villages, on or near the sea coast of Malabar: many vessels belonging to the natives are laden entirely with this yarn, which they always find a quick sale for at Bombay and Surat, let the quantity be ever so great, as it is the only cordage made use of amongst the small trading vessels of the country: large ships use much of it, made into cables, hawsers, and smaller ropes; it is called kyah. Ships built at Bombay are not only as strong, but as handsome, are as well finished as ships built in any part of Europe; the timber and plank, of which they are built, so far exceeds any in Europe for durability that it is usual for ships to last fifty or sixty years; as a proof of which I am informed, that the ship called the Bombay grab, of twenty-four guns, (the second in size belonging to the Company’s marine) has been built more than sixty years, and is now a good and strong ship. This timber and plank arc peculiar to India only; the best on this side of India grows to the north of Bombay; what grows to the south, on the coast of. Malabar, is, however, very good, and great quantities of it are, brought to Bombay; it is called tiek, and will last in a-hot climate longer than any wood whatever.

In 1811 the British Royal Navy took over the Yard, continuing to work with the Wadia family as Master Shipwrights. There was much construction on the site around this time. Duncan Dock, which was the largest dry dock outside Europe at the time, was constructed in 1807–1810, and remains in use today. The main Dockyard building, which fronts onto Shahid Bhagat Singh Road, dates from 1807, as does the administration block. The nearby Great Western Building (formerly Admiralty House) had housed the Port Admiral from around 1764–1792.

Today the Yard serves as the premier repair yard of the Indian Navy. It employs 10,000 workers (mostly civilians) overseen by an Admiral Superintendent.

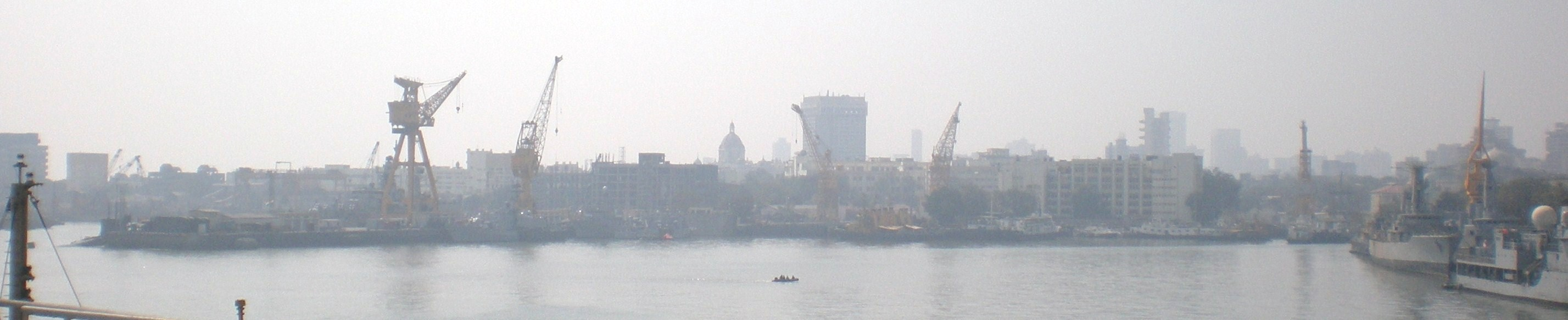
View of the dockyard from the sea

== Notes ==
- Arnold, David (2004), The New Cambridge History of India: Science, Technology and Medicine in Colonial India, Cambridge University Press, ISBN 0-521-56319-4.
