= Anti-Submarine Warfare Shallow Water Craft =

Class of ships of the Indian Navy

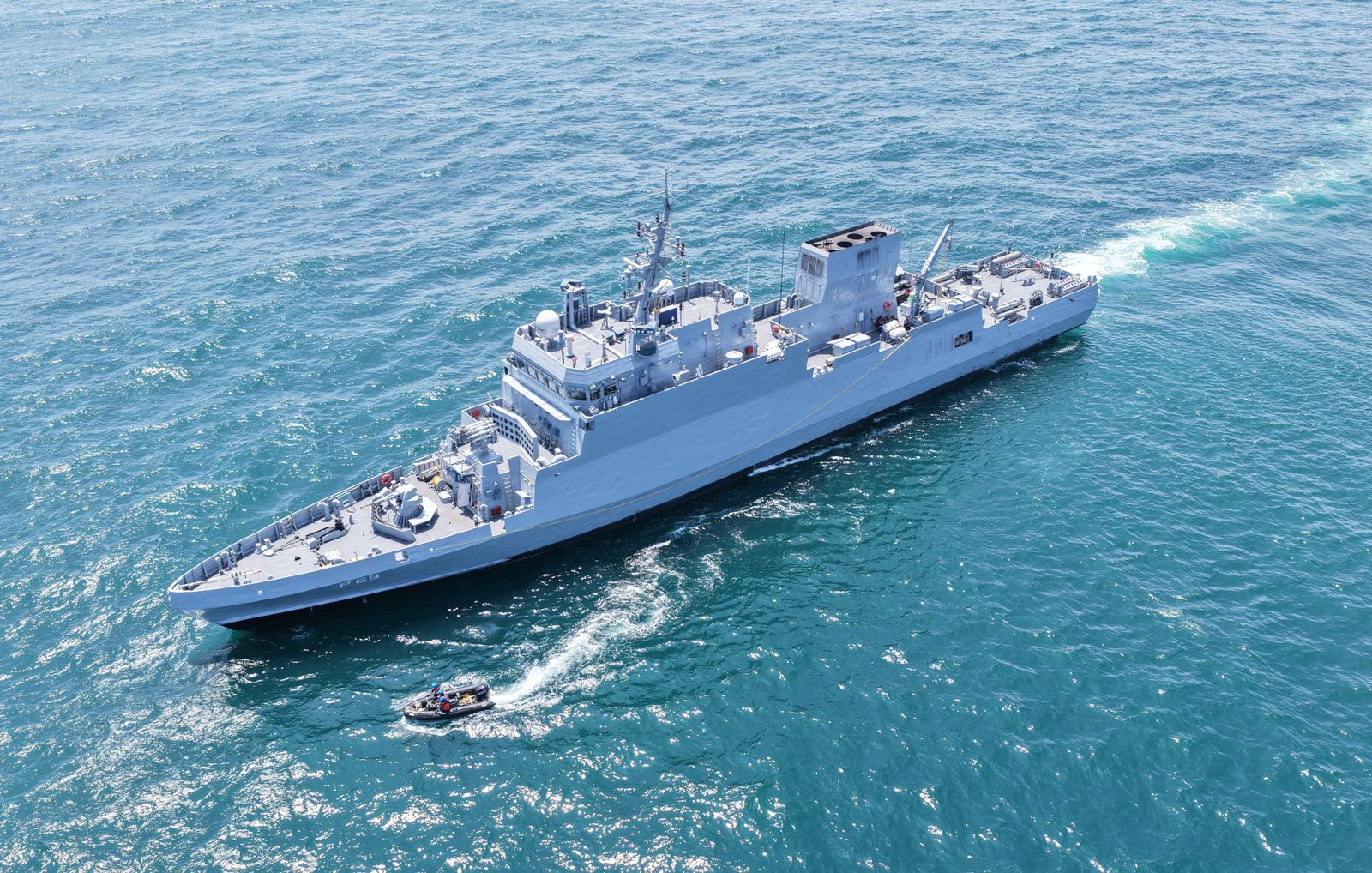
- INS Androth at sea

Class overview
- Name: Anti-Submarine Warfare Shallow Water Craft (ASW-SWC)
- Builders: Cochin Shipyard (CSL); Garden Reach Shipbuilders & Engineers (GRSE) (in partnership with Kattupalli Shipyard of L&T)
- Operators: Indian Navy
- Preceded by: Kamorta class by antecedence; Abhay class by role
- Succeeded by: Next Generation Missile Vessels
- Cost: ₹12,622 crore (equivalent to ₹160 billion or US$1.7 billion in 2026) for 16 ships (FY 2020); ₹789 crore (equivalent to ₹10 billion or US$110 million in 2026) per ship (FY 2020)
- Built: 2020 – present
- In commission: 2025 – present
- Planned: 16
- Building: 8
- Completed: 8
- Active: 7

General characteristics
- Type: Corvette
- Tonnage: 1,490 t (1,470 long tons) GT (Arnala class)
- Displacement: 900 tons (Arnala class); 896—1,100 tons (Mahe class)
- Length: 77.6 m (255 ft) (Arnala class); 78 m (256 ft) (Mahe class)
- Beam: 10.5 m (34 ft) (Arnala class); 11.36 m (37.3 ft) (Mahe class)
- Draught: 2.7 m (8.9 ft) (Arnala class)
- Propulsion: 3 × MTU 20V 4000 M93L (Arnala class); 3 × L&T Water-jet propulsion
- Speed: 25 knots (46 km/h)
- Range: 1,800 nautical miles (3,300 km) (at 14 knots (26 km/h)
- Complement: 57 (7 officers + 50 sailors)
- Sensors & processing systems: Combat Suite: ASW Combat Suite (presumably the DRDO-developed IAC MOD 'C' combat suite); Sonar: DRDO Abhay Hull-Mounted Sonar (HMS); Low Frequency Variable Depth Sonar (LFVDS); Other Sensors: 1 × Expandable Bathythermograph; 2 × Navigation Radars; Management Systems: Fire Control System (FCS); Integrated Platform Management System (IPMS); Automatic Power Management System (APMS); Battle Damage Control System (BDCS)
- Armament: Anti-Submarine Warfare: 1 × RBU-6000 anti-submarine rocket launcher; 2 × triple lightweight torpedo launchers (presumably the Advanced Light Weight Torpedo (ALWT)); Anti-submarine mines (launched from mine-laying rails); Guns: 1 × Naval Surface Gun (30mm); 2 × OFT 12.7 mm M2 Stabilized Remote Controlled Gun
- Notes: Largest waterjet-powered vessels in the Indian Navy.

The Anti-Submarine Warfare Shallow Water Crafts (ASW-SWC) is a small surface vessel type designed for anti-submarine warfare in littoral waters. There are two ship classes of the type in operation with the Indian Navy: eight Arnala class for the Eastern Fleet and eight Mahe class for the Western Fleet being built by the Garden Reach Shipbuilders & Engineers (GRSE) and the Cochin Shipyard Limited (CSL), respectively.

They were conceived as a replacement to the ageing Abhay-class corvettes of the Indian Navy, and are designed to undertake low-intensity maritime operations (LIMO) in littoral zones — including subsurface surveillance and interdiction, search-and-attack unit (SAU) missions and coordinated anti-submarine warfare (ASW) operations with naval aircraft. They were also designed to provide secondary duties — including minelaying and search-and-rescue (SAR). The corvettes are meant for operations within a range of 200 nmi (370 km; 230 mi) from the coastline. The final hull of the 16-ship project is expected to be delivered by June 2028.

== History ==
=== Background ===
In December 2013, the Defence Acquisition Council (DAC) –- the main acquisition panel subordinate to India's Ministry of Defence (MoD), approved the procurement of sixteen anti-submarine warfare (ASW) vessels capable of operating in shallow waters, at a cost of ₹13,440 crore (equivalent to ₹250 billion or US$2.7 billion in 2026), to replace the ageing Abhay-class corvettes of the Indian Navy – which were commissioned between 1989 and 1991.

In June 2014, the MoD issued a tender, worth USD2.25 billion under the 'Buy and Make India' category to private-shipyards – including Larsen & Toubro (L&T), ABG Shipyard, Pipavav Defense and Offshore Engineering, Goa Shipyard (GSL) and Garden Reach Shipbuilders & Engineers (GRSE), for the procurement of the 16 anti-submarine vessels.

In October 2017, Cochin Shipyard (CSL) and Garden Reach Shipbuilders & Engineers (GRSE) emerged as the first and the second-lowest bidder in the tender, respectively.

=== Purchase ===
On 29 April 2019, the MoD and GRSE signed a contract valued at ₹6,311 crore (equivalent to ₹86 billion or US$910 million in 2026) for eight anti-submarine vessels, to be delivered between 2022 and 2026. The contract stipulated that the first vessel had to be delivered within 42 months of the date of signing, with the remaining seven vessels delivered at regular intervals.

On 30 April 2019, the MoD and CSL signed a similar contract, valued at ₹6,311 crore (equivalent to ₹86 billion or US$910 million in 2026) for the construction of the remaining eight vessels – within a deadline of 84 months. Under this contract, the first ship was also expected to be delivered within a span of 42 months, with subsequent deliveries of two ships per year.

=== Construction ===
==== Arnala class ====
GRSE outsourced a part of the construction of four of the corvettes to Kattupalli Shipyard of L&T Shipbuilding under a public–private partnership after receiving the contract. A similar arrangement was undertaken for the Survey Vessel (Large) project. L&T Shipbuilding was identified as a partner following a "structured commercial process" under GRSE's build strategy to combine the "technical competence" and experience of GRSE with the "operational flexibility" of L&T. Under the subcontract, GRSE retained responsibility for design, procurement, production planning and quality management whereas L&T carried out construction-related job.

GRSE has adopted integrated construction methods for the corvettes. Every ship is an assembly of 19 hull blocks built at multiple locations across the two shipyards. For example, after a keel is laid, two other "lower-hull blocks" are integrated with the M1 main machinery keel block. The corvettes were built using 3,500 tonnes of special-grade steel supplied by SAIL from its steel plants in Bokaro, Bhilai and Rourkela.

On 31 December 2020, GRSE initiated the construction of the stipulated vessels under its agreement with the steel-cutting ceremony of the first of the eight vessels at the Kattupalli Shipyard, near Chennai. The production timeline had been delayed by four months due to the COVID-19 pandemic. According to the stipulated timeline, the vessels had to be between October 2022 and October 2026 at a rate of two ships every year.

GRSE initiated the construction of two more vessels under its contract, with their respective steel-cutting ceremonies on 14 July 2021, while the keel of the first vessel was laid on 6 August 2021.

On 21 December 2021, GRSE laid the keel of the first vessel to be constructed in its own shipyard. GRSE had originally planned to build five of the ships with an option for another one in L&T Shipyard. However, the number of in-house built ships were later increased to four of eight vessels.

The keels for the second and third vessel from Kattupalli was laid on 17 June 2022.

By March 2025, the Contractor Sea Trials (CST) of INS Arnala, the first ship from L&T Shipyard, and INS Androth, the first ship from GRSE Shipyard, was completed by GRSE along with INS Himgiri. As per a press release, "CST is considered the final stage of construction, when a vessel’s seaworthiness is tested". The release also stated that Arnala was to be delivered to the Navy soon.

INS Arnala was delivered to the Indian Navy on 8 May 2025 at Kattupalli Shipyard. The ship, named after Arnala fort, was to commissioned on 18 June 2025.

The last warship of the class, Ajay, was launched on 21 July 2025 by Priya Deshmukh, wife of Vice Admiral Kiran Deshmukh, Indian Navy's Chief of Materiel. The second ship of the class, Androth, was delivered on 13 September 2025, and commissioned on 6 October 2025 in Visakhapatnam.

The third ship from GRSE lot, Anjadip, was delivered to the Indian Navy on 22 December 2025 and was commissioned on 27 February 2026.

The fourth ship from this class, Agray, was laid down on 31 December 2022, and launched on 13 March 2024. The ship was delivered to the Indian Navy on 30 March 2026 along with INS Dunagiri and INS Sanshodhak. The three ships were commissioned simultaneously during a tri-commissioning event on 21 June 2026 in Kolkata.

==== Mahe class ====
On 1 December 2020, CSL initiated the project's construction with the steel cutting of the first vessel, Mahe (BY 523) at Kochi. Thereafter, the steel cutting for the fourth and fifth vessels, and six and seventh vessels of the series was conducted on 1 December 2021 and 30 August 2022, respectively.

The deliveries of eight vessels from CSL were expected between August 2025 and June 2028.

The first three ships of the class — Mahe, Malwan and Mangrol — were commissioned on 24 November 2025, 22 July 2026 and 12 October 2026, respectively.

== Design ==
=== General ===
The Arnala-class ships were designed entirely by the in-house design team of Garden Reach Shipbuilders and Engineers (GRSE). GRSE's design team employed virtual reality tools and Aveva Marine design software to design the hull blocks. Every ship is an assembly of 19 hull blocks built at multiple locations across two shipyards. The team also involved the Indian Navy and supply chain from the initial design stages to optimise the ergonomics, maintainability and manufacturability of the ships. The shipyard also received the Raksha Mantri Award 2022 for designing INS Arnala — "the most silent ship" of the Indian Navy. The corvettes uses special-grade steel supplied by SAIL. The class of warships are designed and developed as per the classification rules of the Indian Register of Shipping (IRS).

Meanwhile, the Mahe-class ships were developed by a collaboration of Cochin Shipyard Limited (CSL) with two other entities. The basic design of the ships have been sourced from Kakkanad-based Smart Engineering & Design Solutions (SDES) followed by detailed design by the shipyard. Additionally, Finland-based Surma provided the signature management software and design inputs for combat survivability features. The ships are being constructed as per the classification rules of Det Norske Veritas (DNV).

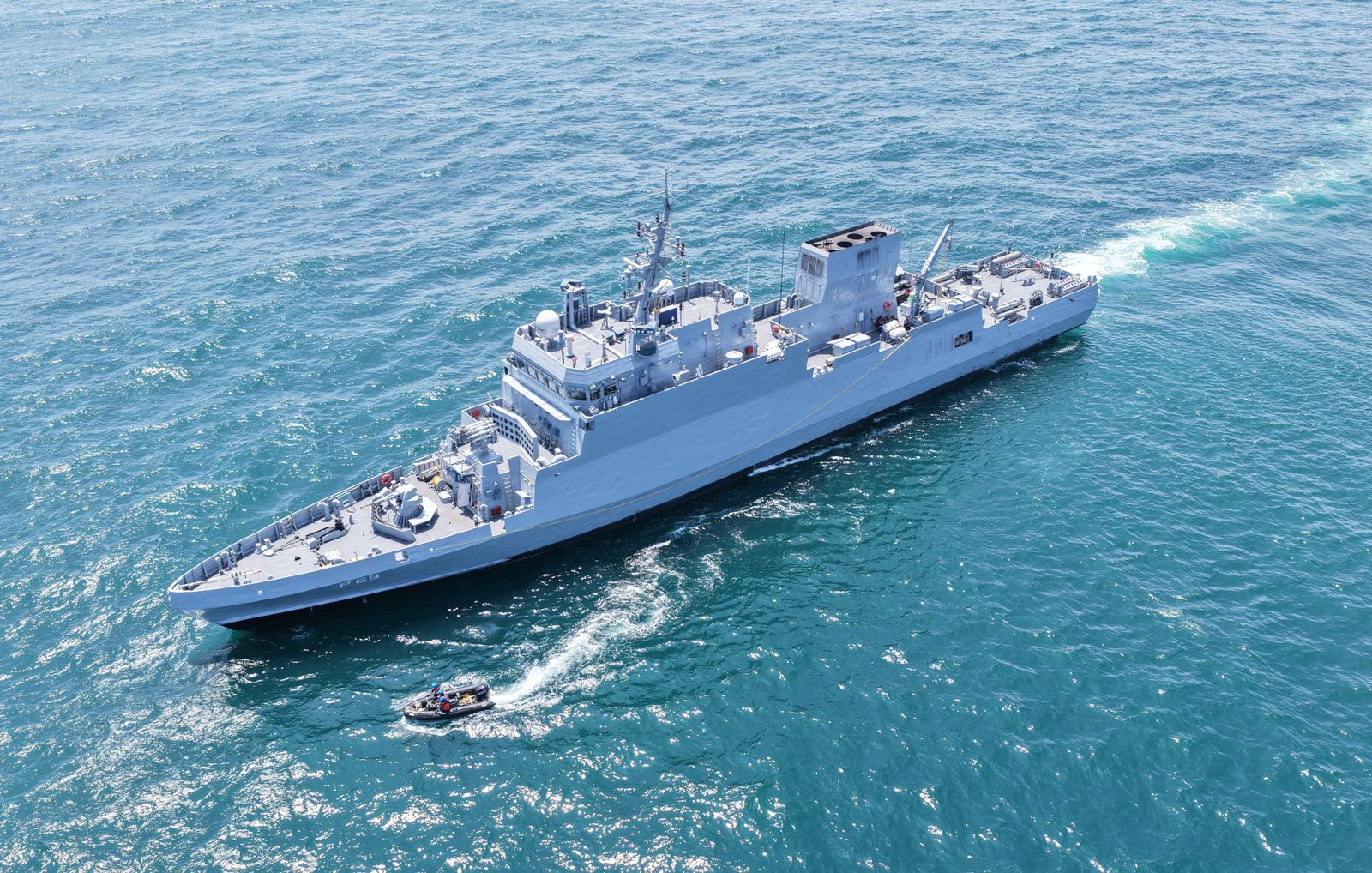
INS Androth, an Arnala-class warship designed by GRSE

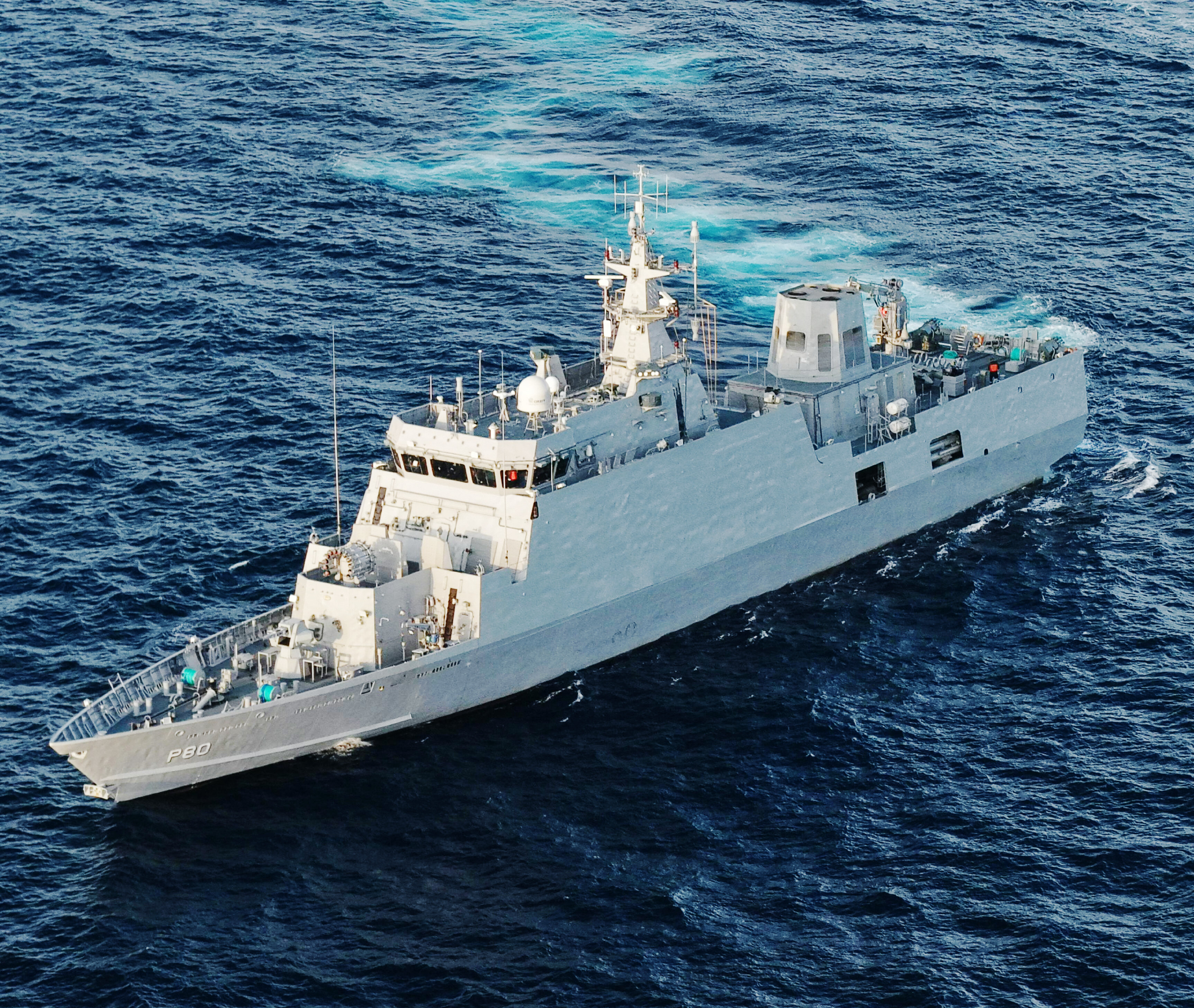
INS Mahe, a Mahe-class warship designed by CSL, SDES and Surma

While the majority of the specifications and configurations are similar, the classes mostly differ in the layout of the 30 mm gun deck, ASW rocket launcher mount and deflectors, main mast, funnel and lightweight torpedo launchers along with hoist crane and that of the equipment in the stern. Both of the ship classes have indigenous content of over 80%, with equipment and materials being sourced from Bharat Electronics, Mahindra Defence, and Larsen & Toubro among others. The Arnala class has a reported indigenous content of over 88%. The vessels are also reported to possess several features of stealth – including a reduced radar cross-section (RCS), a low acoustic signature and a low infrared signature.

=== Specifications ===
Arnala-class has a displacement of 900 tonnes with a gross tonnage of 1,490 tonnes. By dimensions, the ship measures 77.6 m (255 ft) by length and 10.5 m (34 ft) by width. Arnala offers a maximum speed of 25 kn (46 km/h; 29 mph) and a maximum range of 1,800 nmi (3,300 km) at a speed of 14 kn (26 km/h). The ships have a standard accommodation for seven officers and 50 sailors and has a provision to carry an RHIB.

Mahe-class has a displacement of 896–1,100 t (882–1,083 long tons). By dimensions, the ship measures 78 m (256 ft) by length and 11.36 m (37.3 ft) by width with a draft of 2.7 m (8 ft 10 in). The ships offers a maximum speed of 25 kn (46 km/h; 29 mph) and a maximum range of 1,800 nmi (3,300 km) at a speed of 14 kn (26 km/h) with an endurance of 14 days.

=== Propulsion ===
These classes are considered as the largest warship of the Indian Navy to be designed and propelled by waterjet technology. The warships are equipped with three marine diesel engines, developing a power output of 6 MW, coupled with a water jet each, which are connected through reversible reduction gears. The diesel engines of the Arnala class are the MTU's 20V 4000 M93L models.

=== Armament ===
The weapons suite of the ships is designed to support its intended anti-submarine warfare operations in shallow waters. The anti-submarine weapons that equip the ship includes a forward-mounted RBU-6000, a triple 324 mm lightweight torpedo tube each on port and starboard equipped with Advanced Light-Weight Torpedo (ALWT) at the aft and anti-submarine mine-laying rails. Behind the torpedo tubes, two Mahindra Defence Systems-supplied torpedo decoy launching systems (DLS), as a part of the Integrated Anti-Submarine Warfare Defence Suite (IADS).

For surface warfare and self-defence, the ship employs a 30 mm Naval Surface Gun, which serves the role of main gun as well as two OFT 12.7 mm M2 Stabilized Remote Controlled Gun (SRCG) as general-purpose machine guns. The SRCG is the Indian variant of Elbit Systems' Remote Controlled Naval Weapon Station (RCNWS).

=== Sensors ===
As part of its sensor suite, the ships are equipped with Abhay compact active hull-mounted sonar (HMS), a towed low-frequency variable-depth sonar (LFVDS) procured from a joint venture firm between Indian CFF Fluid Control Ltd. and German Atlas Elektronik, a division of ThyssenKrupp Marine Systems (TKMS) along with an underwater acoustic communication system (UWACS).

The Abhay active sonar system — developed by DRDO's Naval Physical and Oceanographic Laboratory (NPOL) and manufactured by Bharat Electronics Limited (BEL) — includes transducer array, data acquisition system, power amplifier and the dual multi-function console (DMFC). The system utilises advanced adaptive signal and information processing techniques to detect, track and classify targets. The compact system helps in the application of the systems onto smaller category of naval warships like Shallows Water Crafts, Light Frigates & Patrol Vessels by replacing legacy Russian sonar. Earlier, hull-mounted sonars were only limited to frigates and destroyers.

Additionally, the Arnala-class corvettes are equipped with two navigation radars, an electronic warfare suite which employs Radar Electronic Support Measures (R-ESM) and Communications ESM (C-ESM) or COMINT and is equipped for Satellite Communications (SATCOM). As part of its network-centric warfare suite, the entire sensors and weapon suite is integrated into the combat management system (CMS) and the ship is equipped with integrated bridge system (IBS), an expandable bathy theromograph (XBT), an automatic identification system (AIS), an echo sounder and an automatic weather observation system (AWOS). The ship employs an Integrated ASW Complex (IAC) MOD ‘C’ Systems which computes fire control solutions and facilitates firing of ASW weapons including torpedoes and rockets. The IAC was developed by DRDO and is produced by BEL.

The ships are also equipped with Electronic Support Measures (ESM), Electronics Intelligence (ELINT) and a combat management system.

== Ships of the class ==
Name	Penn.	Yard	Builder	Steel-cutting	Laid down	Launched	Delivered	Commissioned	Homeport	Status
Arnala-class
Arnala	P68	3029	L&T	31 December 2020	6 August 2021	20 December 2022	8 May 2025	18 June 2025	Visakhapatnam	Active
Anjadip	P73	3030	L&T	14 July 2021	17 June 2022	13 June 2023	22 December 2025	27 February 2026	Chennai	Active
Amini	P75	3031	L&T	14 July 2021	17 June 2022	16 November 2023	5 November 2026			Delivered
Abhay		3032	L&T	—N/a	13 June 2023	25 October 2024				Launched
Agray	P36	3033	GRSE	—N/a	31 December 2022	13 March 2024	30 March 2026	21 June 2026		Active
Ajay	P34	3034	GRSE	—N/a	10 May 2024	21 July 2025				Launched
Androth	P69	3035	GRSE	—N/a	21 December 2021	21 March 2023	13 September 2025	6 October 2025	Visakhapatnam	Active
Akshay	P35	3036	GRSE	—N/a	31 December 2022	13 March 2024				Launched
Mahe-class
Mahe	P80	523	CSL	1 December 2020	30 August 2022	30 November 2023	23 October 2025	24 November 2025	Mumbai	Active
Malwan	P81	524	CSL	—N/a	21 February 2023	30 November 2023	31 March 2026	22 July 2026	Karwar	Active
Mangrol	P82	525	CSL	—N/a	21 February 2023	30 November 2023	21 August 2026	12 October 2026	Mumbai	Active
Malpe	P83	526	CSL	1 December 2021	8 December 2023	9 September 2024				Launched
Mulki	P84	527	CSL	1 December 2021	8 December 2023	9 September 2024				Launched
Magdala	P85	528	CSL	30 August 2022	16 December 2024	18 October 2025				Launched
Machilipatnam	P86	529	CSL	30 August 2022	29 January 2025	29 July 2026				Launched
	P87	530	CSL	—N/a	29 May 2025		June 2028			Under Construction

either scheduled or estimated dates

== Gallery ==
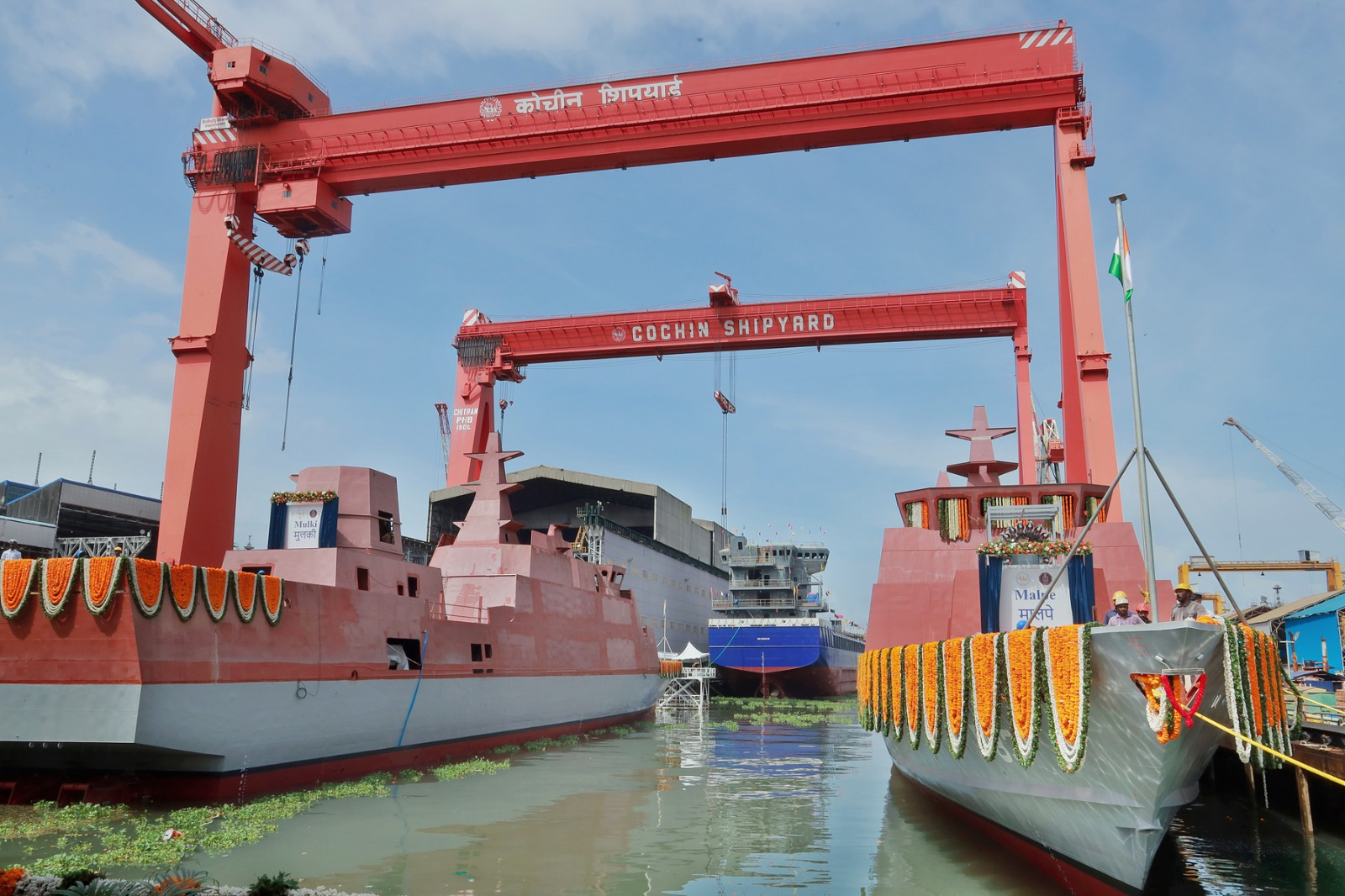
INS Mulki and INS Malpe launched

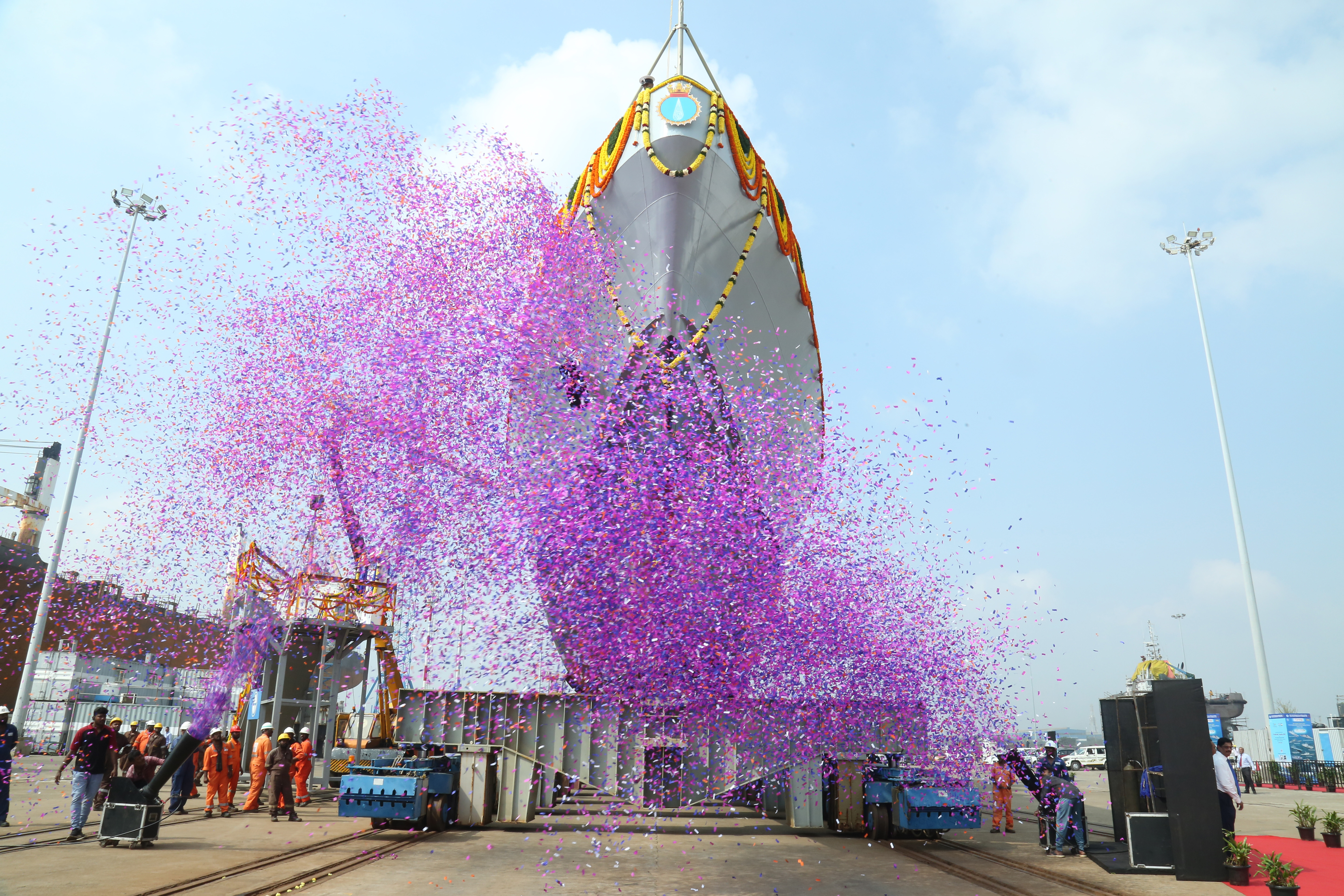
INS Arnala launch

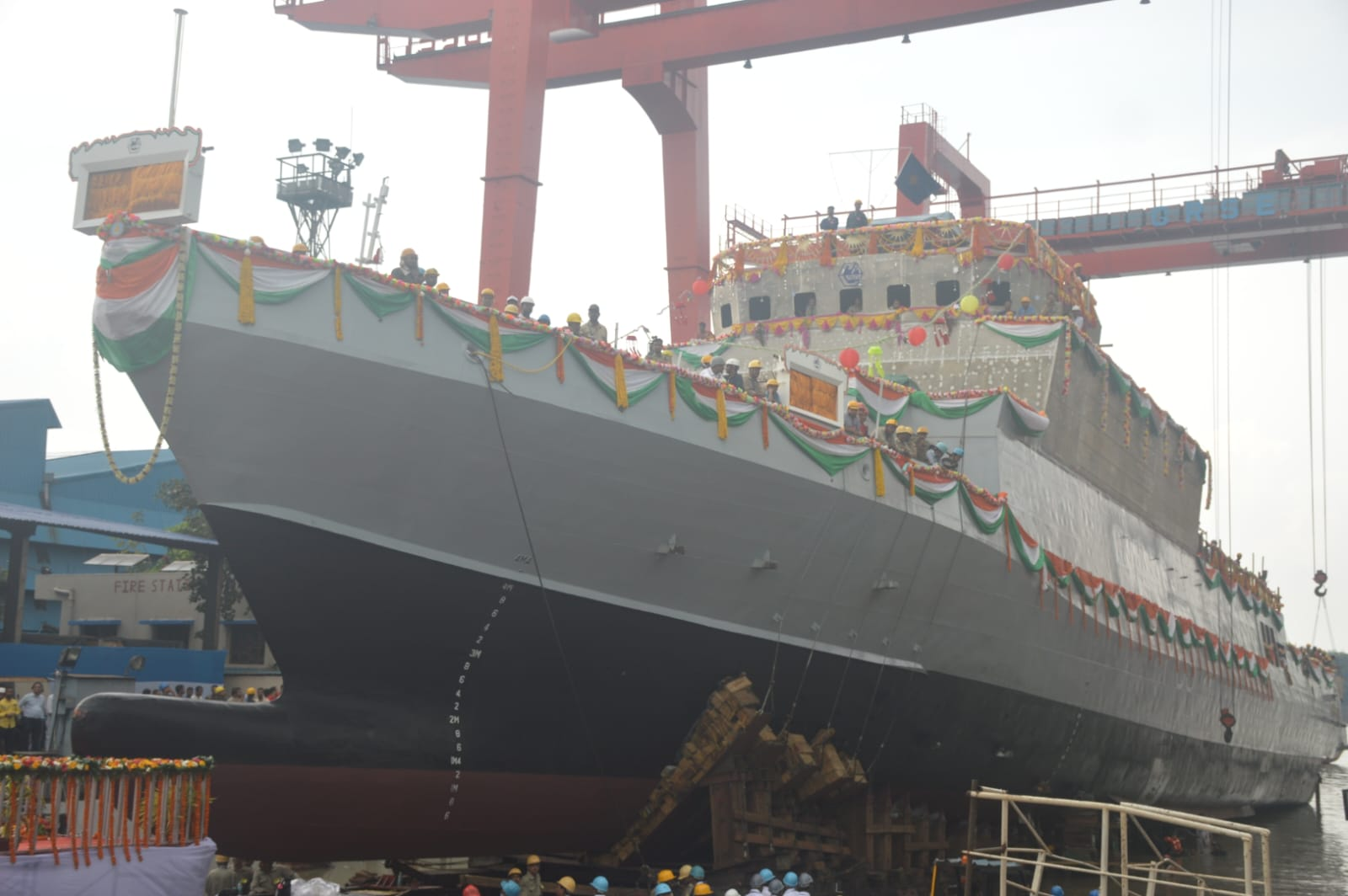
INS Androth launch

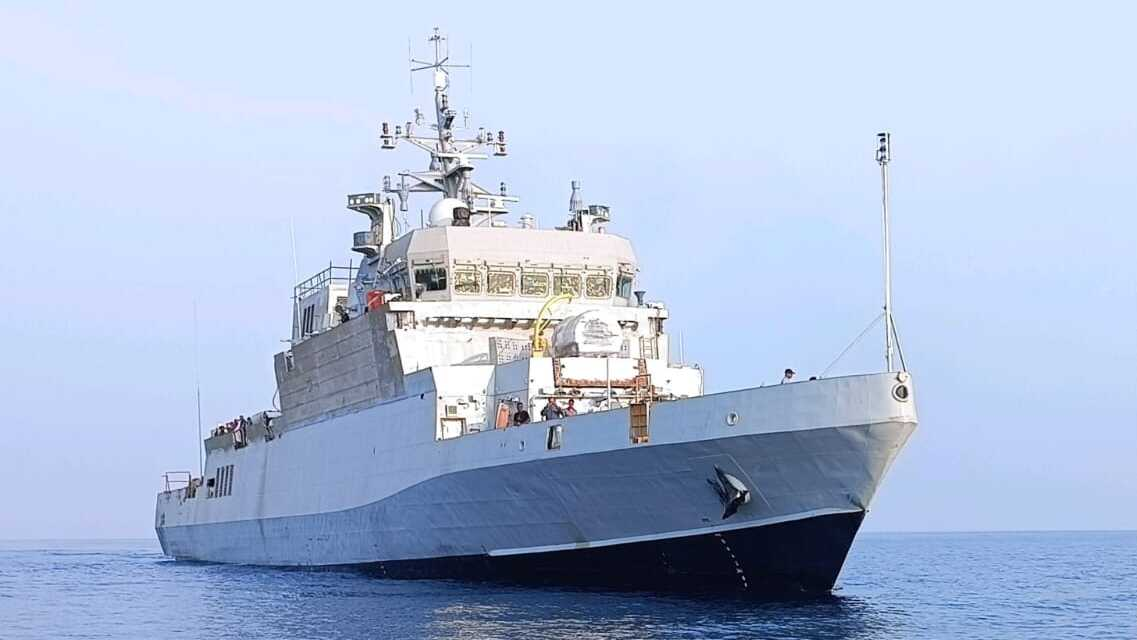
Androth during contractor trials.

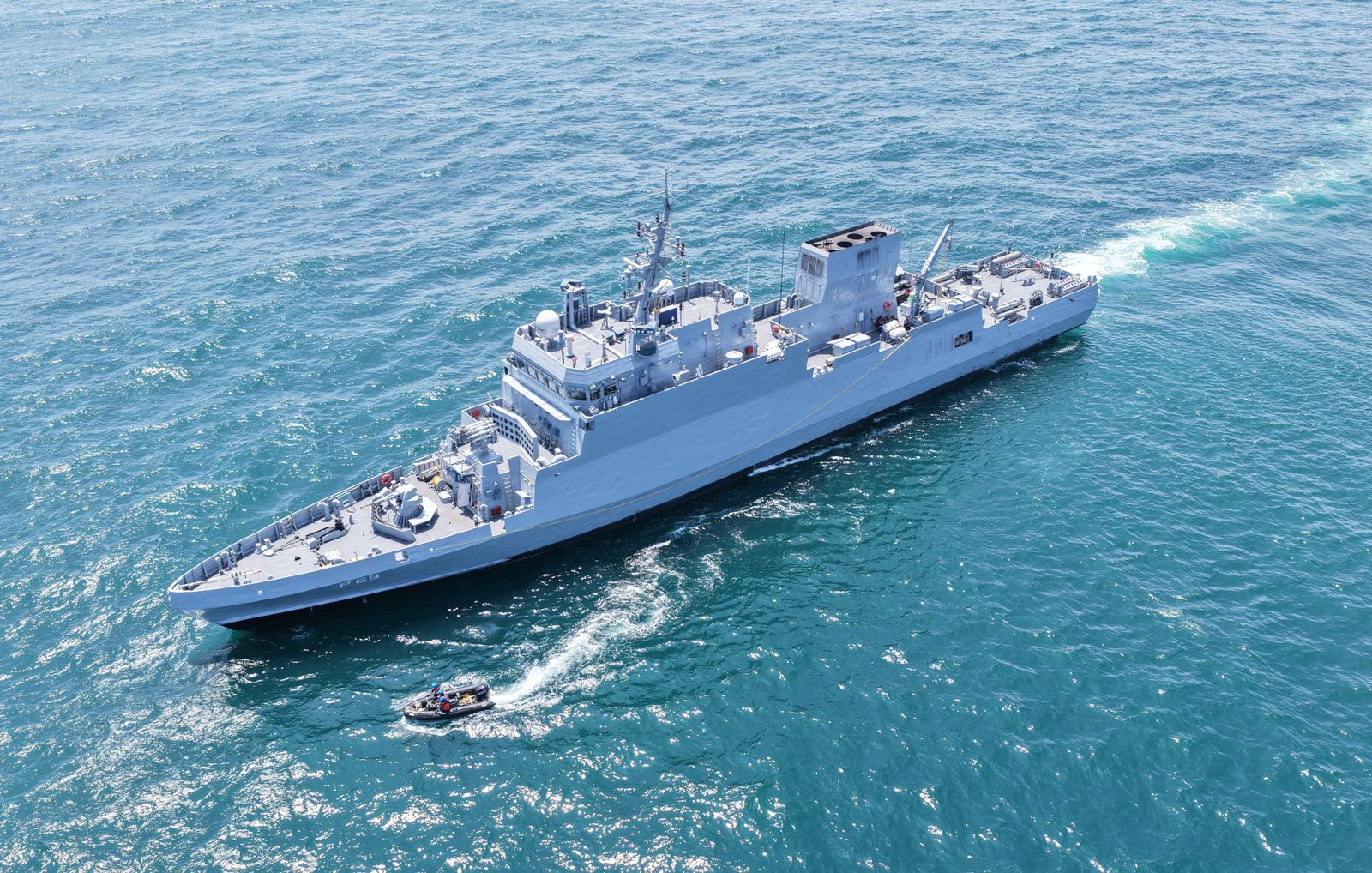
INS Andoth During sea trials

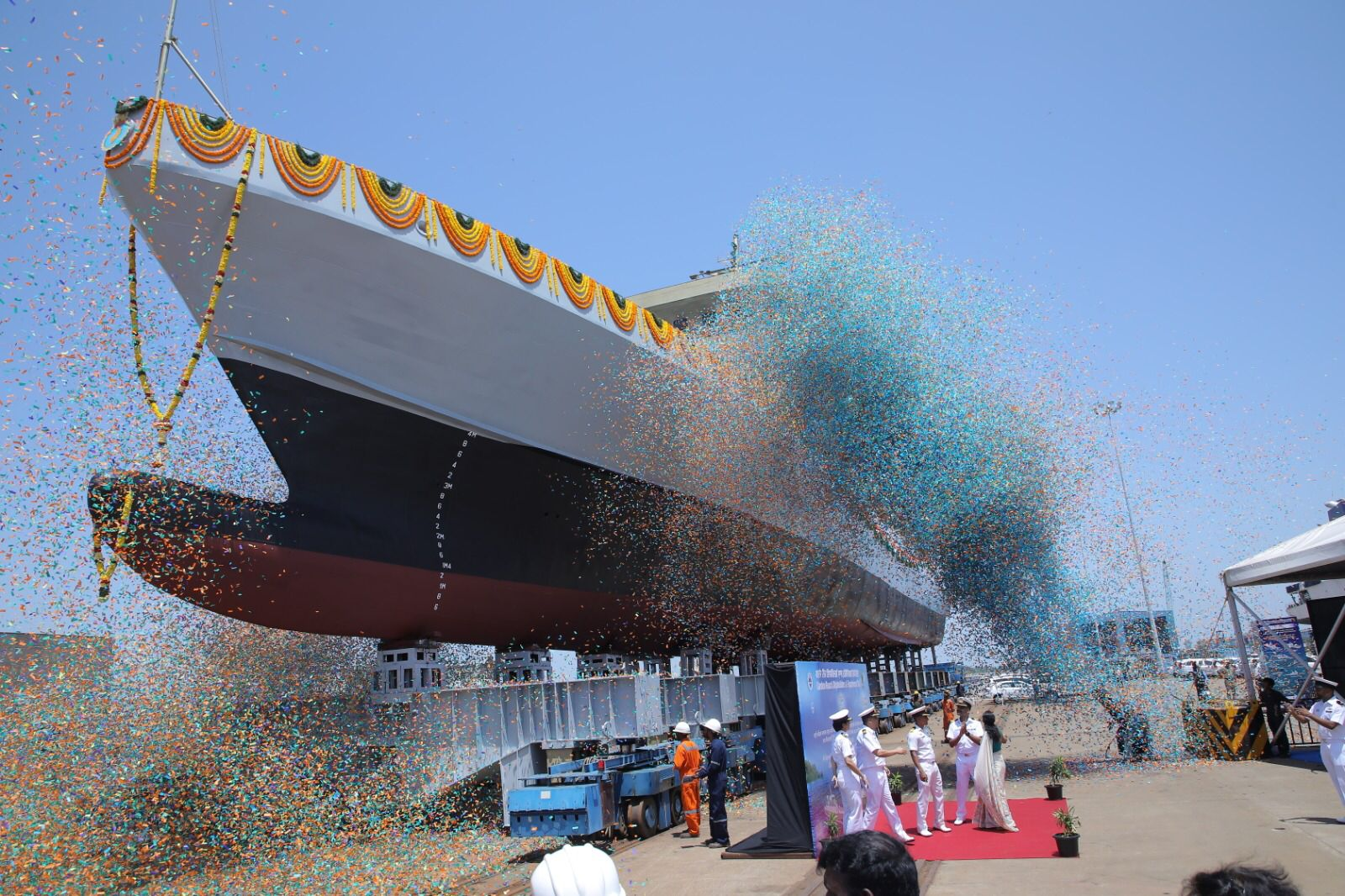
INS Anjadip Launched

== See also ==
- Indian Navy
- Future of the Indian Navy
- List of active Indian Navy ships
