= INS Androth =

INS Androth (P69) may refer to the following vessels of the Indian Navy:

- INS Androth (1972), an Arnala-class corvette commissioned in 1972 and decommissioned in 1999
- INS Androth (2023), launched in 2023
