= INS Androth (2023) =

Second ship of Arnala class corvettes of ASW-SWC project of the Indian Navy

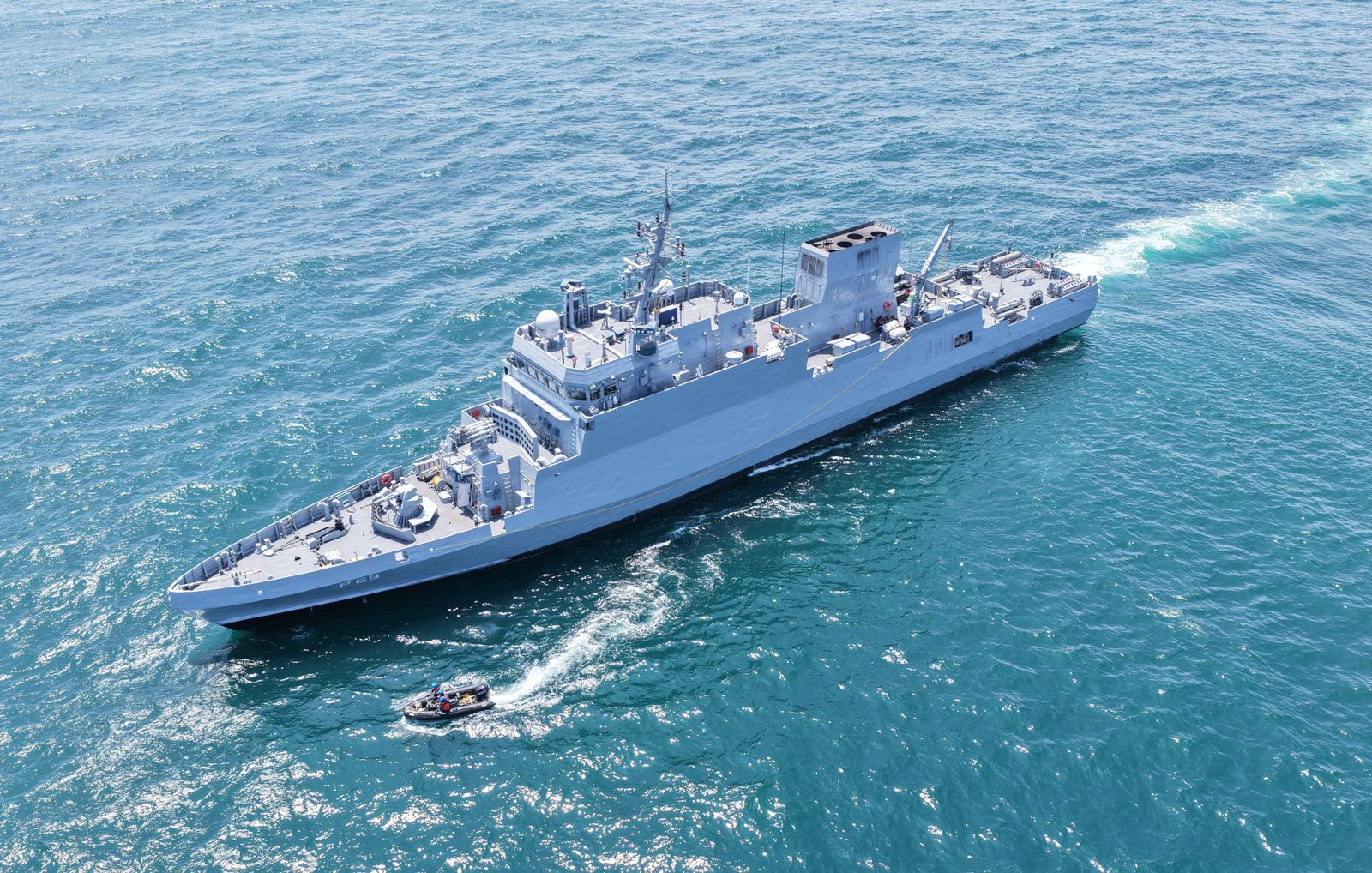
- Androth during sea trials

History

India
- Name: INS Androth
- Namesake: Androth Island
- Owner: Indian Navy
- Operator: Indian Navy
- Ordered: 29 April 2019
- Builder: Garden Reach Shipbuilders & Engineers (GRSE)
- Cost: ₹789 crore (US$84 million) (FY2020)
- Yard number: 3035
- Laid down: 21 December 2021
- Launched: 21 March 2023
- Acquired: 13 September 2025
- Commissioned: 6 October 2025
- Identification: Pennant number: P69
- Status: Active

General characteristics
- Type: Anti-Submarine Warfare Shallow Water Craft
- Tonnage: 1,490 t (1,470 long tons) GT
- Displacement: 900 t (890 long tons)
- Length: 77.6 m (254 ft 7 in)
- Beam: 10.5 m (34 ft 5 in)
- Draft: 2.7 m (8 ft 10 in)
- Propulsion: 3 × MTU 20V 4000 M93L diesel engines; 3 × water-jet propulsion; Reversible reduction gears
- Speed: 25 knots (46 km/h; 29 mph)
- Range: 1,800 nmi (3,300 km; 2,100 mi) at 14 knots (26 km/h; 16 mph)
- Boats & landing craft carried: 1 x RHIB
- Crew: 57 (7 officers + 50 sailors)
- Sensors & processing systems: Combat suite: DRDO–BEL Integrated ASW Complex (IAC) MOD ‘C’ combat suite; Sonar: DRDO Abhay Hull-Mounted Sonar (HMS); Low Frequency Variable Depth Sonar (LFVDS); Underwater Acoustic Communication System (UWACS); Management systems: Integrated Platform Management System (IPMS); Automatic Power Management System (APMS); Battle Damage Control System (BDCS)
- Electronic warfare & decoys: Electronic warfare suite: Radar Electronic Support Measures; Communications Electronic Support Measures; Decoys: 2 × 6-barrel torpedo-countermeasure system
- Armament: Anti-submarine warfare: 1 × RBU-6000 anti-submarine rocket launcher; 2 × triple lightweight torpedo launchers (Advanced Light-Weight Torpedo (ALWT)); Anti-submarine mines (launched from mine-laying rails); Guns: 1 × Naval Surface Gun (30 mm); 2 × OFT 12.7 mm M2 Stabilized Remote Controlled Gun

INS Androth is the second ship of the Arnala class of the Anti-Submarine Warfare Shallow Water Craft (ASW SWC) of the Indian Navy. The ship was commissioned on 6 October 2025.

== Design ==
The ship was designed as a shallow-water anti-submarine corvette to undertake littoral operations such as subsurface surveillance and interdiction, search-and-attack unit missions, low-intensity maritime operations and coordinated anti-submarine warfare operations with naval aircraft, with minelaying and search-and-rescue as secondary duties. The corvette was developed by GRSE's in-house design team using virtual reality tools and Aveva Marine design software. The ASW SWC ships are the Indian Navy's largest warships to be propelled by waterjets. The Arnala class are described as the Navy's quietest ships, and GRSE received the Raksha Mantri's Award in 2022 for designing them.

The anti-submarine armaments consist of an RBU-6000, two triple 324 mm torpedo launchers and minelaying rails. The ship employs a 30 mm Naval Surface Gun as the main gun, and two OFT 12.7 mm M2 Stabilized Remote Controlled Gun for surface warfare and self-defence. The ship has a network-centric warfare suite which includes the Abhay compact active hull-mounted sonar, a towed low-frequency variable-depth sonar, two navigation radars, an electronic warfare suite and SATCOM. The DRDO-developed Abhay active sonar system uses adaptive signal and information processing to detect, track and classify targets.

== Construction ==
On 29 April 2019, the MoD and GRSE signed a contract, valued at ₹6,311.32 crore (equivalent to ₹86 billion or US$910 million in 2026), for eight anti-submarine vessels, to be delivered between 2022 and 2026. The contract mandates the first vessel to be delivered within 42 months of the date of signing, with the remaining seven vessels delivered at a rate of two ships per year within 84 months.

The keel laying ceremony of the ship was conducted on 21 December 2021 at GRSE Main Works Unit in Kolkata. Christened Androth, the ship was launched into the water of the Hooghly River on 21 March 2023. The chief guest of the event was Vice Admiral Dinesh Kumar Tripathi, the then Flag Officer Commanding-in-Chief Western Naval Command, or FOC-IN-C (West).

On 3 March 2025, the Contractor Sea Trials (CST) of INS Androth was completed by GRSE along with INS Himgiri, a Nilgiri-class frigate. As per a press release, "CST is considered the final stage of construction, when a vessel's seaworthiness is tested". The ship was delivered to the Navy on 13 September 2025.

Andorth was commissioned on 6 October 2025 in Naval Dockyard (Visakhapatnam) by the Flag Officer Commanding-in-Chief, Eastern Naval Command, Vice Admiral Rajesh Pendharkar.

=== Namesake ===
The ship, Androth, was named after her predecessor, a retired Arnala-class corvette, which itself was a subclass of Soviet-origin Petya-class frigate. The name of these ships are itself inspired by the Androth Island in the Lakshadweep archipelago and reflects the strategic and symbolic significance of the vast maritime territories of India.

== Gallery ==
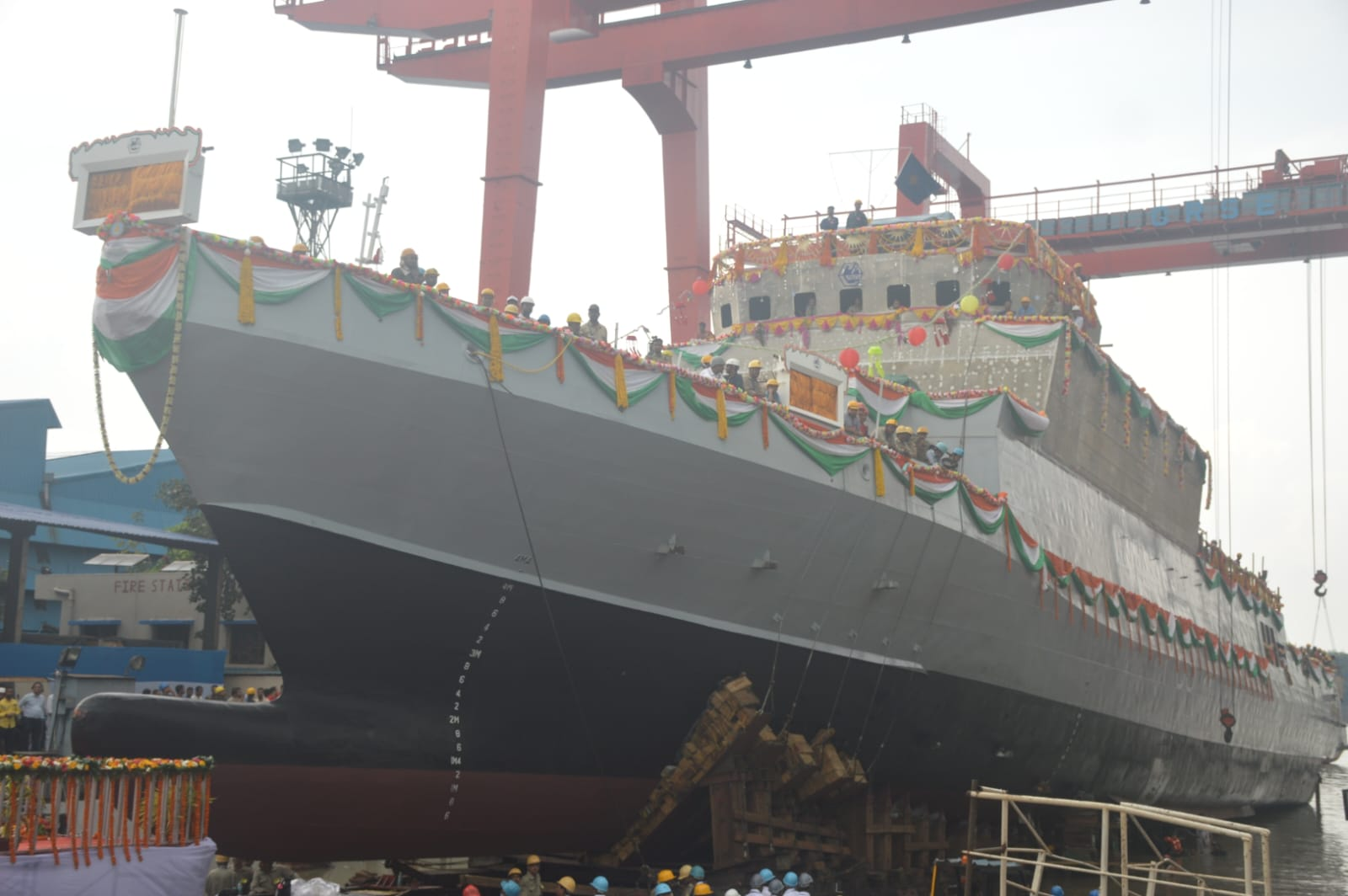
INS Androth launch

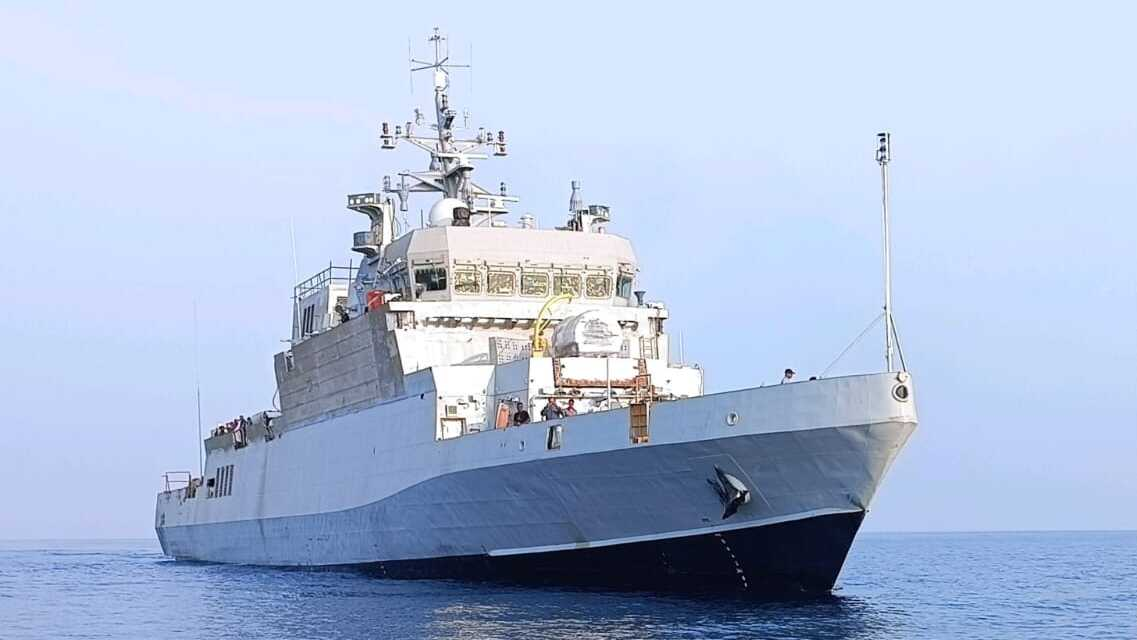
Androth after GRSE's contractor sea trials

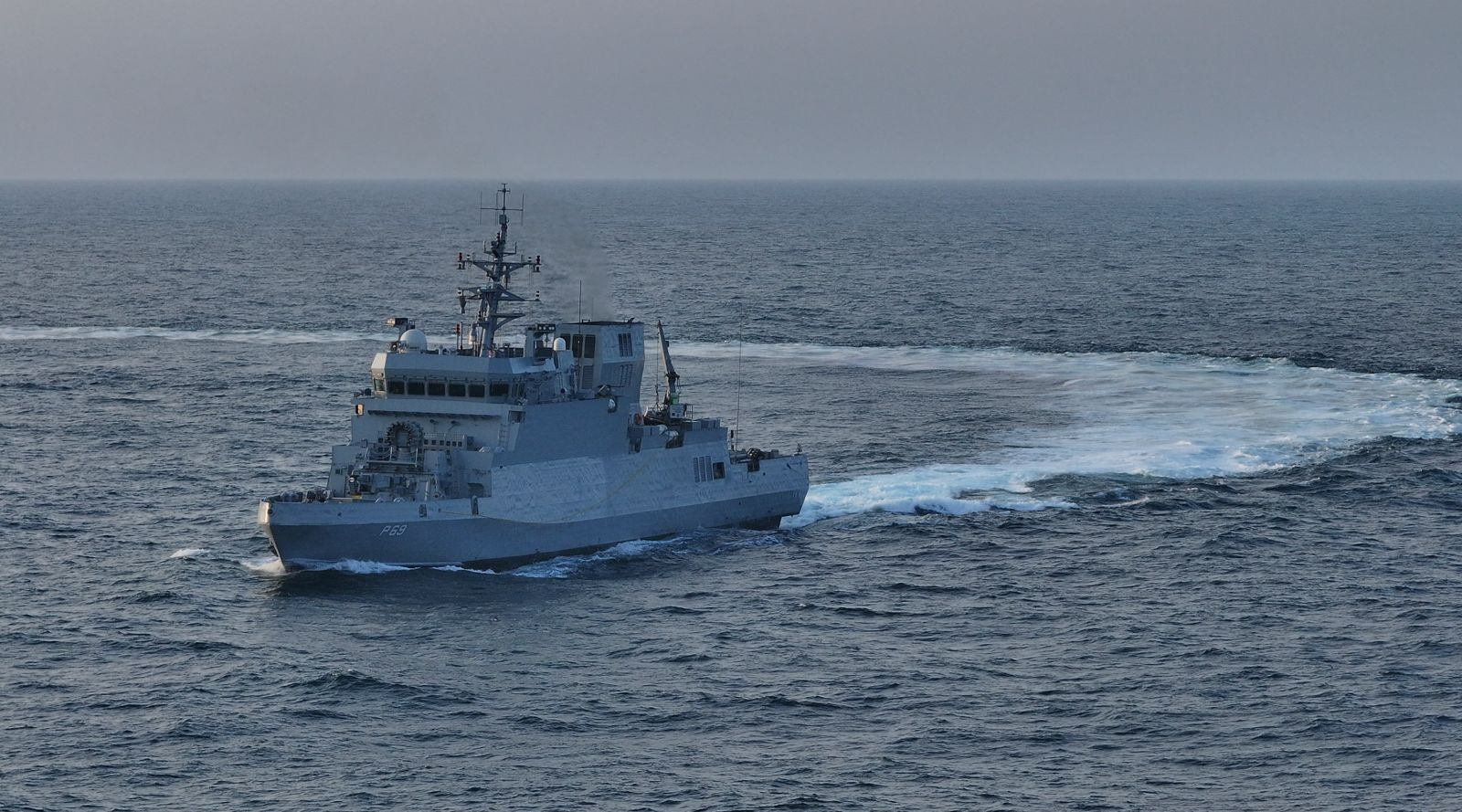
Androth (P69) during sea trials.

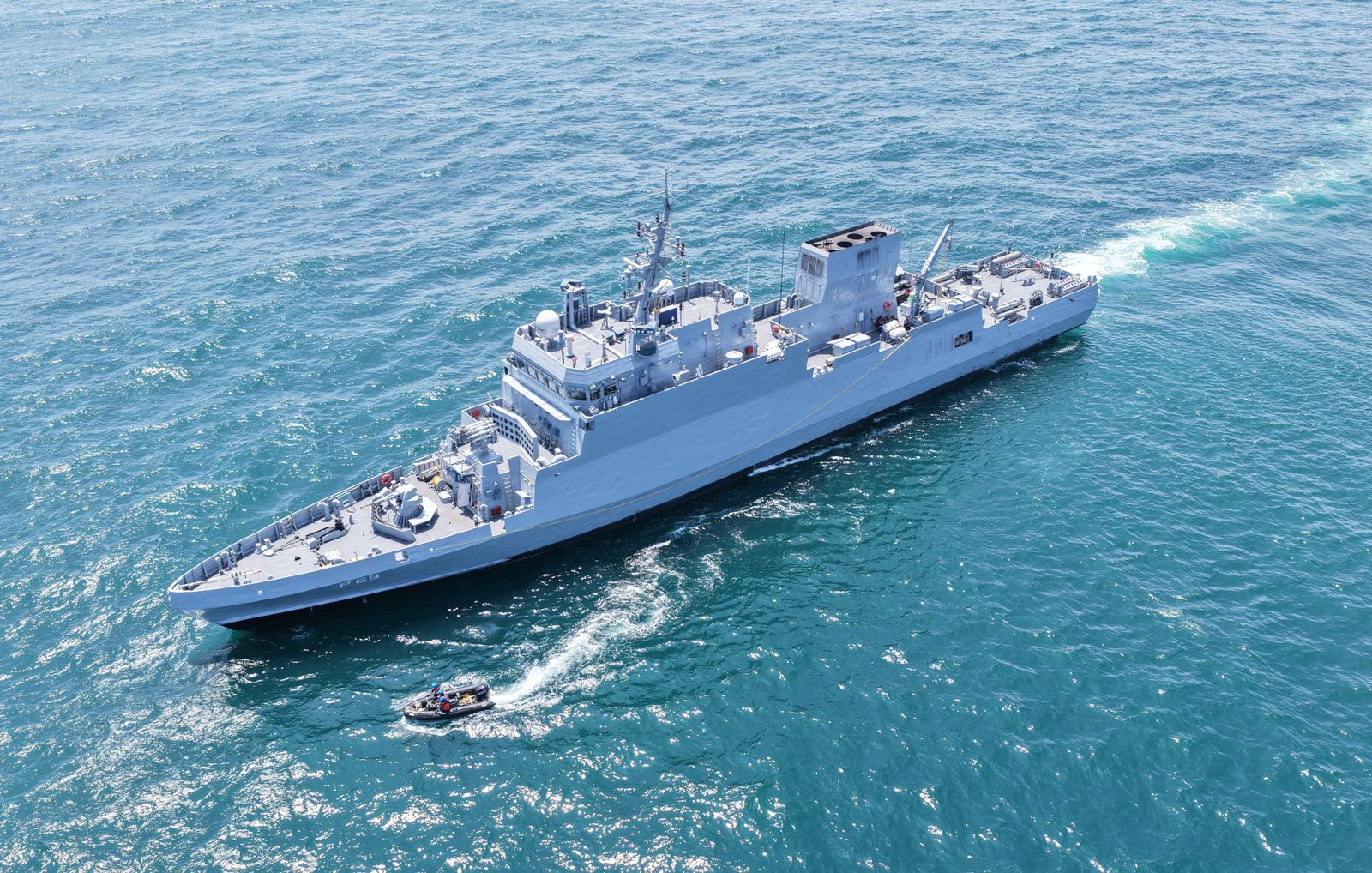
INS Androth during sea trials
