= INS Amini (2023) =

Lead ship of ASW-SWC class corvettes of the Indian Navy

History

India
- Name: INS Amini
- Owner: Indian Navy
- Operator: Indian Navy
- Ordered: 29 April 2019
- Builder: Garden Reach Shipbuilders & Engineers (GRSE)
- Cost: ₹789 crore (US$84 million) (FY2020)
- Yard number: 3031
- Laid down: 17 June 2022
- Launched: 16 November 2023
- Sponsored by: Manju Naithani
- Acquired: 5 November 2026
- Identification: Pennant number: P75
- Status: Delivered

General characteristics
- Type: Anti-Submarine Warfare Shallow Water Craft
- Tonnage: 1,490 t (1,470 long tons) GT
- Displacement: 900 t (890 long tons)
- Length: 77.6 m (254 ft 7 in)
- Beam: 10.5 m (34 ft 5 in)
- Draft: 2.7 m (8 ft 10 in)
- Propulsion: 3 × MTU 20V 4000 M93L diesel engines; 3 × water-jet propulsion; Reversible reduction gears
- Speed: 25 knots (46 km/h; 29 mph)
- Range: 1,800 nmi (3,300 km; 2,100 mi) at 14 knots (26 km/h; 16 mph)
- Boats & landing craft carried: 1 x RHIB
- Crew: 57 (7 officers + 50 sailors)
- Sensors & processing systems: Combat suite: DRDO–BEL Integrated ASW Complex (IAC) MOD ‘C’ combat suite; Sonar: DRDO Abhay Hull-Mounted Sonar (HMS); Low Frequency Variable Depth Sonar (LFVDS); Underwater Acoustic Communication System (UWACS); Management systems: Integrated Platform Management System (IPMS); Automatic Power Management System (APMS); Battle Damage Control System (BDCS)
- Electronic warfare & decoys: Electronic warfare suite: Radar Electronic Support Measures; Communications Electronic Support Measures; Decoys: 2 × 6-barrel torpedo-countermeasure system
- Armament: Anti-submarine warfare: 1 × RBU-6000 anti-submarine rocket launcher; 2 × triple lightweight torpedo launchers (Advanced Light-Weight Torpedo (ALWT)); Anti-submarine mines (launched from mine-laying rails); Guns: 1 × Naval Surface Gun (30 mm); 2 × OFT 12.7 mm M2 Stabilized Remote Controlled Gun

INS Amini is the third ship of the Arnala sub-class of the Anti-Submarine Warfare Shallow Water Craft (ASW SWC). The ship was ordered by the Indian Navy .

== Design ==
The ship was designed as a shallow-water anti-submarine corvette to undertake littoral operations such as subsurface surveillance and interdiction, search-and-attack unit missions, low-intensity maritime operations and coordinated anti-submarine warfare operations with naval aircraft, with minelaying and search-and-rescue as secondary duties. The corvette was developed by GRSE's in-house design team using virtual reality tools and Aveva Marine design software. The ASW SWC ships are the Indian Navy's largest warships to be propelled by waterjets. The Arnala class are described as the Navy's quietest ships, and GRSE received the Raksha Mantri's Award in 2022 for designing them.

The anti-submarine armaments consist of an RBU-6000, two triple 324 mm torpedo launchers and minelaying rails. The ship employs a 30 mm Naval Surface Gun as the main gun, and two OFT 12.7 mm M2 Stabilized Remote Controlled Gun for surface warfare and self-defence. The ship has a network-centric warfare suite which includes the Abhay compact active hull-mounted sonar, a towed low-frequency variable-depth sonar, two navigation radars, an electronic warfare suite and SATCOM. The DRDO-developed Abhay active sonar system uses adaptive signal and information processing to detect, track and classify targets.

== Construction ==
On 29 April 2019, the MoD and GRSE signed a contract, valued at ₹6,311.32 crore (equivalent to ₹86 billion or US$910 million in 2026), for eight anti-submarine vessels, to be delivered between 2022 and 2026. The contract mandates the first vessel to be delivered within 42 months of the date of signing, with the remaining seven vessels delivered at a rate of two ships per year within 84 months.

GRSE outsourced a part of the construction of four of the corvettes to Kattupalli Shipyard of L&T Shipbuilding under a public–private partnership after receiving the contract. A similar arrangement was undertaken for the Survey Vessel (Large) project. Under the subcontract, GRSE retained responsibility for design, procurement, production planning and quality management whereas L&T carried out construction-related job.

The keel laying ceremony of the ship was conducted on 17 June 2022, along with her sister ship INS Anjadip. The ship was launched at the Katupalli Shipyard on 16 November 2023. The launch was presided over by Vice Admiral Sandeep Naithani, the then Chief of Materiel and the ship was launched by his wife, Mrs Manju Naithani. The ship was delivered to the Indian Navy on 5 November 2026.

=== Namesake ===
INS Amini was named after her predecessor, a retired Arnala-class corvette, which itself was a subclass of Soviet-origin Petya-class frigate and served the Indian Navy from 1974 to 2002. The ships are named after the Amini Island in the Lakshadweep archipelago.
