= INS Abhay =

INS Abhay may refer to the following vessels of the Indian Navy:

- INS Abhay (1961), an Ajay-class patrol vessel commissioned in 1961 and decommissioned in 1980
- INS Abhay (1989), an Abhay-class corvette commissioned in 1989
- INS Abhay (2024), launched in 2024
