= INS Anjadip =

INS Anjadip (P73) may refer to the following vessels of the Indian Navy:

- INS Anjadip (1972), an Arnala-class corvette commissioned in 1972 and decommissioned in 2003
- INS Anjadip (2023), launched in 2023
