= INS Magdala (2024) =

Indian Navy anti-submarine corvette

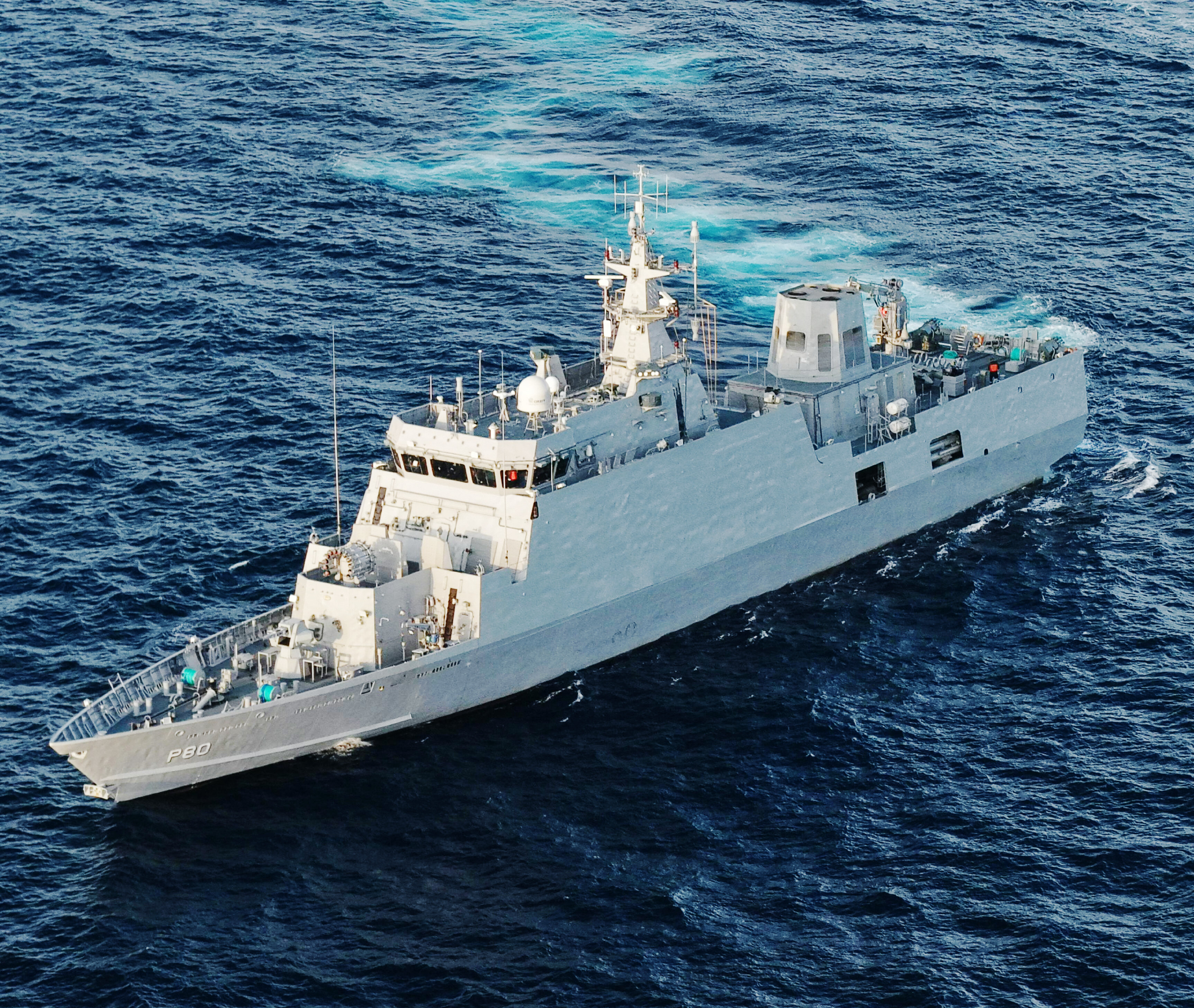
- Mahe (P80) an ASW-SWC class corvette at sea.

History

India
- Name: INS Magdala
- Namesake: Magdala
- Owner: Indian Navy
- Operator: Indian Navy
- Ordered: 30 April 2019
- Builder: Cochin Shipyard
- Cost: ₹789 crore (US$82 million) (FY2020)
- Yard number: 528
- Laid down: 16 December 2024
- Launched: 18 October 2025
- Status: Launched

General characteristics
- Type: Anti-Submarine Warfare Shallow Water Craft
- Displacement: 896–1,100 t (882–1,083 long tons)
- Length: 78 m (255 ft 11 in)
- Beam: 11.26 m (36 ft 11 in)
- Draft: 2.7 m (8 ft 10 in)
- Propulsion: Water-jet propulsion
- Speed: 25 knots (46 km/h; 29 mph)
- Range: 1,800 nmi (3,300 km; 2,100 mi) at 14 knots (26 km/h; 16 mph)
- Endurance: 14 days
- Boats & landing craft carried: 1 x RHIB
- Crew: 57 (7 officers + 50 sailors)
- Sensors & processing systems: Combat suite: ASW Combat Suite (presumably the DRDO-developed IAC MOD 'C' combat suite); Sonar: DRDO Abhay Hull-Mounted Sonar (HMS); Low Frequency Variable Depth Sonar (LFVDS); Management systems: Fire Control System (FCS); Integrated Platform Management System (IPMS); Automatic Power Management System (APMS); Battle Damage Control System (BDCS)
- Armament: Anti-submarine warfare: 1 × RBU-6000 anti-submarine rocket launcher; 2 × triple lightweight torpedo launchers (Advanced Light-Weight Torpedo (ALWT)); Anti-submarine mines (launched from mine-laying rails); Guns: 1 × Naval Surface Gun (30 mm); 2 × OFT 12.7 mm M2 Stabilized Remote Controlled Gun
- Notes: Largest class of waterjet-powered vessels in the Indian Navy.

INS Magdala is the sixth ship of the Mahe class of the Anti-Submarine Warfare Shallow Watercraft operated by the Indian Navy.

== History ==
=== Background ===
On 23 December 2013, the Defence Acquisition Council (DAC) –- the main acquisition panel subordinate to India's Ministry of Defence (MoD), approved the procurement of sixteen anti-submarine warfare (ASW) vessels capable of operating in shallow waters, at a cost of ₹13,440 crore (equivalent to ₹230 billion or US$2.4 billion in 2023), to replace the ageing Abhay-class corvettes of the Indian Navy – which were commissioned between 1989 and 1991. This includes the development of the vessels with about 700 t (690 long tons; 770 short tons) displacement and an operational radius of 200 nmi (370 km; 230 mi) from its home port. They would be built by Garden Reach Shipbuilders and Engineers (GRSE).

In June 2014, the MoD issued a tender, worth US$2.25 billion under the 'Buy and Make India' category to private-shipyards – including Larsen & Toubro (L&T), ABG Shipyard, Pipavav Defense and Offshore Engineering, Goa Shipyard (GSL) and Garden Reach Shipbuilders & Engineers (GRSE), for the procurement of the 16 anti-submarine vessels.

In October 2017, Cochin Shipyard (CSL) and Garden Reach Shipbuilders & Engineers (GRSE) emerged as the first and the second-lowest bidder in the tender, respectively. CSL had quoted a value of ₹5,400 crore (US$829.22 million) while GRSE had to match the bid value of CSL in order to get the contract.

=== Construction ===
The steel cutting of the sixth and seventh ship of the class was conducted on 30 August 2022 at BY 528 and 529 of the shipyard. The keel laying ceremony of the ship was conducted on 16 December 2024. The ship, christened as Magdala, was launched on 18 October 2025.

=== Purchase ===
On 29 April 2019, the MoD and GRSE signed a contract, valued at ₹6,311.32 crore (equivalent to ₹78 billion or US$810 million in 2023), for eight anti-submarine vessels, to be delivered between 2022 and 2026. The contract mandates the first vessel to be delivered within 42 months of the date of signing, with the remaining seven vessels delivered at a rate of two ships per year within 84 months.

On 30 April 2019, the MoD and CSL signed a similar contract for the construction of the remaining eight vessels – within a deadline of 84 months. Under this contract, the first ship was also expected to be delivered within a span of 42 months, with subsequent deliveries of two ships per year.

== Design ==
The basic design of the ships have been sourced from Kochi-based Smart Engineering & Design Solutions (SDES) followed by detailed design by the shipyard. Additionally, Finland-based Surma provided the signature management software and design inputs for combat survivability features. The ships are being constructed as per the classification rules of Det Norske Veritas (DNV). The ships have indigenous content of over 80%, with equipment and materials being sourced from Bharat Electronics, Mahindra Defence, and Larsen & Toubro among others.

Mahe-class has a displacement of 896–1,100 t (882–1,083 long tons). The class of warships is considered as the largest warship of the Indian Navy to be designed and propelled by pump-jet technology. The warship is equipped with three marine diesel engines, developing a power output of 6 MW, and is coupled with a water jet each. By dimensions, the ship measures 78 m (256 ft) by length and 11.36 m (37.3 ft) by width with a draft of 2.7 m (8 ft 10 in). The ships offers a maximum speed of 25 kn (46 km/h; 29 mph) and a maximum range of 1,800 nmi (3,300 km) at a speed of 14 kn (26 km/h) with an endurance of 14 days.

=== Weapons ===
The weapons suite of Mahe-class is designed to support its intended anti-submarine warfare operations in shallow waters. The anti-submarine weapons that equip the ship includes a forward-mounted RBU-6000, a triple 324 mm lightweight torpedo tube each on port and starboard equipped with Advanced Light-Weight Torpedo (ALWT) at the aft and anti-submarine mine-laying rails. Behind the torpedo tubes, two Mahindra Defence Systems-supplied torpedo decoy launching systems (DLS), as a part of the Integrated Anti-Submarine Warfare Defence Suite (IADS).

For surface warfare and self-defence, the ship employs a 30 mm Naval Surface Gun, which serves the role of main gun as well as two OFT 12.7 mm M2 Stabilized Remote Controlled Gun (SRCG) as general-purpose machine guns. The SRCG is the Indian variant of Elbit Systems' Remote Controlled Naval Weapon Station (RCNWS).

=== Sensors ===
As part of its sensor suite, Mahe-class is equipped with Abhay compact active hull-mounted sonar (HMS), a towed low-frequency variable-depth sonar (LFVDS) procured from a joint venture firm between Indian CFF Fluid Control Ltd. and German Atlas Elektronik, a division of ThyssenKrupp Marine Systems (TKMS) along with an underwater acoustic communication system (UWACS).

The Abhay active sonar system — developed by DRDO's Naval Physical and Oceanographic Laboratory (NPOL) and manufactured by Bharat Electronics Limited (BEL) — includes transducer array, data acquisition system, power amplifier and the dual multi-function console (DMFC). The system utilises advanced adaptive signal and information processing techniques to detect, track and classify of targets. The compact system helps in the application of the systems onto smaller category of naval warships like Shallows Water Crafts, Light Frigates & Patrol Vessels by replacing legacy Russian sonar. Earlier, hull-mounted sonars were only limited to frigates and destroyers.

The ships are also equipped with Electronic Support Measures (ESM), Electronics Intelligence (ELINT) and a combat management system.

== See also ==
- Future of the Indian Navy
- List of active Indian Navy ships
