= Underwater domain awareness =

Underwater component of maritime domain awareness

Underwater domain awareness (UDA) is the aspect of maritime domain awareness focused on the underwater sector, including, from a security perspective, sea lines of communication (SLOC), coastal waters and varied maritime assets with reference to hostile intent and the proliferation of submarine and mine capabilities intended to limit access to the seas and littoral waters. The military requirement is not the only motivation for undersea domain awareness. The earth's undersea geophysical activities as they relate to the well-being of humans is also relevant, as monitoring such activities can provide vital clues to minimize the impact of devastating natural disasters.

Undersea commercial activities need precise inputs on the availability of resources for exploitation providing the best possible results for economic gains. The regulators, on the other hand, need to know the pattern of exploitation to manage a sustainable plan. The many activities, commercial and military, have created a significant impact on the environment; therefore, conservation initiatives need to precisely estimate any resulting habitat degradation and species vulnerability and assess the status of affected ecosystems. The scientific and research communities are engaged in efforts to update available knowledge and access to the multiple aspects of the undersea domain.

== History ==
Possibly the first reference of the term underwater domain awareness (UDA) is seen in a paper by Lt. Cdr. David Finch, titled "Comprehensive Underwater Domain Awareness: A Concept Model" in fall 2011, published in Canadian Naval Review. In this article, Finch makes no reference to maritime domain awareness while discussing underwater domain awareness. The Americans who originated this term, have used MDA as an enabler for the Maritime Operational Threat Response Plan. The MDA framework as declared in the October 2005 US document "National Plan to Achieve Maritime Domain Awareness for the National Strategy for Maritime Security" has no mention of the underwater threat or its mitigation strategy. While formulating the MDA framework in the early 21st century, the Americans did not consider the underwater threat to be substantial whereas post 9/11, the US administration did recognize the possibility of terrorists using other means to harm US interests; however, the underwater threat did not explicitly figure in their strategic formulations. The author Steven C Boraz brings out the myths and realities of the era and recognizes the limitations of a Navy driven MDA. The US Coast Guard is the primary agency responsible for MDA through the Ports, Waterways, and Coastal Security (PWCS) mission. Significant investments have been made for their surface and air assets along with increased command and control capabilities; however, little has been done to expand the PWCS mission to the underwater domain. Nation states like the US, Japan, Germany, North Korea, and Iran have credible submersible capabilities that can be deployed to carry out large scale damage to maritime assets. These states are also known to assist non-state actors against targeted adversaries or generic terrorist activities. Moro Islamic Liberation Front (MILF), Revolutionary Armed Forces of Colombia (FARC) and the Liberation Tigers of Tamil Eelam (LTTE) have been documented for their submersible capabilities and deployment against their stated adversaries.

The underwater wireless sensor networks (UWSNs) used in multiple applications of underwater surveillance have unique challenges in terms of harsh underwater channel behavior with low bandwidth, high propagation delays, and higher bit error rates. Additionally, the variable speed of sound, and non-negligible node mobility due to water currents pose a unique set of challenges for localization in UWSNs. The underwater technology development and more specifically acoustic technology development matured during the cold war period when the US and the Soviet Union invested heavily in the deep waters and achieved significant success in stabilizing sonar performance. Massive experiments were undertaken at sea to validate the algorithms and minimize the medium uncertainties. After the cold war, the naval theatre's shift to littoral waters presented their own challenges; thus, principles that stabilized sonar performance in deep waters did not apply, resulting in sub-optimal performance. During the Cold War, military investments and developments in technology for national security received high priority from the political leadership; however, that same level of support was not extended into the post Cold War period.

The Sound Surveillance System (SOSUS) was a top-secret project involving a large scale, underwater sensor network driven by the US Navy from 1949 to monitor Russian vessels in the GIUK Gap. Towards the later part of the cold war, the facility was opened to academic research in an effort to support operational and maintenance costs. Doing so resulted in a significant boost to research in the field of underwater acoustics, leading to the stabilization of sonar performance in deep waters for multiple non-military applications. The Naval Facility Point Sur experimental facility which was started in 1958 was shut down in 1984 for lack of funding. The ship shock test facility and the SURTASS-LFA project was shifted and scaled down due to environmental concerns raised by the Natural Resources Defense Council (NRDC). NRDC compelled the Navy to file environmental impact statement (EIS) for the first time in the early 90s. In 1996, 13 Cuvier's beaked whales were found stranded alive off the coast of Kyparissiakos Gulf, Greece. Alexandros Frantzis, the scientific director of the Pelagos Cetacean Research Institute linked the stranding to the use of sonar in the immediate area. North Atlantic Treaty Organization (NATO), was involved in a joint international experiment using a high powered low-frequency sonar at the time of the stranding. The event became a rallying point for environmental activists who demanded a complete ban on such trials, and the US Navy agreed to fund research to determine the impacts on marine animals. These incidents and more reflected a major shift in geopolitical realities where socio-economic issues had to be balanced with national security demands.

=== India and the Indian Ocean region ===
21st century India is emerging as a maritime nation with a significant strategic push for maritime capability and capacity building. There has been a shift from a continental outlook to maritime power, and involvement in regional and global geostrategic and geopolitical formulations. The growing recognition of the Indo-Pacific as a single strategic space and a construct to counter growing Chinese dominance in the region also recognizes India's centrality to the global influences and the increasing role of India in America's strategic calculations. The underwater component of the MDA that may be referred as underwater domain awareness (UDA), has somehow not been given enough attention that it deserves particularly in the Indian Ocean, given the security threats that exist, perpetuated by the non-state actors. In the context of India in the Indian Ocean Region (IOR), there are multiple unique challenges to achieve effective UDA, both socioeconomic, and science and technology-driven, that are rooted in its geostrategic origin.

Efforts countries in the region to import technology and strategy from the west have produced limited outcomes. The present understanding in many strategic discourses is that UDA is an extension of MDA, more focused on security requirements given the volatile regional dynamics. However, the sub-optimal performance of the sonar systems that may be deployed for any situational awareness efforts, in the tropical littoral waters of the IOR will present significant challenges. Thus massive acoustic capability and capacity building would be the core requirement for any UDA framework. The fragmented approach by the stakeholders, namely the national security apparatus, the blue economic entities, the environment and the disaster management authorities, and the science and technology providers have always limited the resource availability for any indigenous efforts to overcome local challenges. The UDA framework proposed in this work goes beyond being a mere underwater extension of the MDA formulation as understood so far and attempts to bring a more comprehensive formulation that facilitates pooling of resources and synergizing of efforts across stakeholders both at the national as well as the regional level to be able to truly participate in the Indo-Pacific strategic space. The proposed UDA framework is intended to ensure a safe, secure, sustainable growth model for all in the region to complement the "Security And Growth for All in the Region" (SAGAR) vision announced in March 2015.

== Concept ==
The concept of underwater domain awareness (UDA) in a more specific sense describes the desire to know what is happening in the undersea parts of relevant maritime areas. From the security perspective, this includes defending Sea lines of communication (SLOC), coastal waters, and varied maritime assets against the proliferation of submarines and mine capabilities intended to limit the access to the seas and littoral waters. The military requirement is not the only motivation to generate undersea domain awareness. Undersea geophysical activities have a lot of relevance to the well-being of humankind, and monitoring such activities could provide vital clues to minimize the impact of devastating natural calamities.

Commercial activities in the undersea realm need precise inputs on the availability of resources to be able to effectively and efficiently explore and exploit them for economic gains. The regulators on the other hand need to know the pattern of exploitation to manage a sustainable plan. With so much commercial and military activity, there is significant impact on the environment. Any conservation initiative needs to precisely estimate the habitat degradation and species vulnerability caused by these activities and assess the ecosystem status. The scientific and research community needs to engage and continuously update knowledge of the multiple aspects of the undersea domain. The underlying requirement for all the stakeholders is to know the developments in the undersea domain, make sense out of these developments and then respond effectively and efficiently to them before they take shape of an event.

The UDA on a comprehensive scale needs to be understood in its horizontal and vertical construct. The horizontal construct would be the resource availability in terms of technology, infrastructure, capability and capacity specific to the stakeholders or otherwise. The stakeholders represented by the four faces of the cube will have their specific requirements, however the core will remain the acoustic capacity and capability. The vertical construct is the hierarchy of establishing a comprehensive UDA. The first level or the ground level would be the sensing of the undersea domain for threats, resources and activities. The second level would be making sense of the data generated to plan security strategies, conservation plans and resource utilization plans. The next level would be to formulate and monitor regulatory framework at the local, national and global level.

The User-Academia-Industry partnership can be formulated based on the user requirement, academic inputs and the industry interface. It will enable more focused approach and a well defined interactive framework. Given the appropriate impetus, the UDA framework can address multiple challenges being faced by the developing nations today. In the opinion of Arnab Das of the Maritime Research Centre at Pune, India, meaningful engagement of the young for nation building is probably the most critical aspect that deserves attention. Multi-disciplinary and multi-functional entities can interact and contribute to synergize their efforts towards a larger goal.

== Indo-Pacific strategic space ==
The 2017 National Security Strategy (NSS) revived the role of "Quad" (Australia, India, Japan, and the US) in regional activities and elevated India's status as a leading global power expected to play an active role in the region. The Indo-Pacific as defined by the Trump administration has more of the Pacific than Indian Ocean in its formulation.

The competitive diplomacy on display between India and China in the IOR is a measure of strategic power play on the Indo-Pacific space which was described by a commentator as "a battle for the soul of the Indo-Pacific". The Chinese have systematically built their Submarine capabilities to not only meet their own requirements but also to export to other regional allies. The Chinese provide a cheaper option for developing nations as against the traditional European military suppliers like Germany, France, and others. It not only supplies submarines to such countries but in return also controls their military actions in multiple ways. With support bases in the IOR, even conventional diesel submarines more suited to the littorals in large numbers from China can pose a formidable threat for India, if not detected on time. The Chinese have made their soft acoustic capability building a priority and have worked on it systematically. The 'Undersea Great Wall (UGW)' project has been an ambitious undertaking and an integral part of their soft acoustic capability initiative since 1980 but it was not announced by the China State ShipbuildingCorporation (CSSC) until Dec 2015. The CSSC announced that it would construct an underwater observation system in the disputed South China Sea region. The UGW is part of the major project to set up an offshore observation network by 2020, released by the State Oceanic Administration. The stated larger vision of the Chinese government is to be seen as a global maritime power with a network covering coastal waters, the high seas, and polar waters.

=== Indian Ocean region ===
The IOR has emerged as a strategically important sea area and is getting exposed to the consequent vulnerabilities. The political and economic factors are abetting the strategic risks impacting security and stability in the region. The uniqueness of the IOR could be categorized as economic, political and physical to better understand the challenges and opportunities The economic aspect driven by energy and commerce that crosses the region in both the directions has seen a massive jump over the last two decades. Forty percent of the global energy flows from the Persian Gulf to the east (India, China, and Japan). Also raw material from the African coast moves to the economic engines in the Far East including China, Korea, and Japan. On the return leg, we can see finished goods being carried in superships reaching the Middle East and Europe from Asia. The volume of trade has been recorded to have tripled from 2003 to 2012. The undersea area also offers vast reserves of minerals and food in multiple forms. The fishing in the IOR has a unique pattern as due to political instability and security concerns, certain parts have remained off-limits for fishing whereas others have been over-fished using so-called modern methods in the absence of regulatory framework and monitoring mechanisms. This has caused a severe imbalance in the fish stock across the region and also altered the coastal marine landscape. Fishing and fishermen are often a major cause of diplomatic intervention among nations in the region. The IOR is considered next richest in the deep sea minerals after the Pacific Ocean, including oil and gas, polymetallic sulfides, cobalt-rich crusts and other materials that have a high potential for accelerated economic growth. The ever-increasing global demand for resources could also lead to conflict among nations in the region with active backing from nefarious extra-regional powers in the absence of well-defined norms and regulations. The political aspect comprises over thirty countries that lie within, and some others that play a significant role in shaping the geopolitics of the region. These nations are marked by radical variation in terms of their level of economic development, level of political stability, relations with their neighboring nations, demographic pressures, governance maturity, ethnic and sectarian tensions and other differences. The diversity in human terms represented by races, cultures, and religion also plays a critical role in the political stability of the region. The asymmetry of economies and political power compounds the challenges. The economic stakes in the region compounded by the political instability among the regional powers and security concerns encourage the extra-regional powers to maintain their naval presence. On the other hand, the economic potential and presence of economic giants along with the lack of regional regulations also encourage piracy and maritime terrorism, further destabilizing the region. The power struggle among nations with pre-modern governance outlook also encourages the application of non-state actors to resolve disputes. The fragmented regional geopolitics is a major impediment for pooling of resources and synergizing efforts to evolve a mature regional governance model.

The physical aspect comprises the tropical littoral waters in the IOR that result in sub-optimal sonar performance to achieve any meaningful way ahead for effective UDA. The deep vs. shallow waters need to be defined acoustically before the physical challenges in the IOR can be properly appreciated. The hypsometric definition of deep waters is the edge of the continental shelf that marks the Exclusive Economic Zone (EEZ), where the 200 nautical miles end with an approximate water depth of 200 meters. Thus, hypsometrically less than 200 meters is defined as shallow. However, acoustically, whenever there are more interactions with the surface and bottom boundaries that translate to higher distortions due to multi path fading, is defined as shallow waters. Multipath propagation is governed by the depth of the sound axis that provides the SOFAR channel to minimize the surface and bottom interaction due to refraction towards the sound axis. The depth of the sound axis varies from as shallow as 50 meters near the poles to as deep as 2000 meters near the equator, so in the IOR there is little acoustically deep water, resulting in poor sonar behavior. To compound matters, the tropical region further adds to the surface fluctuations and also variations in the site-specific bottom variations thereby increasing the multi path distortions. It is also known that the rich biodiversity in the tropical waters contributes to the volume distortions of the sonar signal propagation making it a cocktail of complex signal modifications due to the local medium conditions. The order of performance deterioration is 70% in the IOR compared to the GIUK of Cold War fame. The import of technology as demonstrated by multiple nations in the region has not given any dividends in the absence of local efforts to overcome the medium challenges. Field experimental efforts require massive resource deployment and efficient utilization of know-how and long term sustained initiatives. Political instability, economic limitations, and technological challenges are a major impediment for progress in the region.

== Acoustic capacity and capability building ==
The post-Cold War period saw two major developments as far as UDA is concerned. The first is the shift in the underwater security activities (that has been the major driver for technology development) towards the littoral waters more popularly called littoral anti-submarine warfare (ASW). The second is the less aggressive and effective acoustic capacity and capability building thrust due to perceived lack of threat driven by the American hegemony. However, the early 21st century is seeing a significant revival of the acoustic capacity and capability building particularly to overcome the tropical littoral challenges. Three major components are important in acoustic capability and capacity building: sensors to collect raw data, acoustic analysis and application-specific interpretation of the data, and the network to transmit the actionable information in real time. The sensors have traditionally been the preserve of the few nations who make them and control their availability for strategic interests. It would be desirable to achieve self-reliance on underwater acoustic sensors, however, countries without these capabilities could still manage with imported sensors unless the political situation makes this impossible. The networking technologies have made significant progress and the global communication industry in the RF domain has evolved due to its commercial success. However, the acoustic analysis in the tropical littoral of IOR would require customized efforts to overcome the site-specific medium distortions. This would involve massive shallow water acoustic measurement (SWAM) experiments in the region to collect acoustic data followed by signal processing efforts to model the underwater channel and ambient noise.

The SWAM experiments will require two main inputs. First is platforms to access the nooks and corners in the undersea domain and the second is the signal processing abilities that will pre-process the data and undertake effective processing to derive meaningful inputs. The conventional ship-borne deployment of sensors has not yielded desired results and is significantly resource intensive to cover the massive area to be studied. Underwater gliders have proven to be the most suited platform for undertaking acoustic surveys in the underwater domain specifically for oceanographic data collection. The buoyancy engine driven underwater gliders are slow, relatively cheap, have long endurance and are less noisy, thus ideally suited for data collection for acoustic surveys. These platforms can be deployed in large numbers to cover huge areas and the output stitched together for data analysis. They are among the recent advancements in autonomous underwater vehicles (AUVs), but since they are not propeller driven can be used for acoustic data collection as they have low noise and long endurance. The acoustic analysis capabilities have also remained limited to a certain small group of countries, including US, France, Japan, Australia and members of the Nordic Acoustics Association (NAA). The tropical littoral ASW has been a recent phenomenon and some of these countries have successfully invested and developed capabilities to overcome the challenges. The Americans recognized Chinese expansion of influence in the maritime domain particularly in the South China Sea (SCS) only towards the end of the 20th century. The Asian Seas International Acoustics Experiment (ASIAEX) was a massive SWAM experiment they planned right at the beginning of this century. Initially, six US universities led by the University of Washington planned phase-1 of the project and in phase-2, 20 other universities from China, Taiwan, and others were included.

The US needed data to overcome the tropical littoral challenges in the SCS, so the entire experiment was funded by the Office of Naval Research (ONR) but led by the Academia to camouflage the strategic intent. ASIAEX was only the beginning, and the US government routinely undertook acoustic data collection post that by streaming acoustic arrays and deploying underwater drones in the SCS. The Chinese realized and accepted their limitation of undertaking such large scale SWAM experiments so participated with the Americans to learn. They followed it up with massive drive culminating in the Underwater Great Wall project. In Dec 2016 the Chinese seized a US underwater drone deployed from USNS Bowditch. The incident was an official declaration by the Chinese that they are now confident of taking forward their own acoustic development program. The Malaysia Airlines Flight 370 accident and the subsequent search operation was another geopolitical exercise to corner China and its acoustic capability and capacity development initiative by the west. Malaysia Airlines Flight 370 had more than 90% Chinese passengers and China was very keen to lead the search operation in the IOR, but the role was assigned to Australia, which possibly had no direct stake in the event. The massive acoustic capacity and capability development that happened during the three-year search operations with global funding was denied to China. Acoustic capacity and capability development in the tropical littoral can only happen with massive SWAM experimental initiatives. These are extremely resource intensive and need to be funded at a different scale and also supported with cutting-edge technology support both for hardware and software. The pooling of resources and synergizing of effort is inescapable both at the national and regional level.
