= Maritime interdiction =

Form of naval operations and tactics

Maritime interception (or naval interdiction) operations (MIOs) are naval operations that aim to delay, disrupt, or destroy enemy forces or supplies en route to the battle area before they do any harm against friendly forces, similar to air interdiction.

Maritime interdiction took place in both the First World War and Second World War during the Battle of the Atlantic campaigns (1914–1918) and (1939–1945). In several other campaigns, such as the Norwegian campaign and the Battle of the Mediterranean, naval interdiction campaigns took place.

Naval interdiction took place in the Persian Gulf, during Operation Southern Watch. They took place between the end of Operation Desert Storm in 1991 and the beginning of the Iraq War in 2003. These operations were conducted to ensure Saddam Hussein was not smuggling his oil out of Iraq, in violation of United Nations sanctions against Iraq. The operations involved the stopping and boarding of any and all ships transiting the Persian Gulf, and the Strait of Hormuz, to search for oil, weapons, and certain fugitives from justice. The first submarine to take part in these operations was the USS Asheville (SSN-758), in March and April 2000.

== See also ==
- Interdiction Assault Ship, proposed vessel for interdiction role.
