= INS Kamorta =

INS Kamorta is the name of the following ships of the Indian Navy, named for Kamorta Island:

- INS Kamorta (P77), a Arnala-class corvette in commission 1968–1991
- INS Kamorta (P28), lead Kamorta-class corvette commissioned in 2014

== See also ==
- Kamorta (disambiguation)
