= INS Kavaratti =

INS Kavaratti is the name of the following ships of the Indian Navy, named for Kavaratti atoll:

- INS Kavaratti (P80), a Arnala-class corvette in commission 1969–1986
- INS Kavaratti (P31), a Kamorta-class corvette commissioned in 2020
