= INS Kiltan =

INS Kiltan is the name of the following ships of the Indian Navy, named for Kiltan Island:

- INS Kiltan (P79), a Arnala-class corvette in commission 1969–1987
- INS Kiltan (P30), a Kamorta-class corvette commissioned in 2017
