= Kamorta =

Kamorta or Camorta may refer to:

- Kamorta Island, one of India's Nicobar Islands
  - Kamorta, Nancowry, a village on the island
  - Camorta language, an Austroasiatic (Nicobarese) language spoken there
  - Camorta Island stripe-necked snake
  - SS Camorta, a 19th-century British steamship
  - Kamorta-class corvette, anti-submarine warfare stealth corvettes of the Indian Navy
    - INS Kamorta (P28), an anti-submarine corvette in the Indian Navy
  - INS Kamorta (P77), a ship in the Indian Navy
