= INS Kadmatt =

INS Kadmatt is the name of the following ships of the Indian Navy, named for Kadmat Island:

- INS Kadmatt (P78), a Arnala-class corvette in commission 1968–1992
- INS Kadmatt (P29), a Kamorta-class corvette commissioned in 2016
