= INS Kavaratti (P31) =

Indian Navy anti-submarine warfare corvette

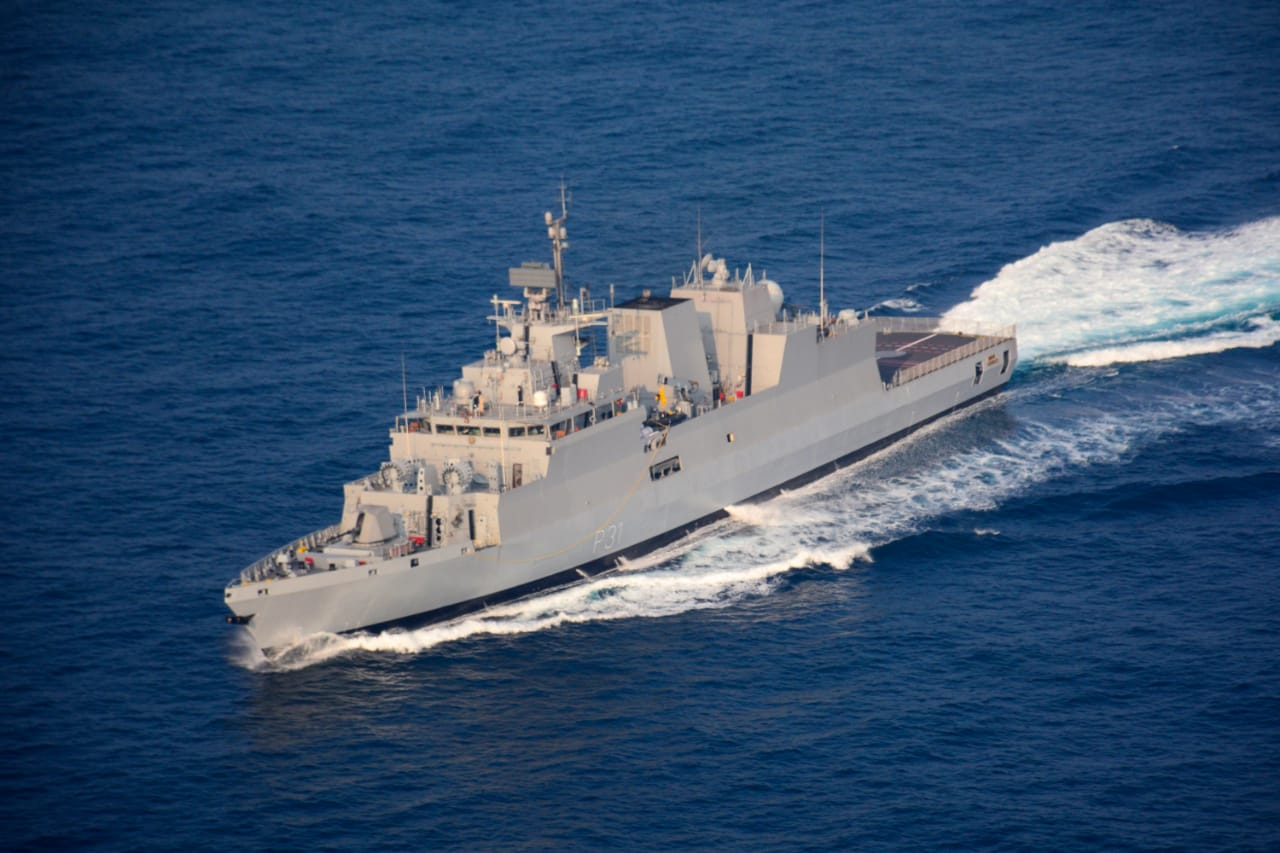
- INS Kavaratti during trials.

History
- Name: INS Kavaratti
- Namesake: Kavaratti
- Builder: Garden Reach Shipbuilders and Engineers
- Laid down: 20 January 2012
- Launched: 19 May 2015
- Acquired: 18 February 2020
- Commissioned: 22 October 2020
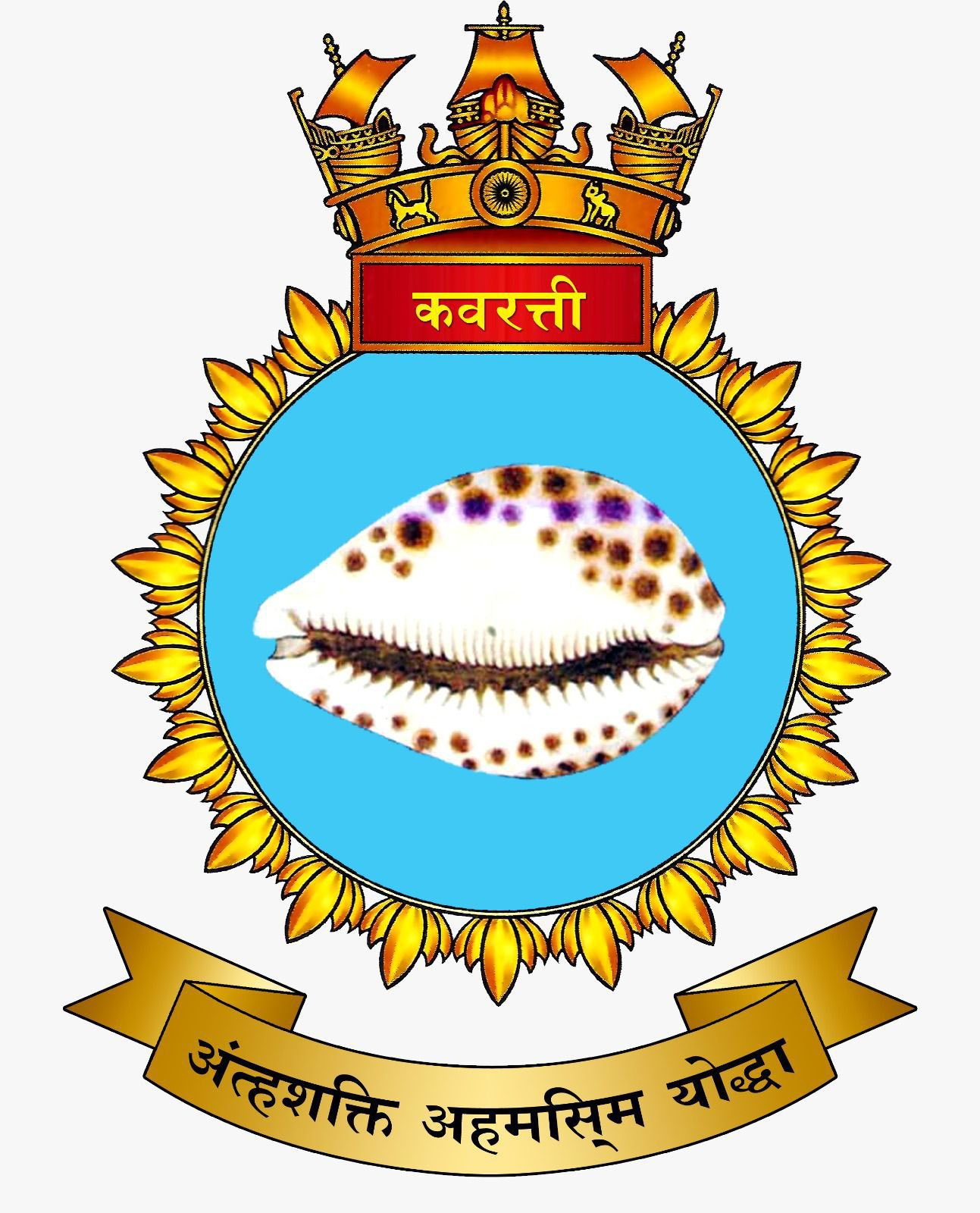
- Badge

General characteristics
- Class & type: Kamorta-class corvette
- Displacement: 3,300 tons
- Length: 109 m (358 ft)
- Beam: 12.8 m (42 ft)
- Propulsion: 4 × Pielstick 12 PA6 STC Diesel engines; CODAD, DCNS raft mounted gearbox
- Speed: 25 knots (46 km/h)
- Range: 3,450 mi (5,550 km) at 18 knots (33 km/h)
- Complement: 123 (incl 17 officers)
- Sensors & processing systems: Revathi Central Acquisition Radar; EL/M-2221 STGR fire-control radar; BEL Shikari; BEL RAWL02 (Signaal LW08) antenna communication grid - Gigabit Ethernet-based integrated ship borne data network, with a fiber optic cable backbone running through the vessel; NPOL HUMSA (Hull Mounted Sonar Array); Bomber Electronic warfare (EW) suites - BEL Ajanta
- Electronic warfare & decoys: Sanket electronic warfare system; Kavach decoy launcher; CMS-28 combat management system
- Armament: Anti-air weaponry: 1 × OTO Melara 76 mm Super Rapid Gun Mount (SRGM); 2 × AK-630M CIWS; To be outfitted with VL-SRSAM; Anti-submarine warfare: 2 × RBU-6000 (IRL) anti-submarine rocket launcher; 2 × quad torpedo tubes
- Aircraft carried: 1 × Westland Sea King Mk.42B or HAL Dhruv
- Aviation facilities: Rail-less helo traversing system and foldable hangar door

INS Kavaratti (P31) is an anti-submarine warfare corvette of the Indian Navy built under Project 28. It is the last of four Kamorta-class corvettes. The ship was built by the Garden Reach Shipbuilders and Engineers, Kolkata, and launched on 19 May 2015. It was commissioned into the Navy on 22 October 2020 in Visakhapatnam.

== Design ==
Kavaratti is India's one of the first ship to have a superstructure of carbon fibre composite material that has been integrated with its main hull resulting in lower top weight and maintenance costs and improved stealth features. The ship is 109 metres long and 12.8 metres broad and is highly maneuverable with a top speed of 25 knots. It has a displacement of 3,300 tonnes and a range of about 3,450 nautical miles at 18 knots. It is powered by 4 diesel engines that generate a combined power of 3000 kW and propelled by a main unit of four 3,888 kW diesel engines at 1,050 rpm.

Kavaratti is to be armed with a range of indigenously developed cutting-edge weapons and sensors, including "a medium-range gun, torpedo tube launchers, rocket launchers and a close-in weapon system". The ship will also contain an integrated communication system and an electronic warfare system. It has been designed by the Indian Navy's Directorate of Naval Design as part of Project 28. It is capable of fighting under nuclear, biological and chemical environments. It will be a frontline warship of the Indian Navy with advanced stealth features and a low radar signature that enhances its anti-submarine warfare capability. The ship will have a complement of 17 officers and 106 sailors.Kavaratti represents a leap forward in the Navy's attempts at indigenisation with as much as 90% of its content drawn from India itself.

== Construction and career ==
The keel of Kavaratti was laid on 20 January 2012 and it was launched in Kolkata on 19 May 2015. The ship cost an estimated ₹1,700 crores. The ship takes its name from the Kavaratti, capital of the Union Territory of Lakshadweep in India. It is the successor ship to the INS Kavaratti, which was an Arnala-class corvette which participated in Operation Trident, and was later decommissioned in 1986.

INS Kavaratti has completed sea trials and delivered to Indian Navy on 18 February 2020. The ship was commissioned into the Navy by India's the then Army Chief General Manoj Mukund Naravane on 22 October 2020.

Kavaratti was used as the testbed for the user trials of the indigenous Extended Range Anti-Submarine Rocket (ERASR) from its Indigenous Rocket Launchers (IRL), a variant of RBU-6000, between 27 June and 3 July 2025. A total of 17 rockets were successfully fired at different ranges during the trials.

Between 14 and 17 October 2025, the ship participated in Exercise Samudra Shakti with the Indonesian Navy corvette KRI John Lie (358) and its integral helicopter. The harbour phase was hosted in Visakhapatnam followed by the sea phar which included Helicopter Operations, Air Defence Exercises, Weapon Firing Drills, Visit, Board, Search and Seizure (VBSS) exercises.

INS Kavaratti participated at the International Fleet Review 2026 held at Visakapatanam.

In June 2026, a flotilla from the Eastern Fleet was operationally deployed to the South East Asia region. The flotilla is being commanded by the Flag Officer Commanding Eastern Fleet (FOCEF), Rear Admiral Alok Ananda, and consists of INS Udaygiri (F35) and Kavaratti. They reached at Nha Rong Port, Ho Chi Minh City, Vietnam, on 22 June. The crew of the ships conducted professional interactions with the personnel of the Vietnam People's Navy. The ships departed Vietnam on 24 June. Later, INS Shakti (A57) joined the flotilla. The three ships conducted a port call at the Sattahip Naval Base, Thailand from 27 to 29 June. The flotilla conducted their third port call at the Changi Naval Base, Singapore from 1 July.

Kavaratti took part in Sri Lanka–India Naval Exercise (SLINEX-26) from 17 to 21 September 2026 at the Visakhapatnam Port along with INS Jyoti (A58) and SLNS Sindurala (P624) of the Sri Lanka Navy.

== Gallery ==
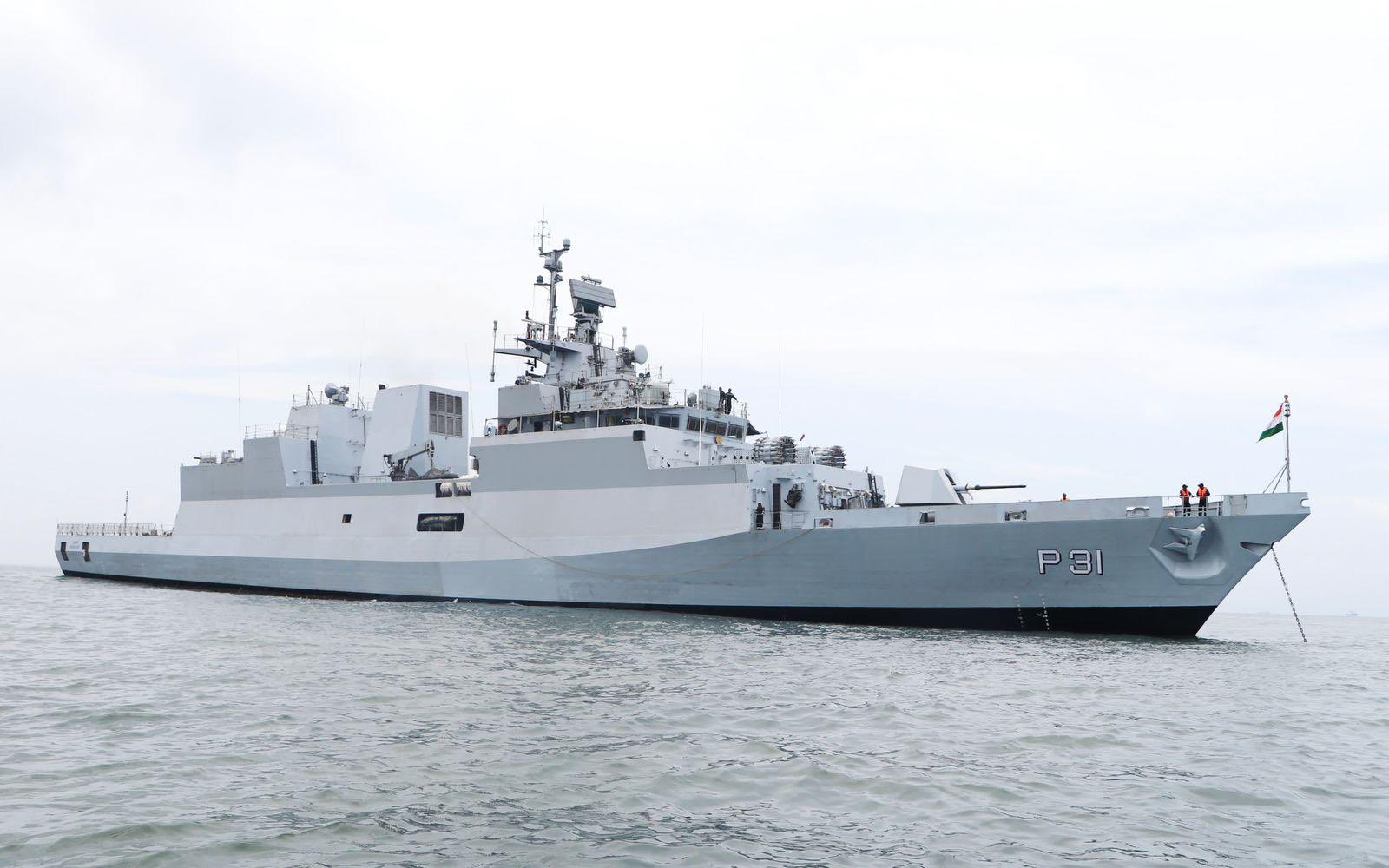
Kavaratti at sea

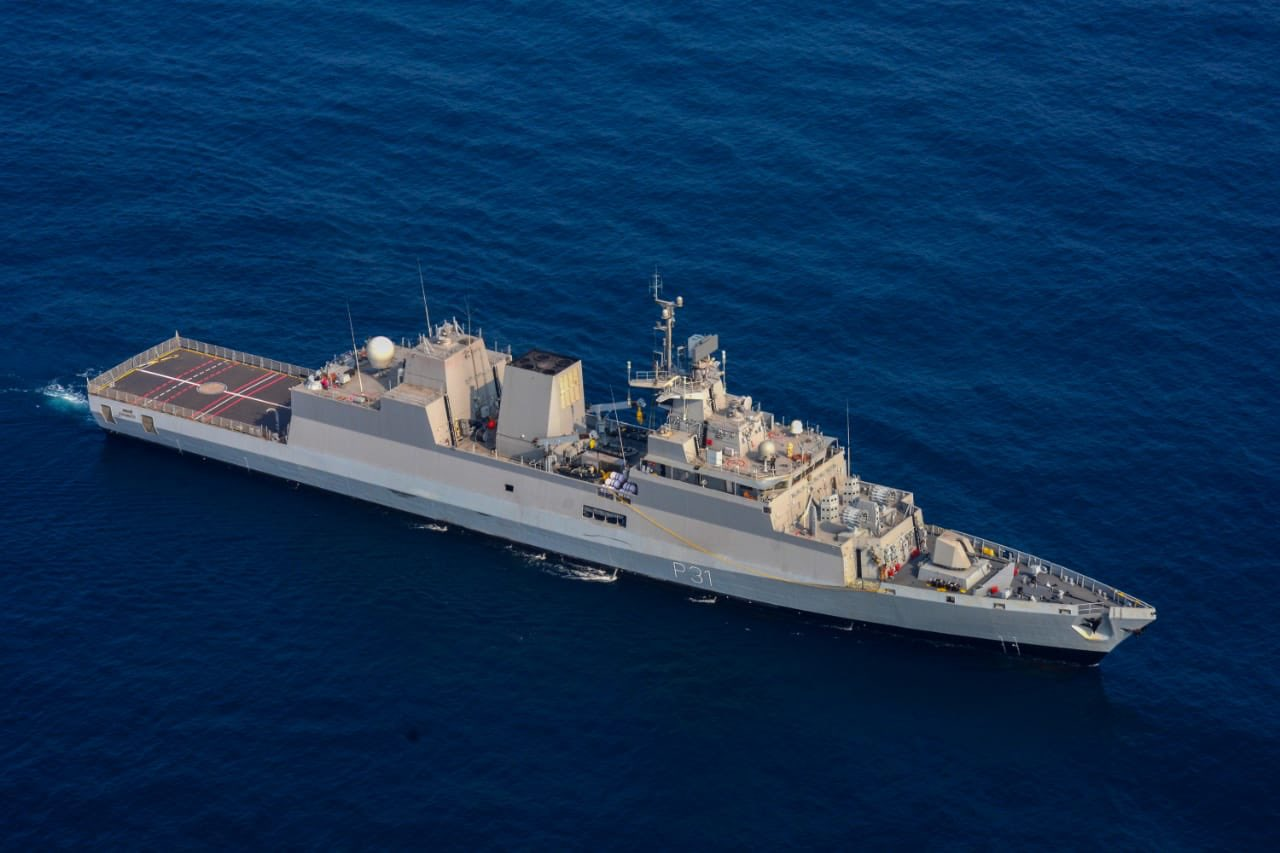
Kavaratti during trials

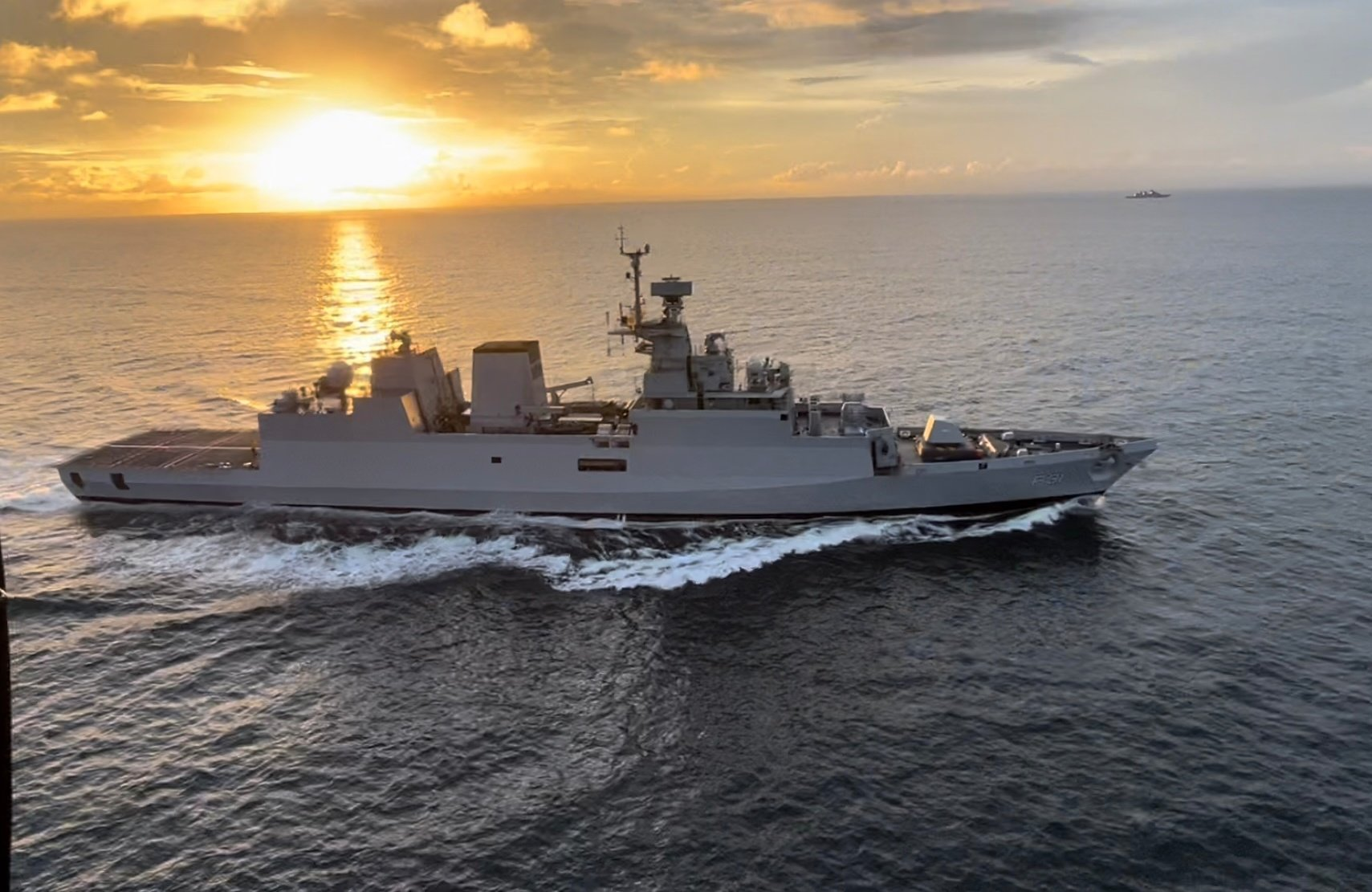
Kavaratti patrolling the Indian Ocean.

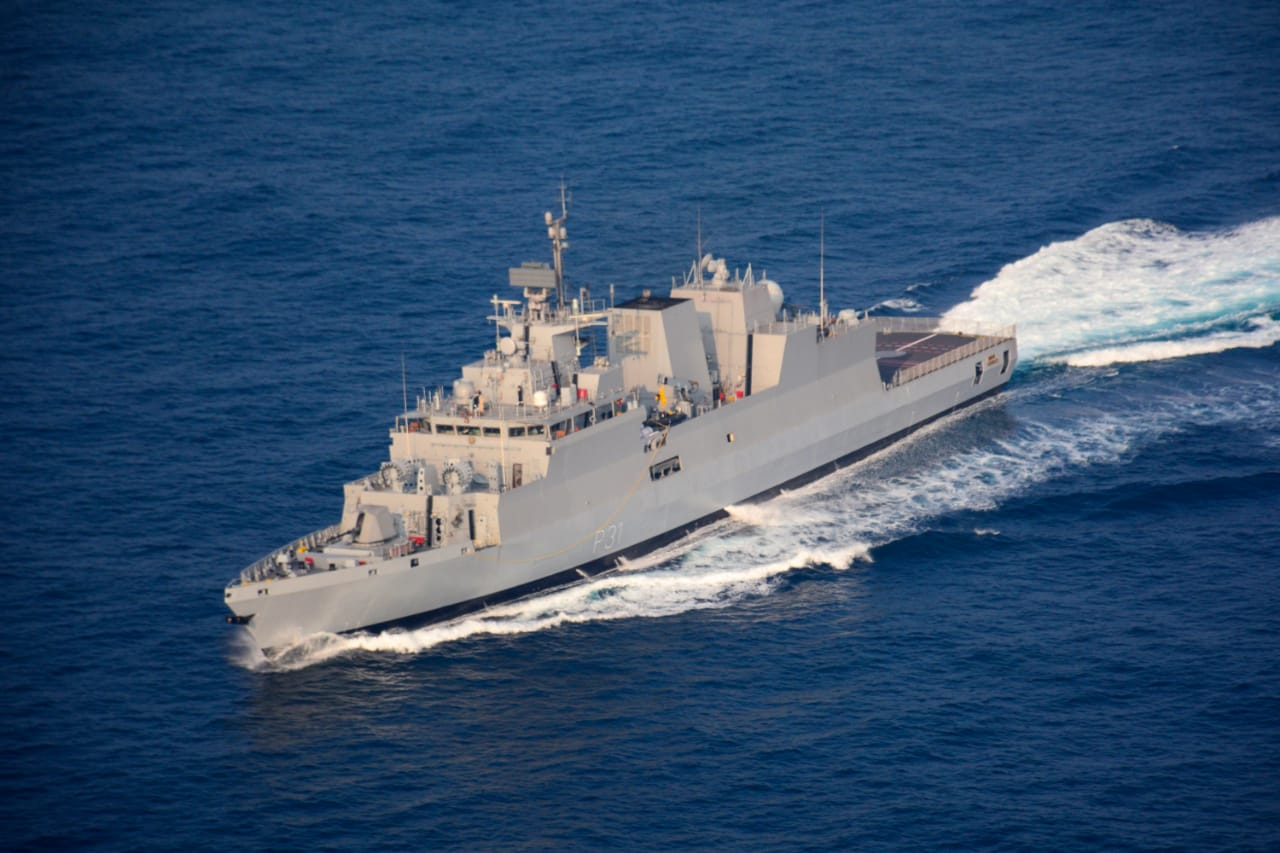
Kavaratti during trials
