= INS Kiltan (P30) =

Anti-submarine corvette of the Indian Navy

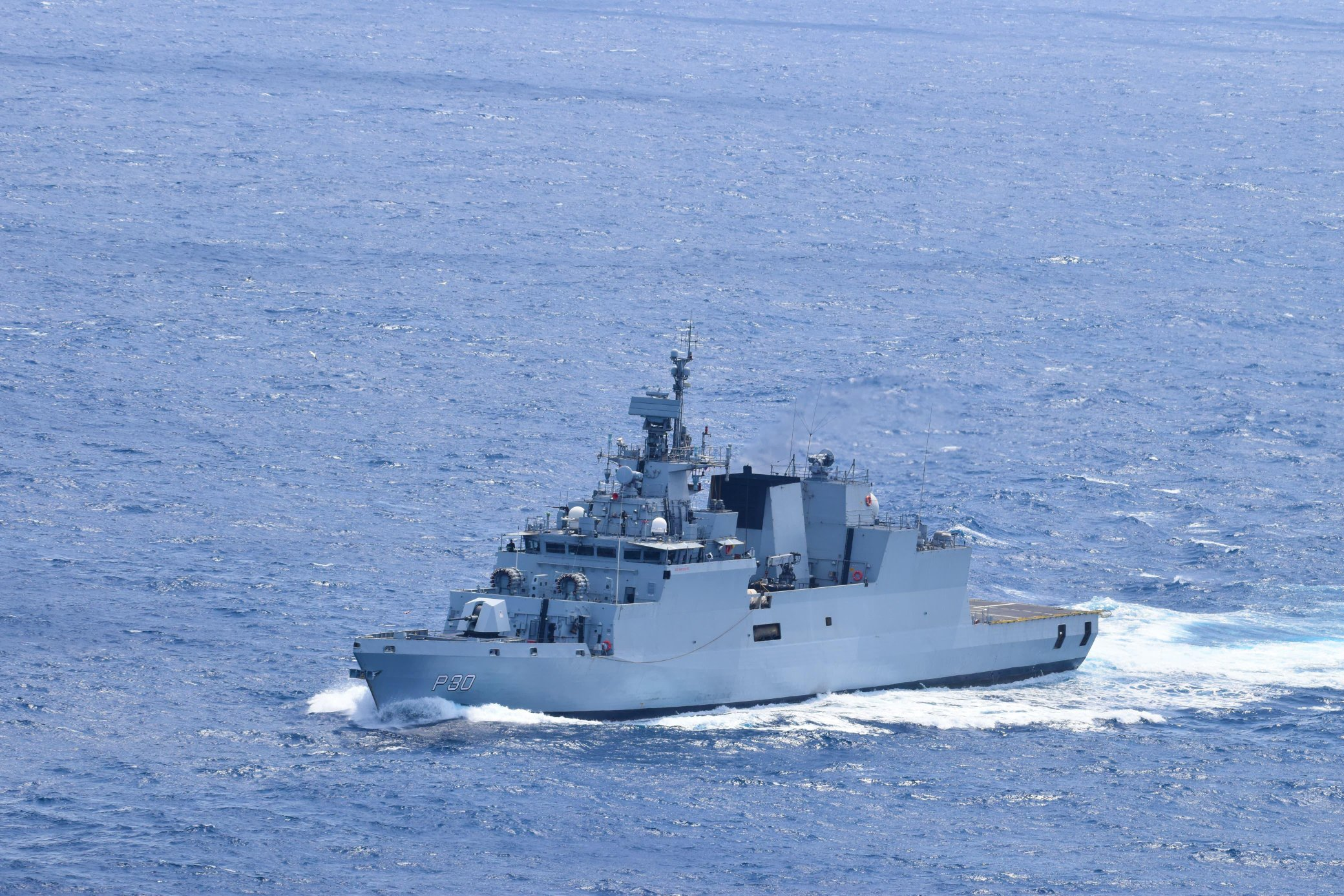
- Kiltan (P30) undertaking a voyage

History
- Name: INS Kiltan
- Namesake: Kiltan Island
- Builder: Garden Reach Shipbuilders and Engineers
- Laid down: 10 August 2010
- Launched: 26 March 2013
- Acquired: 14 October 2017
- Commissioned: 16 October 2017
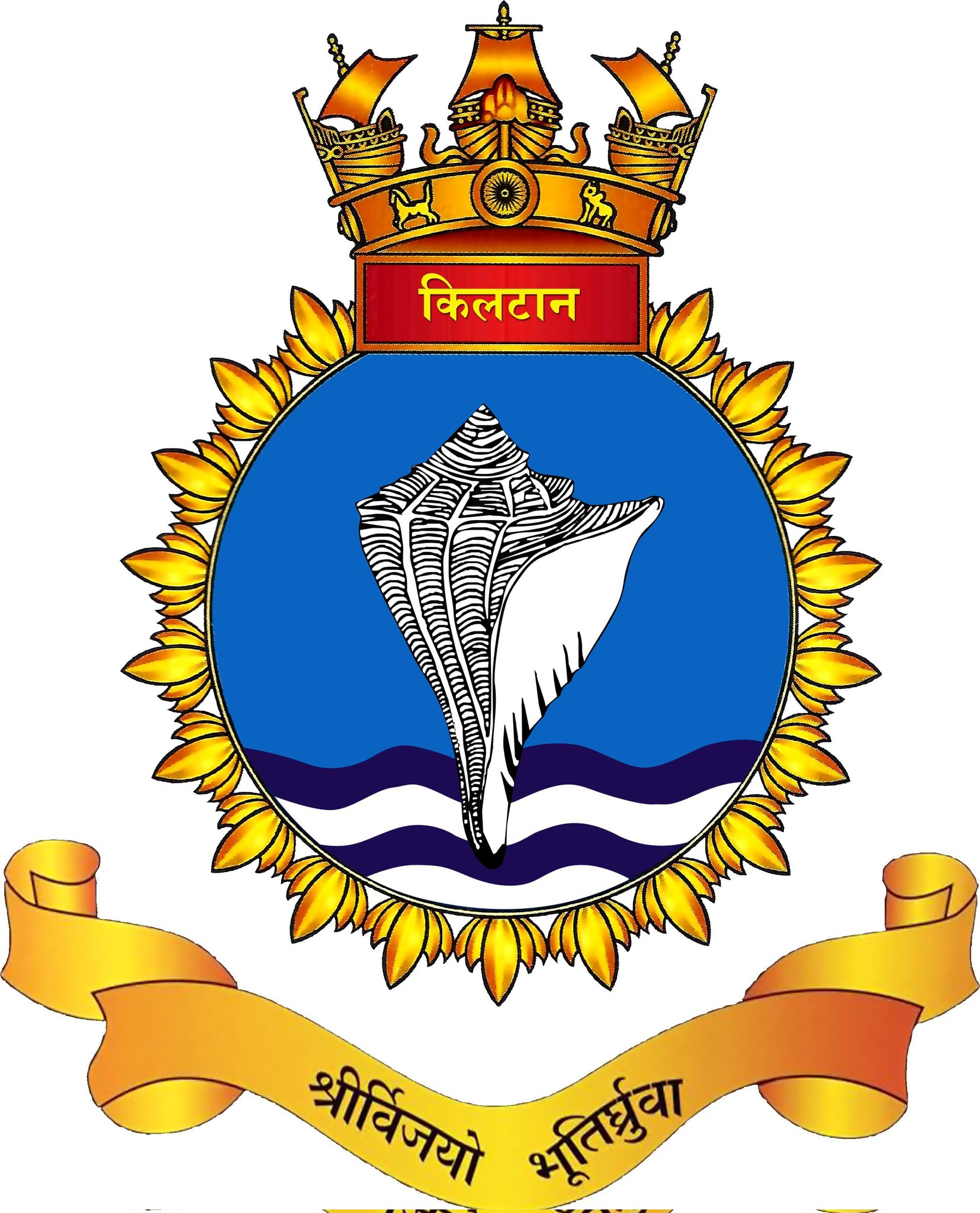
- Badge

General characteristics
- Class & type: Kamorta-class corvette
- Displacement: 3,300 tonnes (3,638 short tons)
- Length: 109 m (358 ft)
- Beam: 12.8 m (42 ft)
- Propulsion: 4 diesel motors
- Speed: 25 knots (46 km/h)
- Range: 3,450 mi (5,550 km) at 18 knots (33 km/h)
- Complement: 123 (incl 17 officers)
- Sensors & processing systems: Revati Central Acquisition Radar; EL/M-2221 STGR fire-control radar; BEL Shikari; BEL RAWL02 (Signaal LW08) antenna communication grid - Gigabit Ethernet-based integrated ship borne data network, with a fiber optic cable backbone running through the vessel; NPOL HUMSA (Hull Mounted Sonar Array); Bomber Electronic warfare (EW) suites - BEL Ajanta
- Electronic warfare & decoys: Sanket electronic warfare system; Kavach decoy launcher; CMS-28 combat management system
- Armament: Anti-air weaponry: 1×OTO Melara 76 mm Super Rapid Gun Mount (SRGM); 2×AK-630M CIWS; To be outfitted with VL-SRSAM; Anti-submarine warfare: 2×RBU-6000 (IRL) anti-submarine rocket launcher; 2×4 Torpedo tubes
- Aircraft carried: 1 × Ka-28PL or HAL Dhruv
- Aviation facilities: Rail-less helo traversing system and foldable hangar door

INS Kiltan (P30) is an anti-submarine warfare corvette of the Indian Navy built under Project 28. It is the third of four Kamorta-class corvettes. The ship was built by the Garden Reach Shipbuilders and Engineers (GRSE), Kolkata, launched on 26 March 2013, and commissioned on 16 October 2017.

== History ==
The keel of Kiltan was laid in August 2010 and it was launched in Kolkata on 26 March 2013 by Chitra Joshi, wife of Admiral D. K. Joshi, the Chief of Naval Staff. The ship cost an estimated ₹1,700 crores. The ship takes its name from the Kiltan Island, a coral island that is part of India's archipelagic Union Territory of Lakshadweep. It is the successor ship to the INS Kiltan, which was an Arnala-class corvette which participated in Operation Trident, and was later decommissioned in 1987.Kiltan represents a leap forward in the Navy's attempts at localisation with as much as 90% of its content drawn from India itself.

Kiltan was handed over to the Navy by the GRSE on 14 October 2017, and was commissioned into the Navy’s Eastern Naval Command in Visakhapatnam on 16 October 2017, in the presence of the then Defence Minister Nirmala Sitharaman and Navy chief Admiral Sunil Lanba.

== Design ==
The Kamorta-class has been designed by the Indian Navy’s Directorate of Naval Design as part of Project 28. It is capable of fighting under nuclear, biological and chemical environments. It will be a frontline warship of the Indian Navy with advanced stealth features and a low radar signature that enhances its anti-submarine warfare capability. The ship will have a complement of 17 officers and 106 sailors.

== Features ==
Kiltan is India's first ship to have a superstructure of carbon fibre composite material that has been integrated with its main hull, resulting in lower top weight and maintenance costs and improved stealth features. GRSE thus became the first defence shipyard in India to successfully fuse the carbon composite superstructure with the hull. The ship is 109 m (358 ft) long and 12.8 m (42 ft) broad and is highly maneuverable with a top speed of 25 knots (46 km/h; 29 mph). It has a displacement of 3,250 tonnes and a range of about 3,450 nautical miles (6,390 km; 3,970 mi) at 18 knots (33 km/h; 21 mph). It is powered by 4 diesel engines that generate a combined power of 3,000 kW (4,000 hp) and propelled by a main unit of four 3,888 kW (5,214 hp) diesel engines at 1,050 rpm.

Kiltan is to be armed with a range of Indian developed cutting-edge weapons and sensors including "a medium-range gun, torpedo tube launchers, rocket launchers and a close-in weapon system". The ship will also contain an integrated communication system and an electronic warfare system.

== Service history ==
=== 2024 ===
In May 2024, INS Kiltan along with INS Delhi (D61) and INS Shakti (A57) was a part of the three-ship flotilla led by Rear admiral Rajesh Dhankar, the FOCEF. On 6 May 2024, the flotilla reached Singapore for a three day visit as a part of operational deployment of the Navy's Eastern Fleet to the South China Sea. The flotilla will then proceed to Malaysia and Philippines, respectively. On 12 May 2024, INS Kiltan reached Cam Ranh Bay in Vietnam and will participate in a Maritime Partnership Exercise with the Vietnam People's Navy. Later, INS Kiltan rejoined INS Delhi and INS Shakti. On 20 May, the flotilla arrived at Manila, Philippines under the command of Rear Admiral Rajesh Dhankhar. During the visit, the navies will take part in an exercise and other activities like subject expert matter exchange, cross deck visits, cultural visits, collaborative community outreach programmes. On 23 May the flotilla completed its visit to Philippines which was a part of the Operational Deployment of the Eastern fleet to the South China Sea. On 25 May, Kiltan reached Muara, Brunei as a part of the deployment. The visit concluded with a Maritime Partnership Exercise with the Royal Brunei Navy on 29 May 2024.

=== 2025 ===
In July 2025, INS Kiltan was again deployed in the South East Asia as part of the four-ship flotilla under the command of Rear admiral Susheel Menon, the FOCEF. The flotilla included INS Delhi (D61), INS Satpura (F48) and INS Shakti (A57). The flotilla called on Singapore from 16 to 19 July. On 24 July, Delhi, Shakti and Kiltan called on Da Nang Port, Vietnam. The fleet was welcomed by the Vietnam People's Navy. On 1 August, the three ships arrived at Manila Port, Philippines. The ships also conducted the maiden joint sail and naval exercise with Philippine Navy on 3 and 4 August. The ships concluded their port call to Manila on 5 August.

=== 2026 ===
INS Kiltan participated at the International Fleet Review 2026 held at Visakapatanam.

== Gallery ==
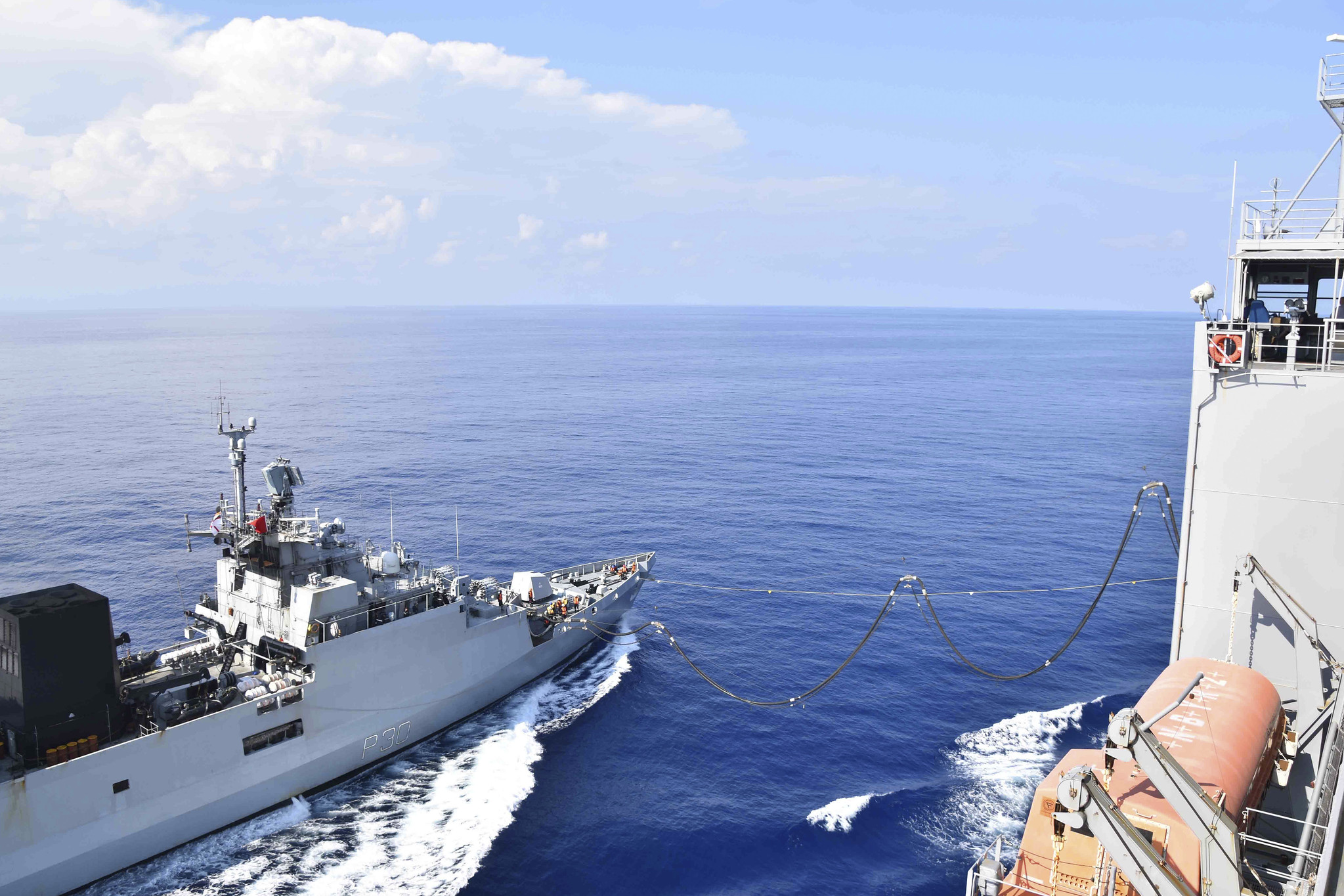
Kiltan replenishment at sea by USNS Richard E. Byrd (T-AKE-4).

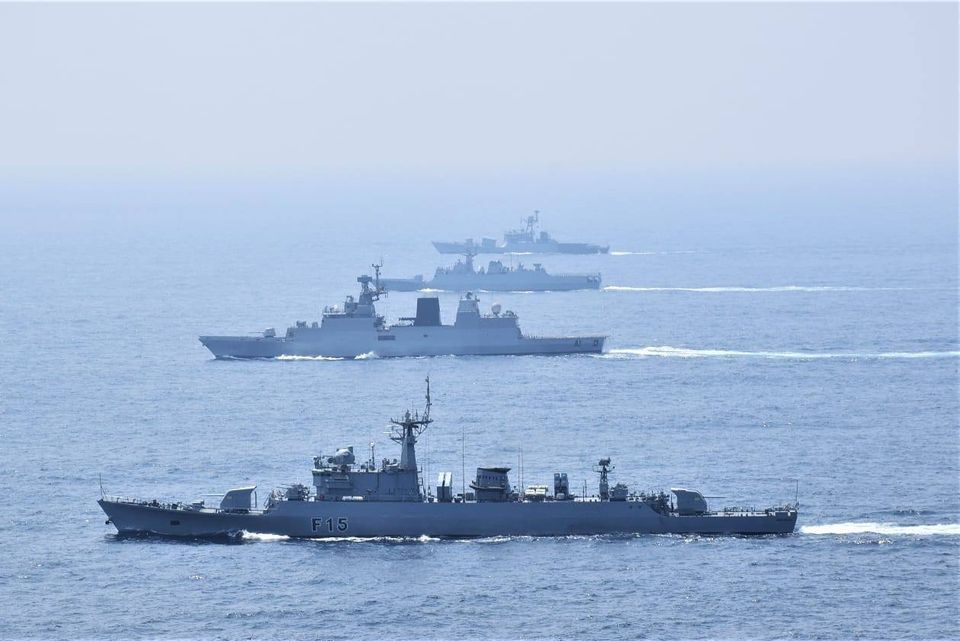
Kiltan (P30) with Bangladesh Navy ships BNS Abu Bakr and BNS Prottoy during Bongosagar exercise.

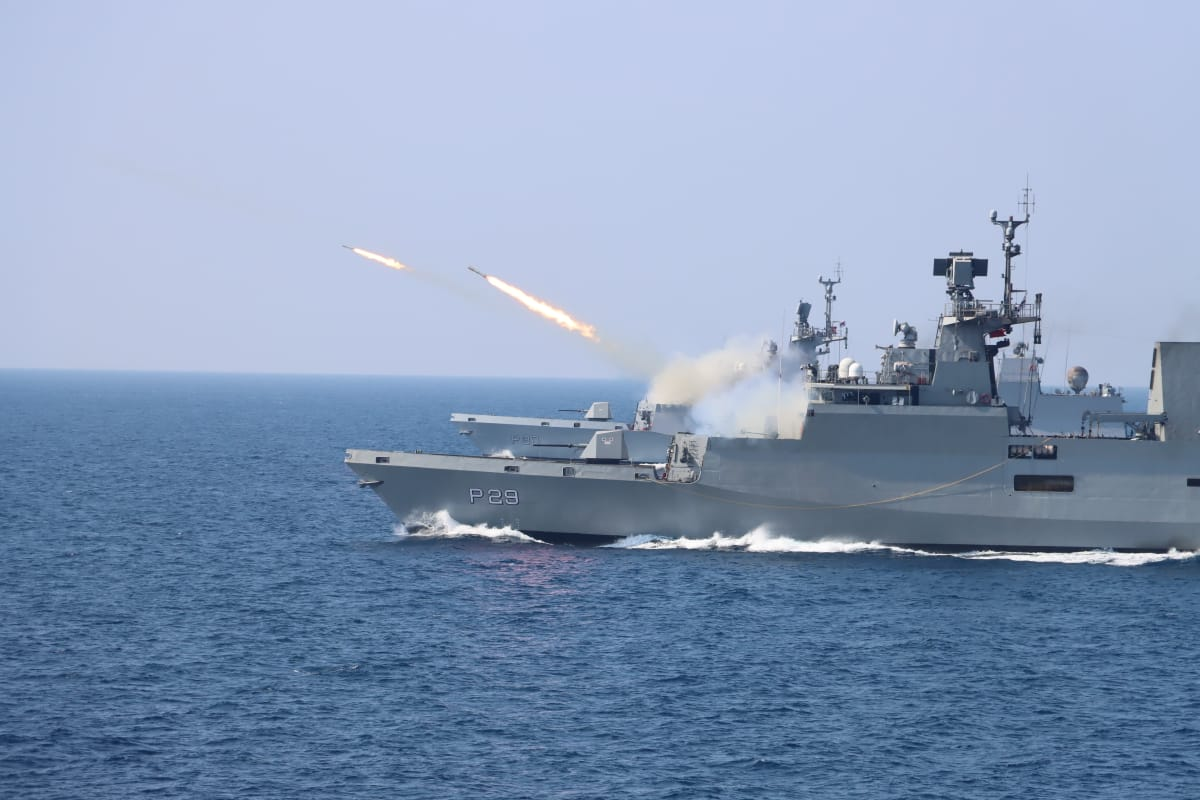
Kadmatt and Kiltan during anti-submarine firing drills.

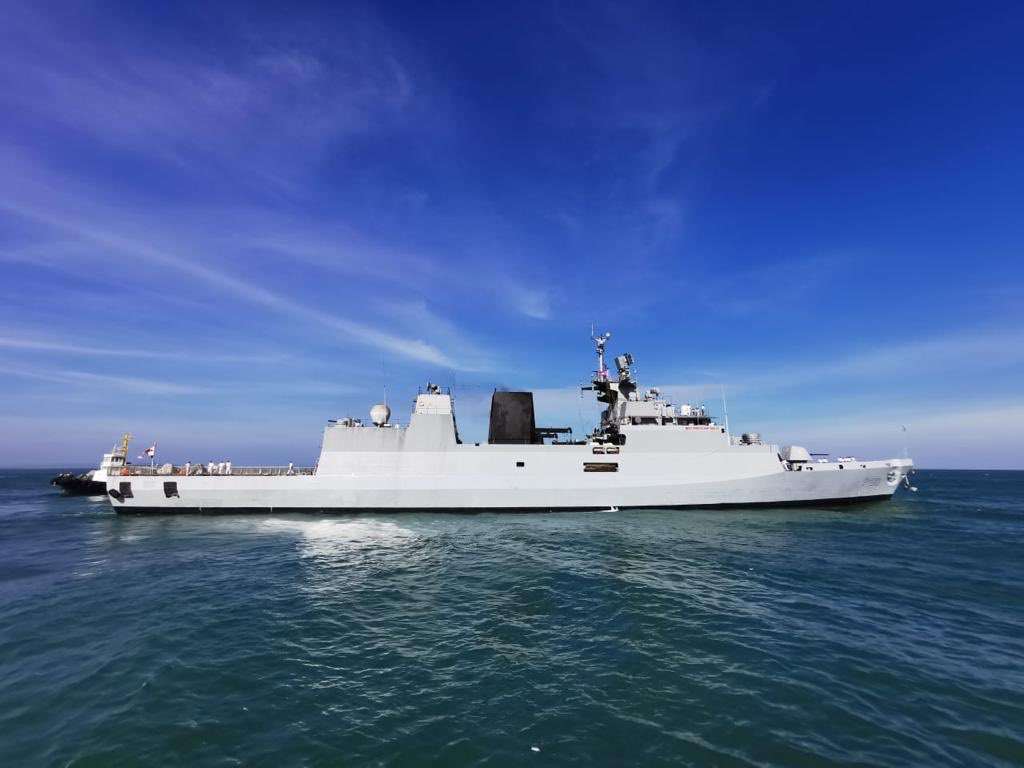
Kiltan departs Sihanoukville Autonomous Port port.

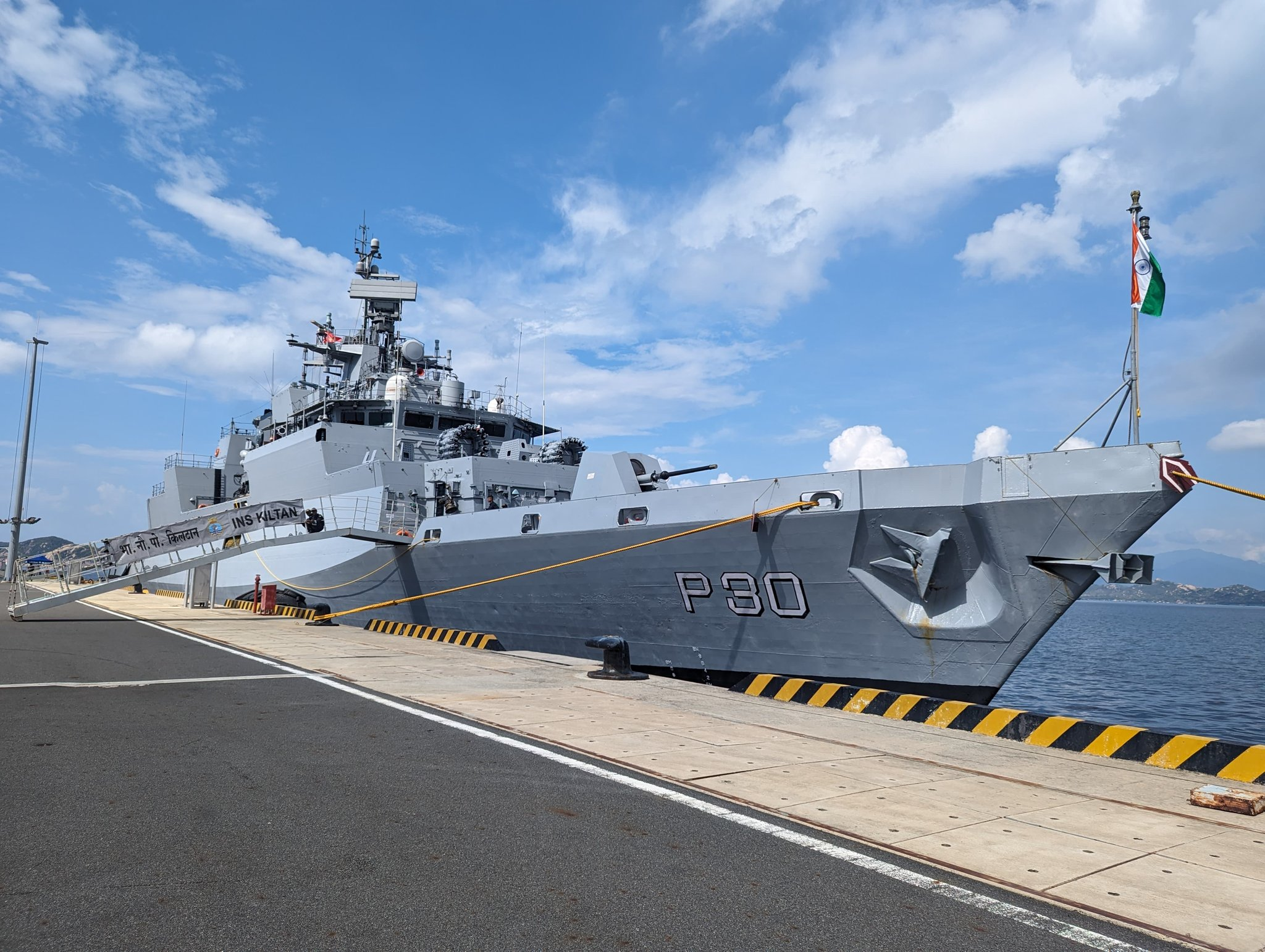
Kiltan (P30) at Cam Ranh Bay Port, Vietnam
