= Kamorta-class corvette =

Indian anti-submarine warship class

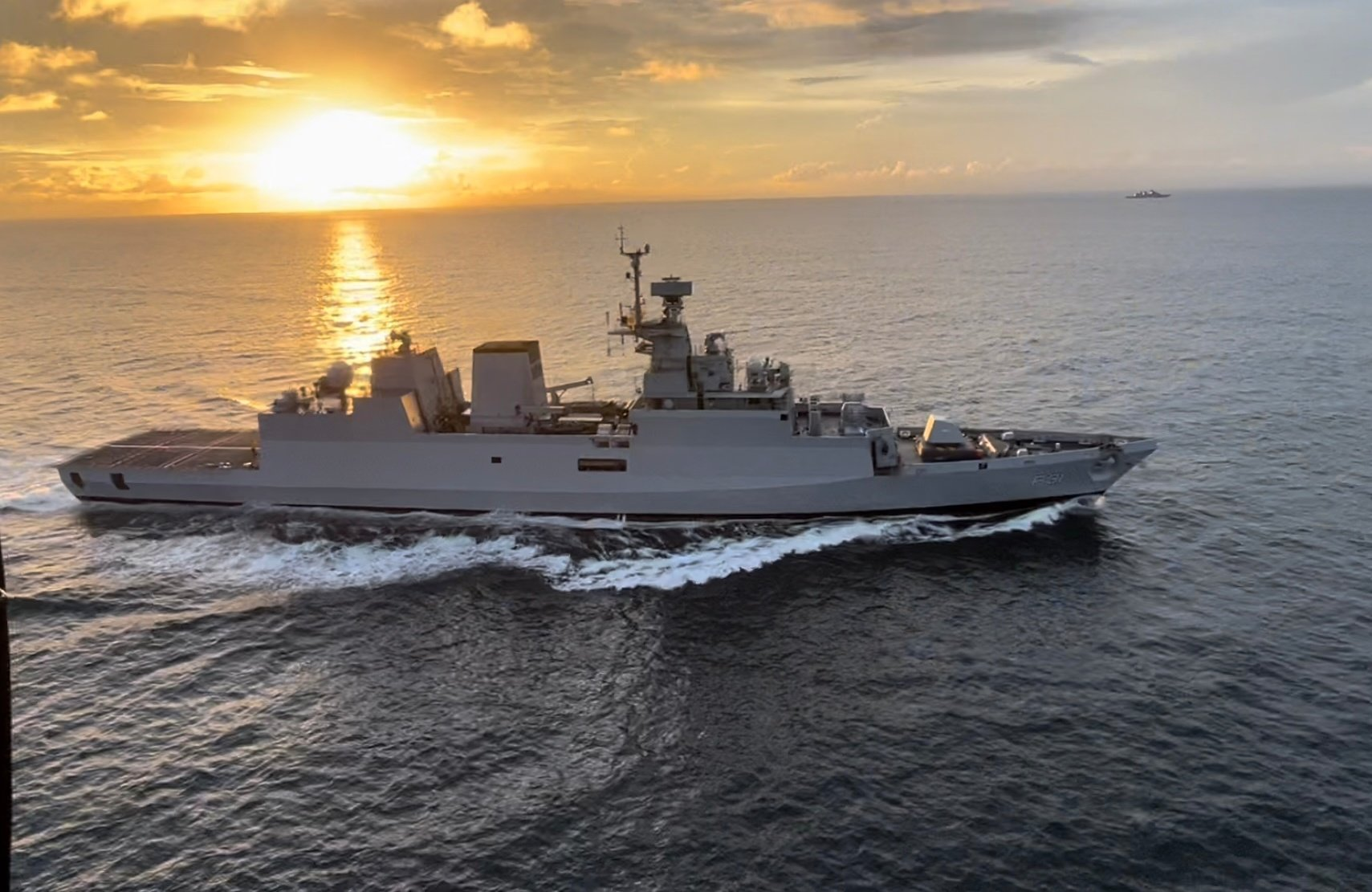
- INS Kavaratti (P31) on patrol

Class overview
- Name: Kamorta class
- Builders: Garden Reach Shipbuilders and Engineers
- Operators: Indian Navy
- Preceded by: Kora class by precedence; Abhay class by role
- Succeeded by: ASW SWC class
- Cost: ₹7,800 crore (equivalent to ₹130 billion or US$1.4 billion in 2026) for four ships (FY 2015); ₹1,950 crore (equivalent to ₹32 billion or US$340 million in 2026) per unit (FY 2015)
- Planned: 4
- Completed: 4
- Active: 4

General characteristics
- Type: Anti-submarine warfare corvette
- Displacement: 3,300 tonnes (3,200 long tons) full load
- Length: 109 m (357 ft 7 in)
- Beam: 13.7 m (44 ft 11 in)
- Installed power: 20,384 hp (15,200 kW)
- Propulsion: CODAD: 4 × Pielstick 12PA 6 STC6 Diesel engines
- Speed: 25 knots (46 km/h; 29 mph)
- Range: 3,450 nautical miles (6,390 km; 3,970 mi)
- Complement: 123 (incl. 17 officers)
- Sensors & processing systems: Revati Central Acquisition Radar; EL/M-2221 STGR fire-control radar; BEL Shikari; NPOL HUMSA (Hull Mounted Sonar Array); Bomber Electronic warfare (EW) suites - BEL Ajanta
- Electronic warfare & decoys: Sanket electronic warfare system; Kavach decoy launcher; CMS-28 combat management system
- Armament: Anti-air weaponry: 1 × OTO Melara 76 mm Super Rapid Gun Mount (SRGM)-Manufactured by BHEL; 2 x AK-630M CIWS; 32 × VL-SRSAM (planned); Anti-submarine warfare: 2 × RBU-6000 (IRL) anti-submarine rocket launcher; 2 x twin 533 mm torpedo tubes (Varunastra)
- Aircraft carried: 1 × Ka-28PL or HAL Dhruv
- Aviation facilities: Rail-less helo traversing system and foldable hangar door

The Kamorta-class corvettes or Project 28 are a class of anti-submarine warfare corvettes currently in service with the Indian Navy. Built at Garden Reach Shipbuilders & Engineers (GRSE), Kolkata, they are the first anti-submarine warfare stealth corvettes to be built in India. Project 28 was approved in 2003, with construction of the lead ship, INS Kamorta commencing on 12 August 2005. All of the four corvettes, INS Kamorta, INS Kadmatt, INS Kiltan and INS Kavaratti were commissioned in 2014, 2016, 2017 and 2020 respectively.

The platform and major internal systems of this class of corvettes are indigenously designed and built. The corvettes are named after the islands in the Lakshadweep archipelago. The Kamorta-class corvettes are intended to succeed the Kora class by precedence and the Abhay class by role.

== Design and description ==
In 2003, under the code name Project 28, the Indian Navy placed an order for four anti-submarine warfare (ASW) corvettes. The corvette's design was originally planned to be based on the Russian corvette Project 2038.2, however the basic design was later provided by the Indian Navy's Directorate of Naval Design, followed by the detailed design by Garden Reach Ship Builders and Engineers (GRSE). The design includes many stealth ship features, including reductions in acoustic signature and vibration of the vessels.

The class incorporates some major features including but not limited to the X-shaped hull form to improve stealth, a raft-mounted propulsion system to reduce vibration, and an infrared signature suppression system. It also includes networks such as the Total Atmospheric Control System (TACS), Integrated Platform Management System (IPMS), Integrated Bridge System (IBS), Battle Damage Control System (BDCS) and Personnel Locator System (PLS). The ships also include technology that enables them to fight in nuclear, biological and chemical warfare (NBC) scenarios. The Indian Navy claims that the indigenisation achieved in these ships is about 90%.

=== General characteristics and propulsion ===
The overall length of the Kamorta-class corvettes is 109 metres (357 ft 7 in), and the beam spans 13.7 m (44 ft 11 in). The ships displace about 2,500 tonnes (2,500 long tons) at standard load and 3,500 tonnes (3,400 long tons) when fully loaded. Each ship retains a complement of 180 sailors and 13 officers.

They are propelled by four Pielstick 12 PA6 STC diesel engines, each with a power of 5,096 horsepower (3,800 kW) in CODAD configuration. They also have two controllable pitch propellers which helps the ship achieve maximum speeds in excess of 25 knots (46 km/h; 29 mph).

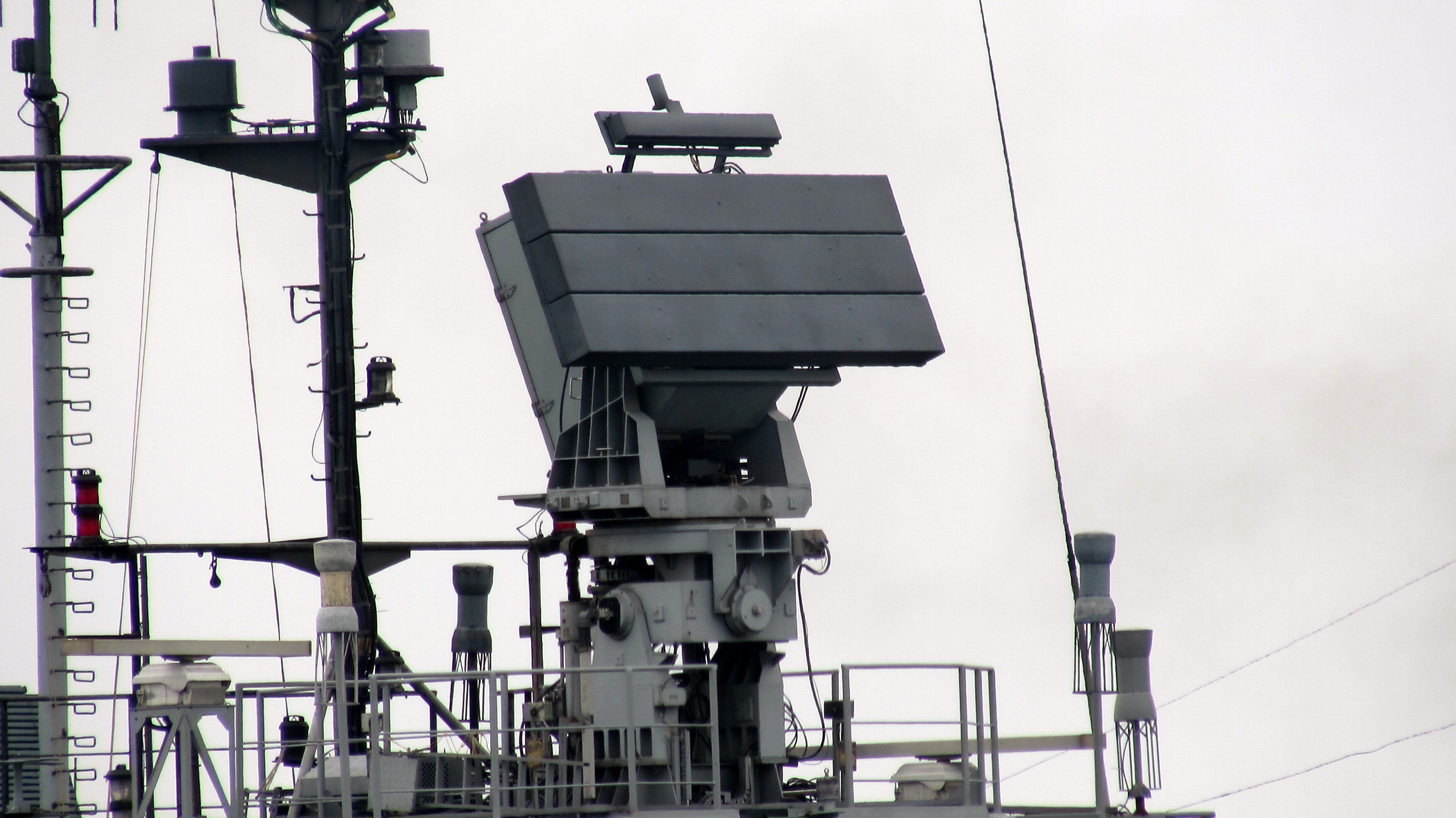
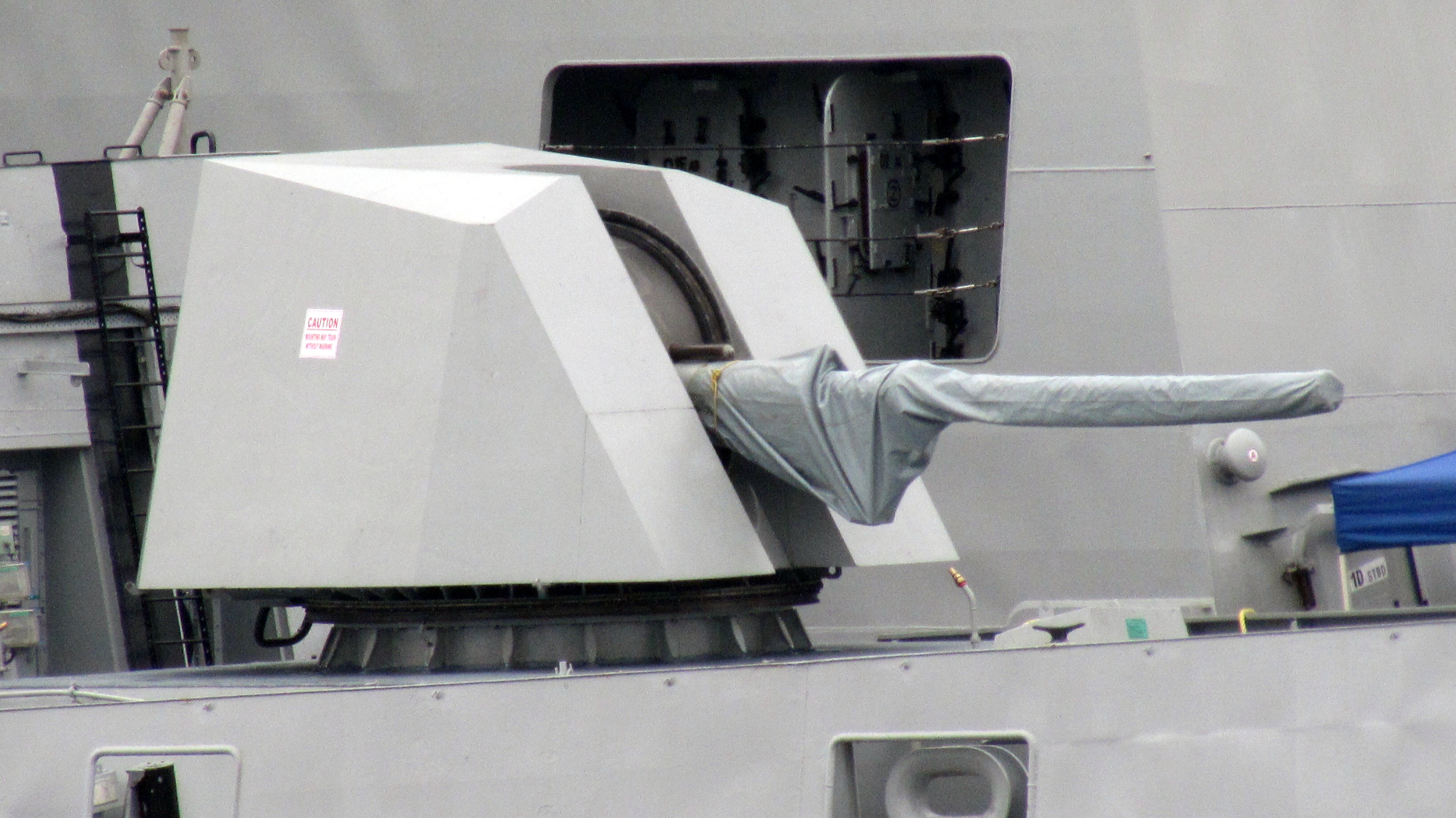
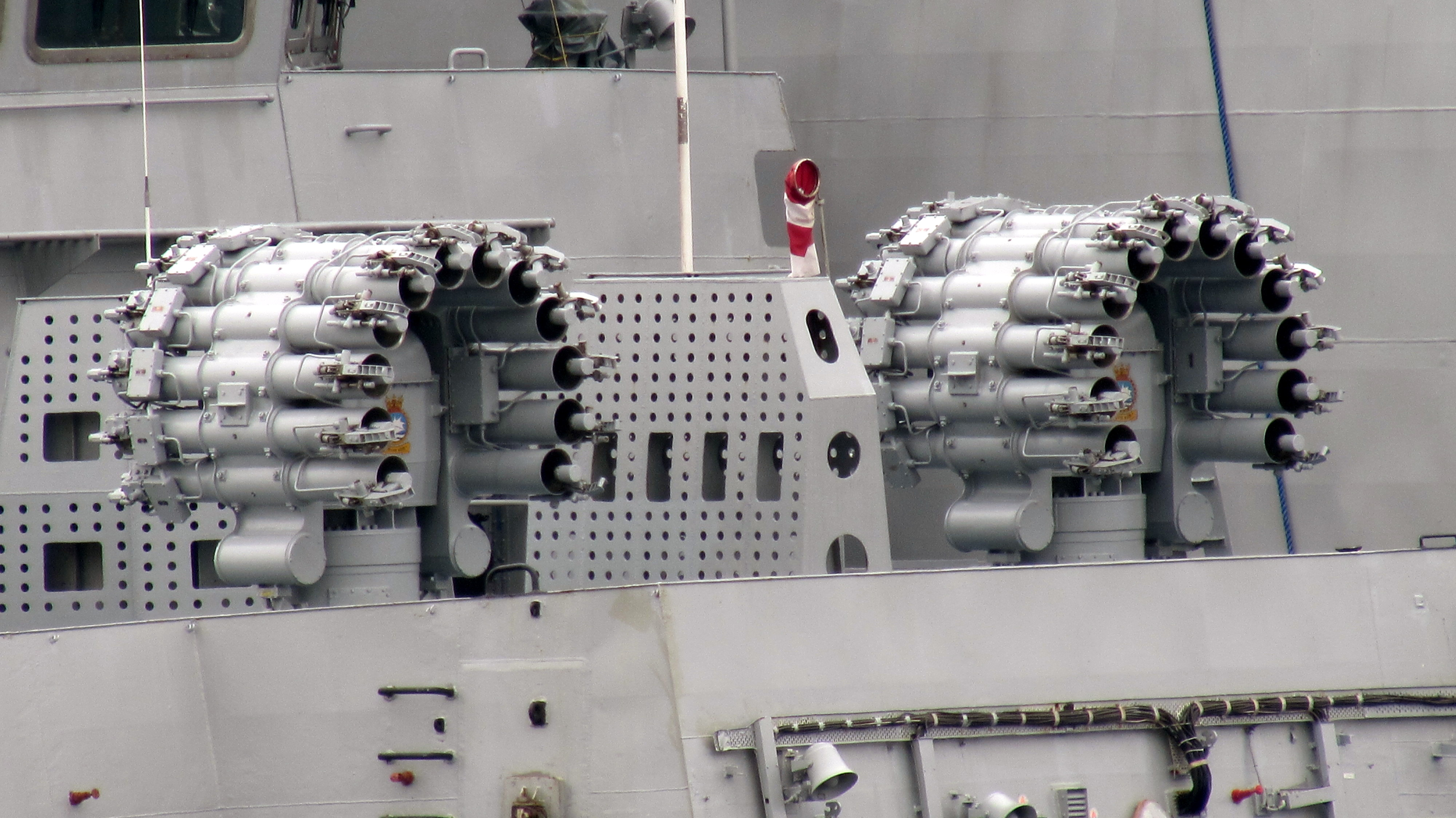
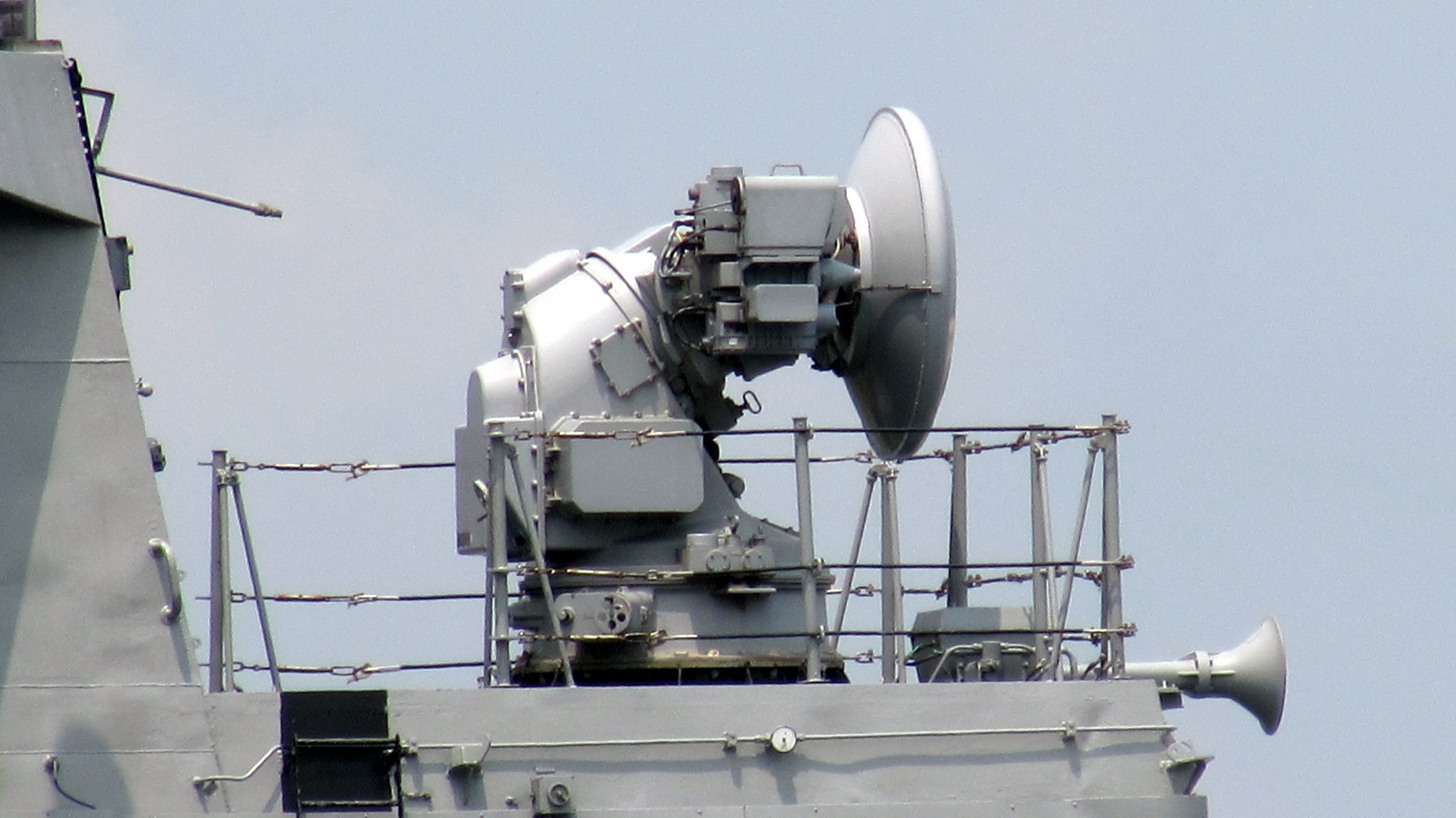
Weapons and sensors fitment on the Kamorta class.
(top) BEL Revathi radar, OTO Melara 76 mm SRGM, L&T RBU-6000 ASW rocket launcher and BEL Lynx U1 fire-control radar.

=== Electronics and sensors ===
The Kamorta-class corvettes boast a wide variety of sensors. Given below are the list of known sensors in the corvette:

- BEL Revathi 3-D E/F-band radar
- BEL HUMSA-NG bow-mounted sonar
- BEL Lynx U1 fire-control radar
- IAC Mod C fire-control system
- 1 × Atlas Elektronik towed array sonar (to be fitted)

=== Armament ===
The armament of the class includes a license-built OTO Melara 76 mm Super Rapid Gun in a stealth mount and a weapons layout similar to what is found on the Talwar-class and Shivalik-class frigates, two Larsen & Toubro (L&T) built derivatives of the RBU-6000 anti-submarine rocket launcher, as well as two of L&T's twin 533 mm torpedo tube launchers equipped with Varunastra torpedoes, and a pair of AK-630M close-in weapon system (CIWS). The fire-control system is the Bharat Electronics IAC Mod C system.

There is an option to include surface-to-air missiles. As of 2022, Indian Navy is planning to integrate VL-SRSAM. The corvette can hold one helicopter, which currently is a Westland Sea King Mk.42B helicopter.

== Construction ==
The order for four Kamorta-class corvettes were placed in 2003 by the Indian Navy. Construction of the lead ship, INS Kamorta began in the year 2005 and the keel was laid down in 2006 at GRSE, Kolkata. The ship was launched in the year 2010 and was inducted into the navy in 2014 after a series of delays. Construction of the second ship, INS Kadmatt followed and the keel was laid in 2007. The corvette was launched in 2011 and was inducted in the early 2016. INS Kiltan was laid down in 2010 and launched in 2013. While the last ship of its class, INS Kavaratti was laid down in 2012 and launched in 2015. Both the ships were commissioned in 2017 and 2020 respectively.

The project's objective was to enhance localization and development of warship construction industry in India. The navy asked the Indian industries to deliver equipment of higher sophistication levels than usual. This led to some unforeseen delays in the product delivery, and struggles perfecting the products.

All the ships of this class are built using DMR 249A special grade high-tensile steel, produced by the state-owned Steel Authority of India Limited (SAIL), and carbon fiber reinforced plastic (CFRP) materials. The main machinery is raft mounted, and each gear unit and its associated engines are mounted on a common raft. The diesel engines are license built by Kirloskar under SEMT Pielstick of France. DCNS supplies the noise-suppressing raft-mounted gearbox for CODAD propulsion. Wärtsilä India manufactures the low-vibration diesel alternators to power the on-board electronics.

The ships also includes an integrated ship management system (ISMS) from L-3 MAPPS which combines an integrated platform management system and bridge management system into a single integrated system.

INS Kiltan and INS Kavaratti are to be more advanced than their elder ships. In a first, composite materials, imported from Kockums, Sweden, are used for the construction of the superstructures. This resulted in increased stealth features, reduced weight relative to typical superstructures built with steel, anti-corrosive and fire resistant. It's also projected for the ships to have some additional armament and new features.

The last ship of the class Kavaratti was commissioned by Indian Army's COAS General Manoj Mukund Naravane on 22 October 2020.

== Ships of the class ==
All the ships names of the class are reincarnations of ships from the previous Arnala-class corvettes which are considered to be the spiritual predecessors of the Kamorta class.

Name	Pennant	Laid down	Launched	Commissioned	Status
Indian Navy
Kamorta	P 28	20 November 2006	19 April 2010	23 August 2014	Active
Kadmatt	P 29	27 September 2007	25 October 2011	7 January 2016	Active
Kiltan	P 30	10 August 2010	26 March 2013	16 October 2017	Active
Kavaratti	P 31	20 January 2012	19 May 2015	22 October 2020	Active

== Export ==
=== Failed bids ===
==== Philippines ====
Under the Frigate Acquisition Project, the Philippine Navy sought to purchase two light frigates, each displacing 2,600 tonnes (2,600 long tons), spanning 109 m (357 ft 7 in) in length, capable of cruising at 25 knots (46 km/h; 29 mph) and be able to sail in sea state 7. In the bidding process, GRSE was selected as the lowest bidder among the contenders next to Daewoo Shipbuilding & Marine Engineering, Hyundai Heavy Industries and Navantia in 2016. The deal was said to cost more than ₹2,157 crore (equivalent to ₹31 billion or US$336 million in 2026).

Based on a post qualification assessment, GRSE was disqualified on the grounds of not meeting the financial capability requirements. A heavily modified version of the Korean Incheon-class frigate, known as the Jose Rizal class, built by Hyundai Heavy Industries was eventually chosen in 2018.

==== Brazil ====
In June 2018, GRSE submitted its proposal for the Brazilian Navy's Tamandaré-class future corvette program. GRSE offered a modified Kamorta class of 2,800 tonnes with weapons and sensors on par with its Philippines offer. The project was planned to be completed in Brazil's local shipyard for which GRSE teamed up with Sinergy Group Corporate for local production. Other conteders included Goa Shipyard Limited, BAE Systems, Damen, Fincantieri, Naval Group, ThyssenKrupp Marine Systems, Turkey’s STM, and Ukrinmash.

GRSE's proposal did not make the downselect in October 2018. A design by TKMS, based on the MEKO design, winning the contract with keel laying being reported in March 2023.

== Gallery ==
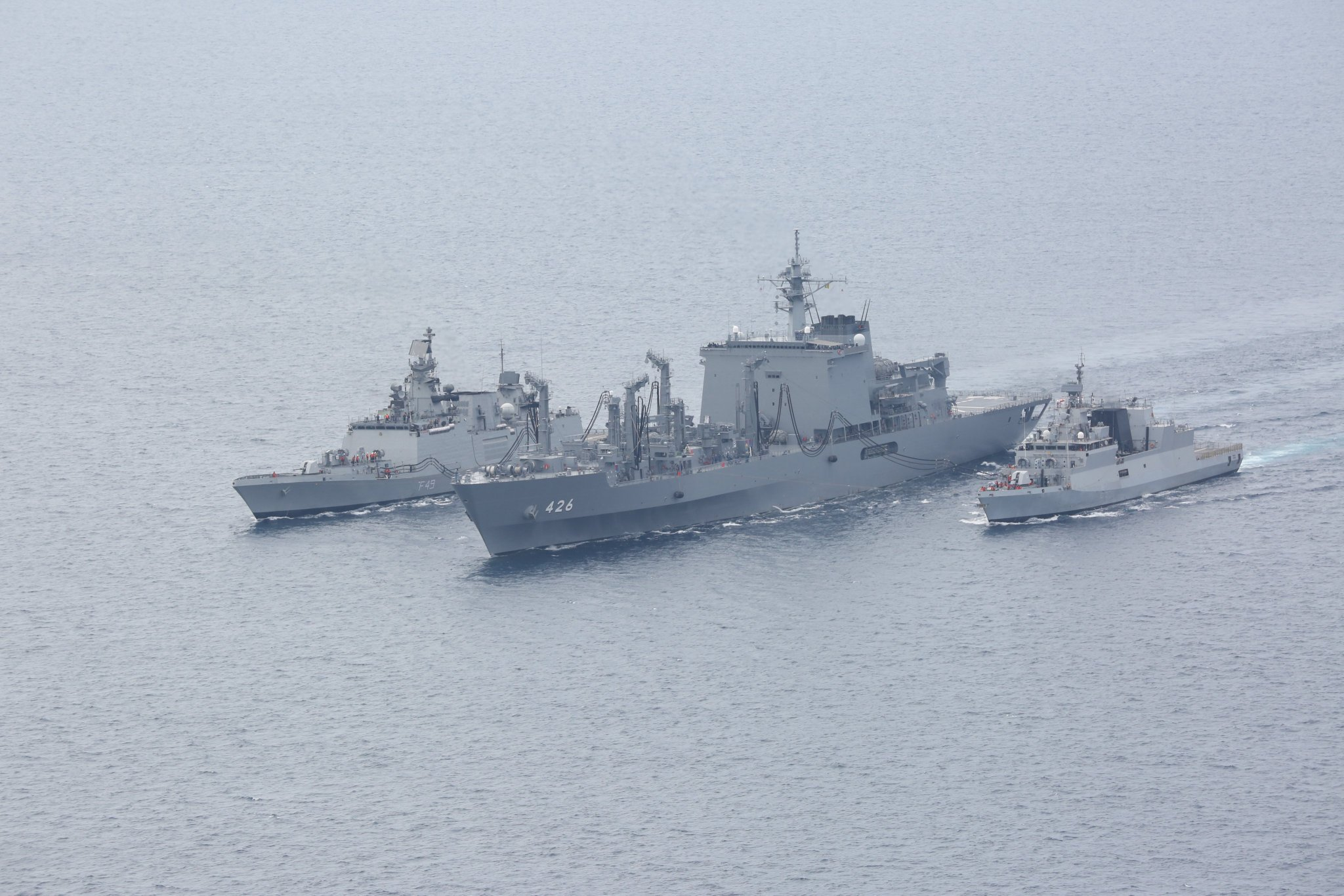
Sahyadri with JMSDF Ōmi and a Kamorta-class corvette during Malabar exercise.

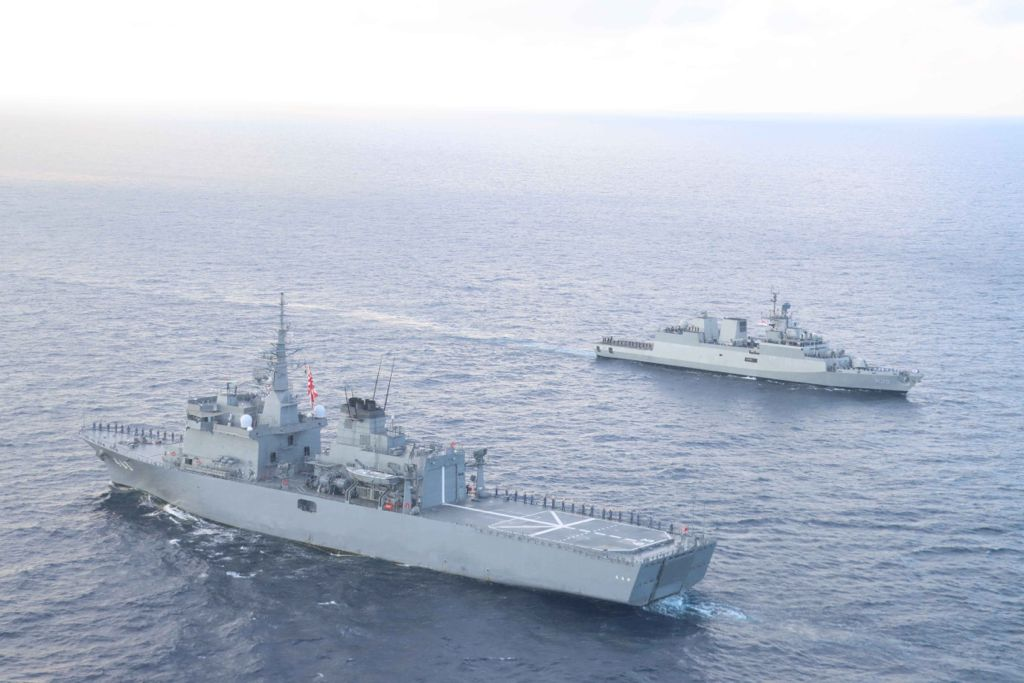
Kadmatt with Uraga during an exercise.

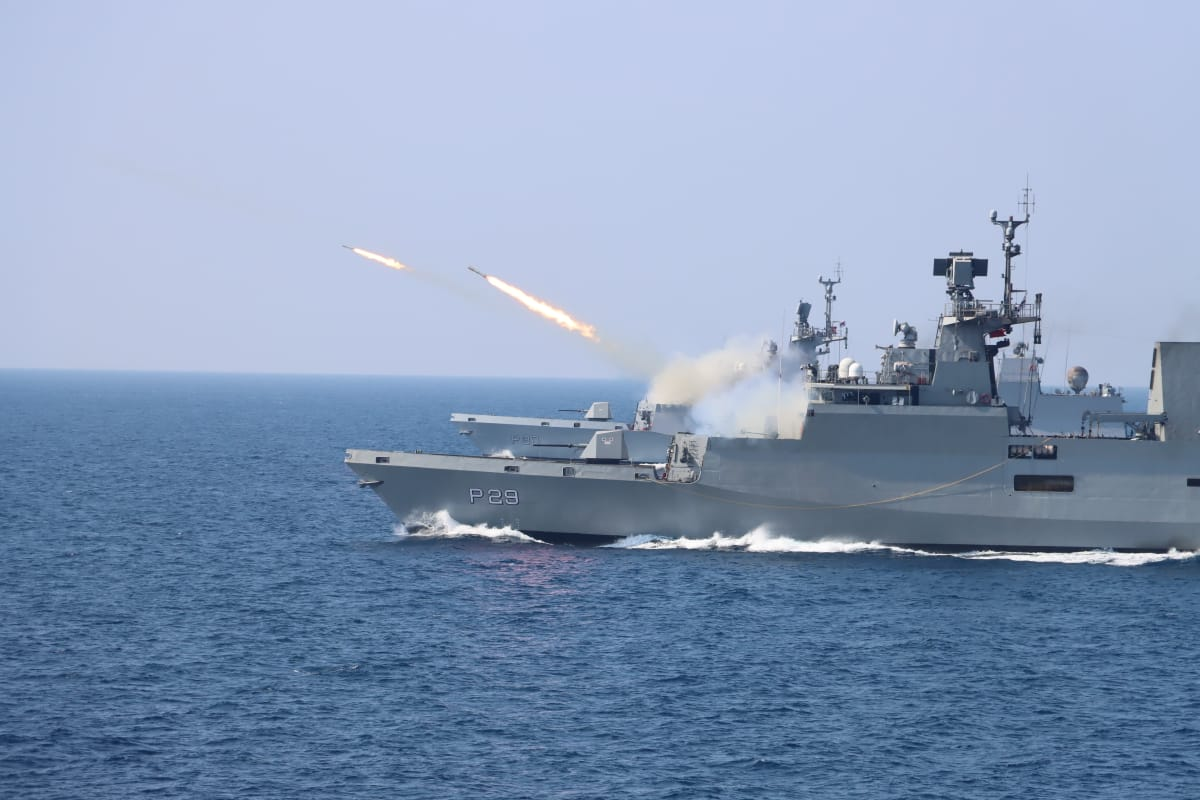
Kadmatt and Kiltan during anti-submarine firing drills.

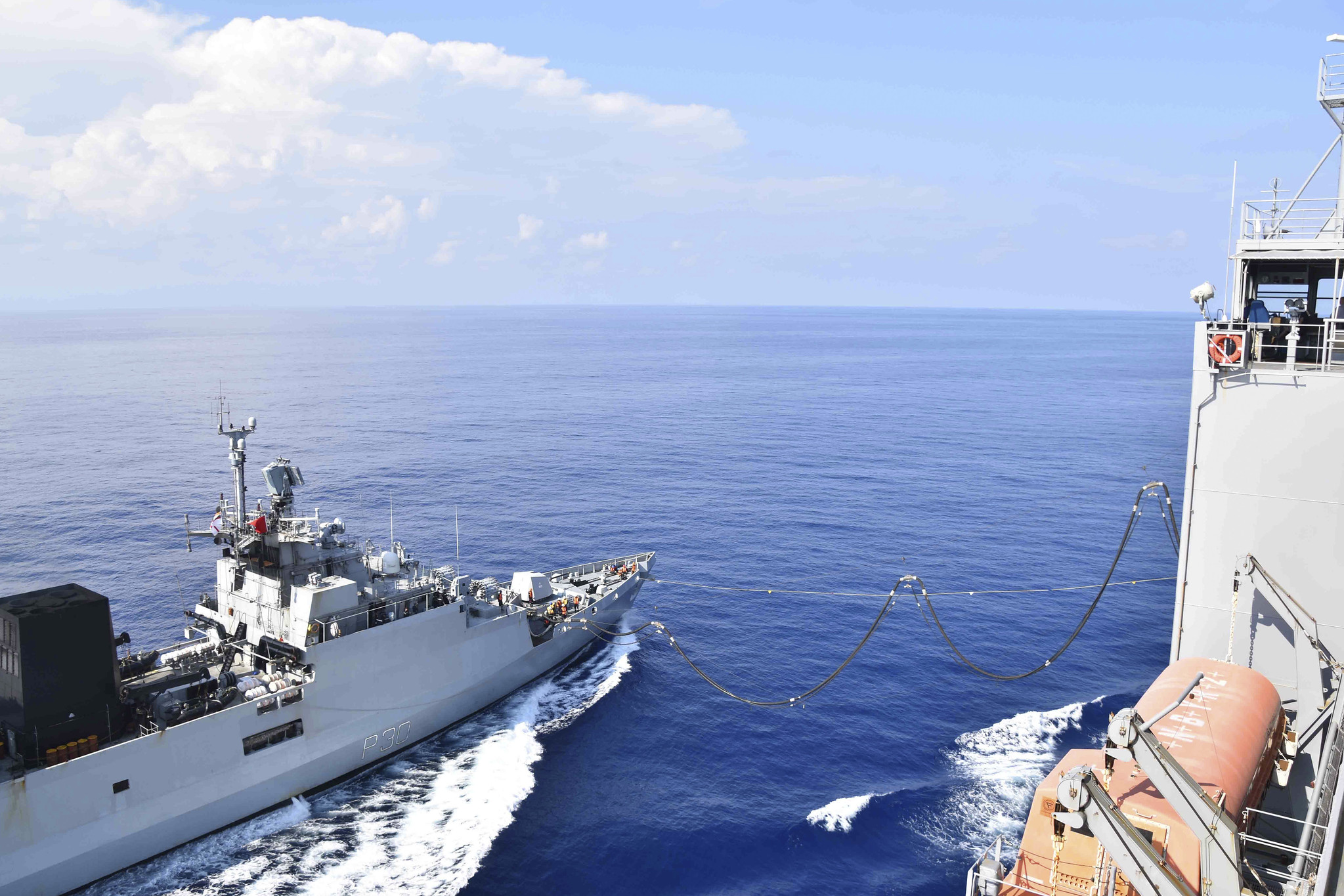
Kiltan replenishment at sea by Richard E. Byrd.

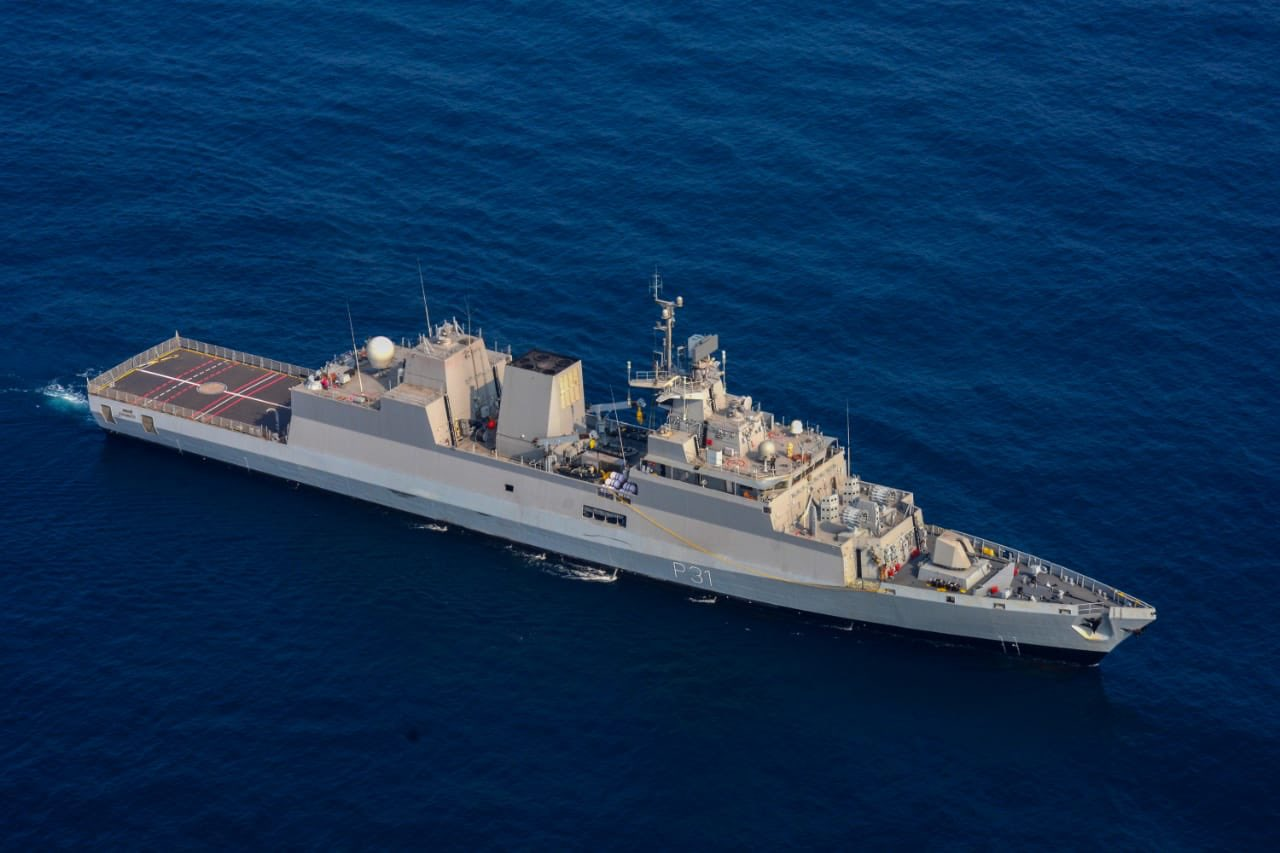
Kavaratti during trials

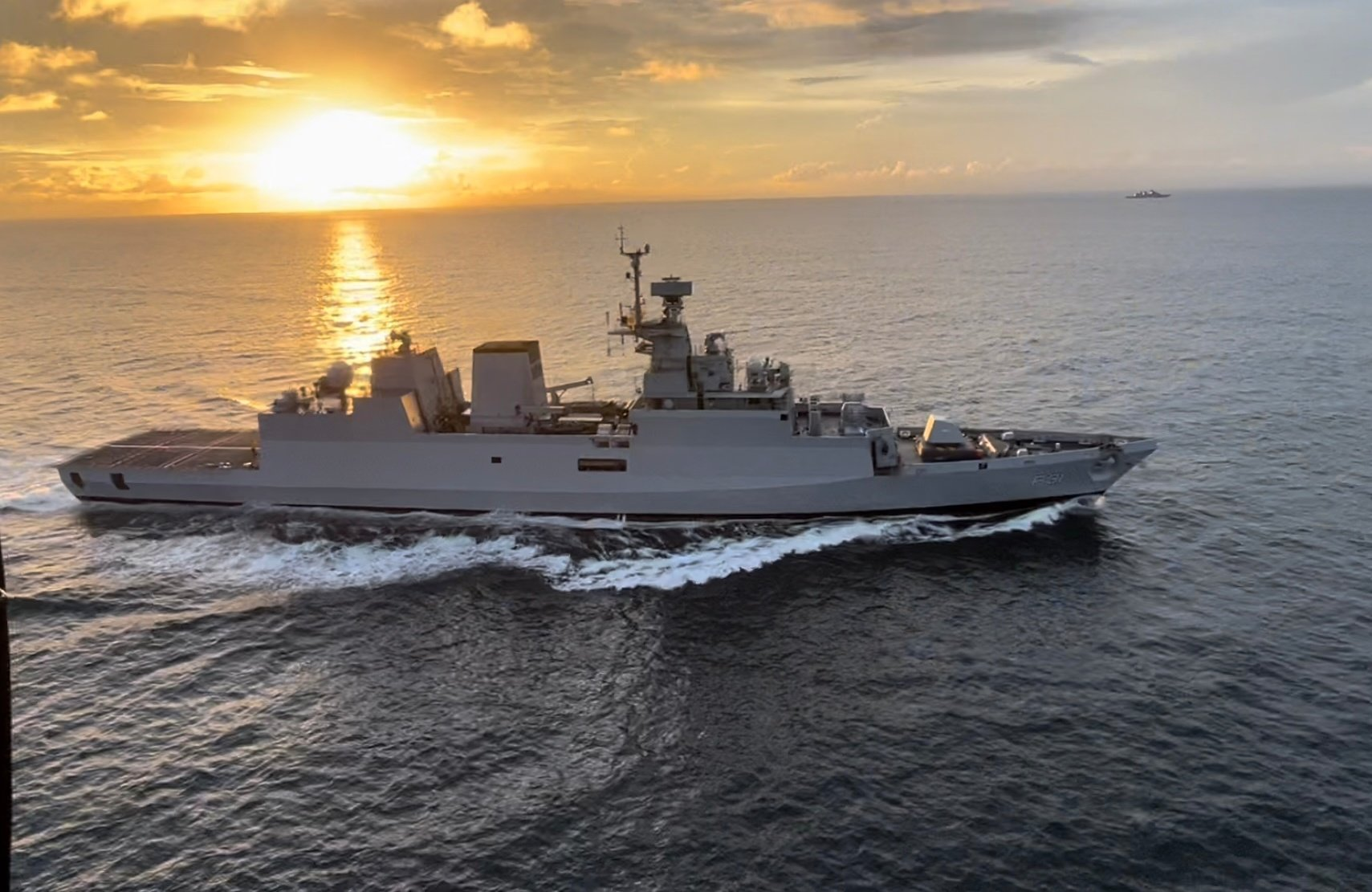
Kavaratti patrolling the Indian Ocean.

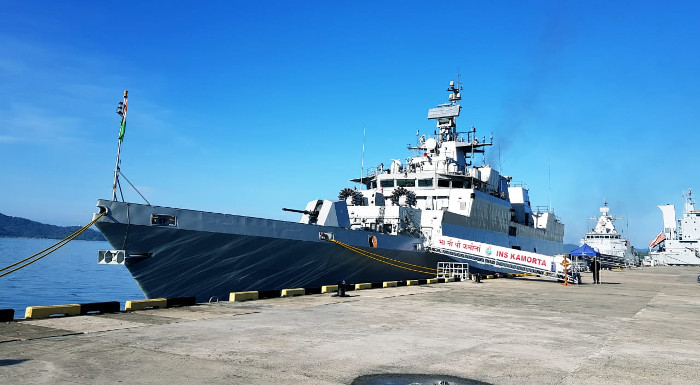
Kamorta visits Kota Kinabalu, Malaysia

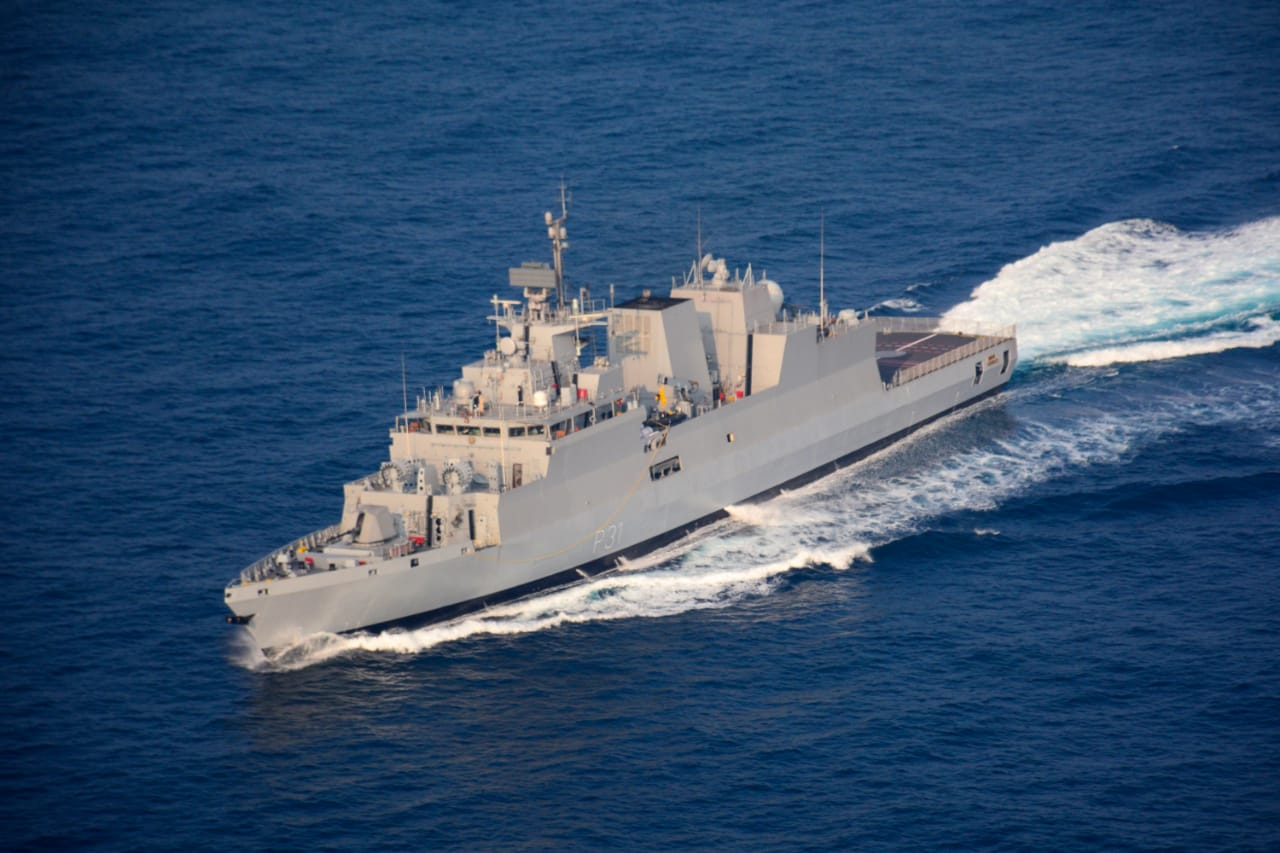
Kavaratti during trials

== See also ==
- List of active Indian Navy ships
- Future ships of the Indian Navy

=== Equivalent modern corvettes ===
- Diponegoro class – (Netherlands)
- Steregushchiy class – (Russia)
- Braunschweig class – (Germany)
- Ada class – (Turkey)
- Sa'ar 6 class – (Israel)
- Pohjanmaa class – (Finland)
