= INS Kamorta (P28) =

Indian navy anti-submarine corvette

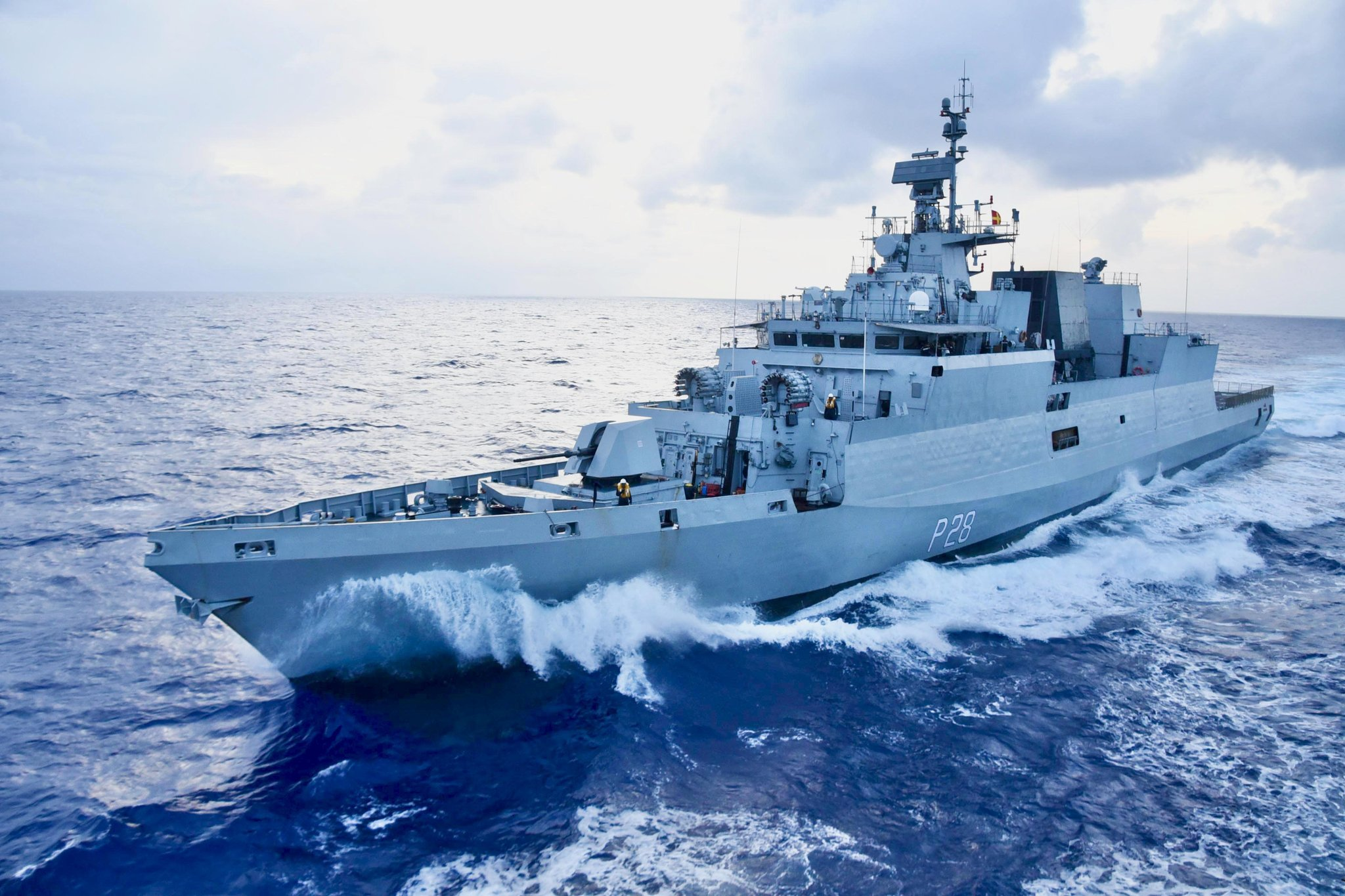
- Kamorta (P28) at sea

History

Indian Navy
- Name: Kamorta
- Namesake: Kamorta Island
- Operator: Indian Navy
- Builder: Garden Reach Shipbuilders and Engineers
- Cost: ₹2,800 crore (US$291 million)
- Laid down: 20 November 2006
- Launched: 19 April 2010
- Acquired: 12 July 2014
- Commissioned: 23 August 2014
- Identification: Pennant number: P28
- Status: Active
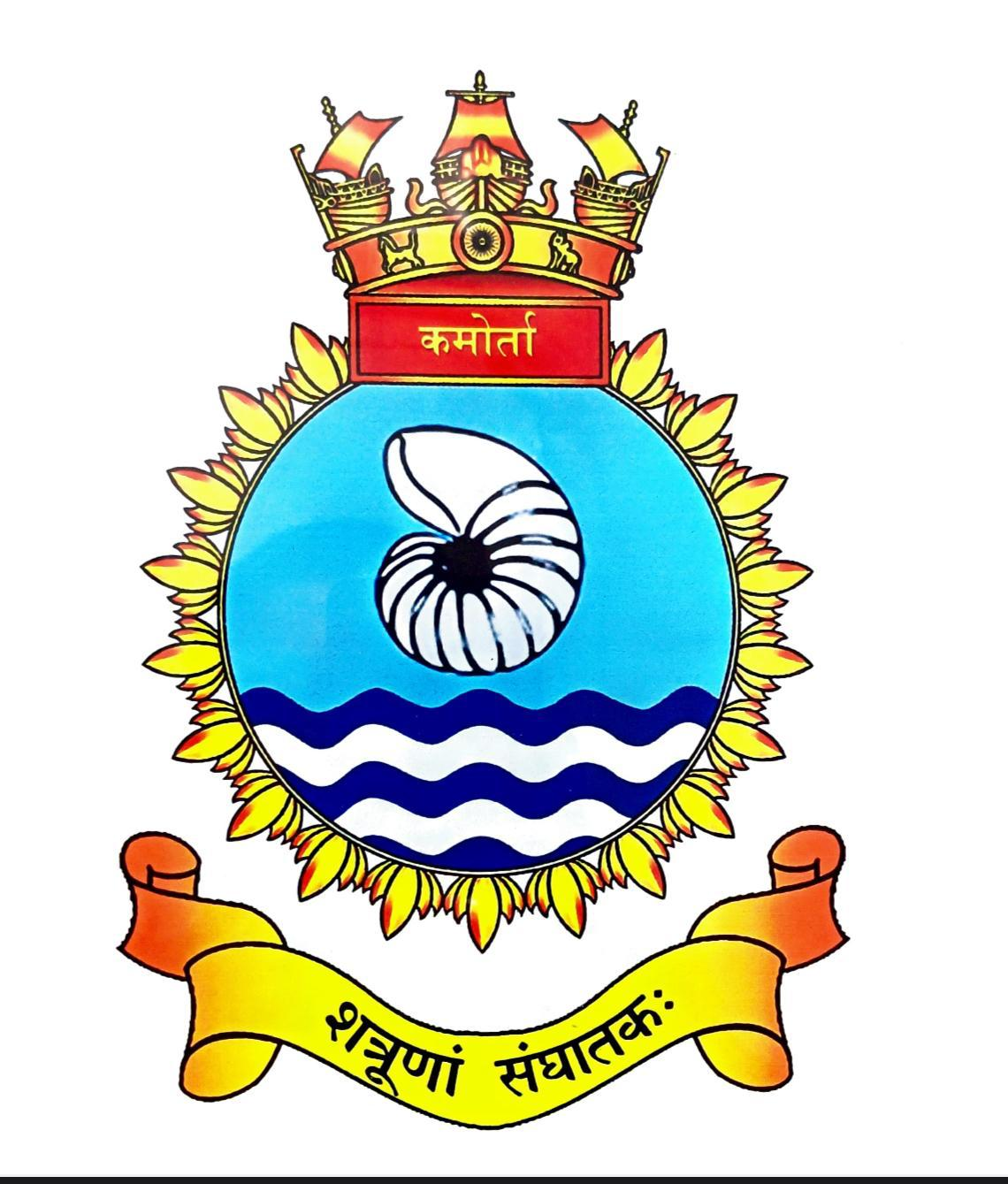
- Badge

General characteristics
- Class & type: Kamorta-class ASW corvette
- Displacement: 3,500 tonnes.
- Length: 109.1 m
- Beam: 13.7 m
- Propulsion: 4 × Pielstick 12 PA6 STC Diesel engines; CODAD, DCNS raft mounted gearbox
- Speed: 32 knots (59 km/h; 37 mph)
- Complement: 123 (17 officers)
- Sensors & processing systems: Revati Central Acquisition Radar; EL/M-2221 STGR fire-control radar; BEL Shikari; BEL RAWL02 (Signaal LW08) antenna communication grid – Gigabit Ethernet-based integrated ship borne data network, with a fiber optic cable backbone running through the vessel; NPOL HUMSA (Hull Mounted Sonar Array); Bomber Electronic warfare (EW) suites – BEL Ajanta
- Electronic warfare & decoys: Sanket electronic warfare system; Kavach decoy launcher; CMS-28 combat management system
- Armament: Anti-air weaponry: 1 X OTO Melara 76 mm Super Rapid Gun Mount (SRGM); 2 x AK-630M CIWS; To be outfitted with VL-SRSAM; Anti-submarine warfare: 2 X IRL anti-submarine rocket launcher; 2x4 Torpedo tubes
- Aircraft carried: 1 Westland Sea King Mk.42B
- Aviation facilities: Rail-less helo traversing system and foldable hangar door

INS Kamorta is the first of four anti-submarine Kamorta-class stealth corvettes which has been built for the Indian Navy.

She was designed and manufactured by Garden Reach Shipbuilders & Engineers (GRSE), launched on 19 April 2010, as part of Project 28, approved in 2003. The ship was named after Kamorta island in Andaman and Nicobar, India .

== Design and description ==
Kamorta was originally expected to be built using high-tensile imported steel. But as the INS Shivalik, was built, high-grade steel produced in India was utilized for its construction. It was built using high-grade steel (DMR249A) developed by the state-owned Steel Authority of India from its Bhilai Steel Plant. She has enhanced stealth features such as an X Form Hull and inclined sides for low radar cross-section, infrared suppression, and acoustic quieting systems. She is the first Indian Navy ship to be built with carbon fiber reinforced plastic which reduces weight and life cycle maintenance costs. The hull of the ship encompassed the bulk of sensors and weapon systems that were also indigenously manufactured by various Indian industries.

It is the first indigenous anti-submarine corvette as well as the first indigenous stealth corvette built by India. About 90% of the ship is indigenous and the ship is capable of fighting in NBC conditions. It is equipped with a rail-less helo traversing system which is used for handling a helicopter. It also features a foldable hangar door.

=== General characteristics and propulsion ===
Kamorta will have a length of 109 m (358 ft) overall and a beam of 13.7 m (45 ft). The ships displace about 3,500 tonnes (3,900 short tons) at full load. It is powered by four 5,096 hp (3,800 kW) diesel engines at 1,050 rpm

It uses four Pielstick 12 PA6 STC diesel engines in CODAD configuration and is propelled two two-shaft, controllable-pitch propellers which allow the ship to reach a top speed of 32 kn (59 km/h; 37 mph). It will have a complement of about 180 sailors and 15 officers excluding flight crew for the integral ASW helicopter and an endurance of 4,000 nmi (7,400 km; 4,600 mi).

As in INS Shivalik, high-grade steel produced in India was utilized for its construction. She was delivered to Navy on 12 July 2014. She is the first indigenous anti-submarine corvette as well as the first indigenous stealth corvette built by India. The then Minister of Defense, Arun Jaitley commissioned the ship on 23 August 2014.

==== Armament ====
Kamorta is equipped with a wide range of weapon systems. It is fitted with an OTO Melara 76 mm main gun, and uses two AK-630 guns and provision for 16-cell VLS launched Barak 1 missiles as close-in weapon system, which will be added later. In addition, 2 RBU-6000 anti-submarine rocket launchers and torpedo tubes capable of firing heavy weight torpedoes.

The sensors of this warship include the advanced bow mounted sonar and the indigenous 3D-CAR air-surveillance radar Revathi with capability to detect targets exceeding 200 km (120 mi). It is also the first warship to be equipped with the Kavach decoy system for protection against anti-ship missiles. Like INS Kolkata, this warship is also commissioned without the critical medium-range surface-to-air missile (SAM) and advanced light towed array sonars (ALTAS), which is planned to be added later.

== Construction and career ==
Kamorta was ordered in 2003 and was launched on 21 April 2010. It was expected to join the fleet in October 2012 but was handed over to the Navy on 12 July 2014.

On 12 July, the front line warship was formally handed over by GRSE chairman and managing director Rear Admiral A. K. Verma (Retd.) to the Navy at a ceremony in GRSE's fitting-out jetty She was commissioned into the Navy on 23 August 2014, with Commander Manoj Jha as her first captain.

A minor fire broke out on 1 February 2017 in the left engine room of the ship when it was operating at sea. The room was immediately evacuated, the fire was put out using the ship's fixed fire system, and there were no injuries during the incident.

On 20 June 2024, Kamorta arrived at the Port of Trincomalee, situated in Trincomalee, Sri Lanka, as part of a formal visit. Following the completion of the official engagement, the vessel departed from the island on 23 June 2024. On her departure, Kamorta engaged in a naval exercise with SLNS Samudura.

The ship participated in Exercise Malabar 2024 which was held from 8 to 18 October. She also participated at the International Fleet Review 2026 held at Visakapatanam.

Kamorta participated in the 33rd edition of SIMBEX, which was hosted by India from 21 to 26 October 2026. The harbour phase was held at Visakhapatnam until 23 October followed by the sea phase from 24 October in the Bay of Bengal. The exercise also included the participation of INS Nilgiri from the Indian Navy and RSS Supreme from the Republic of Singapore Navy. The air assets deployed in the exercise included an SH-70B helicopter with Supreme along with P-8I Neptune, Do-228 MPA, Hawk 132 and MH-60R helicopters of the Indian Naval Air Arm.

== Gallery ==
INS Kamorta images at sea
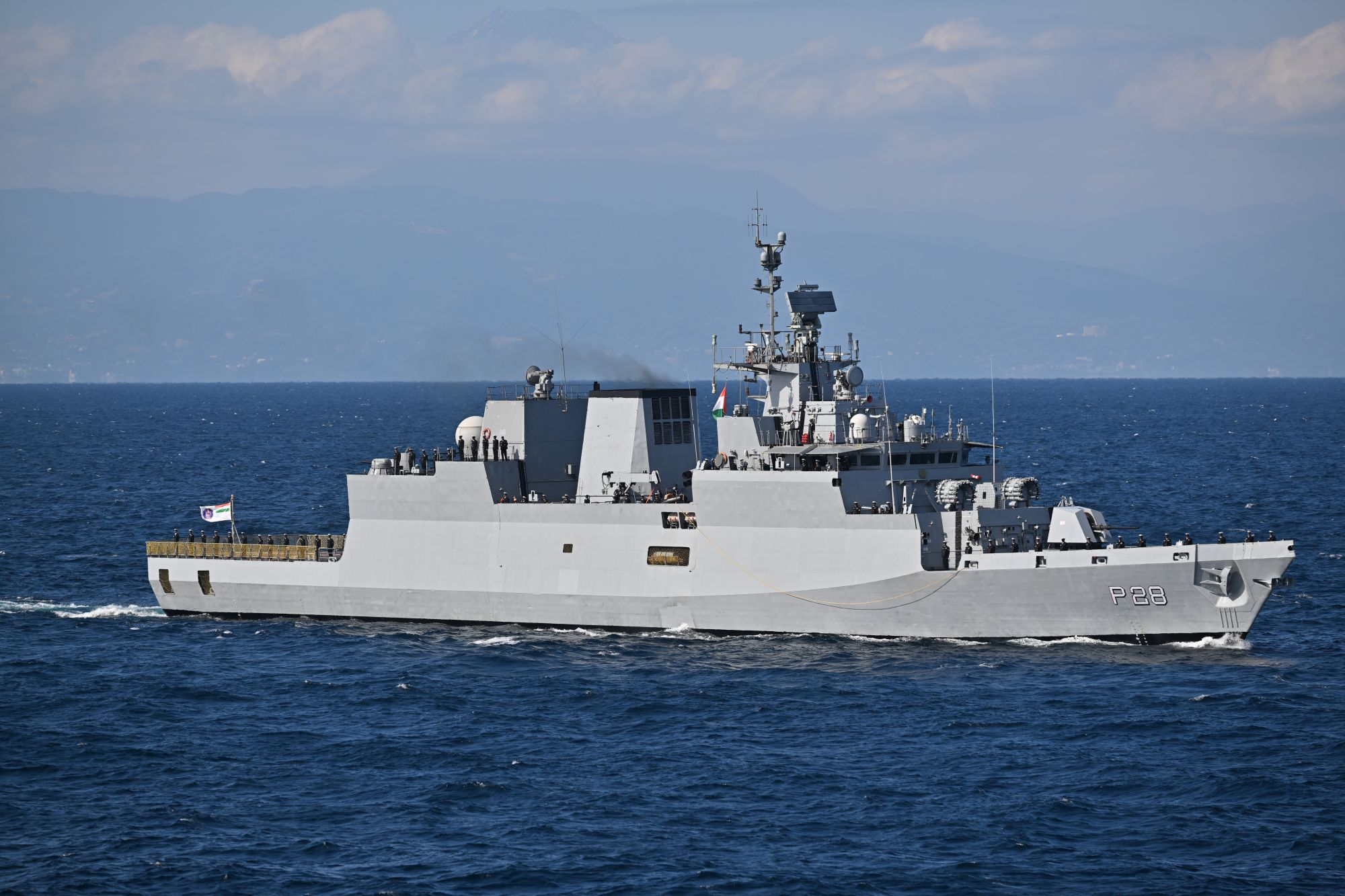
Kamorta (P28) participating in the International Fleet Review 2022

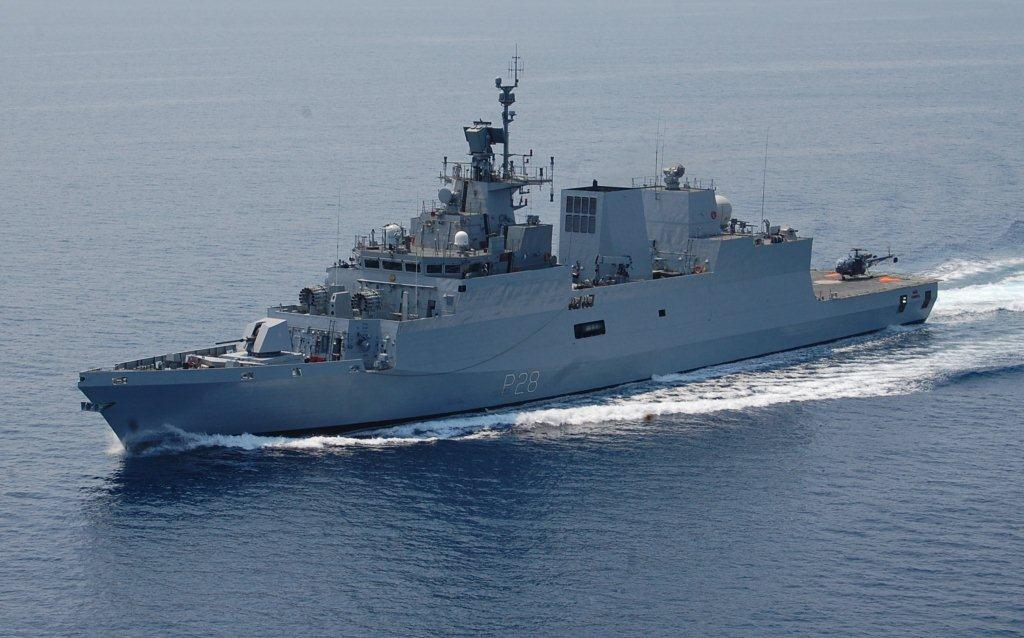
INS Kamorta during sea trials

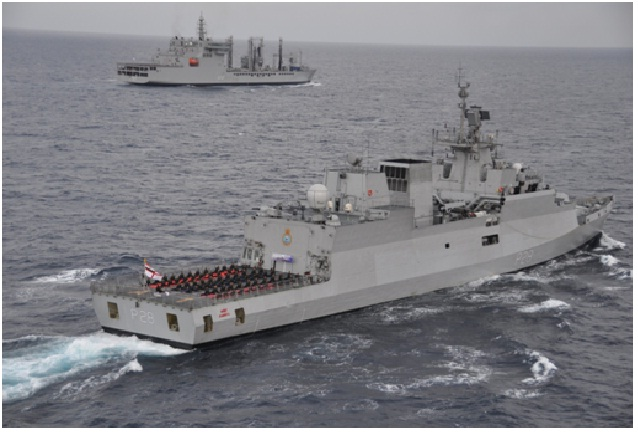
Yoga onboard INS Kamorta during International Yoga Day

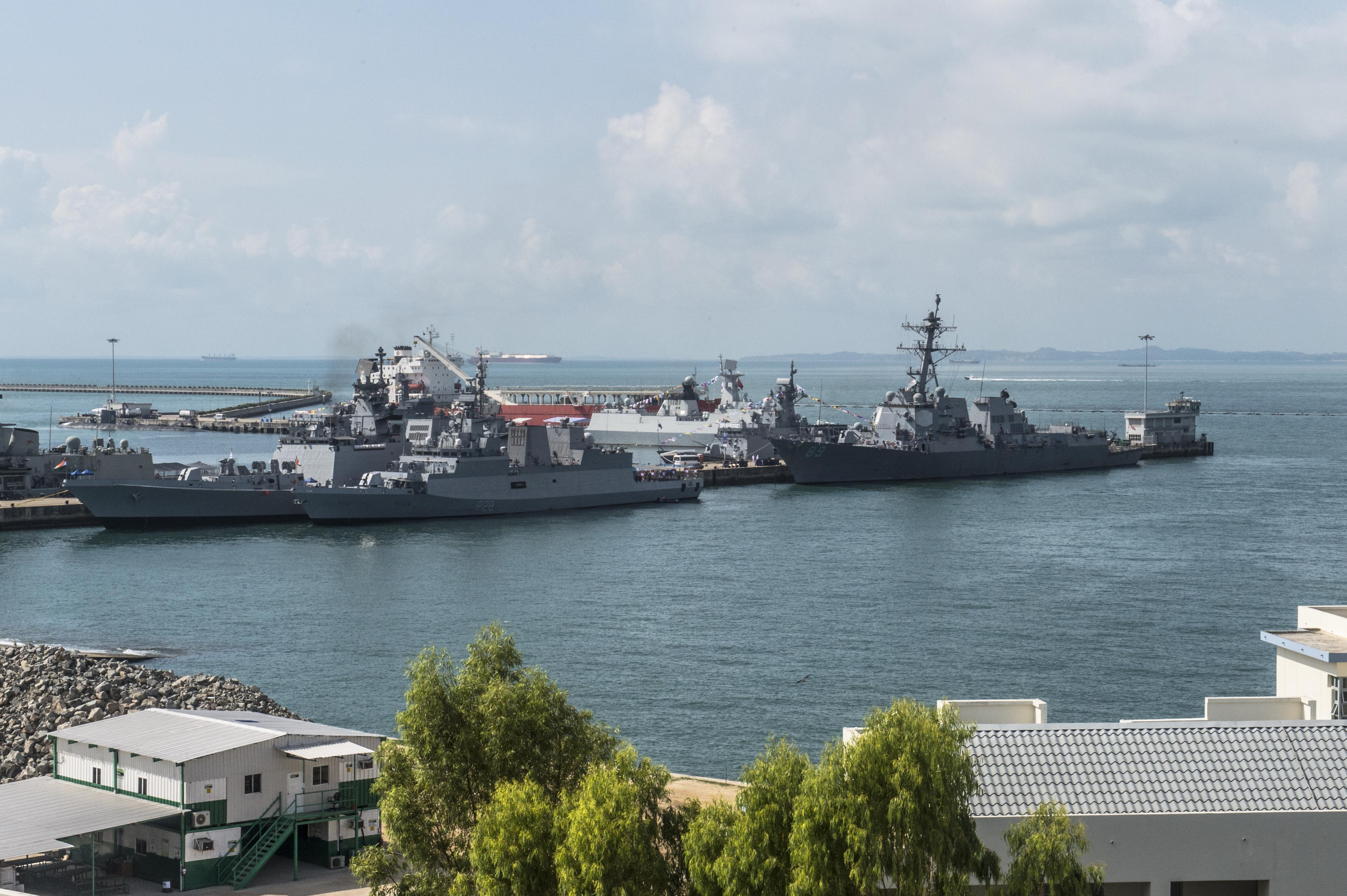
INS Satpura and INS Kamorta IMDEX 2015

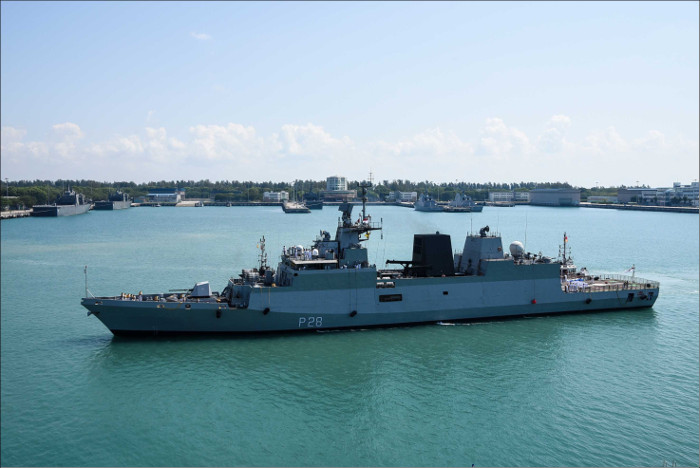
INS Kamorta entering Singapore Port.

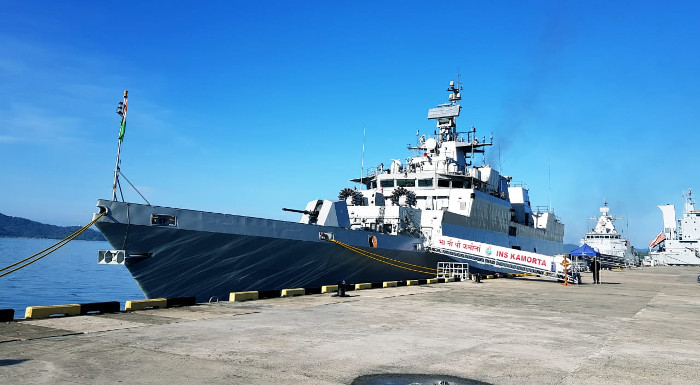
INS Kamorta visits Kota Kinabalu, Malaysia

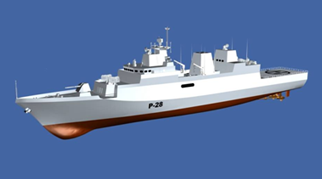
Indian Navy's computer generated design of the Project 28 Kamorta class corvette
