= IRL =

IRL or irl may refer to:

== Arts and media ==
- IRL (2013 film), a Swedish drama film about a high school student tormented by peers
- IRL (2019 film), an American drama film about "the ups and downs of online dating and modern dating"
- "IRL" (NCIS), a 2019 episode of NCIS
- IRL (album), a 2023 album by Mahalia
- "IRL", a 2025 song by Lizzo featuring SZA from the mixtape My Face Hurts from Smiling
- In Real Life (band), an American boy band

== Places ==
- Republic of Ireland (ISO 3166-1 alpha-3 code: IRL)
- Irlam railway station, England (National Rail code: IRL)

== Organizations ==
- International Rugby League, the international governing body of rugby league and its variants
- Ipswich Rugby League, a rugby league football competition
- Industrial Research Limited, New Zealand
- Indy Racing League, renamed IndyCar in 2012
- Institute for Research on Learning, United States (1986–2000)
- Institut Ramon Llull, promoting Catalan language and culture
- Isamaa ja Res Publica Liit, or Pro Patria and Res Publica Union, an Estonian political party

== Technology ==
- Internet resource locator, bank layers of security
- Inverse reinforcement learning, in machine learning

== Other uses ==
- In real life, a phrase separating reality from fiction or social media

== See also ==
- In Real Life (disambiguation)
