= Central acquisition radar (3D-CAR) =

Indian anti-aircraft radar

3-dimensional central acquisition radar (3D-CAR)
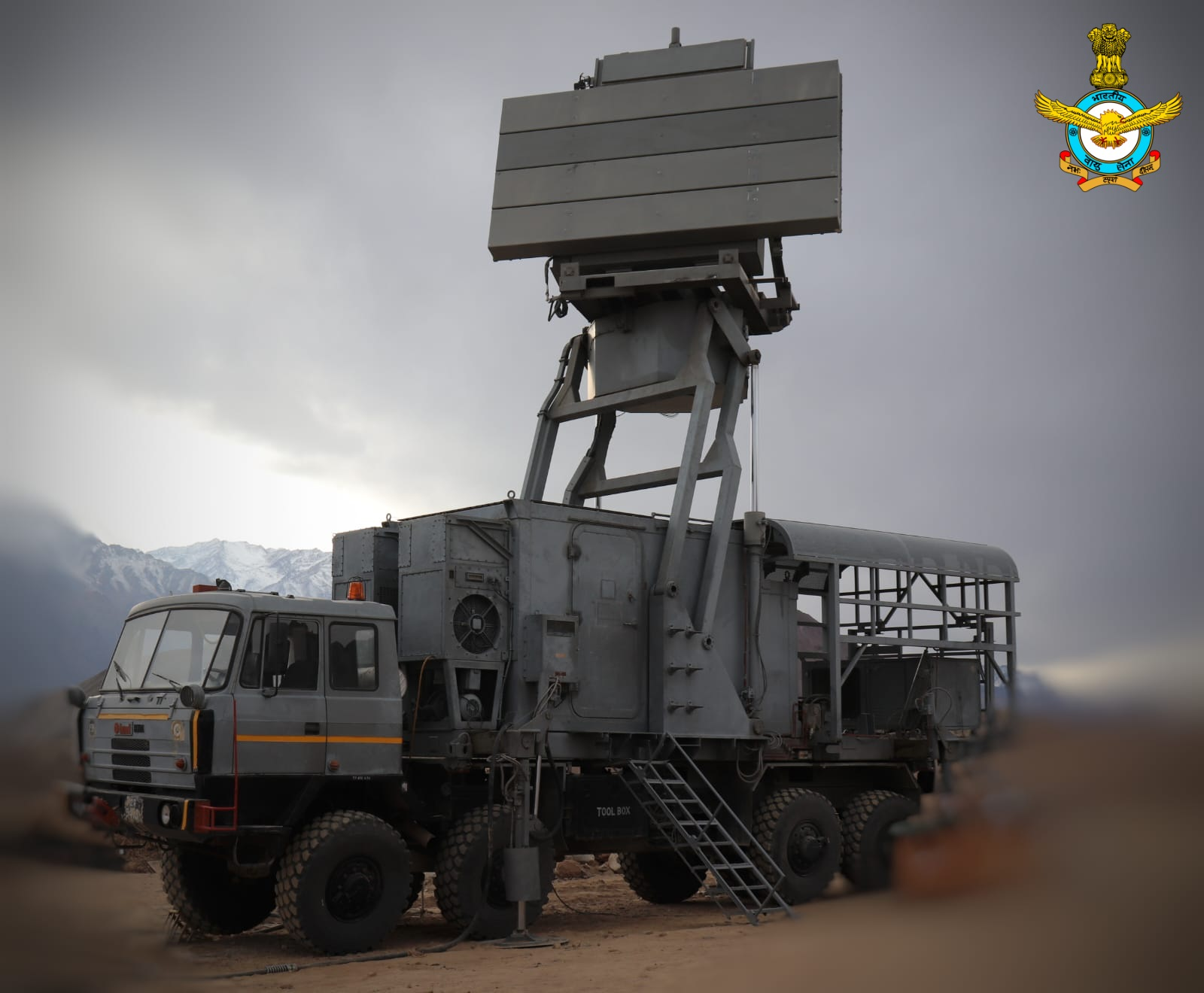
- Rohini radar of IAF
- Country of origin: India
- Manufacturer: Bharat Electronics Limited
- Designer: Electronics and Radar Development Establishment (DRDO)
- Type: Primary surveillance radar
- Frequency: S band
- Range: 185 km (115 mi)
- Altitude: 18 kilometres (11 mi)
- Azimuth: >±0.5°
- Elevation: 5 Mrad upto 100 Km
- Other names: ROHINI; REVATHI

The central acquisition radar (3D-CAR) is a 3D radar developed by the Defence Research and Development Organisation (DRDO) for use with Akash Surface-to-air missiles and is capable of tracking 150 targets.

== Details ==
The central acquisition radar (CAR) is a long-range high-resolution 3D surveillance radar. The entral acquisition radar was designed by Electronics and Radar Development Establishment (LRDE), a DRDO laboratory, and is produced by a joint venture between BEL, Larsen & Toubro, Astra Microwave and Entec. The radar employs a planar array antenna and provides simultaneous multi-beam coverage. It can handle 200 targets in track while scan mode and has a range of more than 150 km and up to 18 km altitude.

== Features ==
These features relate to the 3D CAR radar. Specifications for the Rohini, 3D TCR and Revathi are available in the links below.

- Medium-range 3D surveillance
- S band operation
- Surveillance range more than 200 km
- Covers elevation of 18 km in height
- High-altitude deployability
- Deployment in less than 20 minutes
- 150 Targets in TWS
- Array of ECCM features
- Integrated IFF
- Capable of detecting low-altitude targets, and also supersonic aircraft flying at over Mach 3 speed
- Frequency agility and jammer analysis

== Variants ==
DRDO has further developed its into three variants which are:

Rohini

The Rohini radar is mounted on a modified TATRA heavy truck and supported by a mobile auxiliary power unit. The TATRA is license manufactured by Bharat Earth Movers Limited (BEML).

Revathi

Revathi is the ship-borne secondary surveillance radar especially designed for the navy to search the air and sea target. The radar can auto track up to 150 targets including tracking. There are three Antenna Rotation Rates (ARR) of 6, 12, 24 RPMs. The radar has ECCM features.
Revathi radar is used to equip the 4 Kamorta-class corvettes.

3D TCR

It has been developed for Indian Army, with a tracking range of 90 km. The radar has a lower antenna mount and is packaged in two vehicles instead of three for the Rohini. It can also feed data to a weapons station 20 km away. It is currently in service.

== Current status ==
BEL anticipates a requirement for 100 Rohini radars. BEL delivered the first ROHINI to the Indian Air Force on August 6, 2008. Around 20 radars can be manufactured annually.

The ROHINI has a new Indian-developed antenna which is more advanced than that on the original CAR terms of power handling and beam forming technology.

Seven Rohinis were initially ordered by the Indian Air Force for their radar modernization program. The IAF then ordered 30 more radars after evaluation, making total orders 37 of the type.

The IAF has ordered eight Akash SAM squadrons, and the ROHINIs act as the central early warning system for an Akash squadron deployment.

The Revathi adds two-axis stabilization for operation in naval conditions, as well as extra naval modes.

Additional orders are also expected from the Indian Army if they order the Akash (missile) system.

As of 2022 the Sri Lanka Air Force is planning to purchase of two Rohini Radar systems.

Armenia placed an order for 15 Akash missile system for an order of ₹6,000 crore (equivalent to ₹65 billion or US$680 million in 2026). The delivery of the system is expected to take begin from Q2 2024.

Myanmar Navy's frigate Sin Phyu Shin (F14) was spotted with the Revathi radar during Milan 2024 naval exercise.

On 24 September, the Secretary of Defence Production, Sanjeev Kumar, flag of the first 3D CAR Prime radar from BEL's facility in Ghaziabad.

== Operators ==
3d-CAR operators as of 2024. Blue – Current, Green – Future

- India
  - Indian Air Force
  - Indian Army
  - Indian Navy
    - INS Jalashwa
    - Rajput-class destroyers
      - INS Rajput (decommissioned)
      - INS Rana
    - Kamorta-class corvette
- Myanmar
  - Myanmar Navy
    - Kyan Sittha-class frigate
- Armenia
  - Armenian Armed Forces — Armenia acquired 15 Akash Air Defence System from Bharat Dynamics Limited, with the transaction estimated to be valued at ₹6,000 crore (equivalent to ₹65 billion or US$680 million in 2026).
- Sri Lanka
  - Sri Lanka Air Force
- Turkmenistan
- Tajikistan
