= Arnala-class corvette =

Indian Navy ship class (1968–2003)

Class overview
- Name: Arnala-class corvettes
- Operators: Indian Navy
- Preceded by: Bathurst class; Flower class
- Succeeded by: Durg class
- In commission: 1968–2003
- Planned: 11
- Completed: 11
- Lost: 1
- Retired: 10

General characteristics
- Type: Anti-submarine corvette
- Displacement: 950 tons (standard); 1,150 tons (full load)
- Length: 81.8 m (268 ft 4 in)
- Beam: 9.2 m (30 ft 2 in)
- Draught: 2.9 m (9 ft 6 in)
- Propulsion: 2 shaft CODAG, 2 gas turbines - 30,000 hp; 1 diesel - 6,000 hp (4,500 kW)
- Speed: 30 knots (56 km/h)
- Range: 4,870 nmi (9,020 km) at 10 knots (19 km/h); 450 nmi (830 km) at 30 knots (56 km/h)
- Complement: 90
- Sensors & processing systems: Radar: Don-2, Slim Net, Hawk Screech; Sonar: Herkules hull-mounted & dipping active sonar
- Armament: 4 76mm guns (2 × 2); 4 RBU-2500 anti-submarine rocket launchers; 3 533mm torpedo tubes; Depth charges, mines

Arnala class was an Indian designation for the Petya III-class vessels of the Indian Navy.

Although these vessels were classified as frigates in the Soviet Navy, they were classified by the Indian Navy as anti-submarine corvettes due to their role and smaller size. Vessels of the class were named for Indian islands.

== Operational history ==
INS Kiltan (P79) and INS Katchall (P81) were part of the task force for Operation Trident during the Indo-Pakistan War of 1971.

The hulls of this class were of relatively inferior quality built only 5mm thick for use in the Baltic sea and Black seas, compared to the rest of the Navy's mostly British built ships which had 8mm thick hulls requiring the vessels to undergo major refit every 5 years to prevent corrosion. The Indian Navy constructed the Naval Dockyard at Visakhapatnam, primarily to service Russian vessels. But given the lack of engineering support from Russia there were inordinate delays in completing the servicing facility. This resulted in considerable delay of the second refit for INS Andaman (P74), which was in poor repair and subsequently was lost at sea in conditions, 140 miles (230 km) east of Visakhapatnam on 21 August 1990 around 2:03 pm, where it was conducting anti-submarine exercises with five other Indian warships. The Andaman's loss cost the navy an estimated Rs 8 crore, including the initial cost of the ship and weapons on board, as well as the lives of 15 sailors.

== Vessels ==
The corvettes of this class constituted the 31st Patrol Vessel Squadron of the Eastern Naval Command and the 32nd Patrol Vessel Squadron of the Western Naval Command.

Name	Pennant	Builder	Commissioned	Decommissioned	Fate
Arnala	P68		29 June 1972	9 April 1999	
Androth	P69		30 June 1972	9 April 1999	
Anjadip	P73		23 December 1972	13 December 2003	
Andaman	P74		28 December 1973		Sunk in a Storm 22 August 1990
Amini	P75		12 December 1974	16 September 2002	
Kamorta	P77		21 November 1968	31 October 1991	
Kadmatt	P78		23 December 1968	30 November 1992	
Kiltan	P79		30 October 1969	30 June 1987	
Kavaratti	P80		23 December 1969	31 July 1986	
Katchall	P81		23 December 1969	31 December 1988	
Amindivi	P83		1976	1986–1988	
