= List of ships present at International Fleet Review 2026 =

The International Fleet Review 2026 (IFR 2026) is an international maritime exercise hosted in Visakhapatnam, India and conducted by the Indian Navy on behalf of the President of India in February 2026 to improve relations with other navies in the region. This article is a list of the ships which have participated in the IFR 2026.

== India (host) ==
The IFR and exercise MILAN 2026 had 85 participating ships including 60 warships from the Indian Navy and four from the Indian Coast Guard. Additionally, SCI Saraswati, a Multi Purpose Offshore Vessel, of the Shipping Corporation of India and research vessel Sagar Anveshika of the National Institute of Ocean Technology were part of the events. INS Sumedha served as the presidential yacht during the event.

=== Indian Navy ===
Presidential yacht
Ship	Image	Class	No.	Commanding Officer	Note
INS Sumedha		Saryu class	P58		President Droupadi Murmu undertook the review from this ship.
Aircraft carrier
Ship	Image	Class	No.	Commanding Officer	Note
INS Vikrant		Vikrant class	R11	Captain Ashok Rao	Arrived on 17 February.
Attack submarine
Ship	Image	Class	No.	Commanding Officer	Note
INS Sindhukesari		Sindhughosh class	S60	Commander Jijo Mohan	
INS Sindhukirti		Sindhughosh class	S61	Commander Ajith Jacob	
INS Shankul		Shishumar class	S47	Commander Praveen Kumar Akela	
Destroyer
Ship	Image	Class	No.	Commanding Officer	Note
INS Visakhapatnam		Visakhapatnam class	D66	Captain Pradeep Raman	
INS Chennai		Kolkata class	D65	Captain Suraj James Rebera	
INS Mumbai		Delhi class	D62	Captain Shantanu Sharma	
INS Mysore		Delhi class	D60	Captain C. Sairam	
INS Rana		Rajput class	D52	Captain K. P. Sreesean	
INS Ranvir		Rajput class	D54	Captain Rahul Mehta	
INS Ranvijay		Rajput class	D55	Captain Prajit Menon	
Frigate
Ship	Image	Class	No.	Commanding Officer	Note
INS Nilgiri		Nilgiri class	F33	Captain Gurudeep Bala	
INS Himgiri		Nilgiri class	F34	Captain Robin Chakravarty	
INS Udaygiri		Nilgiri class	F35	Captain Vikas Sood	
INS Tarkash		Talwar class	F50	Captain Anirudh Mehta	
INS Tamal		Talwar class	F71	Captain Sridhar Tata	
INS Satpura		Shivalik class	F48	Captain Rajeev K. Tiwari	
INS Sahyadri		Shivalik class	F49	Captain Vikas Jha	
Corvettes
Ship	Image	Class	No.	Commanding Officer	Note
INS Kamorta		Kamorta class	P28	Commander Swapnil Srivastava	
INS Kiltan		Kamorta class	P30	Commander Alok Gaurav	
INS Kavaratti		Kamorta class	P31	Commander Ashwini Kumar Bura	
INS Kirch		Kora class	P62	Lieutenant Commander Advait Sarin	
INS Khanjar		Khukri class	P47	Commander Ronnie Chowpoo	
INS Arnala		Arnala class	P68	Commander Ankit Grover	
INS Androth		Arnala class	P69	Commander Guruprasad Patil	
Landing Ship, Tank
Ship	Image	Class	No.	Commanding Officer	Note
INS Shardul		Shardul class	L16	Commander Sumit Kumar Singh	
INS Airavat		Shardul class	L24	Commander Ishwar P. Patil	
INS Gharial		Magar class	L23	Commander Gaurav Tiwari	
Landing Craft Utility
Ship	Image	Class	No.	Commanding Officer	Note
INS LCU 55		Mk. IV LCU	55	Lieutenant Commander Harsukh Dadhich	
INS LCU 56		Mk. IV LCU	56	Lieutenant Commander Abhinash Patra	
Auxiliary ships
Ship	Image	Class	No.	Commanding Officer	Note
INS Jyoti		Komandarm Fedko class	A58	Captain Shobhit Aggarwal	
INS Shakti		Deepak class	A57	Captain Praveen Kumar Sinha	
INS Nistar		Nistar class	A16	Commander Amit Subhro Banerjee	
INS Tir		Training ship	A86	Captain Tijo K. Joseph	
INS Astradharini		Torpedo recovery vessel	A61	Lieutenant Commander Anurag Daima	
INS Anvesh		Floating Test Range	A41	Captain A. Ashok	
INS Gaj		Tugboat	A51	Lieutenant Commander Mukul Magotra	
Tall ship
Ship	Image	Class	No.	Commanding Officer	Note
INS Tarangini		Tarangini class	A75	Commander Nitin Nikhil Gajjar	Sailing Ship of the Indian Navy. Participated in the Search and rescue efforts following the Sinking of IRIS Dena.
Survey vessels
Ship	Image	Class	No.	Commanding Officer	Note
INS Sandhayak		Sandhayak class	J18	Captain Nattuva Dheeraj	INS Ikshak paticapated in the Search and rescue efforts following the sinking of IRIS Dena.
INS Nirdeshak		Sandhayak class	J19	Captain Ajay Chauhan	INS Ikshak paticapated in the Search and rescue efforts following the sinking of IRIS Dena.
INS Ikshak		Sandhayak class	J23	Captain Tribhuvan Singh	INS Ikshak paticapated in the Search and rescue efforts following the sinking of IRIS Dena.
INS Jamuna		Sandhayak class	J16	Commander Devendra Singh	INS Ikshak paticapated in the Search and rescue efforts following the sinking of IRIS Dena.
INS Darshak		Sandhayak class	J21	Commander Amit Kumar Padha	INS Ikshak paticapated in the Search and rescue efforts following the sinking of IRIS Dena.
INS Sarvekshak		Sandhayak class	J22	Captain Kishore Aer	INS Ikshak paticapated in the Search and rescue efforts following the sinking of IRIS Dena.
INS Makar		Makar class	J31	Commander Madhusudhanrao Maradana	INS Ikshak paticapated in the Search and rescue efforts following the sinking of IRIS Dena.
Patrol Vessels
Ship	Image	Class	No.	Commanding Officer	Note
INS Sunayna		Saryu class	P57		
INS Sumitra		Saryu class	P59		
INS Sukanya		Sukanya class	P50		
INS Savitri		Sukanya class	P53		
INS Sujata		Sukanya class	P56	Commander Jishnu Madhavan	
INS Car Nicobar		Car Nicobar class	T69	Lieutenant Commander Ankit Amitabh	
INS Cheriyam		Car Nicobar class	T72	Lieutenant Commander Tula Umesh Kumar	
INS Tihayu		Car Nicobar class	T93		
INS Baratang		Bangaram class	T68	Lieutenant Commander Aditya Kumar	
INS Batti Malv		Bangaram class	T67	Lieutenant Commander Satya Veer Singh	
INS Tarmugli		Trinkat class	T66	Lieutenant Commander Gagangeet Mahajani	
Immediate Support Vessels		Armed patrol boat	T35		
Immediate Support Vessels		Armed patrol boat	T36		
Immediate Support Vessels		Armed patrol boat	T37		
Immediate Support Vessels		Armed patrol boat	T38		
Immediate Support Vessels		Armed patrol boat	T39		
Immediate Support Vessels		Armed patrol boat	T40		

=== Indian Coast Guard ===
Pollution Control Vessel
Ship	Image	Class	No.	Commanding Officer	Note
ICGS Samudra Pratap		Samudra Pratap class	204	DIG Ashok Kumar Bhama	
Patrol Vessels
Ship	Image	Class	No.	Commanding Officer	Note
ICGS Veera		Vikram class	35		
ICGS Sarathi		Samarth class (Flight I)	14	Commandant Kundan Singh	
ICGS Sujay		Samarth class (Flight I)	17	DIG Davis John Manoj	

== Foreign participants ==
There were 19 warships from the navies of foreign friendly nations which will be participating in the Fleet Review. This is the first instance when military assets from Germany, Philippines and the UAE will participate in an Indian military exercise and event. Naval aircraft from the countries will also take part.

=== Ships ===
Surface combatants
Boat	Image	Class	No.	Country	Commanding Officer	Note
USS Pinckney (planned but cancelled)		Arleigh Burke-class destroyer	DDG-91	United States		The ship departed Singapore following a repair and maintenance exercise on 11 February. The ship's participation was cancelled due to "emergent reasons". It was replaced by a U.S. Navy P-8A Poseidon maritime patrol and reconnaissance aircraft (MPRA) from Patrol Squadron (VP) 4.
RFS Marshal Shaposhnikov		Udaloy-class frigate	543	Russia	Captain 1st rank Merkulov Sergey Viktorovich	The Pacific Fleet-based frigate departed from Muscat, Oman. The ship was reclassified as frigate in 2021.
JS Yūdachi		Murasame-class destroyer	DD-103	Japan	Commander Tsutsumi Toshio	Departed Ōminato Naval Base on 28 January. Constitutes the 53rd deployment of the JMSDF Counter Piracy Enforcement Deployment. Additionally tasked with intelligence gathering in the Middle East.
ROKS Gang Gam-chan		Chungmugong Yi Sun-sin-class destroyer	DDH-979	South Korea	Captain Yoon Hyuk-min	Departed Jeju Naval Base on 30 January. Second instance of the Navy's participation in Indian exercise.
HMAS Warramunga		Anzac-class frigate	FFH 152	Australia		The deployment is part of Australia’s Regional Presence Deployment program. Arrived on 16 February.
SAS Amatola		Valour-class frigate	F145	South Africa	Captain Dieter Jones	
BRP Miguel Malvar		Miguel Malvar-class frigate	FFG-06	Philippines	Captain Paul Michael P Hechenova	First foreign mission for the ship. The maiden exercise of the Philippines with India.
BNS Somudra Avijan		Hamilton-class cutter	F29	Bangladesh	Captain Mohammad Mosfikur Rehman	Arrived on 17 February.
Al Emarat		Gowind-class corvette	P111	United Arab Emirates		Arrived on 17 February.
UMS King Aung Zeya		Aung Zeya-class frigate	F-111	Myanmar	Commander Ye Win Thaw	
KRI Bung Tomo		Bung Tomo-class corvette	357	Indonesia	Captain Riyanto Agus Wibowo	Arrived on 17 February.
IRIS Dena		Moudge-class frigate	75	Iran		Arrived on 16 February After the exercise, she was sunk by an American submarine off the coast of Galle, Sri Lanka during the 2026 Iran war. 32 crew members rescued by the Sri Lanka Navy and Sri Lanka Air Force.
VPNS 17		Petya-class frigate	17	Vietnam	Commander Le Viet Nghi	Arrived on 12 February.
Auxiliary ships
Boat	Image	Class	No.	Country	Commanding Officer	Note
KD Sri Indera Sakti		Sri Indera Sakti-class support ship	1503	Malaysia	Captain Ananthan Tharmalingam	
IRIS Lavan		Hengam class tank landing ship	514	Iran		Participated at goodwill events in Mumbai. The ship and its crew of 183 sailors was later interned at Kochi at the outbreak of the 2026 Iran war following the sinking of IRIS Dena.
Patrol boats
Boat	Image	Class	No.	Country	Commanding Officer	Note
HTMS Krabi		River-class patrol vessel	OPV-551	Thailand		Arrived on 16 February.
SLNS Sagara		Vikram-class Offshore patrol vessel	P622	Sri Lanka	Captain Nilanga Dharmarathna	Two ships of the Sri Lankan Navy will take part in IFR 2026, both arrived on 16 February.
RNOV Sadh		Al-Ofouq-class patrol vessel	Z-22	Oman		
SLNS Nandimitra		Sa'ar 4-class fast attack craft	P701	Sri Lanka	Captain Lohitha De Silva	Two ships of the Sri Lankan Navy will take part in IFR 2026, both arrived on 16 February.
MCGS Huravee		Car Nicobar-class patrol vessel	P801	Maldives	Captain A. S. Prabhakar	Arrived on 12 February.
SCGS Zoroaster		Rajshree-class patrol vessel	P609	Seychelles	Captain Lyndon Lablache	Arrived on 12 February. Scheduled for her three month long second refit at GRSE later.

== Aircraft ==
Fighter aircraft
Aircraft	Image	Country	Note
MiG-29K		India	Primary carrier-borne aircraft of the Indian Navy.
BAE Hawk		India	Advanced Jet Trainer in the Indian Navy.
Maritime patrol aircraft
Aircraft	Image	Country	Note
Atlantique 2		France	
P-8 Poseidon		Germany; India; United States	The US P-8A was part of the VP-4 squadron.
Dornier Do 228		Germany; India	
Naval helicopter
Aircraft	Image	Country	Note
MH-60R Seahawk		United States; India	
HAL Dhruv		India	
Westland Sea King		India	

== Observer States ==
Observers from the armed forces of Bhutan, Kazakstan, Tajikistan as well as twenty members of the African Union were present for IFR-26. Representatives from 135 nations were also invited to observe the proceedings.

== See also ==
- Indian Navy
- Fleet review
- List of ships present at International Fleet Review 2005
- List of ships present at International Fleet Review 2013
- List of ships present at International Fleet Review 2016
- List of ships present at International Festival of the Sea, 2005
