= INS Sandhayak =

INS Sandhayak is the name of the following ships of the Indian Navy:

- INS Sandhayak (J18), lead Sandhayak-class survey ship, in commission from 1981–2021
- INS Sandhayak (2021), lead Sandhayak-class survey vessel
