= INS Nirdeshak =

INS Nirdeshak is the name of the following ships of the Indian Navy:

- INS Nirdeshak (J19), a Sandhayak-class survey ship, in commission from 1982–2014
- INS Nirdeshak (2022), a Sandhayak-class survey vessel
