= Pooran =

Pooran may refer to:

- Pooran, Jalore, a village in Jalore district, Rajasthan
- Pooran (singer) (1934–1990), Iranian singer
- Pooran (name), a given name and surname (including a list of persons with the name)

== See also ==
- Puran (disambiguation)
