= Puran =

Puran may refer to:

- Purana, a genre of ancient Indian literature
- Puran Tehsil, an administrative subdivision of Khyber Pakhtunkhwa, Pakistan
- Puran (name), a given name and surname (including a list of persons with the name)
- Puran-class barge, a class of ship
- INS Puran, a ship in the Indian navy

== See also ==
- Purana (disambiguation)
- Pooran (disambiguation)
- Purna (disambiguation)
- Puran poli, an Indian sweet flatbread
