= INS Dunagiri =

The following ships of the Indian Navy have been named INS Dunagiri:

- INS Dunagiri (F36) was a Nilgiri-class frigate launched in 1974
- INS Dunagiri (2022) is a Nilgiri-class frigate launched in 2022
