= Sandhayak-class survey ship =

Sandhayak-class survey ship or survey vessel may refer to:

- Sandhayak-class survey ship, first commissioned in 1981
- Sandhayak-class survey vessel, first commissioned in 2023
