= INS Agray =

INS Agray (P36) may refer to the following vessels of the Indian Navy:

- INS Agray (1991), an Abhay-class corvette commissioned in 1991 and decommissioned in 2017
- INS Agray (2024), launched in 2024
