= Rajabagan Dockyard =

Shipyard in India

Rajabagan Dock (RBD), also known as the Rishi Bankim Shipyard, is a shipyard in Kolkata, India. Situated on the left bank of the Hooghly River about three nautical miles down stream of Calcutta Dock System, the shipyard is mainly engaged in shipbuilding and repair of small and medium sized inland water transport and coastal vessels.

== History ==
Rajabagan Dock have a long history of existence. In 1967 it came into control of Central Inland Water Transport Corporation (CIWTC). However due to heavy losses it came under management of Garden Reach Shipbuilders & Engineers (GRSE) on 1 July 2006.

== Facility ==
As of 2006, RBD Unit is spread over 33 acres of land with 550 M open river front at Rajabagan. The unit is capable of pre-Launch activities of 03 ships of size 50M and post launch outfitting of 04 ships at open river. The yard has three jetties and also has three dry docks.

Dry Docks:

- Dry Dock No. 1: It is 185 M long, 12 M wide and 6.4M depth and can accommodate ship having a draft facility of 1.9 M.
- Dry Dock No. 2: It is 160 M long, 18 M wide and 9 M depth and can accommodate ship having a draft of 4 M. It is an all weather dry dock having portable cover.
- Dry Dock No. 3: It is 107 M long, 14 M wide and 6 M depth.

== See also ==
- Purak class barge
- Poshak class
- INS Palan
