= INS Sanshodhak =

Hydrographic survey ship

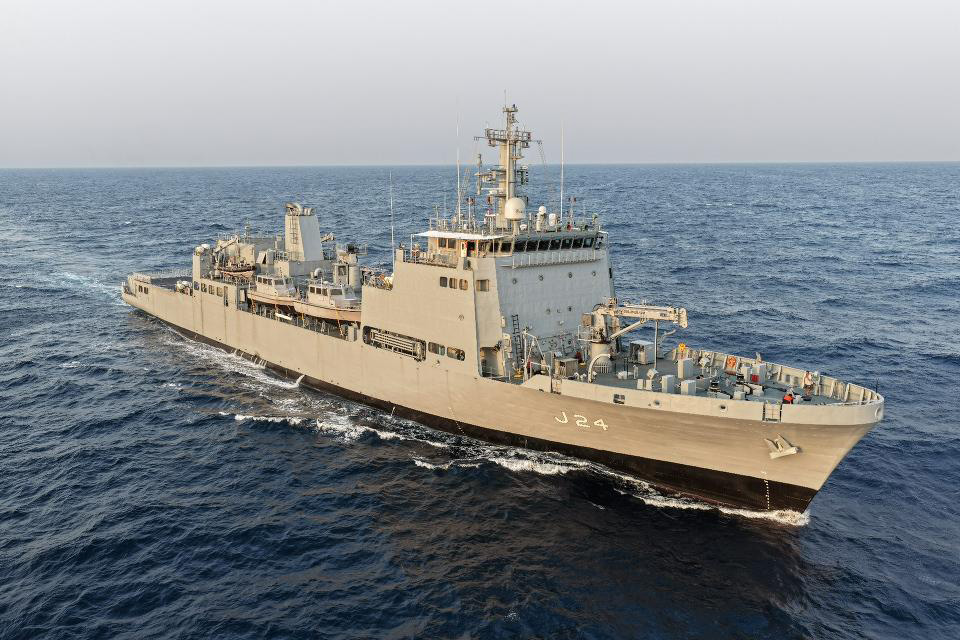
- Sanshodhak at sea.

History

India
- Name: Sanshodhak
- Ordered: 30 October 2018
- Builder: Garden Reach Shipbuilders and Engineers
- Yard number: 3028
- Laid down: 17 June 2022
- Launched: 13 June 2023
- Acquired: 30 March 2026
- Commissioned: 21 June 2026
- Identification: Pennant number: J24
- Status: Active

General characteristics
- Class & type: Sandhayak-class survey vessel
- Displacement: 3,300 tonnes (3,248 long tons)
- Length: 110 m (360 ft 11 in)
- Speed: 18 knots (33 km/h; 21 mph)
- Range: 6,500 nmi (12,000 km; 7,500 mi) at 14 knots (26 km/h; 16 mph) to 16 knots (30 km/h; 18 mph)
- Boats & landing craft carried: Survey Motor Boats (SMBs); Rigid Hull Inflatable Boats (RHIBs)
- Complement: 231
- Sensors & processing systems: Autonomous Underwater Vehicles (AUVs); Remote Operated Vehicles (ROVs); Multi Beam Echo Sounders
- Armament: CRN 91 naval gun
- Aircraft carried: 1 × HAL Dhruv
- Aviation facilities: Helipad

INS Sanshodhak is the fourth and final ship of Sandhayak class of survey ships. It is a hydrographic survey ship built by Garden Reach Shipbuilders & Engineers (GRSE) for the Indian Navy.

== Design ==
The ships have a displacement of 3,300 tonnes (3,248 long tons) and a length of 110 metres (360 ft 11 in). They have a cruising speed of 16 knots (30 km/h; 18 mph) with a maximum speed of 18 knots (33 km/h; 21 mph) and an operating range of 6,500 nautical miles (12,000 km; 7,500 mi) at a speed of 14 to 16 knots (26 to 30 km/h; 16 to 18 mph). The ships have a complement of 231 and are equipped with hydrographic sensor equipment and a hangar which can accommodate one advanced light helicopter. In the secondary role, the ships can be fitted with a CRN 91 naval gun. In addition, the vessels will follow MARPOL (marine pollution) Standards of the International Maritime Organisation and will be built per Classification Society Rules and Naval Ship Regulations.

The primary role of the vessels would be to conduct coastal and deep-water hydro-graphic survey of ports, navigational channels, Exclusive Economic Zones and collection of oceanographic data for defence. Their secondary role would be to perform search & rescue, ocean research and function as hospital ships for casualties.

== Construction ==
The class of the survey vessel were ordered on 30 October 2018 by the Ministry of Defence to the GRSE for its design, construction and delivery to the Indian Navy. The keel of the ship was laid on 17 June 2022 and launched on 13 June 2023. Following contractor trials and validation, she was delivered to the Indian Navy on 30 March 2026 along with INS Dunagiri and INS Agray. The three ships were commissioned simultaneously during a tri-commissioning event on 21 June 2026 in Kolkata.

== See also ==
- List of active Indian Navy ships
