= List of ships present at International Fleet Review 2016 =

This is list of the ships which participated in the International Fleet Review 2016 (IFR 2016) in Visakhapatnam, India.

== Indian Navy ==
=== Aircraft carriers ===
Name	Class	Pennant number	Commanding Officer	Image
INS Viraat	Centaur-class	R22	Captain Puneet Chadha	Older aircraft carrier
INS Vikramaditya	Kiev-class	R33	Captain Krishna Swaminathan	Flatter aircraft carrier

=== Destroyers ===
Name	Class	Pennant number	Commanding Officer	Image
INS Mysore	Delhi-class	D60	Captain M Paul Samuel	Long grey ship seen from above, with a smaller ship in the background
INS Delhi	Delhi-class	D61	Captain Sandeep Singh Sandhu	Long, grey ship passing a buoy
INS Kolkata	Kolkata-class	D63	Captain Rahul Vilas Gokhale	
INS Ranvir	Rajput-class	D54	Captain Sunil Kumar	Long, grey ship with many antennas
INS Ranvijay	Rajput-class	D55		Another long, grey ship with many antennas

=== Frigates ===
Name	Class	Pennant number	Commanding Officer	Image
INS Tabar	Talwar-class	F44	Captain Ashutosh Ridhorkar	Long, white ship
INS Shivalik	Shivalik-class	F47	Captain Vineet McCarty	Long, grey ship
INS Satpura	Shivalik-class	F48	Captain A. N. Pramod	Taller, shorter grey ship
INS Sahyadri	Shivalik-class	F49	Capt. Kunal Singh Rajkumar	Grey ship, decorated with many pennants
INS Teg	Talwar-class	F45		Large, white ship
INS Tarkash	Talwar-class	F50		Long, white ship against the Mumbai skyline
INS Beas	Brahmaputra-class	F37		Long, grey ship against a cloudy sky
INS Ganga	Godavari-class	F22		Long white ship, photographed from above

=== Submarines ===
Name	Class	Pennant number	Commanding Officer	Image
INS Sindhukirti	Sindhughosh-class	S61		Submarine crest with a large, black-and-white fish
INS Sindhuraj	Sindhughosh-class	S57		
INS Sindhuvir	Sindhughosh-class	S58		

=== Corvettes ===
Name	Class	Pennant number	Commanding Officer	Image
INS Karmuk	Kora-class	P64	Commander Akash Chaturvedi	Long, grey ship against a wooded background
INS Khanjar	Khukri-class	P47	Commander Kapil Kaushik	
INS Nirbhik	Veer-class	K41	Commander Anand Mukundan	Smaller, white ship seen from above
INS Kirpan	Khukri-class	P44		
INS Kuthar	Khukri-class	P46		White ship, seen from above
INS Kamorta	Kamorta-class	P28		Taller, grey ship
INS Kadmatt	Kamorta-class	P29		
INS Vibhuti	Veer-class	K45		

=== Patrol boats ===
Name	Class	Pennant number	Commanding Officer	Image
INS Suvarna	Sukanya-class patrol vessel	P52		White ship, seen from above
INS Subhadra	Saryu-class patrol vessel	P51	Commander Amit Mishra	
INS Sumitra	Saryu-class patrol vessel	P59		Long-grey ship anchored at a dock
INS Sukanya	Sukanya-class patrol vessel	P50	Commander Anshul Kishore	Naval officer looking at a long, grey ship
INS Saryu	Saryu-class patrol vessel	P54	Commander Sreekumar K. Pillai	White ship, seen from above
INS Sunayna	Saryu-class patrol vessel	P57		Long, narrow white ship
INS Sumedha	Saryu-class patrol vessel	P58		Large ship with many pennants at a dock
INS Sujata	Saryu-class patrol vessel	P56		Long, tall white ship

=== Sailing vessels ===
Name	Class	Pennant number	Commanding Officer	Image
INSV Mhadei		A76	Commander Dilip Donde	Single-masted sailboat
INS Sudarshini		A77	Commander Vikramaditya Malhan	Three-masted sailing ship
INS Tarangini		A75	Commander Deepak Subhramaniam	Three-masted ship with sails unfurled

=== Replenishment oilers ===
Name	Class	Pennant number	Commanding Officer	Image
INS Jyoti	Komandarm Fedko-class	A58	Capt. Shobit Srivastava	Long, grey ship seen through foliage
INS Shakti	Deepak-class	A57	Capt. Vikram Menon	Long, grey ship with a wide bridge

=== Amphibious warfare ships ===
Name	Class	Pennant number	Commanding Officer	Image
INS Airavat	Shardul-class	L24	Commander Jayant Mahadik	
INS Gharial	Magar-class	L23	Commander Vivek Kalia	
INS Kumbhir	Kumbhir-class	L22	Commander Neil Jose Manjooran	(Third from top)
INS Kesari	Kumbhir-class	L15		

=== Other ships ===
Name	Class	Pennant number	Commanding Officer	Image
INS Nireekshak	Diving support submarine rescue	A15	Commander Nishant Khanna	Grey ship with a helicopter above it
INS Cuddalore	Pondicherry-class minesweeper	M69	Commander Abhishek Simlai	
INS Sandhayak	Sandhayak-class survey ship	J18	Captain Vishal Sharma	
INS Darshak	Sandhayak-class survey ship	J21	Commander Amol G. Merwade	
INS Nirupak	Sandhayak-class survey ship	J20		
INS Sagardhwani	Marine acoustic research ship	A74		Tall white-and-orange ship
INS Kozhikode	Pondicherry-class minesweeper	M70		White ship, seen from above
INS Cannanore	Pondicherry-class minesweeper	M68		
INS Konkan	Pondicherry-class minesweeper	M72		

== Indian Coast Guard ==
Name	Class	Pennant number	Commanding Officer	Image
ICGS Samudra Paheredar	Samudra-class Pollution Control Vessel	CG 202	Deputy Inspector-General D. R. Sharma	
ICGS Vishwast	Vishwast-class advanced offshore patrol vessel	OPV30	Deputy Inspector-General B. Murugan	White-and-blue Coast Guard cutter

== Foreign ships ==
=== Australia ===
Name	Class	Pennant number	Commanding Officer	Image
HMAS Darwin	Adelaide-class frigate	FFG 04	Commander Phillip Andrew Henry	Grey ship with a tall mast

=== Bangladesh ===
Name	Class	Pennant number	Commanding Officer	Image
BNS Somudra Joy	Hamilton-class cutter	F28	Capt Arif Ahmed Mustafa	Two-masted ship reflected in calm water

=== Brazil ===
Name	Class	Pennant number	Commanding Officer	Image
BN Amazonas	Amazonas-class corvette	P120	Commander Alessander Felipe Imamura Carneiro	

=== China ===
Name	Class	Pennant number	Commanding Officer	Image
PLAN Liuzhou	Frigate	FFG 573	Commander Wang Kai	
PLAN Sanya	Frigate	FFG 574		

=== France ===
Name	Class	Pennant number	Commanding Officer	Image
French frigate Provence	Aquitane-class frigate	D652	Capt. Dominique Caille	

=== Indonesia ===
Name	Class	Pennant number	Commanding Officer	Image
KRI Usman Harun		359	Capt. Didong Rio Duta	

=== Iran ===
Name	Class	Pennant number	Commanding Officer	Image
IS Alvand	Alvand-class frigate		Capt. Mohamed Reza Ebrahimi	Long ship, photographed from above

=== Japan ===
Name	Class	Pennant number	Commanding Officer	Image
JS Matsuyuki	Hatsuyuki-class destroyer	D130	Commander Satoshi Takaoka	Long grey ship dockside

=== Maldives ===
Name	Class	Pennant number	Commanding Officer	Image
MCGS Huravee	Trinkat-class patrol vessel		Capt. Hassan Sinan	

=== Mauritius ===
Name	Class	Pennant number	Commanding Officer	Image
MCGS Barracuda	Kora-class corvette	CG31	Commander Rajneesh Kumar Dalal	

=== Myanmar ===
Name	Class	Pennant number	Commanding Officer	Image
UMS King Aung Zeya	Aung Zeya-class frigate	F11	Commander Khun Aung Kyaw	

=== Nigeria ===
Name	Class	Pennant number	Commanding Officer	Image
NNS Centenary				

=== Oman ===
Name	Class	Pennant number	Commanding Officer	Image
RNOV Al-Shamikh	Khareef-class corvette	C40	Commander Saleh Bin Salim Bin Saif Al Saidi	Modern grey warship
RNOV Al Seeb	Al-Ofouq-class patrol vessel	Z20	Commander Hassan Al-Siyabi	

=== Russia ===
Name	Class	Pennant number	Commanding Officer	Image
EPRON		SS63	Capt. Denis Berge	

=== Seychelles ===
Name	Class	Pennant number	Commanding Officer	Image
PS Topaz	Trinkat-class patrol vessel		Capt. Lyndon Lablache	

=== South Africa ===
Name	Class	Pennant number	Commanding Officer	Image
SAS Spioenkop	Valour-class frigate	F147	Capt. Michael Boucher	Grey ship passing a lighthouse

=== Sri Lanka ===
Name	Class	Pennant number	Commanding Officer	Image
SLNS Sayura	Sukanya-class patrol vessel	P620	Capt. Hasitha Deegoda Gamage	Ship docked in a container harbour

=== Thailand ===
Name	Class	Pennant number	Commanding Officer	Image
HTMS Saiburi	Chao Phraya-class frigate	FF458	Captain Surakit Pho-Ngam	

=== United Kingdom ===
Name	Class	Pennant number	Commanding Officer	Image
HMS Defender	Daring-class destroyer	D36	Commander Stephen W. J. A. Higham	White ship with ball antennas

=== United States ===
Name	Class	Pennant number	Commanding Officer	Image
USS Antietam	Ticonderoga-class cruiser	CG-54	Capt. Michael A. McCartney	Smaller ship with many antennas
USS McCampbell	Arleigh Burke-class destroyer	DDG-85	Commander Edward D. Sundberg	Ship with many pennants and its crew on deck

=== Vietnam ===
Name	Class	Pennant number	Commanding Officer	Image
VPNS Dinh Thien Hoang	Gepard-class frigate	HQ 011	Lt. Commander Nguen Quang Huy	

== See also ==
- Indian Navy
- Fleet review
- List of ships present at International Fleet Review 2013
- List of ships present at International Fleet Review, 2005
- List of ships present at International Festival of the Sea, 2005
- List of ships present at International Fleet Review 2026
