= INS Ikshak =

Hydrographic survey ship of India

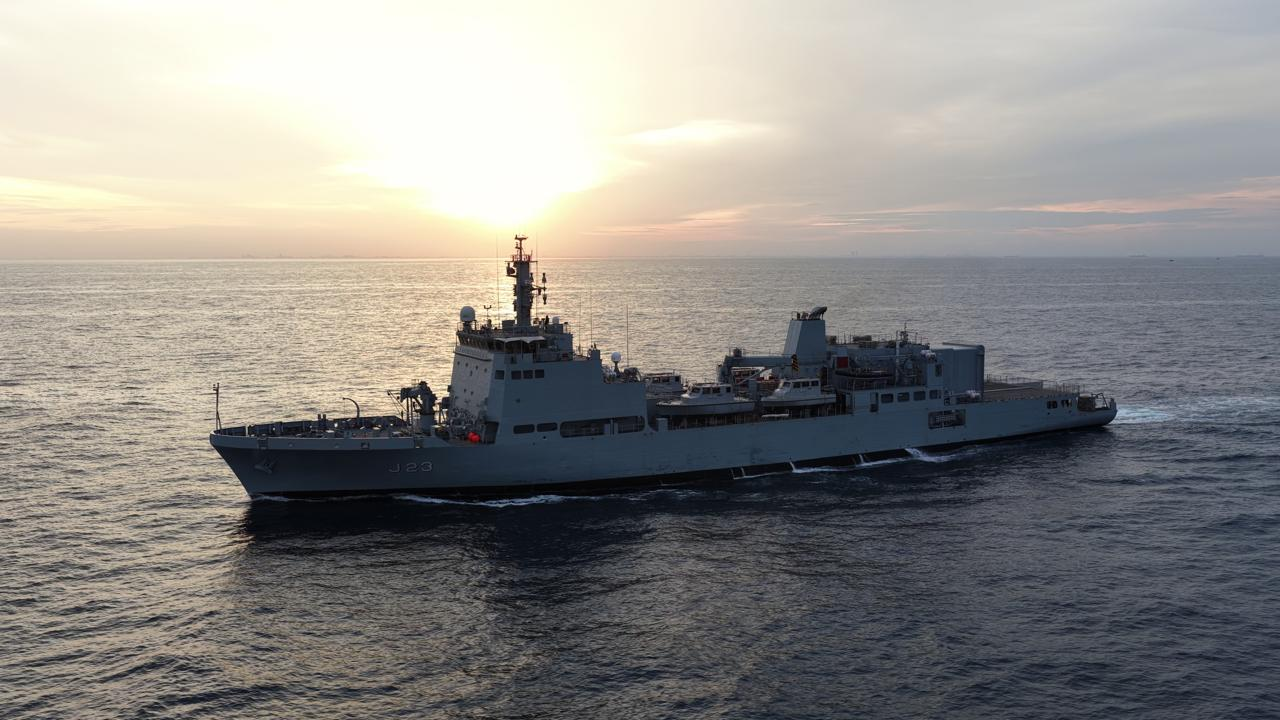
- Ikshak (J23) during sea trials

History

India
- Name: Ikshak
- Builder: Garden Reach Shipbuilders and Engineers
- Yard number: 3027
- Laid down: 6 August 2021
- Launched: 26 November 2022
- Acquired: 14 August 2025
- Commissioned: 6 November 2025
- Identification: Pennant number: J23
- Status: Active

General characteristics
- Class & type: Sandhayak-class survey vessel
- Displacement: 3,400 t (3,346 long tons)
- Length: 110 m (360 ft 11 in)
- Speed: 18 knots (33 km/h; 21 mph)
- Range: 6,500 nmi (12,000 km; 7,500 mi) at 14 knots (26 km/h; 16 mph) to 16 knots (30 km/h; 18 mph)
- Boats & landing craft carried: Survey Motor Boats (SMBs); Rigid Hull Inflatable Boats (RHIBs)
- Complement: 231
- Sensors & processing systems: Autonomous underwater vehicles (AUVs); Remotely operated vehicles (ROVs); Multi-beam echo sounders
- Armament: CRN 91 naval gun
- Aircraft carried: 1 × HAL Dhruv MK.3 Navy helicopter
- Aviation facilities: Helipad

INS Ikshak (Hindi: इक्षक lit. The Guide) is the third ship of her class of survey ships. It is a hydrographic survey ship built by GRSE for the Indian Navy.

== Design ==
The ships have a displacement of 3,400 tonnes (3,346 long tons) and a length of 110 metres (360 ft 11 in). They have a cruising speed of 16 knots (30 km/h; 18 mph) with a maximum speed of 18 knots (33 km/h; 21 mph) and an operating range of 6,500 nautical miles (12,000 km; 7,500 mi) at a speed of 14 to 16 knots (26 to 30 km/h; 16 to 18 mph). The ships have a complement of 231 and are equipped with hydrographic sensor equipment and a hangar which can accommodate one advanced light helicopter. In the secondary role, the ships can be fitted with a CRN 91 naval gun. In addition, the vessels will follow MARPOL (marine pollution) Standards of the International Maritime Organisation and will be built per Classification Society Rules and Naval Ship Regulations.

The primary role of the vessels would be to conduct coastal and deep-water hydrographic survey of ports, navigational channels, Exclusive Economic Zones and collection of oceanographic data for defence. Their secondary role would be to perform search and rescue, ocean research and function as hospital ships for casualties.

This is also the first of the class with dedicated accommodation for women personnel.

== Construction and career ==
The keel of the ship was laid on 6 August 2021. and launched on 26 November 2022.

The ship was expected to be commissioned in March 2025. It was handed over to the Indian Navy on 14 August 2025.

The ship was commissioned on 6 November 2025 at the Naval Base Kochi by the Navy chief, Admiral Dinesh K Tripathi with Captain Tribhuvan Singh as the commissioning commanding officer. She participated at the International Fleet Review 2026 held at Visakhapatnam. Following her participation she was involved in search and rescue efforts for the crew of IRIS Dena, an Iranian Frigate sunk during the 2026 Iran war off the coast of Sri Lanka.

She arrived at Port Victoria, Seychelles on 26 June 2026 as part of an operational deployment to the South West Indian Ocean Region. The visit was amid the 50th National Day celebrations of Seychelles. INS Tarkash was also part of the event. Both the ships departed on 29 June.

== Gallery ==
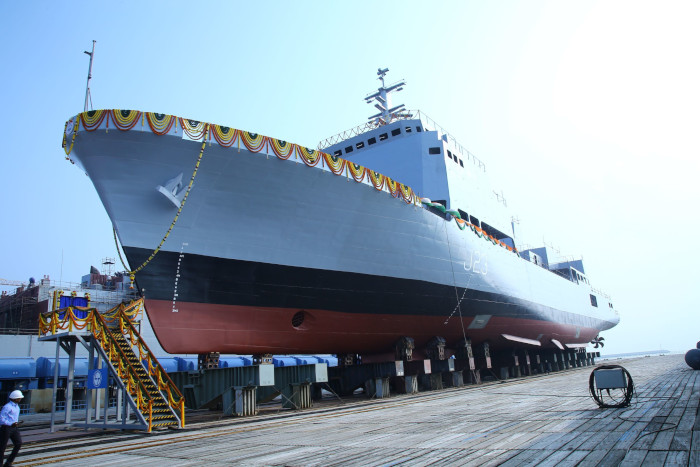
Launch of INS Ikshak, third ship of the SVL project, at Kattupalli, Chennai.

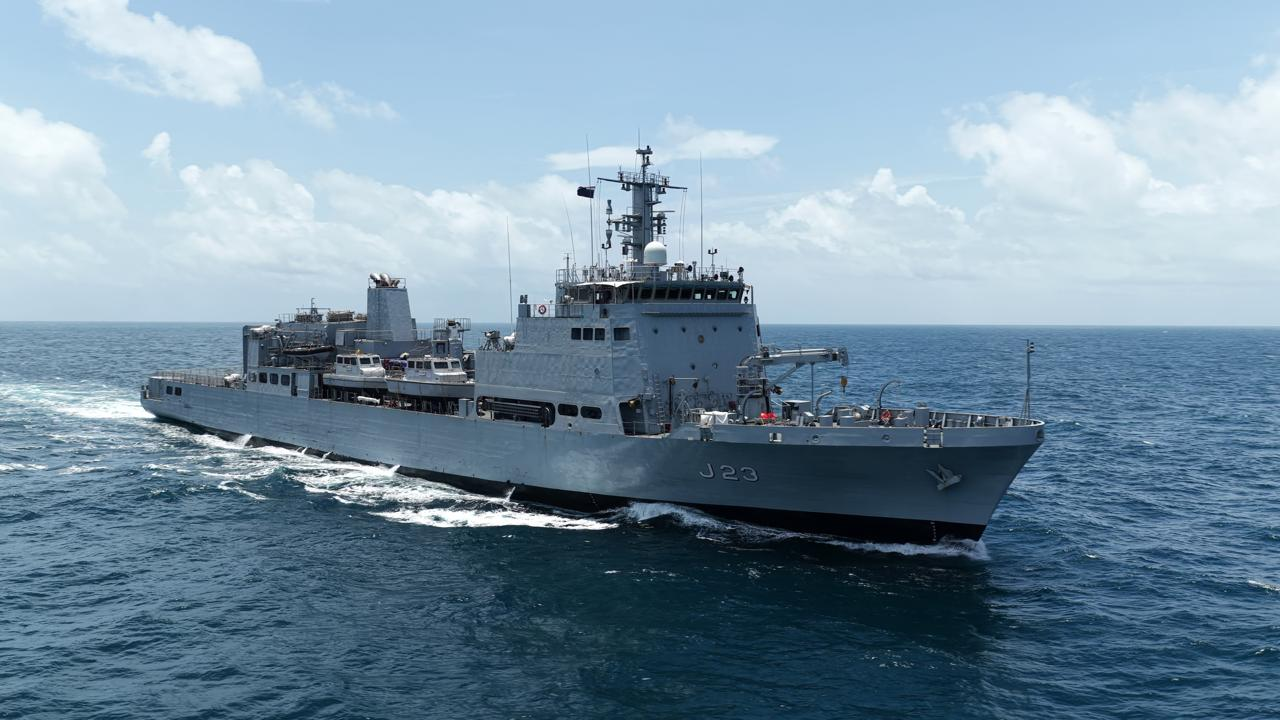
Ikshak (J23) at sea
