= INS Palan =

INS Palan is self-propelled fuel carrier built by Rajabagan Dockyard (RBD) (then owned by Central Inland Water Transport Corporation) for the Indian Navy. It was delivered in June 1986 at a cost of ₹5.719 million.

== Specifications ==
- Length: 58 m
- Beam: 9.1 m
- Draught: 3.1 m
- Displacement: 1200 tons
- Top Speed: 12 knots
- Engine: 2 Kirloskar MAN diesels, 1 propeller 1440 bhp
- Gross Tonnage: 624 tons
- Dead Weight Tonnage: 715 tons
