= Pooran, Jalore =

Village in Rajasthan, India

Pooran is a village in Jalore district of Rajasthan state. It is a major village of Raniwara tehsil.

The Pooran's old name is Padan. Pooran is also kingdom of Vora. Parkhani Vansh come to this village. The village has one old glass temple of the 3rd Tirthankara of Jainsism Sambhavnath which is around 130 years old. There is another temple outside the village which is a replica of Shri Shatrunjaya Tirth. The village has 75 houses of Porwal Marwaris.
