= INS Sandhayak (2021) =

Hydrographic survey ship

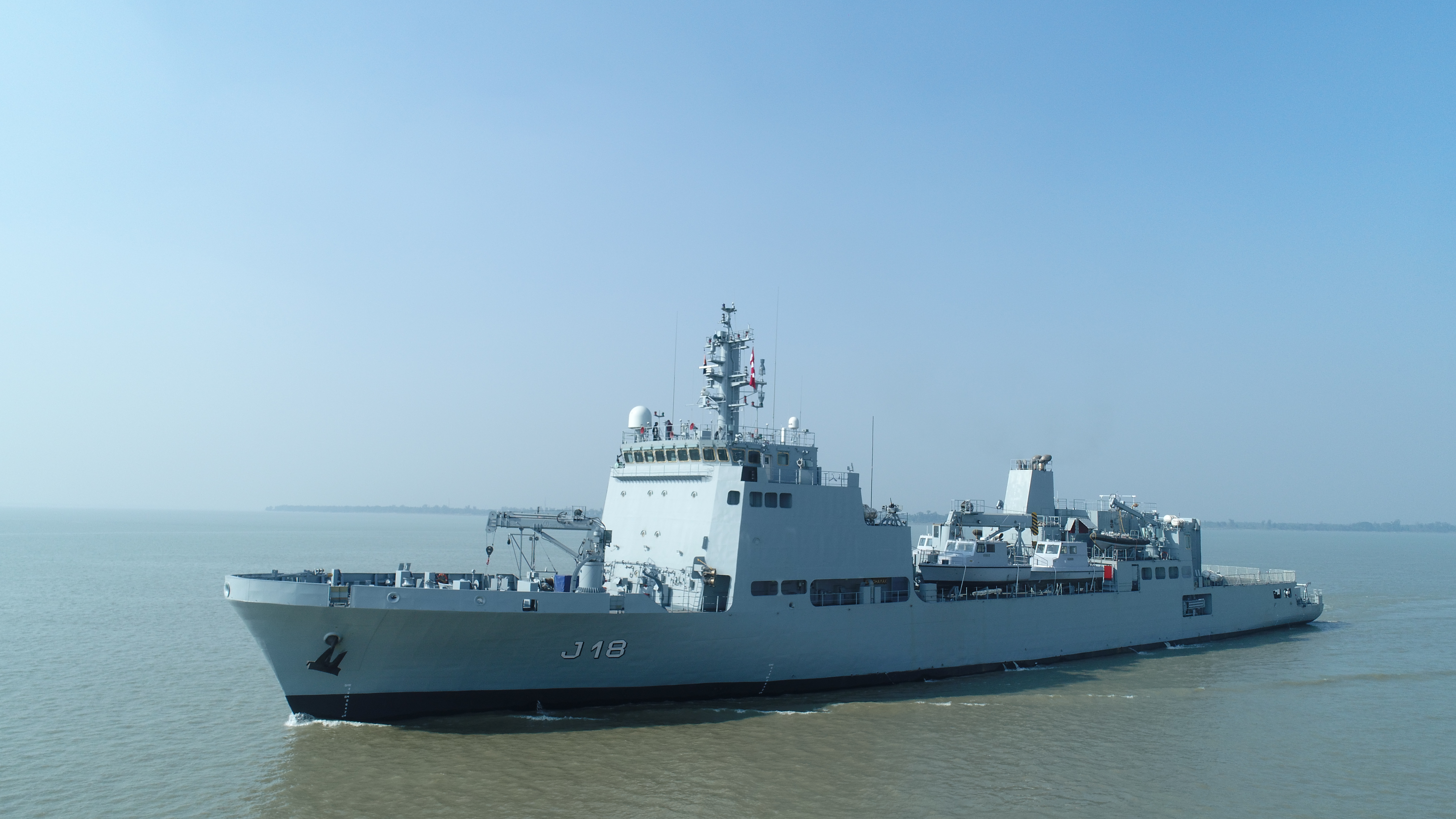
- Sandhayak during sea trials

History

India
- Name: Sandhayak
- Namesake: Sandhayak
- Ordered: 30 October 2018
- Builder: Garden Reach Shipbuilders and Engineers
- Yard number: 3025
- Laid down: 8 November 2019
- Launched: 5 December 2021
- Acquired: 4 December 2023
- Commissioned: 3 February 2024
- Identification: Pennant number: J18
- Status: Active

General characteristics
- Class & type: Sandhayak-class survey vessel
- Displacement: 3,300 tonnes (3,248 long tons)
- Length: 110 m (360 ft 11 in)
- Speed: 18 knots (33 km/h; 21 mph)
- Range: 6,500 nmi (12,000 km; 7,500 mi) at 14 knots (26 km/h; 16 mph) to 16 knots (30 km/h; 18 mph)
- Boats & landing craft carried: Survey Motor Boats (SMBs); Rigid Hull Inflatable Boats (RHIBs)
- Complement: 231
- Sensors & processing systems: Autonomous Underwater Vehicles (AUVs); Remote Operated Vehicles (ROVs); Multi Beam Echo Sounders
- Armament: CRN 91 naval gun
- Aircraft carried: 1 × HAL Dhruv
- Aviation facilities: Helipad

INS Sandhayak (Hindi: संधायक lit. coordinator) is the lead ship of her class of survey ships. It is a hydrographic survey ship built by Garden Reach Shipbuilders & Engineers (GRSE) for the Indian Navy.

== Design ==
The ships have a displacement of 3,300 tonnes (3,248 long tons) and a length of 110 metres (360 ft 11 in). They have a cruising speed of 16 knots (30 km/h; 18 mph) with a maximum speed of 18 knots (33 km/h; 21 mph) and an operating range of 6,500 nautical miles (12,000 km; 7,500 mi) at a speed of 14 to 16 knots (26 to 30 km/h; 16 to 18 mph). The ships have a complement of 231 and are equipped with hydrographic sensor equipment and a hangar which can accommodate one advanced light helicopter. In the secondary role, the ships can be fitted with a CRN 91 naval gun. In addition, the vessels will follow MARPOL (marine pollution) Standards of the International Maritime Organisation and will be built per Classification Society Rules and Naval Ship Regulations.

The primary role of the vessels would be to conduct coastal and deep-water hydro-graphic survey of ports, navigational channels, Exclusive Economic Zones and collection of oceanographic data for defence. Their secondary role would be to perform search & rescue, ocean research and function as hospital ships for casualties.

== Construction ==
The class of the survey vessel were ordered on 30 October 2018 by the Ministry of Defence to the GRSE for its design, construction and delivery to the Indian Navy. The keel of the ship was laid on 8 November 2019 and launched on 5 December 2021. She is the lead ship of her class.

The ship was delivered on the eve of Navy Day celebration on 4 December 2023. The ship was commissioned on 3 February 2024 in Visakhapatnam.

== Service history ==
On 19 July 2025, Sandhayak made her maiden port call at Port Klang, Malaysia following a hydrographic operation from 16–19 July. On 9 August, Singapore's National Day, the ship called at Changi Naval Base for a three-day visit. The ship departed Singapore on 12 August and is being commanded by Commanding Officer Captain N Dheeraj. She participated at the International Fleet Review 2026 held at Visakapatanam.

== Gallery ==
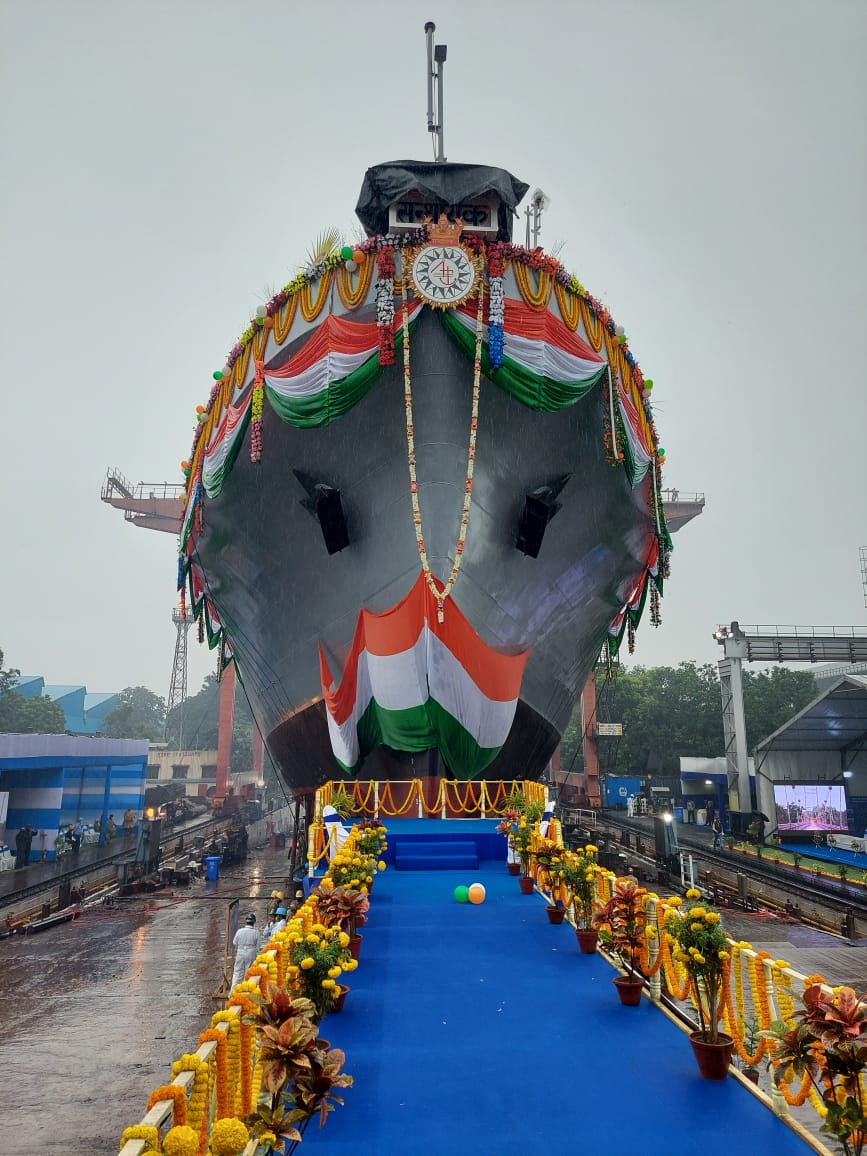
Sandhayak during its launch ceremony.

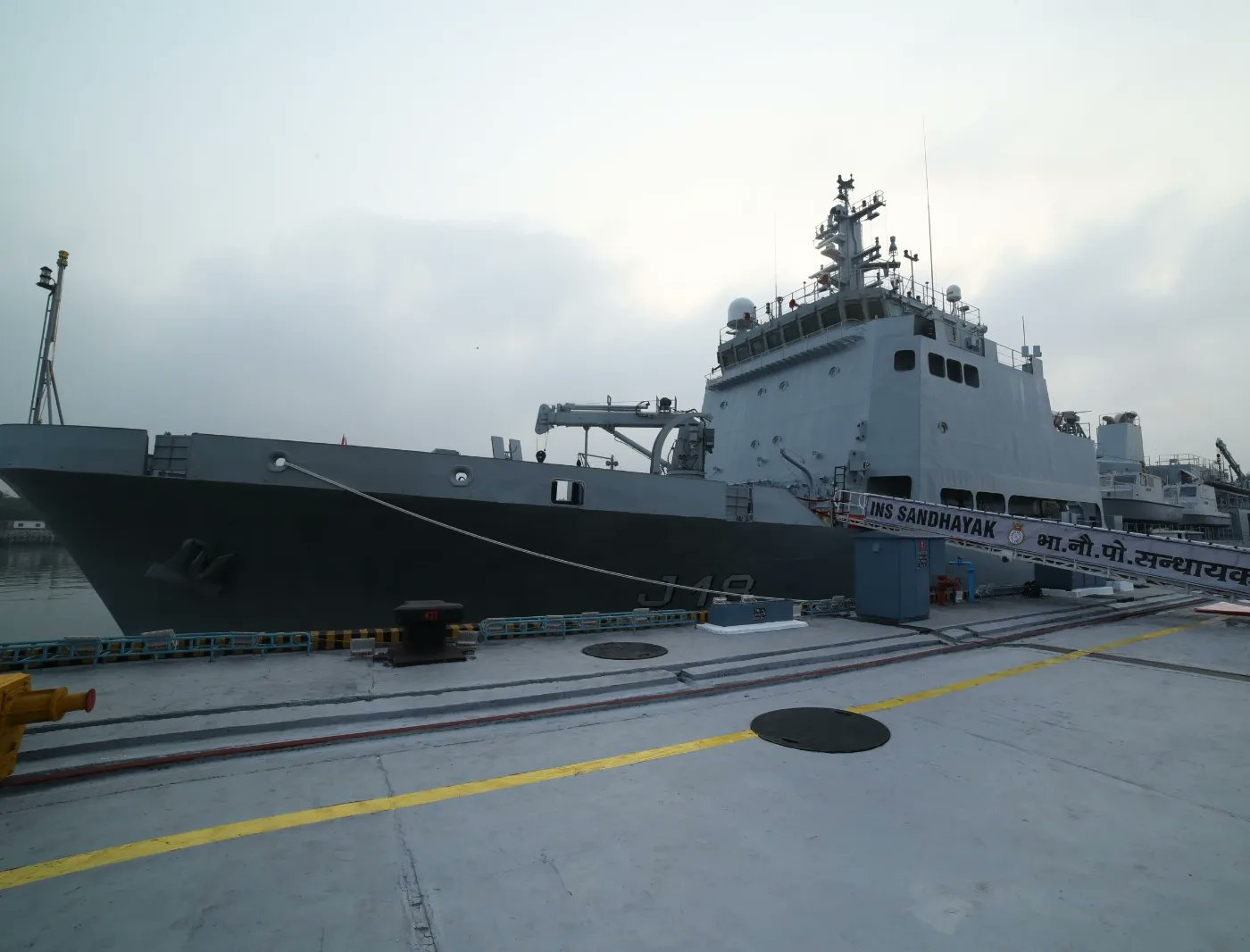
Sandhayak (2021) during commissioning ceremony

== See also ==
- Sandhayak-class survey vessel (2023) - class of survey ship
