= Puran-class barge =

Puran class of barge is a series of self-propelled fuel carrier built by Rajabagan Dockyard (RBD) (then owned by Central Inland Water Transport Corporation) for the Indian Navy.

== Description ==
The vessel in the series has a length of 45–50 meters with a beam of 8 meters and a draught of 3 meters. The vessels have displacement of 960 tonnes and have capacity to carry 376 tons of fuel. The vessels are yardcrafts and have all of the essential communication and navigation equipment. These vessels have no underway replenishment capability. They are utilized for in-port refueling

Barges in the class -
Name	commission	IMO number
INS Puran	3-June-1977	7039177
INS Pradhayak	February-1978	

== Specifications ==
Vessels of the class have the following specifications:

- Gross : 413 Tonnes
- Net : 252 Tonnes
- Dead Weight : 434 Tonnes
- Overall Length : 45.55 m
- Lbp : 42.32 m
- Brdth Ext : 7.95 m
- Brdth Mlt : 7.93 m
- Draught Max : 2.972
- Depth Mld : 3.84 m
- Ship Type : TANKER OIL
- No of Tanks : 4TA
- Capacities Liq : 266
- Engine Design : M. A. N.
- Power : 390 KW
- Aux Gen : 2X28 KW 415 V 50 Hz AC
- Speed (Knots) : 10
