= INS Nirdeshak (2022) =

Hydrographic survey ship

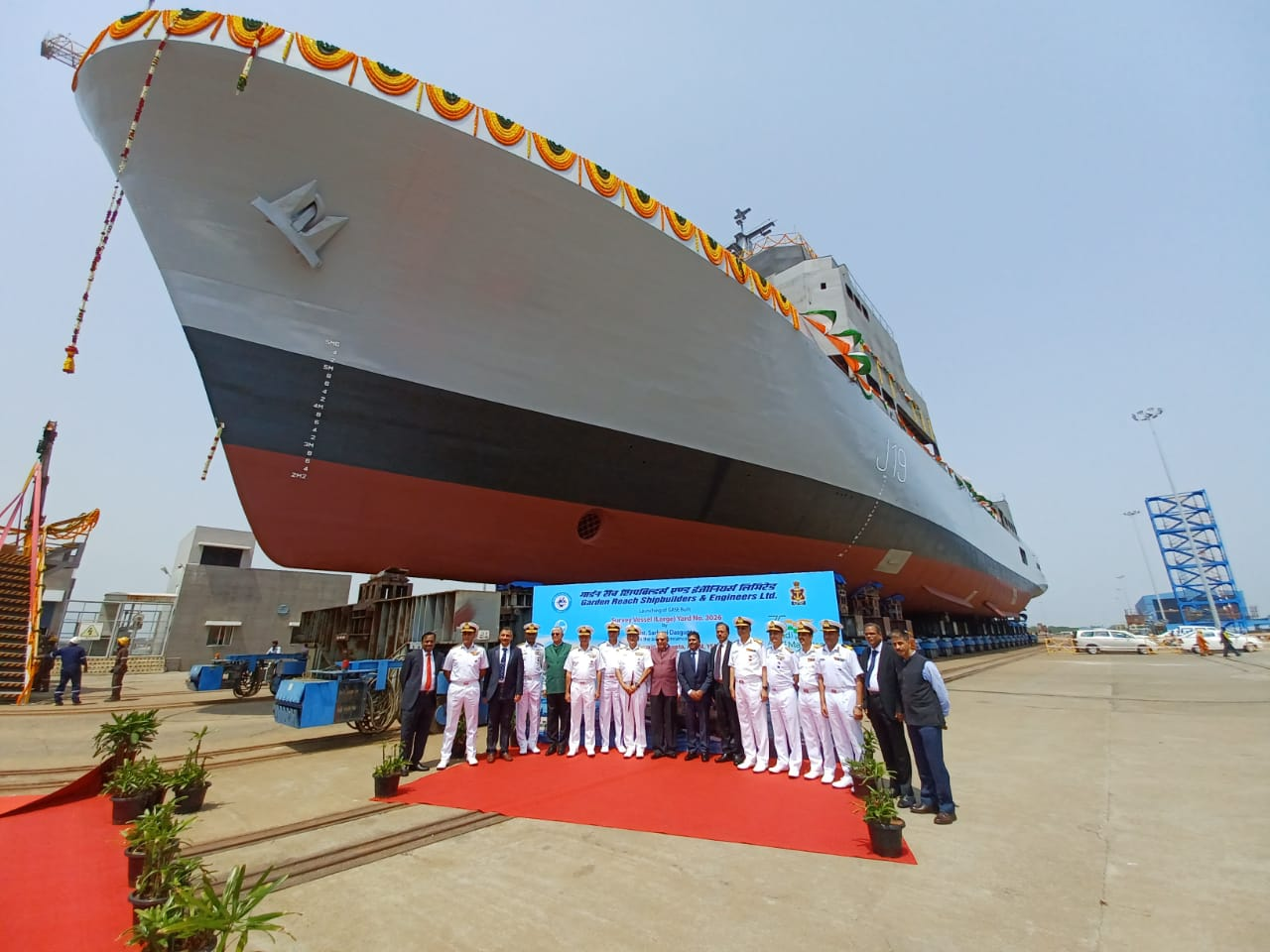
- Nirdeshak during launch

History

India
- Namesake: Nirdeshak
- Builder: Garden Reach Shipbuilders and Engineers
- Yard number: 3026
- Launched: 26 May 2022
- Acquired: 8 October 2024
- Commissioned: 18 December 2024
- Identification: Pennant number: J19
- Status: Active

General characteristics
- Class & type: Sandhayak-class survey vessel
- Displacement: 3,400 tonnes (3,346 long tons)
- Length: 110 m (360 ft 11 in)
- Speed: 18 knots (33 km/h; 21 mph)
- Range: 6,500 nmi (12,000 km; 7,500 mi) at 14 knots (26 km/h; 16 mph) to 16 knots (30 km/h; 18 mph)
- Boats & landing craft carried: Survey Motor Boats (SMBs); Rigid Hull Inflatable Boats (RHIBs)
- Complement: 231
- Sensors & processing systems: Autonomous Underwater Vehicles (AUVs); Remote Operated Vehicles (ROVs); Multi Beam Echo Sounders
- Armament: CRN 91 naval gun
- Aircraft carried: 1 × HAL Dhruv MK.3 Navy helicopter
- Aviation facilities: Helipad

INS Nirdeshak (Hindi: निर्देशक lit. director) is the second ship of her class of survey ships. It is a hydrographic survey ship built by GRSE for the Indian Navy. The ship inherits the same name as that of a previous survey vessel which served the Navy until December 2014.

== Design ==
The ships have a displacement of 3,400 tonnes (3,346 long tons) and a length of 110 metres (360 ft 11 in). They have a cruising speed of 16 knots (30 km/h; 18 mph) with a maximum speed of 18 knots (33 km/h; 21 mph) and an operating range of 6,500 nautical miles (12,000 km; 7,500 mi) at a speed of 14 to 16 knots (26 to 30 km/h; 16 to 18 mph). The ships have a complement of 231 and are equipped with hydrographic sensor equipment and a hangar which can accommodate one advanced light helicopter. In the secondary role, the ships can be fitted with a CRN 91 naval gun. In addition, the vessels will follow MARPOL (marine pollution) Standards of the International Maritime Organisation and will be built per Classification Society Rules and Naval Ship Regulations.

The primary role of the vessels would be to conduct coastal and deep-water hydro-graphic survey of ports, navigational channels, Exclusive Economic Zones and collection of oceanographic data for defence. Their secondary role would be to perform search & rescue, ocean research and function as hospital ships for casualties.

== Construction and service ==
The keel of the ship was laid on 1 December 2020 and launched on 26 May 2022.

The ship was delivered to the Indian Navy on 8 October 2024. It was commissioned on 18 December 2024. She participated at the International Fleet Review 2026 held at Visakapatanam. She visited Colombo port in Sri Lanka for an Operational Turnaround and a training visit in April 2026. She will take part in the 4th India-Sri Lanka joint diving exercise (DIVEX 2026), a bilateral diving exercise scheduled from April 21-27.
