= Puran (name) =

Puran, Pooran or Poeran (Dutch spelling) is a name or surname found in South Asia (India), Iran, the Netherlands, Suriname and Guyana. Notable people with this name include:

== Given name ==
- Puran Appu (1812–1848), Sri Lankan revolutionary
- Puran Bhagat, Punjabi ascetic
- Puran Bhatt, puppeteer from India
- Puran Singh Bundela, Indian politician from Uttar Pradesh
- Pooran Farrokhzad (1933–2016), Iranian writer and encyclopedist
- Puran Chand Joshi (1907–1980), Indian communist politician
- Pooran Chand Joshi, Indian social anthropologist
- Puran Singh Phartyal, Indian politician from Uttarakhand, member of the Bharatiya Janata Party
- Pooran Prakash, Indian politician from Uttar Pradesh
- Puran Rana Tharu, Nepalese politician
- Puran Singh (1881–1931), Punjabi poet, scientist and mystic
- Puran Chand Wadali, Indian Sufi singer and musician

== Surname ==
- Nicholas Pooran (born 1995), Trinidadian cricketer and former limited overs captain of West Indies cricket team

== See also ==
- Pooran (singer), Persian singer
