= INS Dunagiri (2022) =

Indian stealth guided-missile frigate

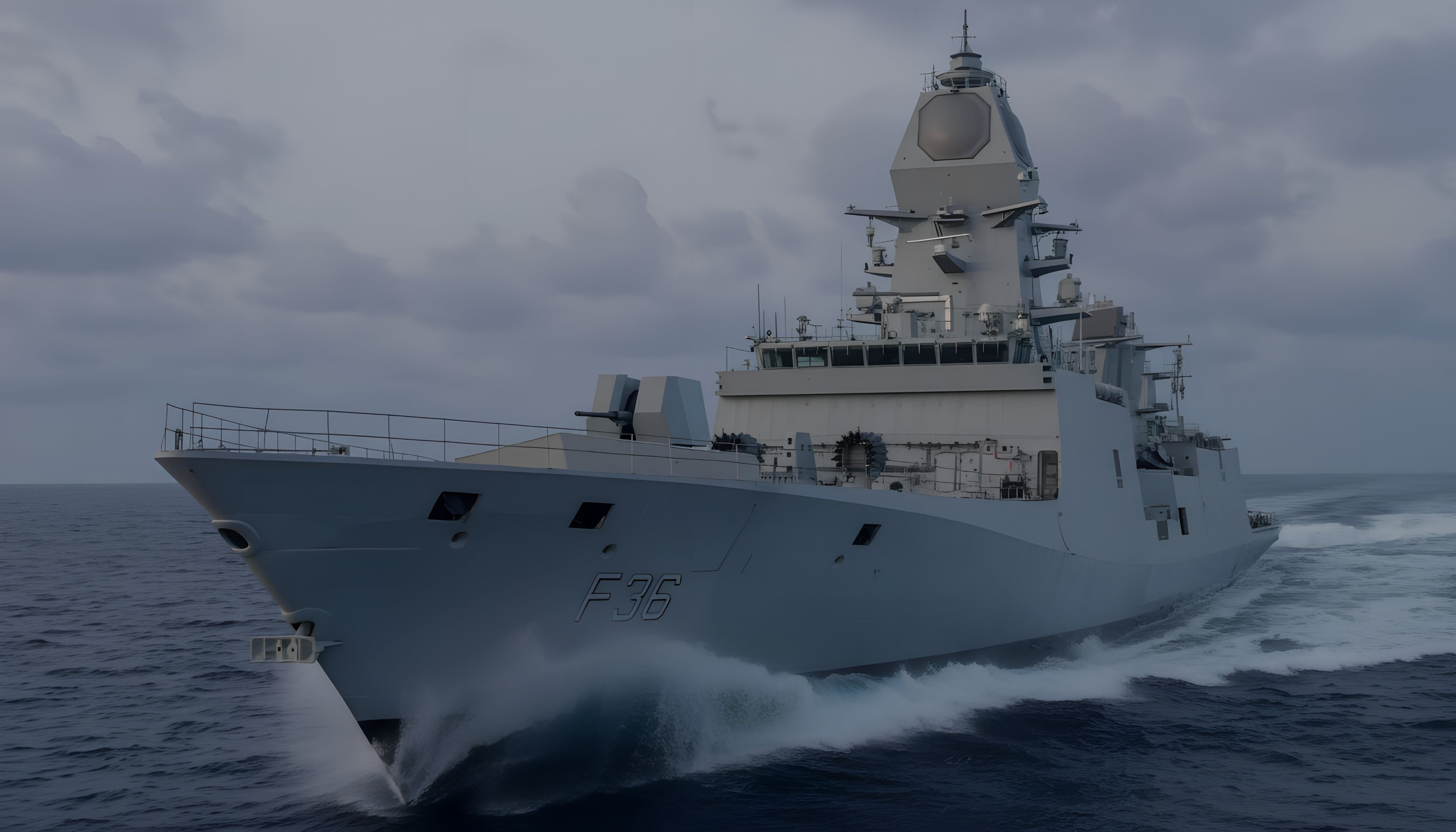
- INS Dunagiri

History

India
- Name: Dunagiri
- Namesake: Dunagiri peak
- Operator: Indian Navy
- Builder: Garden Reach Shipbuilders and Engineers
- Laid down: 24 January 2020
- Launched: 15 July 2022
- Acquired: 30 March 2026
- Commissioned: 21 June 2026
- Identification: Pennant number: F36
- Motto: "Victory is My Profession"
- Status: Active

General characteristics
- Class & type: Nilgiri-class guided-missile frigate
- Displacement: 6,670 tonnes (6,560 long tons; 7,350 short tons)
- Length: 149 m (488 ft 10 in)
- Beam: 17.8 m (58 ft 5 in)
- Draft: 5.22 m (17 ft 2 in)
- Depth: 9.9 m (32 ft 6 in)
- Installed power: 2 x MAN Diesel 12V28/33D STC (6000 kW each); 2 x General Electric LM2500
- Speed: 28 kn (52 km/h)
- Range: 1,000 nmi (1,900 km) at 28 kn (52 km/h); 5,500 nmi (10,200 km) at 16–18 kn (30–33 km/h)
- Complement: 226
- Sensors & processing systems: BEL HUMSA-NG bow sonar; IAI EL/M-2248 MF-STAR S band AESA radar
- Electronic warfare & decoys: BEL Ajanta EW suite; 4 x Kavach Decoy launchers; 2 × NSTL Maareech torpedo-countermeasure systems
- Armament: Anti-air missiles: 4 × 8-cell VLS, for a total of 32; Barak 8 missiles (Range: 0.5 km (0.31 mi) to 100 km (62 mi)); Anti-ship/Land-attack missiles: 1 x 8-cell VLS, for 8 BrahMos anti-ship and land-attack cruise missiles; Guns: 1 × 76 mm/62 BHEL Super Rapid Gun Mount naval gun (upgraded); 2 × AK-630 CIWS; Anti-submarine warfare: 2 × Triple torpedo tubes; 2 × RBU-6000 anti-submarine rocket launchers
- Aircraft carried: 2 × HAL Dhruv or Sea King Mk. 42B helicopters

INS Dunagiri is the fifth ship of the Nilgiri-class stealth guided missile frigates (P-17A) being built by Garden Reach Shipbuilders and Engineers (GRSE) for the Indian Navy.

== Naming ==
The ship is named after the Himalayan peak, Dunagiri. Her crest was unveiled on 11 June 2026. The crest depicts a Himalayan osprey flying above a mountain peak as a symbol for "precision, vigilance and dominance". This ship inherits the name, crest and legacy of the erstwhile Leander-class frigate INS Dunagiri (1977), now decommissioned.

== Construction and career ==
This is the second ship of the P-17A series of ships that are being built by GRSE. The ship was laid down on 24 January 2020 and it was launched on 15 July 2022. The ship is expected to be delivered by Q1 2026 and commissioned in the same year.

Dunagiri was delivered to the Indian Navy on 30 March 2026 along with INS Agray and INS Sanshodhak. The three ships were commissioned simultaneously during a tri-commissioning event on 21 June 2026 in Kolkata. In July, Rolls-Royce announced that INS Dunagiri and INS Mahendragiri are equipped with four MTU 12V 396 TE54 generator sets.

== See also ==
- Future of the Indian Navy
- List of frigates of India
- List of active Indian Navy ships
