= Sandhayak-class survey vessel (2023) =

Series of four survey vessels for the Indian Navy

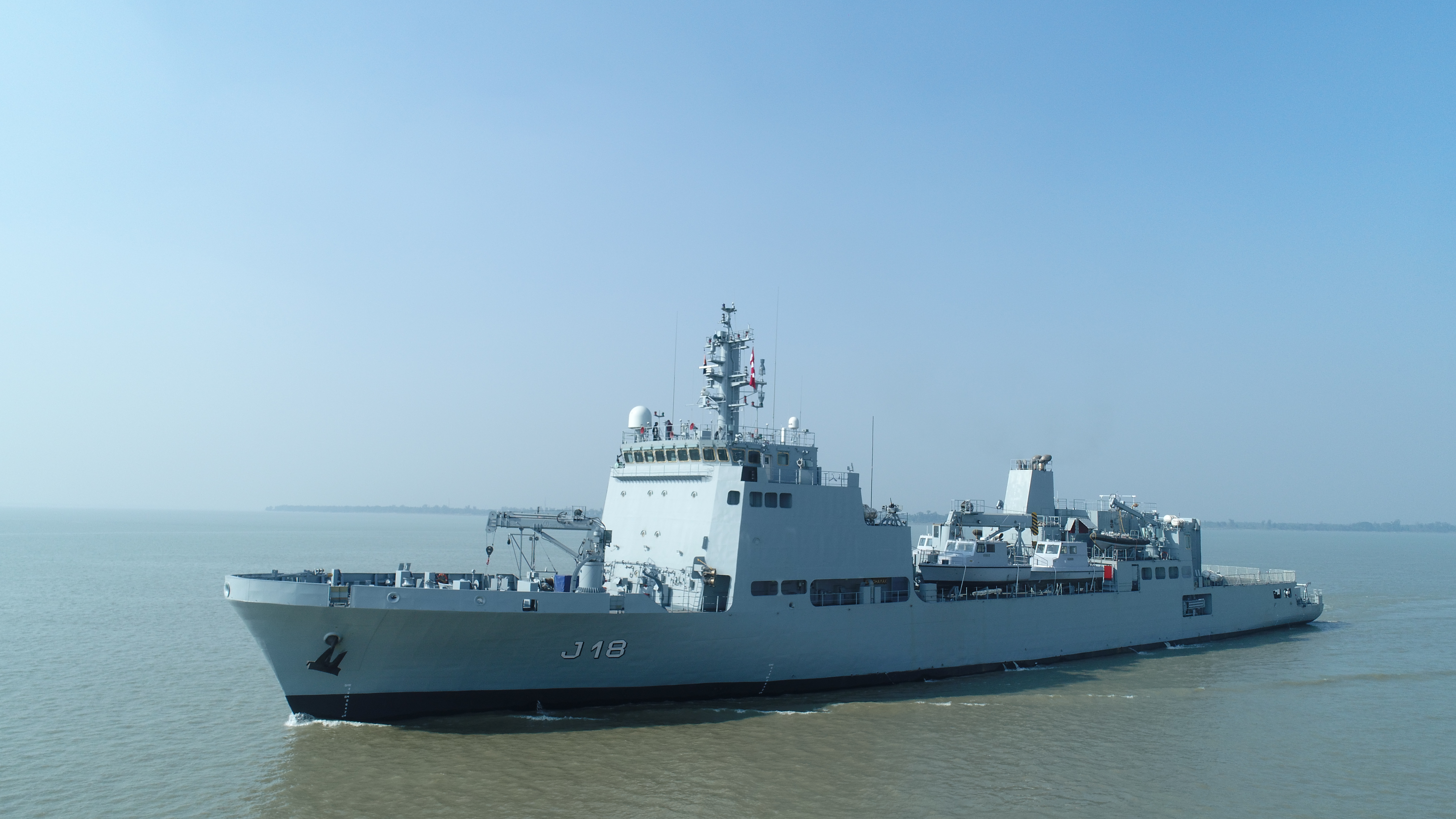
- Sandhayak (J18) during sea trials

Class overview
- Builders: Garden Reach Shipbuilders and Engineers
- Operators: Indian Navy
- Preceded by: Makar class
- Planned: 4
- Completed: 4
- Active: 4

General characteristics
- Type: Hydrographic survey ship
- Displacement: 3,300 tonnes (3,248 long tons)
- Length: 110 m (360 ft 11 in)
- Beam: 16 m (52 ft 6 in)
- Speed: 18 knots (33 km/h; 21 mph)
- Range: 6,500 nmi (12,000 km; 7,500 mi) at 14 knots (26 km/h; 16 mph) to 16 knots (30 km/h; 18 mph)
- Boats & landing craft carried: Survey Motor Boats (SMBs); Rigid Hull Inflatable Boats (RHIBs)
- Complement: 231
- Sensors & processing systems: Autonomous Underwater Vehicles (AUVs); Remote Operated Vehicles (ROVs); Multi Beam Echo Sounders
- Armament: CRN 91 naval gun
- Aircraft carried: 1 × HAL Dhruv helicopter
- Aviation facilities: Helipad

The Sandhayak-class survey vessels are a series of four survey vessels being built by Garden Reach Shipbuilders and Engineers (GRSE), Kolkata for the Indian Navy. The first vessel was commissioned in 2021. The primary role of the vessels would be to conduct coastal and deep-water hydrographic survey of ports, navigational channels, Exclusive Economic Zones and collection of oceanographic data for defence. Their secondary role would be to perform search & rescue, ocean research and function as hospital ships for casualties.

== History ==
In April 2016, the Indian Navy issued a request for proposal to six shipyards, four public and two private, for the construction of four large survey vessels. In September 2017, Garden Reach Shipbuilders and Engineers (GRSE) emerged as the lowest bidder with a bid of ₹2,435.15 crore (equivalent to ₹37 billion or US$390 million in 2026), beating L&T Shipbuilding by ₹742 crore (equivalent to ₹11 billion or US$120 million in 2026). The contract for design, construction and supply of the vessels was awarded to GRSE by the Ministry of Defence on 30 October 2018. The first ship is expected to be delivered within 36 months from the date of signing the contract.

== Design ==
The ships have a displacement of 3,300 tonnes (3,248 long tons) and a length of 110 metres (360 ft 11 in). They have a cruising speed of 16 knots (30 km/h; 18 mph) with a maximum speed of 18 knots (33 km/h; 21 mph) and an operating range of 6,500 nautical miles (12,000 km; 7,500 mi) at a speed of 14 to 16 knots (26 to 30 km/h; 16 to 18 mph). The ships have a complement of 231 and are equipped with hydrographic sensor equipment and a hangar which can accommodate one advanced light helicopter. In the secondary role, the ships can be fitted with a CRN 91 naval gun. In addition, the vessels will follow MARPOL (marine pollution) Standards of the International Maritime Organisation and will be built per Classification Society Rules and Naval Ship Regulations.

== Construction ==
The keel of the first ship Sandhayak, named after its predecessor Sandhayak, was laid down on 8 November 2019 and launched on 5 December 2021. It was expected to be commissioned by 2023, the boat was commissioned on 3 February 2024.

The second vessel of the class, Nirdeshak, was laid on 1 December 2020 and was subsequently launched on 26 May 2022. The ship was delivered to the Indian Navy on 8 October 2024. The ship was commissioned on 18 December 2024.

The third ship, Ikshak, was laid down on 6 August 2021 and launched on 26 November 2022. The ship was handed to the Indian Navy on 14 August 2025.

Sanshodhak was delivered to the Indian Navy on 30 March 2026 along with INS Dunagiri and INS Agray. The three ships were commissioned simultaneously during a tri-commissioning event on 21 June 2026 in Kolkata.

== Ships of the class ==
Name	Pennant	Yard No	Builder	Laid down	Launched	Delivered	Commissioned	Home-port	Status
Indian Navy
Sandhayak	J18	3025	GRSE	8 November 2019	5 December 2021	4 December 2023	3 February 2024	Visakhapatnam	Active
Nirdeshak	J19	3026	GRSE	1 December 2020	26 May 2022	8 October 2024	18 December 2024	Visakhapatnam	Active
Ikshak	J23	3027	GRSE	6 August 2021	26 November 2022	14 August 2025	6 November 2025	Kochi	Active
Sanshodhak	J24	3028	GRSE	17 June 2022	13 June 2023	30 March 2026	21 June 2026	Kochi	Active

== Gallery ==
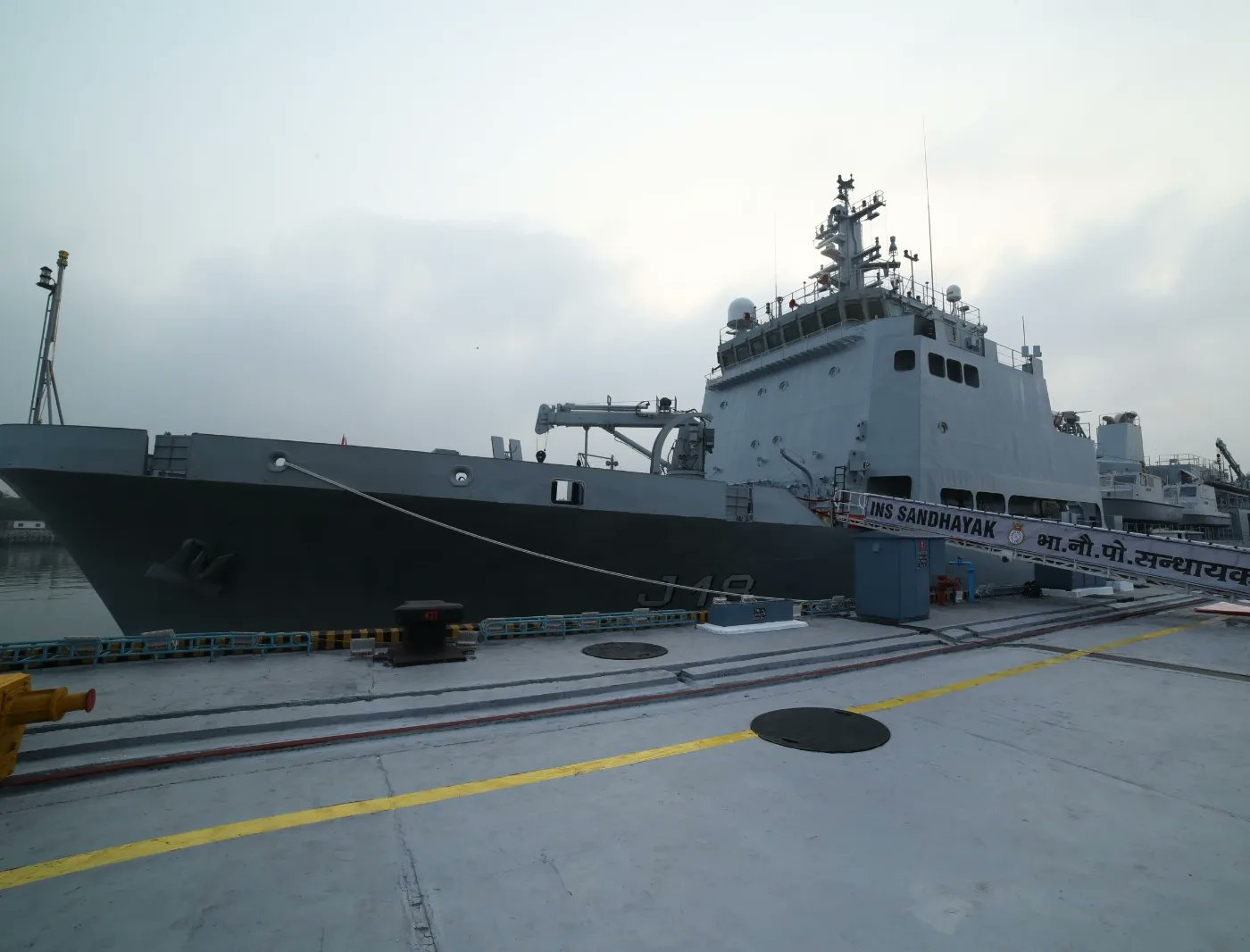
Sandhayak during commissioning ceremony.

== See also ==
- List of active Indian Navy ships
- Future of the Indian Navy
