= Garden Reach Shipbuilders & Engineers =

Indian Navratna defence shipbuilder based in Kolkata pvt ltd

Coordinates: 22°32′16.9″N 88°17′48.78″E

Garden Reach Shipbuilders & Engineers Ltd
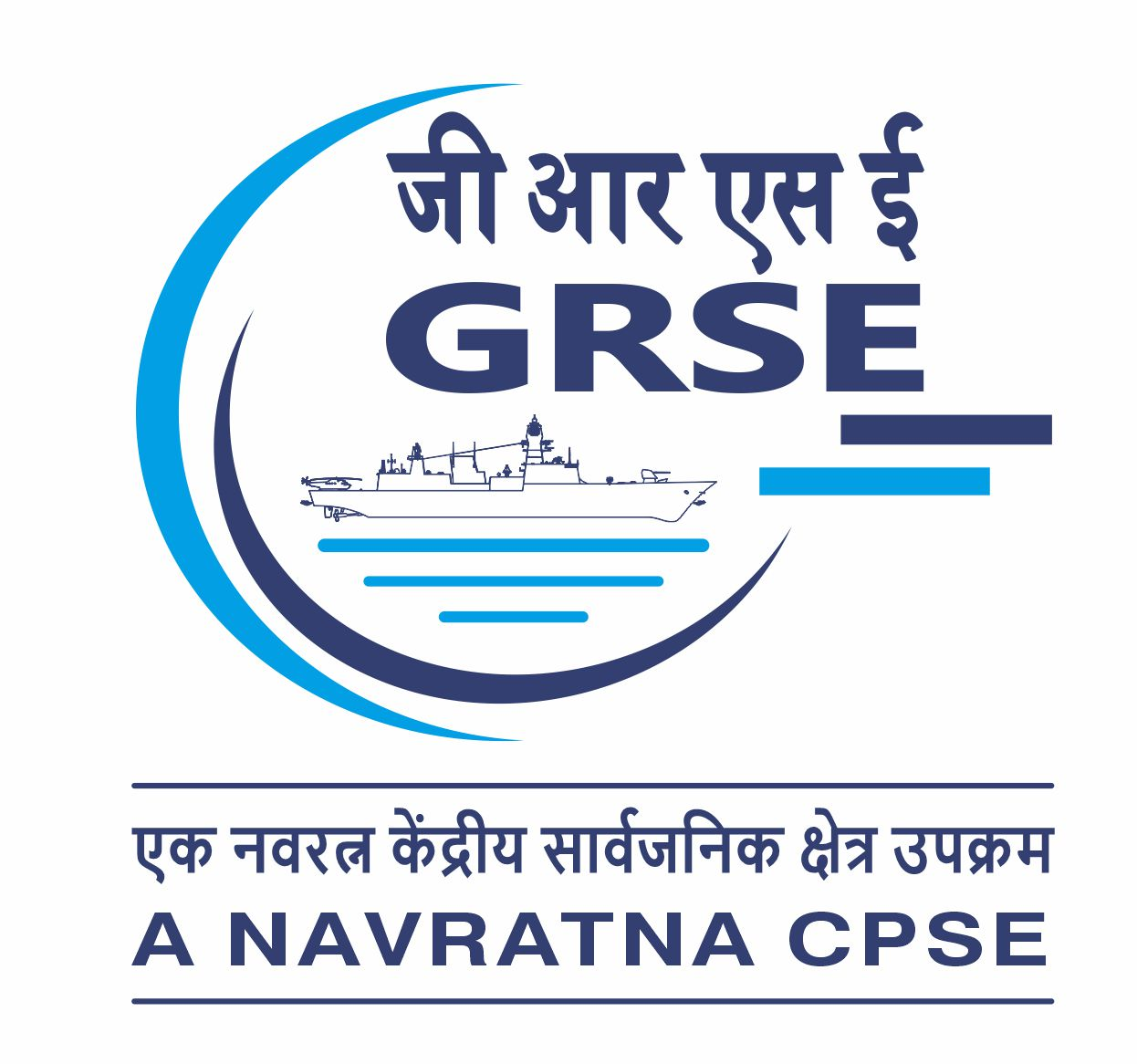
- Type: Public
- Traded as: BSE: 542011; NSE: GRSE
- Industry: Defence; Shipbuilding
- Predecessor: River Steam Workshop (1884); Garden Reach Workshops Limited (incorporated 1934); Taken over by Government of India (1960); Renamed Garden Reach Shipbuilders & Engineers Limited (1977)
- Founded: 1884
- Headquarters: Garden Reach, Kolkata, West Bengal, India
- Area served: Worldwide
- Key people: Cmde PR Hari, IN (Retd.) (Chairman & MD)
- Products: Warships; Naval and commercial vessels Patrol vessels Ferries and passenger vessels Naval surface guns Portable steel bridges
- Services: Ship design Shipbuilding; Ship repair Marine engineering
- Revenue: ▲₹7,002.16 crore (US$750 million) (FY2026)
- Net income: ▲₹747.94 crore (US$80 million) (FY2026)
- Website: www.grse.in

Garden Reach Shipbuilders & Engineers Ltd (GRSE) is an Indian defence shipyard based in Kolkata, West Bengal. It is a public sector undertaking under the administrative control of the Ministry of Defence, Government of India, and holds Navratna status, conferred on 19 June 2026.

The company builds and repairs vessels for the Indian Navy, Indian Coast Guard, government organisations and international customers. Its portfolio includes warships, patrol vessels, commercial ships, passenger and cargo ferries, and other marine platforms. It also undertakes ship design, marine engineering and the manufacture of defence-related engineering products.

GRSE traces its origins to 1884, when it began as a small workshop for repairing river vessels on the banks of the Hooghly. It was incorporated as Garden Reach Workshops Limited on 26 February 1934, taken over by the Government of India on 1 April 1960, and renamed Garden Reach Shipbuilders & Engineers Limited in 1977.

For the financial year 2025–26, GRSE reported revenue from operations of ₹7,002.16 crore and profit after tax of ₹747.94 crore, representing year-on-year growth of approximately 38% and 42%, respectively. The company delivered eight warships during the financial year.

== History ==
Originally established in 1884 as a small river steam workshop on the eastern bank of the Hooghly River to repair local river craft, it was renamed Garden Reach Workshop in 1916 and incorporated as a limited company in 1934. The enterprise was officially nationalised and taken over by the Government of India on 22 April 1960, which serves as the company's official Foundation Day. The company was subsequently renamed Garden Reach Shipbuilders & Engineers Ltd in December 1977 to reflect its broader multi-faceted heavy engineering and shipbuilding scope. GRSE was awarded Miniratna Category I public sector undertaking status in September 2006. It holds the distinction of being the first Indian shipyard to build 100 warships. On 19 June 2026, GRSE was granted prestigious Navratna status by the Government of India, becoming the 29th Central Public Sector Enterprise to achieve the designation. As of 2026, GRSE has delivered more than 800 platforms, including 118 warships, and has the capability to construct 28 platforms concurrently. Ongoing shipyard modernisation projects are designed to scale its concurrent shipbuilding capacity up to 32 platforms.

== Facilities ==
GRSE has ship building facilities in Kolkata and a diesel engine plant in Ranchi.

It has a large computer-aided design (CAD) centre for ship modelling and design. There are four workshops for plate preparation and steel fabrication.

GRSE has a dry dock for the construction of ships with up to 26,000 tonnes deadweight (DWT). It has a building berth and two slipways for hull construction. It has a covered all-weather non-tidal wet basin for fitting-out medium and small ships and another fitting-out complex for ships with three berths alongside. In addition, it has two river jetties for berthing smaller vessels up to 60 metres (200 ft) in length. GRSE has engine assemble, test, repair, and overhaul facilities in Ranchi, which spreads across 62 acres of land.

GRSE and Syama Prasad Mookerjee Port, Kolkata (SMPK) have inked a long-term concession agreement for GRSE to operate 3 dry docks. Here, GRSE undertakes multiple dry dock repairs of ships up to 160 m length, 20 m beam, and 7 m draught. These docks are situated inside a wet basin, which allows for docking and undocking operations independent of river tidal requirements. The wet basin also has multiple berthing facilities for afloat maintenance and refit operations.

On 1 July 2006, GRSE acquired the loss-making Rajabagan Dockyard (RBD) of the Central Inland Water Transport Corporation (CIWTC). RBD's facilities with its 600 metres (2,000 ft) waterfront helped alleviate some of GRSE's space constraints and increase its production capacity.

During 2011, the shipyard was undergoing a ₹530 crore (US$57 million) upgrade programme, which would be by March 2012. The second phase of the upgrade programme was scheduled to commence from June 2013.

On 7 October 2021, GRSE and SMPK jointly inaugurated the Khidderpore Dry Dock (KPDD) Unit.

On 30 January 2024, GRSE signed a Frame and Individual License Agreement with Rolls-Royce Solutions, Germany, to cooperate in the licensed production and localisation of the MTU IMO Tier II compliant Series 4000 Marine Engines for governmental ships. The agreement enabled GRSE to manufacture the engines in its Diesel Engine Plant in Ranchi. The engines can power warships of fast patrol vessel, interceptor boat and fast attack craft class ships of the Indian Navy and the Indian Coast Guard. It is already deployed on the Car Nicobar-class patrol vessel. The series of engines have power output range of 746–4,300 kW (1,000–5,766 hp). The agreement includes transfer of technology for engine assembly, painting, parts sourcing, and after-sales service for these engines. On 28 January 2023, a Memorandum of Understanding (MoU) had also been signed for the same purpose.

On the occasion of 80th Independence Day of India, in August 2026, GRSE renamed their three shipbuilding units and their design department in honour of iconic personalities from Bengal. This included the Main Works Unit, the Rajabagan Dockyard (RBD) Unit and the Fitting Out Jetty (FOJ) Unit being renamed as the Rabindranath Tagore Shipyard, the Rishi Bankim Shipyard and the Matangini Hazra Shipyard, respectively. Meanwhile, the Central Design Office (CDO) was also renamed as the Centre for Ship Design & Research.

=== Expansion ===
On 9 February 2026, GRSE signed an agreement with to form a consortium with Hindustan Shipyard to undertake joint large-scale shipbuilding programme.

On 14 July 2026, it was reported that GRSE is also reportedly planning to enter the container-manufacturing business. The company has also undertaken expansion project of its existing facilities. The current shipyard can construct 28 vessels annually which will be expanded to 32 vessels following the completion of the modernisation projects by December 2026. Further, the firm plans to expand two brownfield shipyards in West Bengal along with a greenfield shipyard each in West Bengal and Gujarat.

As for the project in Gujarat, GRSE will form a joint venture with Modest Infrastructure Ltd, a subsidiary of Dempo Shipbuilding & Engineering, to develop a ₹3,000 crore (US$320 million) integrated greenfield shipyard at Ratanpar in Bhavnagar district. The proposed facility, GRSE's first shipyard outside Kolkata, will be developed in phases and is designed to construct commercial vessels with up to 45,000 tonnes deadweight (DWT). The proposed shipyard will be developed on approximately 58 hectares (140 acres) of land, of which 40 acres (16.1 ha) will be owned by Modest Infrastructure, with a waterfront about 1.4 kilometres (0.87 mi) of along the Gulf of Cambay. The shipyard would be able to construct 1 ship of 45,000 tonnes deadweight (DWT), 3 ships of 20,000 tonnes deadweight (DWT) and six offshore support vessels or platform supply vessels per year. The project could also provide repair facilities for offshore rigs, offshore support vessels and platform supply vessels.

On 23 August, the Defence Minister Rajnath Singh virtually inaugurated the three shipbuilding infrastructure projects in West Bengal with a combined investment of around ₹2,670 crore (US$290 million). This included establishing a new greenfield shipyard at Raichak, South 24 Parganas; and expanding and upgrading two existing brownfield shipyards in Kidderpore of Kolkata and Shalimar of Howrah. GRSE signed a lease agreement with Syama Prasad Mookerjee Port, Kolkata (SMPK) to operate the existing yet unused shipyards in Khidirpur and Shalimar for 30 years while they acquired a 32 acres (13 ha) plot for the Raichak facility which has a 356-metre (1,168 ft) waterfront, a 96-metre (315 ft)-long jetty and a 8–10-metre (26–33 ft) draught. The Raichak facility will receive a dry dock, a slipway, a ship launching pad, each with a length of 200 metres (660 ft); two jetties with a length of 120 metres (390 ft) and 86 metres (282 ft) as well as facilities for block fabrication and consolidation, hull repair shops and stores and administrative offices. This over ₹2,500 crore (US$270 million) facility can construct warships with a length of up to 200 metres (660 ft) and commercial vessels of up to 60,000 tonnes deadweight (DWT) which lies in a category of Supramax class.

Further, the projects at the 4-acre (16,000 m^{2}) Timber Pond facility of Shalimar with a 88-metre (289 ft) waterfront will include the restoration of a 200-metre (660 ft) dry dock, the construction of a 120-metre (390 ft) slipway, shoreline protection work, and the installation of a dry dock gate and gantry crane as well as establishing facilities for block fabrication, stores and workshops at a cost of ₹100 crore (US$11 million) for medium-sized shipbuilding and repairs. Meanwhile, the Damodar facility at the Kidderpore Docks (KPD), equipped with an old workshop and a 25-metre (82 ft) waterfront, will receive a ₹70 crore (US$7.5 million) upgrade project for medium-sized vessel repairs and construction of electric ferries and other small craft. The Damodar is adjacent to the three dry docks at KPD already operational with GRSE for ship repairs and refits.

On 21 September, the board of directors of GRSE cleared the investment of ₹2,986 crore (US$320 million) for the construction of Raichak shipyard.

== Vessels built ==
=== Commercial vessels ===
Among commercial ships, GRSE builds non-propelled dredgers, grab hopper dredgers, trailing suction hopper dredgers, tugboats, multi-purpose vessels and bulk carriers.

On 23 July 2026, GRSE has been announced as the lowest bidder in a tender floated by Oil and Natural Gas Corporation (ONGC) for the construction of four platform supply vessels after the bids were opened. GRSE had submitted a bid with a quote of ₹258 crore (US$28 million) per vessel for a total of ₹1,032 crore (US$110 million). The shipyard will receive a financial assistance in the range of 15–20% from the union government under the Shipbuilding Financial Assistance Policy (SBFAP). The notification of award was received by the shipyard as of September 2026. The contract was signed on 15 October. The vessels have a length of 80 metres (260 ft), beam of 20 metres (66 ft), a 3,000 tonnes deadweight (DWT), a clear deck area of 650 m^{2} (7,000 sq ft) and an endurance of 48 days. They will feature hybrid propulsion with electrically driven azimuth thrusters and a lithium-ion battery energy storage system to support peak load management, spinning reserve, dynamic positioning operations and emergency response functions. The design will be according to classification rules of the Indian Register of Shipping.

In late August 2026, GRSE received a ₹45.02 crore (equivalent to ₹48 crore or US$5.1 million in 2026) contract from the West Bengal Tourism Development Corporation Limited (WBTDCL) for the procurement of two 100-passenger electric passenger ferry which will be delivered within 18 months.

==== Exports ====
On 22 June 2024, GRSE secured a contract for the design, construction and delivery of four multi-purpose vessels (MPV) to transport windmill blades. The deal was signed by Carsten Rehder Schiffsmakler and Reederei, a German shipbroker and shipowner firm and GRSE for a value of $54 million. The 7,500-tonne deadweight (DWT) vessels will measure 120 metres in length and 17 metres in width with a maximum draught of 6.75 metres. The ships will have a single, large cargo hold compartment capable of accommodating bulk, general, and project cargoes. Additionally, they will also be capable of carrying containers or windmill blades on the hatch covers. GRSE has also secured an order of additional 4 MPVs under the "Option Agreement". This brings the total order value of $108 million for 8 ships. The contract for the construction and delivery of 5th ship was signed on 3 October 2024. The final contracts, including those for the seventh and eight vessels, were signed on 24 March 2025. The steel cutting ceremony for the first vessel of the CORAL 7500 DWT MPV series was held on 17 April 2025. The project is undertaken in coordination with multiple firms including F.H. Bertling, ForestWave Navigation/Schulte & Bruns, and Delft Shipping. Meanwhile, M/s SEDS and DNV are the designing partner and the agency for classification and certification, respectively. ForestWave will serve as the time chartered for the first and fifth vessel, named CORAL STRAIT and CADIZ STRAIT, respectively. This is Carsten Rehder's first project in India.

On 1 July 2024, GRSE received another $21 million order for a 800-tonne Advanced Ocean-Going Tug from the Bangladesh Navy. The tugboat will be delivered within 24 months of signing the contract. The tugboat is expected to measure 61 meters in length, about 15.80 meters in width and have a draught of nearly 6.80 meters. The order was received a few weeks after receiving an order for a trailing suction hopper dredger (TSHD). GRSE also has an order of 6 patrol boats for the Bangladesh's Department of Fisheries.

During September 2025, the shipyard was constructing 26 commercial vessels, of which nine are meant for export.

On 19 September 2025, Germany's Carsten Rehder placed another order for four Hybrid Multi-Purpose Vessels (MPVs). The contract, worth $62.44 million was signed in Hamburg, Germany and includes an Option Agreement for two more vessels. These Hybrid MPVs will have similar dimensions and cargo capabilities as in the CORAL 7500 DWT MPV series except for the MPVs will feature battery-assisted hybrid propulsion system with enhanced fuel efficiency. The design will be in line with the International Maritime Organization’s (IMO) decarbonisation targets. This contract expanded the project to 12 vessels making it the largest commercial shipbuilding order ever secured by GRSE. The fourth keel was laid on 30 August 2026.

=== Scientific vessels ===
Among scientific ships, GRSE builds oceanographic, hydrographic and marine acoustic research vessels.

On 16 July 2024, GRSE signed a contract worth ₹840 crore (equivalent to ₹895 crore or US$96 million in 2026) with the National Centre for Polar and Ocean Research (NCPOR), Ministry of Earth Sciences, Government of India, for construction of an advanced Ocean Research Vessel (ORV). The project would be delivered within 42 months. The vessels will be 89.5 m (294 ft) in length, 18.8 m (62 ft) in width and 12.5 m (41 ft) in depth with a gross tonnage of 5,900 t (5,800 long tons; 6,500 short tons) and would clock a speed of 14 knots (26 km/h) at 90% maximum continuous rating. It will be able to operate up to a depth of 6,000 metres (20,000 ft). The launching ceremony of the ship was conducted on 9 September 2026, five months after the keel laying of the ship at the Rishi Bankim Shipyard. The ship had been christened Sagar Manthan and was expected to be ready for use by early 2028. The ship will carry sub-bottom profilers, seismic equipment, advanced oceanographic instruments as well as a doppler weather radar for atmospheric observations. The ship will also be capable of launching and recovering autonomous underwater vehicles (AUVs) and remotely operated underwater vehicles (ROVs).

On 29 October 2024, the Naval Physical and Oceanographic Laboratory (NPOL), an organization under the DRDO, placed an order for a new Acoustic Research Ship (ARS) with GRSE. The order worth ₹490.98 crore (equivalent to ₹523 crore or US$56 million in 2026) was signed in Kochi. The ARS will have an overall length of 90 m (300 ft) and a beam of 14 m (46 ft). It will be able to achieve speeds ranging up to 12 kn (22 km/h; 14 mph). The ship will have a minimum endurance of 30 days or 4,500 nmi (8,300 km; 5,200 mi). It will have a complement of 70 personnel. The vessel will have diesel-electric propulsion and 3 deck cranes will be fitted on board to handle research equipment. The ARS will be able to deploy, tow, and retrieve a variety of equipment, including acoustic modules; conduct high-resolution surveys of sound velocity profiles in time and/or space; and gather data on ocean tides and currents for use in survey optimisation, underwater mooring design, and offshore deployments. Additionally, it will be able to launch, moor, and maintain independent sonobuoys as well as gather data from them. The ship will be able to conduct acoustic system experiments at various speed regimes while remaining silent due to its broad speed range. The ARS will also be equipped with a dynamic positioning system that will enable it to hold its place until Sea State 4. The keel laying of the ship was conducted on 15 October 2025, with delivery expected in 2027. Being the first silent-class ship to be built in India, it will be capable of deploying and towing various equipment such as acoustic modules, generating sound velocity profiles, collecting ocean data, underwater moored systems, and other facilities for various sea trials.

On 2 June 2025, GRSE signed a Memorandum of Understanding (MoU) with a Norweign firm Kongsberg in Oslo for the development of India's first Polar Research Vessel (PRV). This is expected to meet the requirements of the National Centre for Polar and Ocean Research (NCOPR). In 2023, Union Minister Kiren Rijiju had informed the Rajya Sabha that India's first Polar Research Vessel (PRV) was expected to be developed within five years, at an estimated cost of ₹2,600 crore (equivalent to ₹28 billion or US$300 million in 2026).

On 11 June 2025, GRSE signed a contract for 2 Coastal Research Vessel (CRV) from the Geological Survey of India. The 461-tonne deadweight (DWT) vessels will be 64 metres (210 ft) long and 12 metres (39 ft) wide. The ships will have an endurance of 15 days and a maximum speed of 10 knots. They will be capable of accommodating up to 35 personnel on board. The vessels — to be equipped with laboratories for data processing and sample analysis — will be capable of multiple roles like geological mapping, mineral exploration, ocean environment monitoring, and scientific research and will operate inside Indian EEZ at depths of 500–1,000 m (1,600–3,300 ft). The vessels will be powered by diesel electric propulsion and will feature a dynamic positioning system for operations in Sea State 3 conditions. The keel laying ceremony of the two vessels was conducted on 15 September 2026.

=== Naval vessels ===
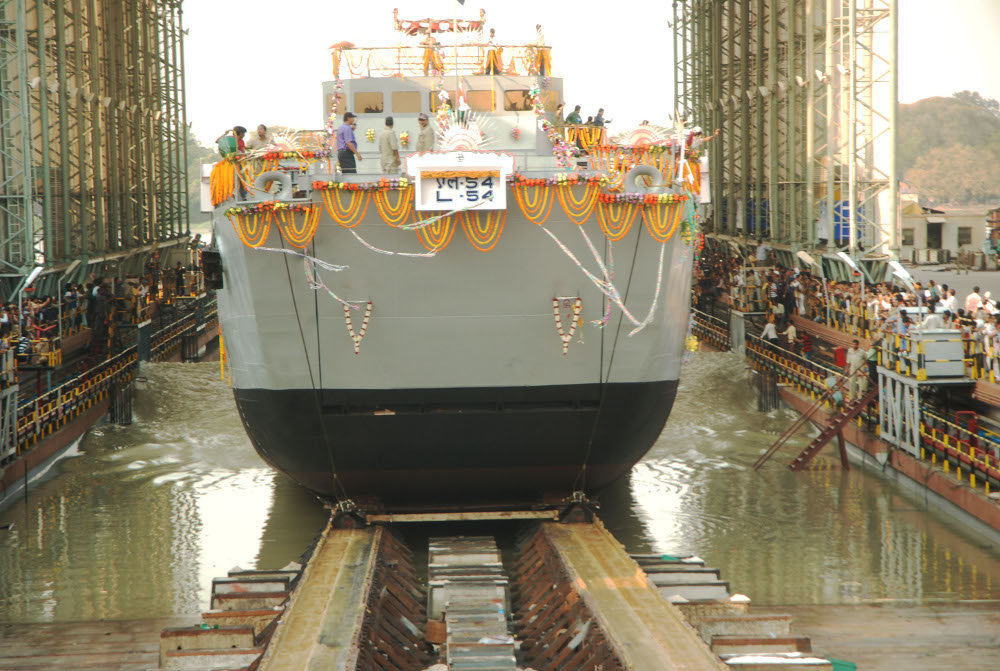
Launching ceremony of the fourth vessel under Landing Craft Utility (LCU) Mk IV project, 23 Mar 2011.

By November 2016, GRSE had delivered 98 ships to the Indian Armed Forces. As of March 2024, GRSE has designed and built 108 warships and patrol vessels for the Indian Navy and the Coast Guard for the last 63 years. Vessels built at GRSE include guided-missile frigates, corvettes, fleet tankers, fast patrol vessels, amphibious warfare vessels and hovercraft. The 100th ship to be built by the shipyard, LCU L-56 from the Mk. IV LCU project, was delivered to the Indian Navy on 30 March 2019.

It was the first instance on 30 March 2026 when GRSE delivered three warships to the Indian Navy simultaneously. The triplet included INS Sanshodhak, a Sandhayak-class survey vessel; INS Dunagiri, a Nilgiri-class frigate; and INS Agray, an Arnala-class ASW SWC. They were commissioned on 21 June 2026 in Kolkata.

GRSE has built the following notable warships for the Indian Navy.

- Aditya-class auxiliary ship
- Brahmaputra-class frigates
- Khukri-class corvette
- Kora-class corvettes
- Kamorta-class corvettes
- Patrol vessels include Seaward, Trinkat, Bangaram, and Car Nicobar classes.
- Landing Ship Tanks include Magar and Shardul classes.
- Landing craft utility vessels include Mk. IV LCU (contract in September 2011 for ₹2,176 crore).
- Survey vessels include Sandhayak-class (1981).

As of September 2025, 13 warships for the Indian Navy are under construction in the shipyard. This includes six Anti-Submarine Warfare Shallow Water Craft, two Nilgiri-class frigate, four Next Generation Offshore Patrol Vessels, and one Sandhayak-class survey vessel. Another contract for five Next Generation Corvettes is expected to be finalised this fiscal year.

GRSE also undertakes ship refitting operations. Some of the notable projects of the Ship Repair Division of GRSE includes: –

- Abhay-class corvette (Indian Navy)
- Sri Lankan Navy Offshore Patrol Vessel
- MCGS Barracuda (Mauritius Coast Guard)
- PS Zoroaster (Seychelles Coast Guard); twice in 2024 and 2026.
- Indian Coast Guard ships including Sarojini Naidu, Sujay, Vijaya, Priyadarshini & Sankalp
- SMPK vessels including PV Ma Ganga & CV Mahabahu

In August 2024, GRSE was undertaking the refit of 7 ICG and 2 SMPK vessels.

==== Exports ====
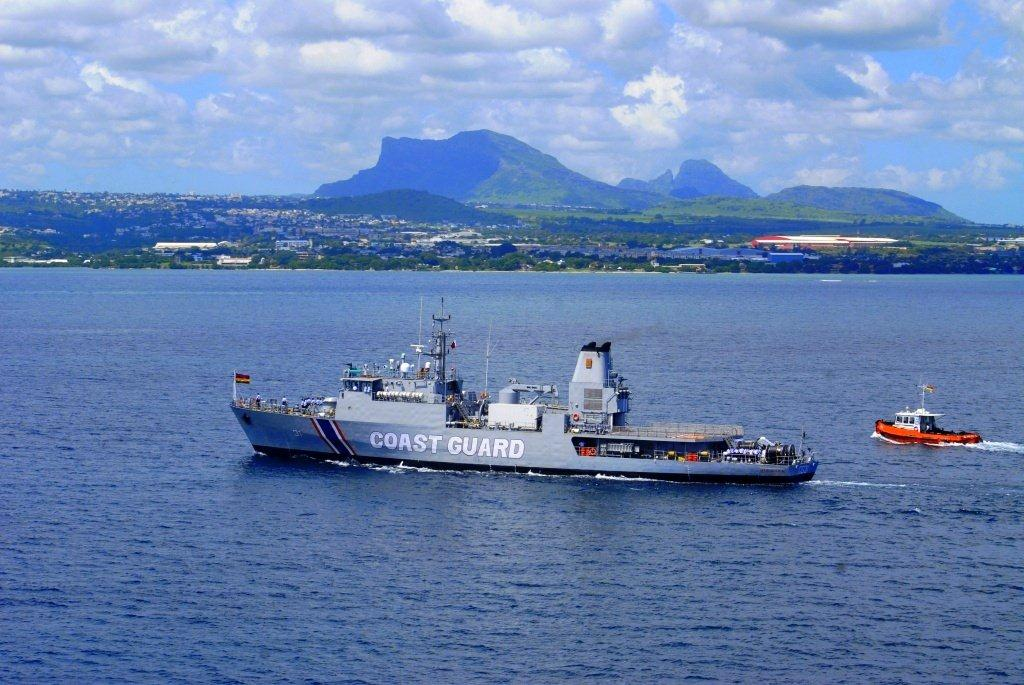
MCGS Barracuda at sea during delivery

GRSE delivered the corvette Barracuda to Mauritius on 20 December 2014. The contract was worth $58.5 million. The Mauritius offshore patrol vessel has an integrated bridge system and can support 83 member crew. It measures 74.10 metres (243.1 ft) in length and 11.40 metres (37.4 ft) in breadth and will be capable of moving at a maximum speed of 22 knots (41 km/h) with an approximate displacement of 1,350 tonnes.

GRSE has been short-listed for a patrol boat project for Vietnam worth ₹600 crore (US$64 million) and is also bidding for an order of two frigates for Philippines.

GRSE was reported to be the lowest bidder to supply two light frigates to the Philippines. A total of four firms joined the bidding for the Philippine Navy project: GRSE; Hyundai Heavy Industries Inc. and Daewoo Shipbuilding & Marine Engineering Co. Ltd., both from South Korea; and Navantia S.A. of Spain. GRSE's light frigate would have been a design based on the Indian Navy's Kamorta-class corvette.

== Joint development ==
=== Neerakshi AUV ===
On 28 July 2023, GRSE, in partnership with an MSME firm Aerospace Engineering Private Ltd. (AEPL), launched a lightweight autonomous underwater vehicle named Neerakshi (lit. 'Eyes in the Water'). The primary role of the AUV includes mine countermeasure operations including mine detection with plans for mine disposal along with secondary roles such as reusable target for anti-submarine warfare (ASW) training and deployment for passive acoustic monitoring from warships. The commercial launch of the platform was expected after six to twelve months following the Indian Navy trials.

==== Specifications ====
- Length: 2.15 m (7 ft 1 in)
- Diameter: ~0.30 m (1 ft 0 in)
- Weight: 45 kg (99 lb)
- Endurance: 4 hours
- Maximum depth: 300 m (980 ft)

=== 30 mm Naval Surface Gun ===
The Naval Surface Gun (NSG) is a 30 mm autocannon developed by GRSE in partnership with technology and production partners – Blue Horizons Strategic Engineering Limited (BHSEL) and Elbit Systems. The gun also employs an indigenous Electro Optical Fire Control System. The gun has an indigenous content of 60% and was developed within a timeframe of two years. The Sea Acceptance Trials of the gun was completed on 22 May 2025. The guns will equip the Arnala-class and Mahe-class corvettes.

Further procurement of the gun system for the Indian Navy and Coast Guard was cleared by the Defence Acquisition Council of the Ministry of Defence on 23 October 2025. The gun will be employed for low intensity maritime and anti-piracy operations.

=== Dredger development ===
On 2 September 2026, at SMM Hamburg in Germany, GRSE signed a memorandum of understanding (MoU) with Dutch shipbuilder Damen for design and development of advanced dredgers in India. Danen's technical expertise in includes trailing suction hopper dredgers and water injection dredgers. The companies are already collaborating on the construction of a 1,000-cubic-metre (35,000 cu ft) dredger for Bangladesh Inland Water Transport Corporation.

== See also ==
- List of shipbuilders and shipyards in India
- Cochin Shipyard Limited, Cochin
- Hooghly Cochin Shipyard Limited, Kolkata
- Titagarh Wagons, West Bengal
- Mazagon Dock Shipbuilders, Mumbai
- Hindustan Shipyard, Visakhapatnam
- Shalimar Works (1980) Ltd, Howrah
- Goa Shipyard
- Inland Waterways Authority of India
- Shyama Prasad Mukerjee Port, Kolkata
