= IRIS Lavan =

Iranian ship

Class overview
- Builders: Yarrow Shipbuilders Limited, Clyde
- Operators: Islamic Republic of Iran Navy
- Built: 6 February 1978 – 6 December 1979
- In service: 16 January 1985 – present

General characteristics
- Type: Landing Ship Heavy
- Displacement: 2,581 tons full load
- Length: 93 m (305 ft 1 in)
- Beam: 15 m (49 ft 3 in)
- Draught: 2.4 m (7 ft 10 in)
- Installed power: Diesel
- Speed: 14.5 knots (26.9 km/h)
- Range: 4,000 nautical miles (7,400 km) at 12 knots (22 km/h)
- Complement: 80

IRIS Lavan is a Hengam-class landing ship. The ship is named after Lavan island in Iran. It has hull number 514 and was laid down on 6 February 1978. The ship was launched on 6 December 1979 and was commissioned on 16 January 1985.

== In 2026 Iran war ==
In February 2026, Lavan participated at the International Fleet Review 2026 held at the Indian port of Visakhapatnam. Following the Fleet Review on 18 February, the ship docked at the Indian port on 20 February. On the same day, the Commander of the Iranian Navy, Commodore Shahram Irani, who was on a visit to India for participating in various events including the Fleet Review, Indian Ocean Naval Symposium and the 2026 Milan exercise, met the Indian Chief of the Naval Staff, Admiral Dinesh K Tripathi. India granted refuge to the Iranian warship, IRIS Lavan, which docked at Kochi amid heightened regional tensions following the sinking of another Iranian vessel, IRIS Dena, in the Indian Ocean. The request was received on 28 February 2026, suggesting that docking at Kochi was urgent due to the ship's technical problems. Approval was granted on 1 March, and IRIS Lavan subsequently docked at Kochi on 4 March. Its crew of 183 personnel were accommodated at naval facilities in Kochi.

The Indian authorities plans to repatriate the crew of the ship to Iran according to a Wion report on 13 March. Around 100 crew members have left the country through INS Garuda on a specially chartered Turkish Airlines flight on 14 March. The personnel departed on board an aircraft that arrived at Kochi from Colombo. A skeleton crew of 50 sailors remained on the ship.
