= International Fleet Review =

International Fleet Review may refer to:

- International Fleet Review 2001, a President's fleet review in India, commemorating the 50th anniversary of the republic
- International Fleet Review 2005, UK
- International Fleet Review 2013, Australia
- International Fleet Review 2016, India
- International Fleet Review 2025, Papua New Guinea on 4 September led INS Kadmatt (P29).
- International Fleet Review 2025, Sri Lanka in late November commemorating 75th anniversary of the Sri Lanka Navy.
- International Fleet Review 2026, India
