= Milan (naval exercise) =

Multilateral Indian Navy exercise

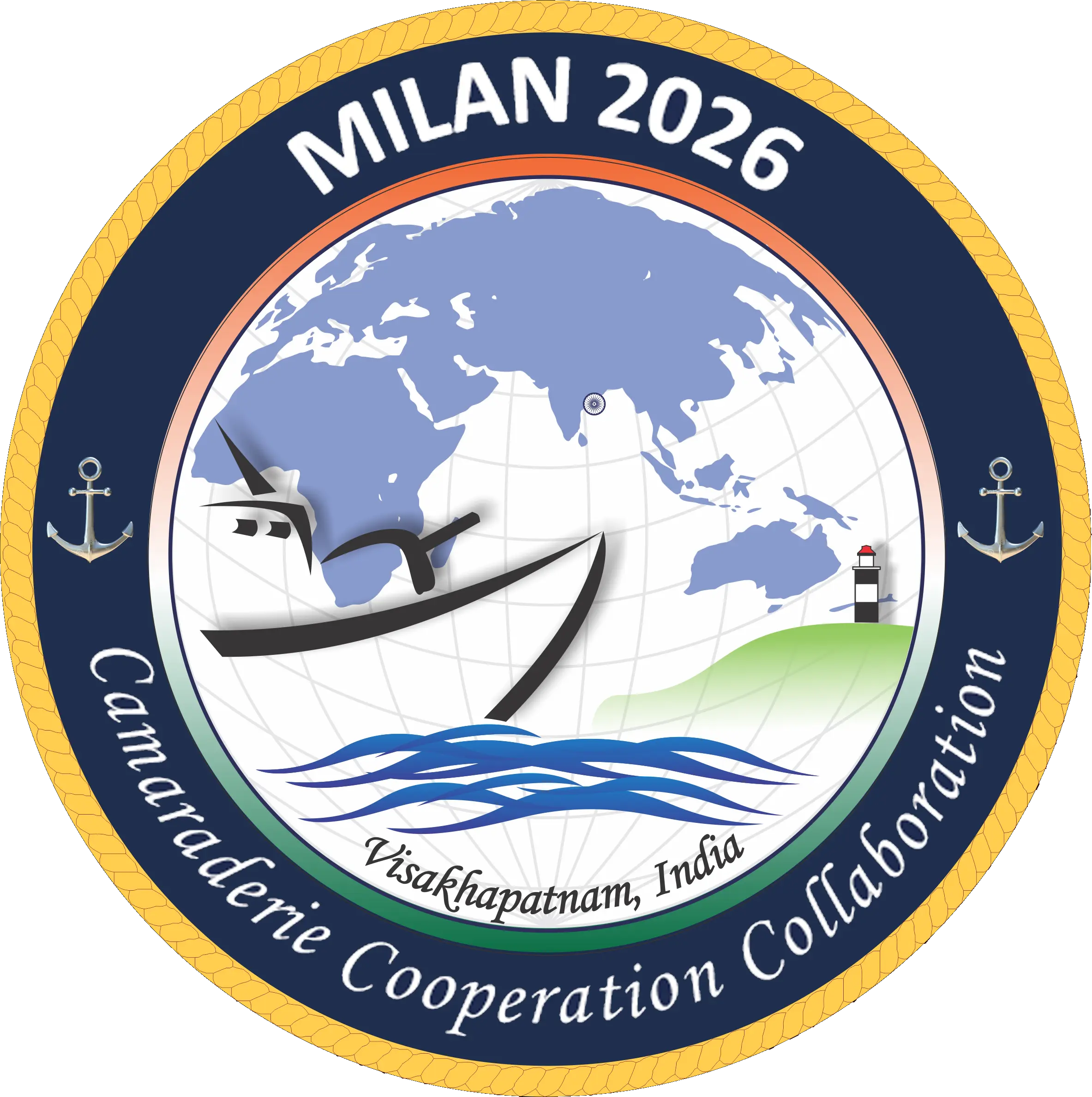
- Milan 2026 logo
- Official Website: www.in-milan.in

Milan (Hindi: Milan, lit. "Meeting", "Unification", or "Confluence") is a multilateral naval exercise hosted by the Indian Navy. The biennial event features professional exercises and seminars, social events and sporting fixtures between participating nations.

Milan was first held in 1995. Apart from the Indian Navy, the navies of Indonesia, Singapore, Sri Lanka and Thailand participated in the inaugural edition. All editions of Milan had been hosted under the aegis of the Andaman and Nicobar Command and were held in the Andaman and Nicobar Islands. In 2020, the Navy decided to hold the next edition of Milan in Visakhapatnam, Andhra Pradesh under the Eastern Naval Command. The decision was made as Visakhapatnam had more infrastructure and sea space for the exercise.

Seventeen nations, including India, participated in Milan 2014 making it the biggest edition of the event at the time. The most recent edition of Milan was held at Port Blair from 6–13 March 2018. Sixteen foreign nations participated in the event. The 2020 edition of Milan would have been the largest edition of the exercise with 30 foreign navies confirming their participation. However, the Indian Navy postponed the exercise in early March 2020 due to the coronavirus pandemic.

Milan 2022 involved the participation of 42 foreign countries, with 13 sending warships and 39 sending delegations.

== Editions ==
Milan was first held in 1995. Since then, the event has been held biennially except for 2001, 2005, 2016, and 2020. The 2001 and 2016 editions were not held because of the International Fleet Review; the 2005 event was postponed to 2006 due to the 2004 Indian Ocean earthquake and tsunami; and the 2020 edition was cancelled due to the COVID-19 pandemic. The following table lists every edition of Milan and the countries that participated in the edition. Indonesia, Singapore, Sri Lanka and Thailand have participated in every edition of the exercise.

Countries participating for the first time are in italics.

S. No.	Date	Participants
1	1995	Indonesia, Singapore, Sri Lanka and Thailand
2	1997	Bangladesh, Indonesia, Malaysia, Singapore, Sri Lanka and Thailand
3	1999	Bangladesh, Indonesia, Malaysia, Singapore, Sri Lanka and Thailand
-	2001	Not held due to the International Fleet Review 2001
4	2003	Australia, Bangladesh, Indonesia, Malaysia, Myanmar, Singapore, Sri Lanka and Thailand
-	2005	Postponed to 2006 due to the December 2004 Indian Ocean earthquake and tsunami.
5	2006	Australia, Bangladesh, Indonesia, Malaysia, Myanmar, Singapore, Sri Lanka and Thailand
6	2008	Australia, Bangladesh, Indonesia, Malaysia, Myanmar, Singapore, Sri Lanka and Thailand
7	2010	Australia, Bangladesh, Indonesia, Malaysia, Myanmar, Singapore, Sri Lanka and Thailand
8	2012	Australia, Bangladesh, Brunei, Cambodia, Indonesia, Malaysia, Maldives, Mauritius, Myanmar, New Zealand, Philippines, Seychelles, Singapore, Sri Lanka, Thailand, Vietnam
9	4-9 February 2014	Australia, Bangladesh, Brunei, Cambodia, Kenya, Indonesia, Malaysia, Maldives, Mauritius, Myanmar, New Zealand, Philippines, Seychelles, Singapore, Sri Lanka, Tanzania, Thailand, Vietnam
-	2016	Not held due to the International Fleet Review 2016.
10	6-13 March 2018	Australia, Bangladesh, Cambodia, Indonesia, Kenya, Malaysia, Mauritius, Myanmar, New Zealand, Oman, Seychelles, Singapore, Sri Lanka, Tanzania, Thailand, Vietnam
-	18-28 March 2020	Postponed due to the COVID-19 pandemic.
11	25 February-4 March 2022	Warships: Australia, Bangladesh, France, Indonesia, Japan, Malaysia, Myanmar, Seychelles, Singapore, South Korea, Sri Lanka, United States, Vietnam; 39 delegations including Brunei, Egypt, Iran, Iraq, Israel, Kenya, Kuwait, Maldives, Mauritius, Oman, Philippines, Qatar, Russia, Saudi Arabia, Tanzania, Thailand, United Kingdom, UAE
12	19–27 February 2024	Warships: Australia, Bangladesh, France, Indonesia, Iran, Japan, Malaysia, Mauritius, Myanmar, Russia, Seychelles, Sri Lanka, Thailand, United States, Vietnam; 51 delegations including Brunei, Egypt, Iraq, Israel, Kenya, Kuwait, Maldives, Oman, Philippines, Qatar, Saudi Arabia, Singapore, South Korea, Tanzania, United Kingdom, UAE
13	19–25 February 2026	Hosted simultaneously with the International Fleet Review 2026. Warships: 18 ships from friendly foreign countries and 24 Indian Naval Ships and submarines. 29 aircraft from India, Germany, France and the USA. Navy Chiefs and Naval Delegations from 74 countries.

== 2022 ==
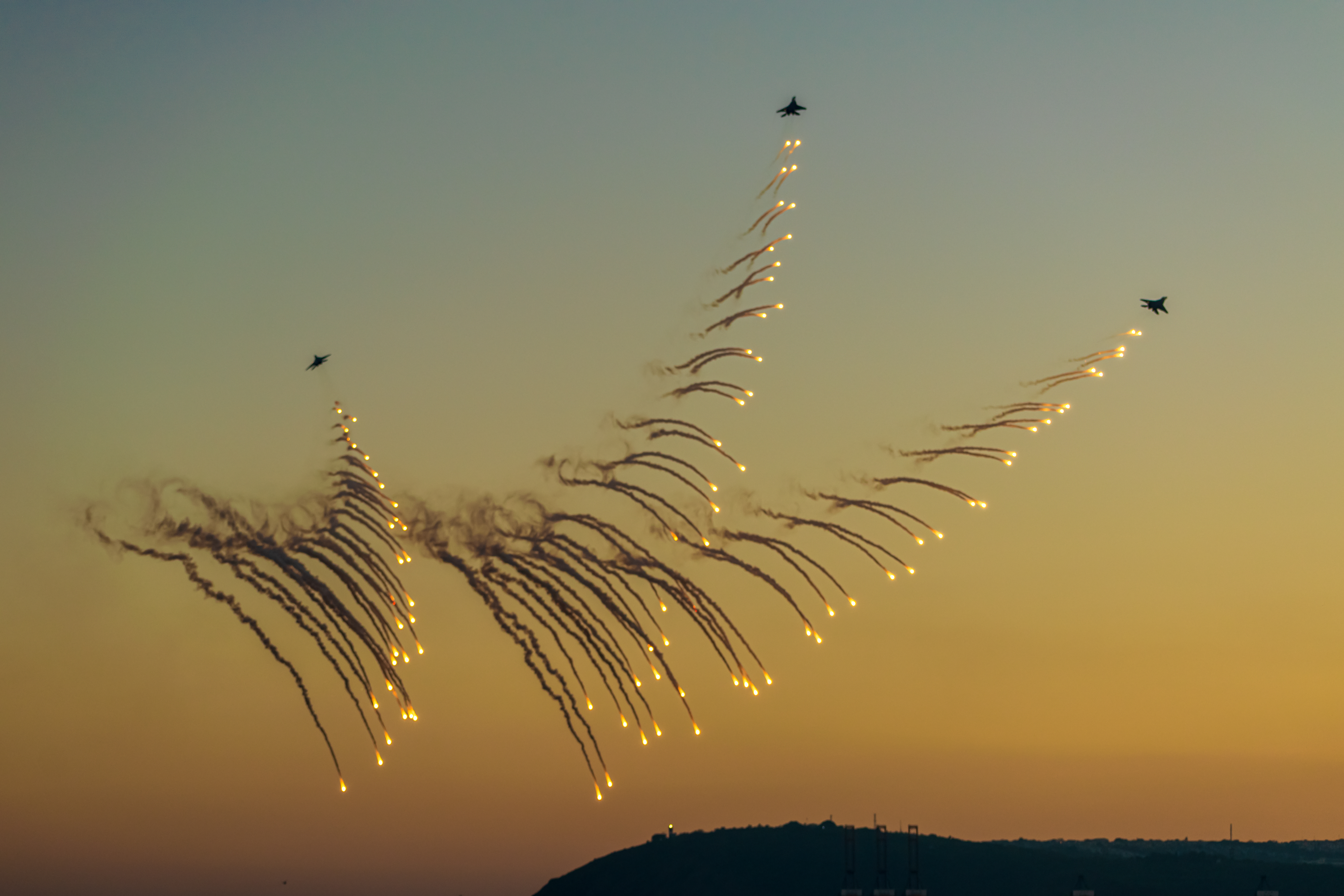
MIG aircraft lit up the sky as a part of air show demonstration with dolphin nose hill as background during MILAN2022 in Visakhapatnam

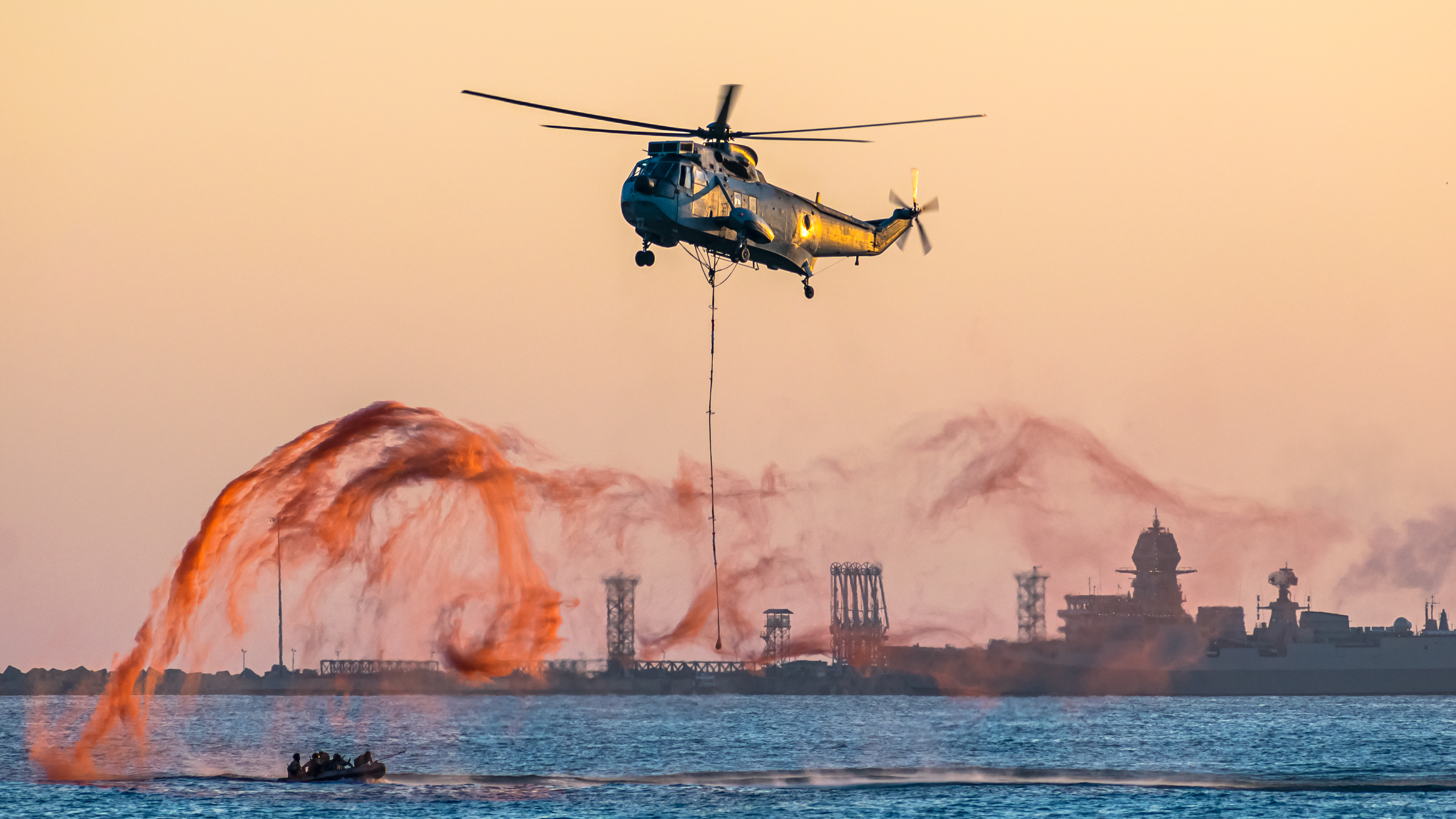
Indian Naval helicopter deflecting the smoke with INS Visakhapatnam in background during air show demonstration as a part of MILAN2022 in Visakhapatanam

The 11th edition of Milan was held from 25 February to 4 March 2022 in Visakhapatnam. It was the largest edition of the exercise, and was the first time it was held in Visakhapatnam under the Eastern Naval Command. The theme of the edition was "Camaraderie – Cohesion – Collaboration". The Indian Navy had invited 46 nations to participate including all Quad nations. Forty-two countries confirmed their participation. Thirteen nations sent warships to attend the Milan 2022 exercise, while 39 nations were represented by delegations. A total of 26 ships (13 foreign and 13 Indian Navy), 21 aircraft and 1 submarine participated in the exercise.

The 2022 edition included a harbour phase (25-28 February) followed by a sea phase (1-4 March). The Indian Navy stated that a "series of complex and advanced exercises were undertaken in all three dimensions of naval operations to enhance compatibility, interoperability, mutual understanding and maritime cooperation amongst the partner navies". The sea phase involved underway replenishment, anti-submarine exercises involving aircraft, surface target firings and simulation of complex operational scenarios. During the first two days of the sea phase, the navies conducted anti-warfare drills including a United States Navy Boeing P-8 Poseidon aircraft shepherding a strike by Indian fighter aircraft on a formation of warships. The navies also conducted weapons firings against low-flying air targets. Over the next days of the sea phase, cross-deck landing operations were conducted during helicopter operations and fleet tanker INS Shakti (A57) conducted underway replenishment for the ships of the participating navies.

The 2022 edition was formally inaugurated by Minister of State for Defence Ajay Bhatt at the Naval Auditorium in Visakhapatnam on 26 February. The event was also attended by Admiral R. Hari Kumar, and the Ambassadors, High Commissioners, Chiefs of Navies, delegation heads of participating countries, and the Commanding Officers and crew of all participating ships. As part of the exercise, a "MILAN village" was established at the Tarang Naval Institute to showcase Indian handicrafts, cuisine and arts, particularly from the host state of Andhra Pradesh, and serve as a venue for social interaction and cultural exchange between the participants. Other events during Milan 2022 included an operational demonstration by the Indian Navy followed by an International City Parade (including foreign contingents) on the evening of 27 February, an international maritime seminar with the theme - "Harnessing Collective Maritime Competence through Collaboration" on 27–28 February, professional/subject matter expert exchanges, deep-submergence rescue vehicle demonstration, meeting of younger officers, sporting events, and cultural visits to Agra and Bodh Gaya.

The closing ceremony was held onboard INS Jalashwa (L41) and was led by Rear Admiral Sanjay Bhalla, Flag Officer Commanding Eastern Fleet. The Commanding Officers of the participating ships arrived onboard Jalashwa by helicopters and boats, and conducted a debrief on the exercise. Commanding officer of the USS Fitzgerald, Cmdr. David Catterall, stated that Milan provided an opportunity for "like-minded navies that sharing a common vision of a more stable, open, and prosperous Indo-Pacific, to operate and train alongside one another". He added, "We are grateful for India's hosting this important event and their efforts to harmonize our contributions to the region, and look forward to ensuring future engagements to build strong alliances and partnerships."

Participating foreign ships:

- Australia - HMAS Arunta (FFH 151)
- Bangladesh - BNS Umar Farooq
- France - FS Loire
- Indonesia - KRI Eddy Martadinata
- Japan - JS Yūdachi (DD-103)
- Malaysia - KD Lekiu (FFG30)
- Myanmar - UMS King Sin Phyu Shin
- Seychelles - SCG PS Zoroaster
- Singapore - RSS Tenacious
- South Korea - ROKS Gwangju (FFG-817)
- Sri Lanka - SLNS Sayurala
- United States - USS Fitzgerald, VP-47 Boeing P-8A Poseidon
- Vietnam - HQ-16 Quang Trung

== 2024 ==
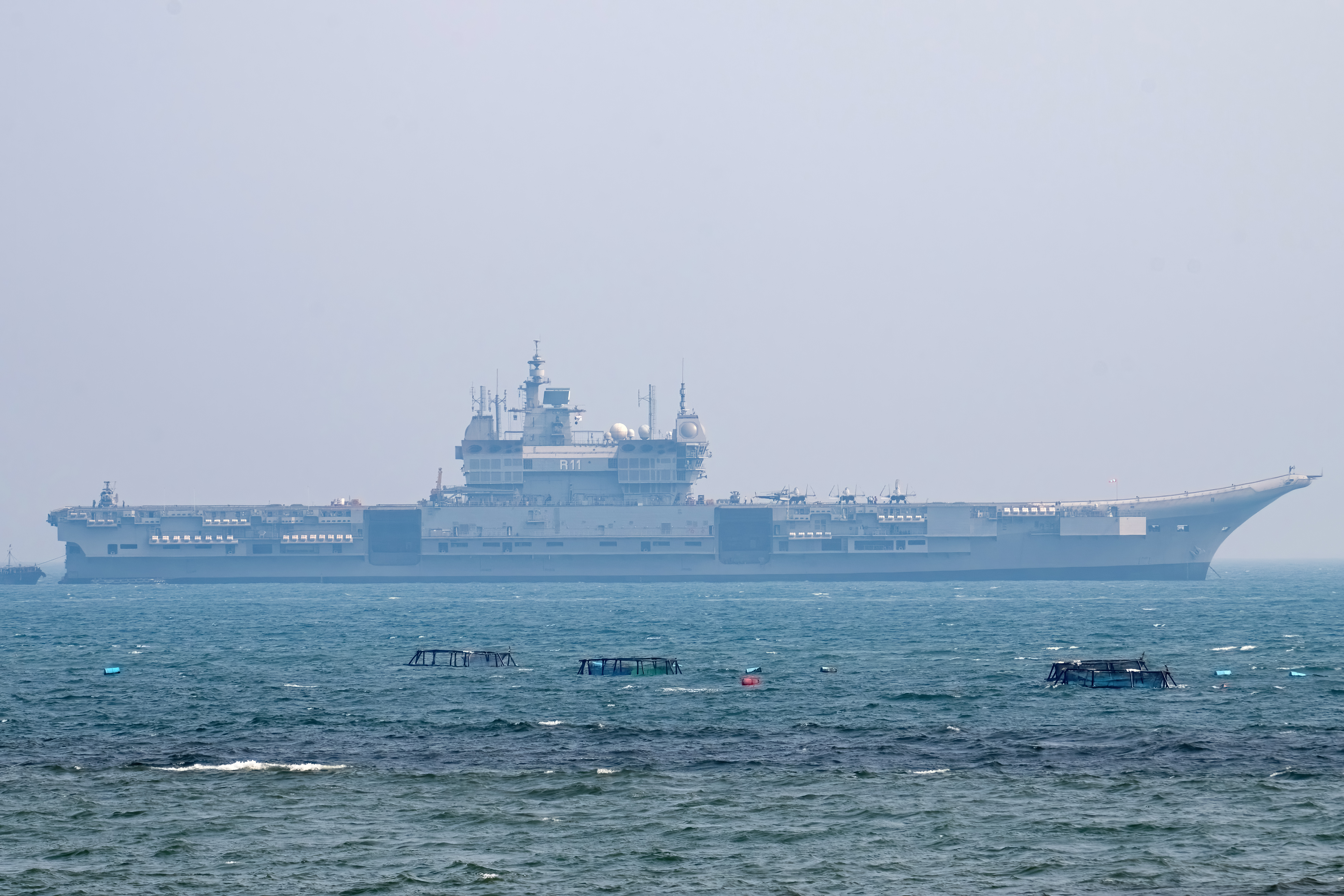
INS Vikrant of the Indian Navy during MILAN 2024, Visakhapatnam

Participating foreign naval assets:

- Australia - HMAS Warramunga (FFH 152)
- Bangladesh - BNS Dhaleshwari
- France - Bréguet Atlantique2 (Maritime patrol aircraft)
- Indonesia - KRI Sultan Iskandar Muda
- Iran - IRIS Dena
- Japan - JS Sazanami
- Malaysia - KD Lekir (F-26)
- Mauritius - MCGS Victory
- Myanmar - UMS King Sin Phyu Shin
- Russia - Varyag, Marshal Shaposhnikov, Boris Butoma
- Seychelles - SCG PS Zoroaster
- Sri Lanka - SLNS Sayurala
- Thailand - HTMS Prachuap Khiri Khan
- United States - USS Halsey
- Vietnam - HQ 20

== See also ==
- Exercise Malabar
- Exercise Indra
- Exercise Varuna
- Africa-India Key Maritime Engagement
