= International Fleet Review 2026 =

2026 naval review in Visakhapatnam, India

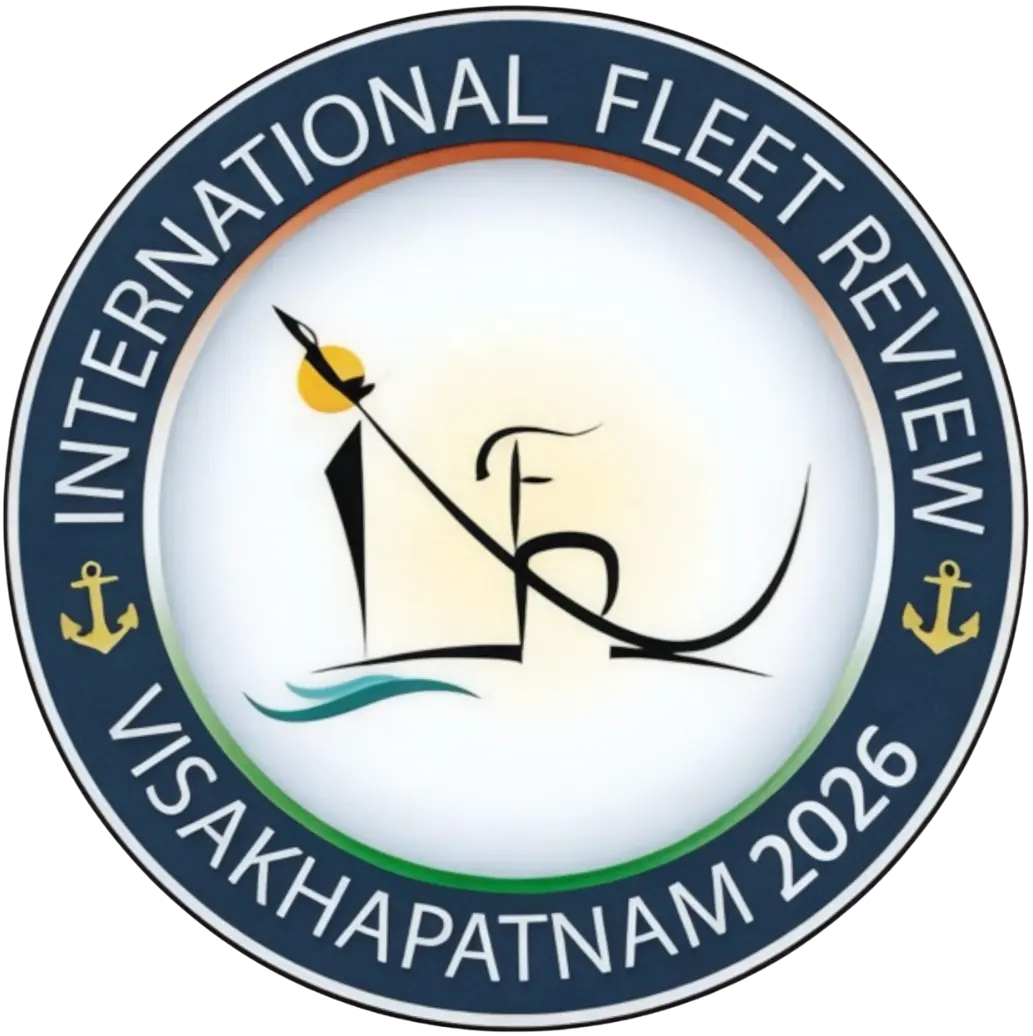
- IFR 2026 logo

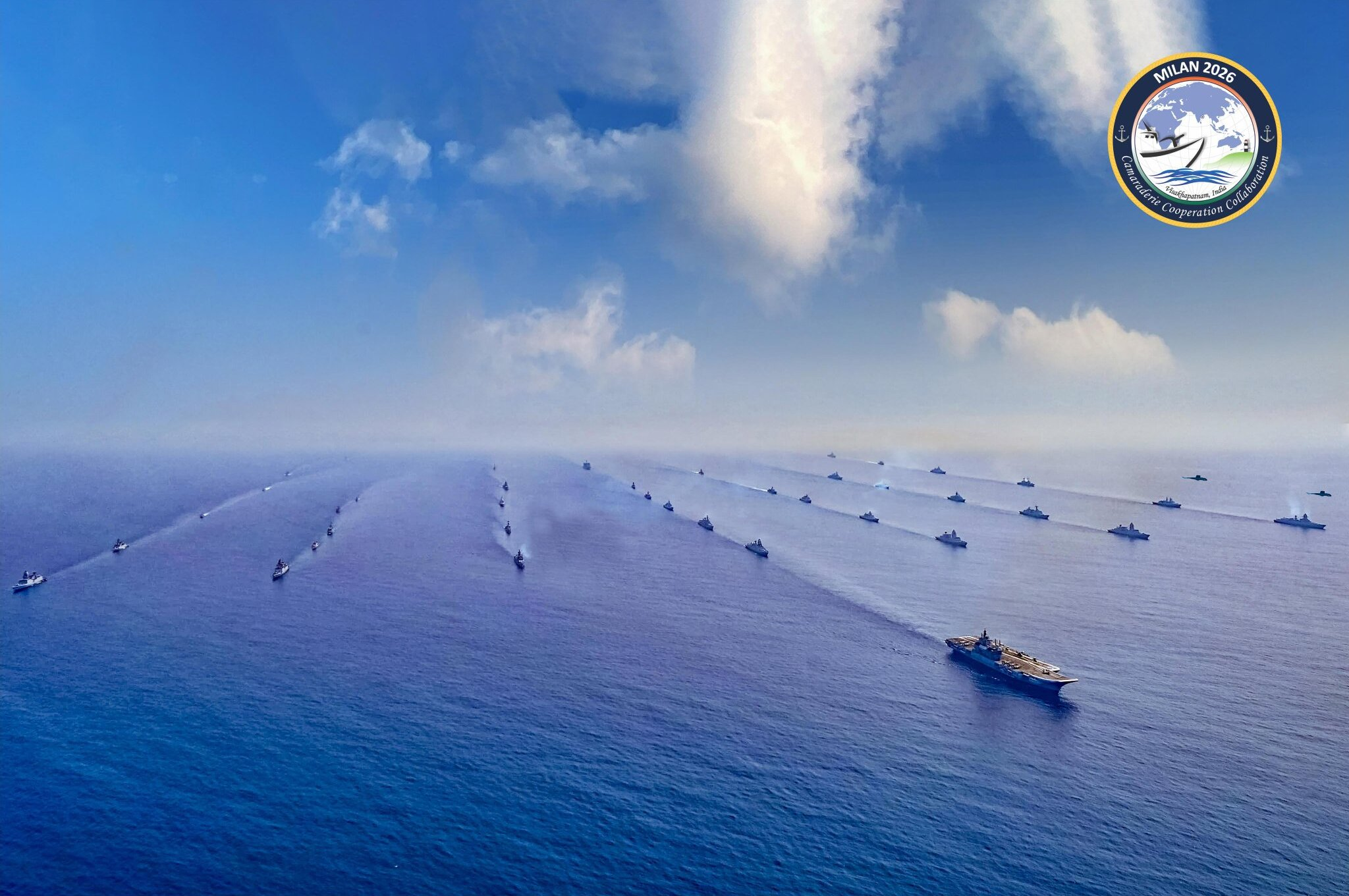
- Ships in the fleet review and MILAN exercise
- Date: 15–25 February 2026
- Duration: 11 days
- Venue: Eastern Naval Command
- Location: Visakhapatnam, India; 17.695811°N 83.280709°E
- Also known as: IFR 2026
- Type: Fleet review Naval exercise
- Theme: United Through Oceans
- Patron: Government of India
- Organised by: Indian Navy
- Participants: 66 ships from the Indian Navy, Indian Coast Guard, Shipping Corporation of India and National Institute of Ocean Technology; 19 ships and 45 marching contingents from 65 foreign navies and 74 nations; 60+ aircraft from three countries
- Website: www.ifrmilan26.com

The International Fleet Review 2026 (IFR 2026) was an international maritime exercise hosted and conducted by the Indian Navy on behalf of the President of India in February 2026 to improve relations with other navies in the region. The IFR 2026, along with MILAN, is the largest maritime assembly hosted by India since its independence.

== Background ==
The 2026 International Fleet Review is a cooperative maritime exercise held in India. It aims to enhance co-operation and promote local maritime capabilities. This is the third IFR being hosted by India after the International Fleet Review 2001 and the International Fleet Review 2016 which were conducted during the presidency of K. R. Narayanan and Pranab Mukherjee, respectively. In 2001, 97 ships from 20 countries participated in the event, while the 2016 edition saw 95 ships and over 50 countries.

The President's fleet review, also called the Presidential fleet review, is a gathering of naval ships for observation by the President of India who reviews the fleet of the Indian Navy. Past fleet reviews in India include a 2006 review conducted by president A. P. J. Abdul Kalam, which was the first public naval fleet review outside Mumbai. The last review was in 2022 during the Presidency of Ram Nath Kovind.

Two other notable international fleet reviews were held before 2016: the International Fleet Review 2005 in the United Kingdom and the International Fleet Review 2013 in Australia. IFR 2016 was the second international fleet review conducted in India; the first, in Mumbai in 2001, had 29 participants. A total of 95 warships from 50 navies, including the Indian Navy, participated in IFR 2016.

During a press conference in the presence of the Chief of the Naval Staff (CNS), Admiral Dinesh Kumar Tripathi, on 31 October 2025, the Indian Navy announced three major events that would be hosted in February 2026. This included the International Fleet Review 2026, Exercise MILAN 2026 and the Indian Ocean Naval Symposium (IONS) Conclave of Chiefs. The events were hosted 15–25 February 2016. Exercise MILAN is Indian Navy's flagship biennial multilateral naval exercise. India also hosts the chair of the IONS for the second time between 2025 and 2027 which has 25 members and 9 observers along with other invitees. The events also include the International City Parade. On 14 and 15 February, the Indian Navy, along with the Indian Army, conducted a full dress rehearsal for amphibious assault operations by BMP-2s at RK Beach in Visakhapatnam ahead of the IFR and City Parade.

== Events ==
=== 16 February ===
The Flag Officer Commanding-in-Chief Eastern Naval Command (FOC-in-C ENC), Vice Admiral Sanjay Bhalla, inaugurated the MILAN Village which was established within the premises of INS Satavahana. The commanding officer described the events as the largest maritime assembly hosted by India since 1947. This also marked the beginning of the three events.

=== 17 February ===
The IFR formally commenced with a Presidential Banquet at the Visakhapatnam Naval Base and a ceremonial band performance at the Eastern Naval Command officers’ mess. A full dress rehearsal for the Fleet Review was conducted on the day. INS Sukanya hosted the families of naval personnel to witness the event. While the ships were anchored in six columns, Sukanya passed the ships in between the columns imitating the course of the presidential yacht the following day.

=== 18 February ===
The International Fleet Review was conducted by the President of India, Droupadi Murmu, in the presence of Governor of Andhra Pradesh S Abdul Nazeer and Andhra Pradesh Chief Minister N Chandrababu Naidu.

The President initially received a Ceremonial Guard of Honour from a 150 personnel contingent and a 21-gun salute. Thereafter, she and the guests boarded INS Sumedha which served as the presidential yacht. The ship was adorned with the Ashoka Emblem and flew the Presidential Standard. During the Fleet Review, 52 ships were anchored in six columns around 22 km (14 mi) away from Visakhapatnam. Sumedha sailed past the anchored ships while the President received salute from the naval personnel on the ships. She also reviewed the Indian Naval Air Arm which was marked by a flypast by over 60 aircraft including helicopters, fixed wing aircraft as well as an Atlantique 2 aircraft of the French Navy. Thereafter, a mobile column of warships and submarines sailed past the presidential yacht. Further maritime and waterfront demonstrations including a parade of sails, search and rescue and aerial manoeuvres by a Naval Air arm Hawk aircraft were also part of the event.

=== 19 February ===
The International City Parade, comprising 45 marching contingents and eight naval bands from across 65 foreign navies, was conducted on the Beach Road, beside RK Beach, in between the stretch of The Park Hotel and the Coastal Battery. The Governor of Andhra Pradesh, Syed Abdul Nazeer, was the chief guest and reviewed the parade. The event was hosted by the Indian Navy chief, Admiral Dinesh Tripathi. Multiple guests included State ministers, Senior Central and State Government officials, Former Navy Chiefs, Naval Chiefs and Heads of Delegations from participating friendly foreign countries and senior officers of the Indian Navy.

The march past commenced at 1600 hours IST with an air show by the Indian Naval Air Arm. Cadets of the NCC's Indian Sea Cadet Corps and the Indian Navy, followed by Korukonda Sainik School Band and Indian Air Force Band along with the marching contingents of the Indian Coast Guard, Indian Air Force, Indian Army and the Indian Navy opened the proceedings. Regiments from Australia, Bangladesh, France, Indonesia, Iran, Malaysia, Maldives, Myanmar, Philippines, Russia, Seychelles, South Africa, Sri Lanka, Thailand and Vietnam were also present during the march, tailed by state troopers from the Greyhounds and the Andra Pradesh Police and veterans organisations. The event concluded with fireworks, a laser light show and a drone display while the warships anchored off the city coast.

The MILAN exercise was inaugurated on the same day by the Defence Minister of India, Rajnath Singh. Singh addressed the Navy Chiefs and Heads of Delegations from 74 nations who would participate in the exercise. He had also interacted with the Naval Chiefs and Naval delegations from 9 ASEAN nations.

=== 20 February ===
The Indian Navy hosted the ninth edition of the Conclave of Chiefs of the Indian Ocean Naval Symposium (IONS). The Indian Navy took over the chairmanship of the IONS for the first time since 2008, from the Royal Thai Navy. The conclave included the participation of the Chief of Navies and Heads of Maritime Security Agencies of 33 member and observer states of the IONS. During the conclave, the Philippines joined as an observer while Oman joined the IONS Working Group on HADR.

The Commander of the Iranian Navy, Commodore Shahram Irani, also met the Indian Navy chief, Tripathi, while he visited India for the events. Irani emphasised the exchange of experience in long-range operations and escort missions for commercial vessels that will suit mutual interests.

== Participating ships ==
The 2026 edition of the IFR and MILAN exercise had 74 participating nations with 85 warships including 19 from foreign friendly nations. Meanwhile, the Indian fleet comprised 60 Indian Navy ships, four Indian Coast Guard vessels and one ship each from the Shipping Corporation of India and the National Institute of Ocean Technology. The Indian Naval Ships will include INS Vikrant, three submarines, Visakhapatnam-class destroyers, Nilgiri-class frigates and Arnala-class anti-submarine warfare corvettes. Maiden participants with assets includes Germany, Philippines and the UAE. Over 60 naval aircraft from three countries will also took part in the events. INS Sumedha served as the presidential yacht during the IFR on 18 February.

The first set of foreign ships, including MCGS Huravee, SCGS Zoroaster and VPNS 17 from Vietnam People's Navy, made their port call at Visakhapatnam on 12 February 2026. As of 14 February, INS Vikrant was yet to enter the Bay of Bengal. The Russian Navy will deploy a frigate of its Pacific Fleet from Muscat, Oman. The warship will make a port call at Visakhapatnam on 18 February.

The Indian Navy welcomed four warships from three Navies, including the Royal Australian Navy, the Royal Thai Navy and the Sri Lanka Navy, on 16 February. Another three ships from the Bangladesh Navy, the UAE Navy, and the Indonesian Navy arrived on 17 February. INS Vikrant also entered the harbour on this day.

=== Visibility from space ===
The six columns of 52 warships anchored off the coast of Visakhapatnam during the International Fleet Review was captured in an image clicked by the ABA First Runner (AFR) satellite of the Azista Space. INS Vikrant remained the most prominent vessel in the picture. The image also demonstrated the increasing capabilities of space-based Intelligence, Surveillance and Reconnaissance (ISR) in the Maritime Domain Awareness (MDA).

== Exercise MILAN 2026 ==
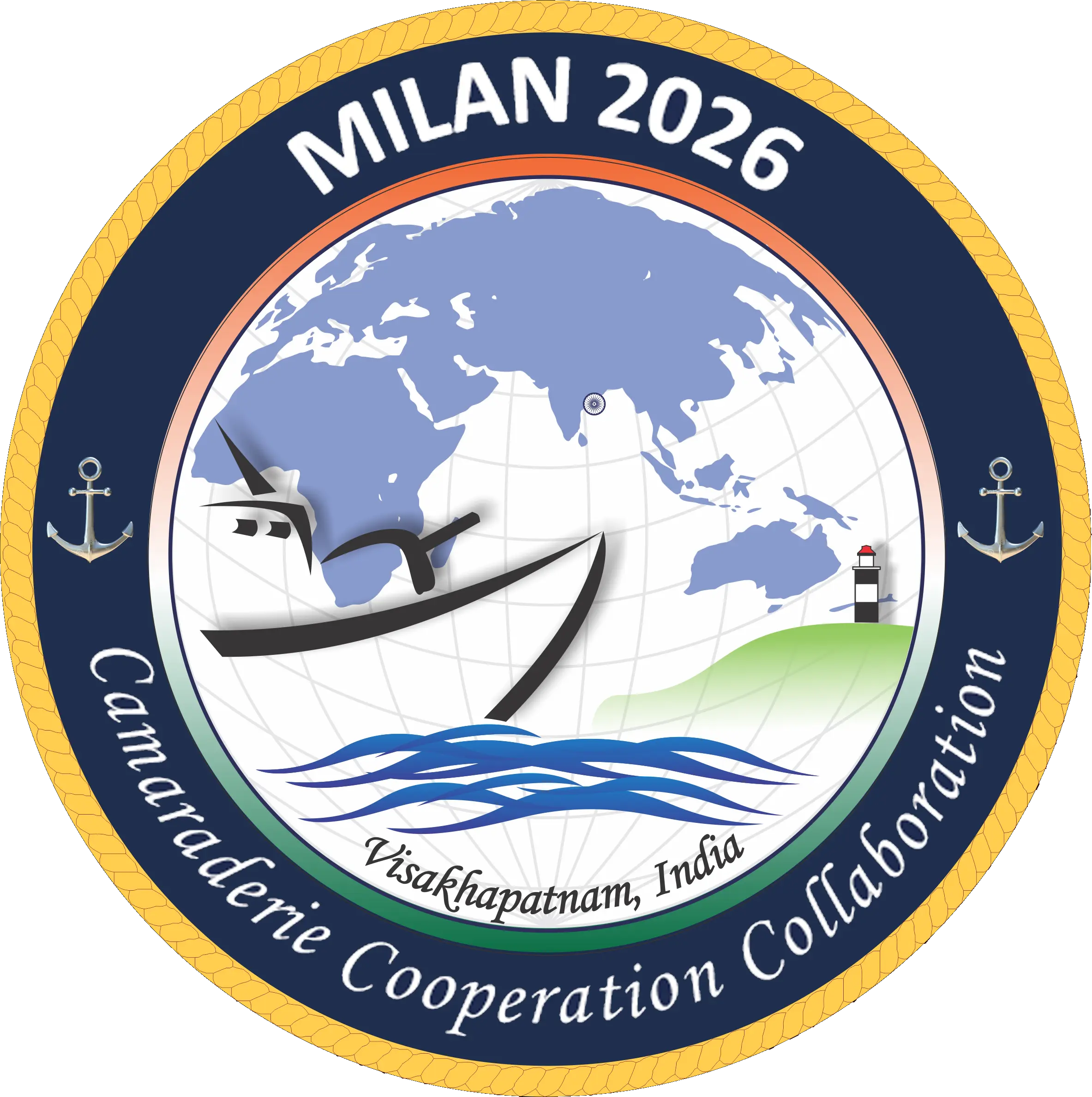
Milan 2026 commomorative logo

A total of 42 ships and submarines along with 29 aircraft participated in the exercise. It also included 18 warships from foreign friendly nations and aircraft from Germany, France and the USA.

The MILAN Village was established as a residential complex dedicatedly constructed to accommodate the naval personnel, officers and their families for the IFR and MILAN 2026 within the premises of INS Satavahana, the premier submarine training base of the force. The village also features about 50 stalls to exhibit handlooms, handicrafts, and traditional artefacts from Indian States as well as foreign navies.

The exercise was inaugurated by the Defence Minister of India, Rajnath Singh, on 19 February. The exercise will be conducted in two phases, Harbour and Sea Phase. The Harbour Phase includes multiple events including the International Maritime Seminar, cross-deck visits, sports interactions and pre-sail planning conferences among others. Meanwhile, the Sea Phase was designed to enhance maritime cooperation and interoperability. The phase will include coordinated maritime security operations, tactical manoeuvres and communication drills as well as anti-submarine warfare (ASW), air defence, and search and rescue operations.

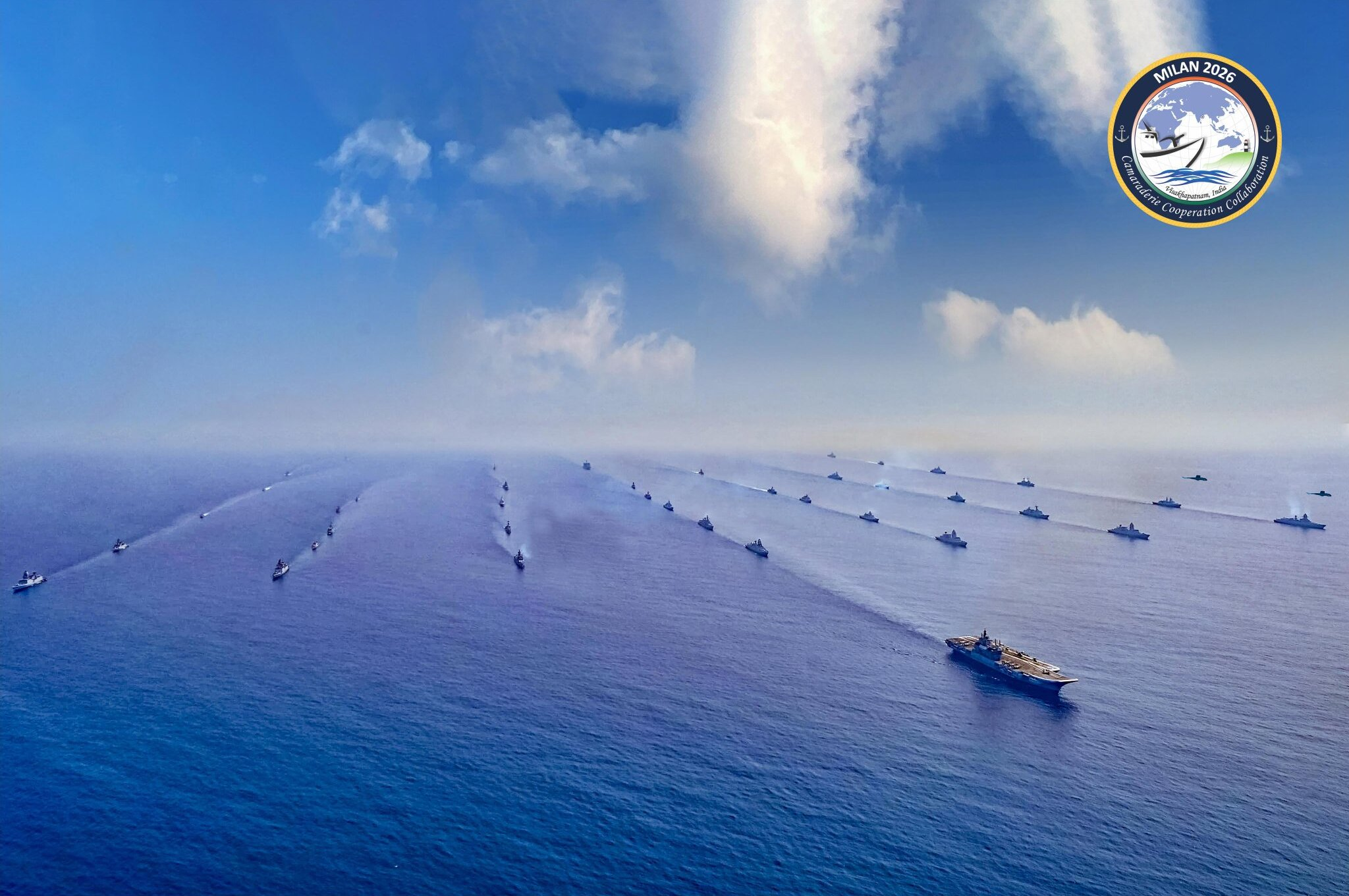
Ships in formation during Milan 2026

The sea phase of the exercise commenced on 22 February. The phase will include surface firing coordination, anti-air, anti-submarine drills along with maritime interdiction, aircraft carrier and cross-deck helicopter operations. The operations also includes anti-submarine units tasked to detect and track submarines, aerial exercise for air defence units as well as search and rescue drills.

On 25 February, the exercise culminated with a closing ceremony hosted onboard INS Vikrant off the coast of Visakhapatnam.

It was reported that the Philippine Navy ship BRP Miguel Malvar (FFG-6) was the only one to be able to detect an Indian submarine during the exercise during an anti submarine drill. This was claimed by the Armed Forces of the Philippines spokesperson for the West Philippine Sea, Rear Admiral Roy Vincent Trinidad. The Indian Navy has deployed its Sindhughosh-class submarines in the exercise.

== Post event ==
During its return journey on 4 March 2026, amid the 2026 Iran war, the participating ship from the Iranian Navy, IRIS Dena, was sunk by a US Navy submarine in international waters near the southern coast of Sri Lanka. Subsequently India allowed Iranian warship IRIS Lavan to dock at Kochi on 4 March 2026 with 183-member crew housed at naval facilities. Sri Lanka allowed another Iranian warship IRIS Bushehr to dock at Trincomalee port and housed its 208-member crew at the naval camp on 5 March 2026.

India's former chief of naval staff, Admiral Arun Prakash, commented that "It’s a bit of treachery of the US to attend a peaceful function side-by-side with Iranian navy, where there’s a lot of camaraderie, and then the moment the Iranian ship pops out of harbour, it’s sunk ... They could have delayed this action to spare India this embarrassment."

== Gallery ==
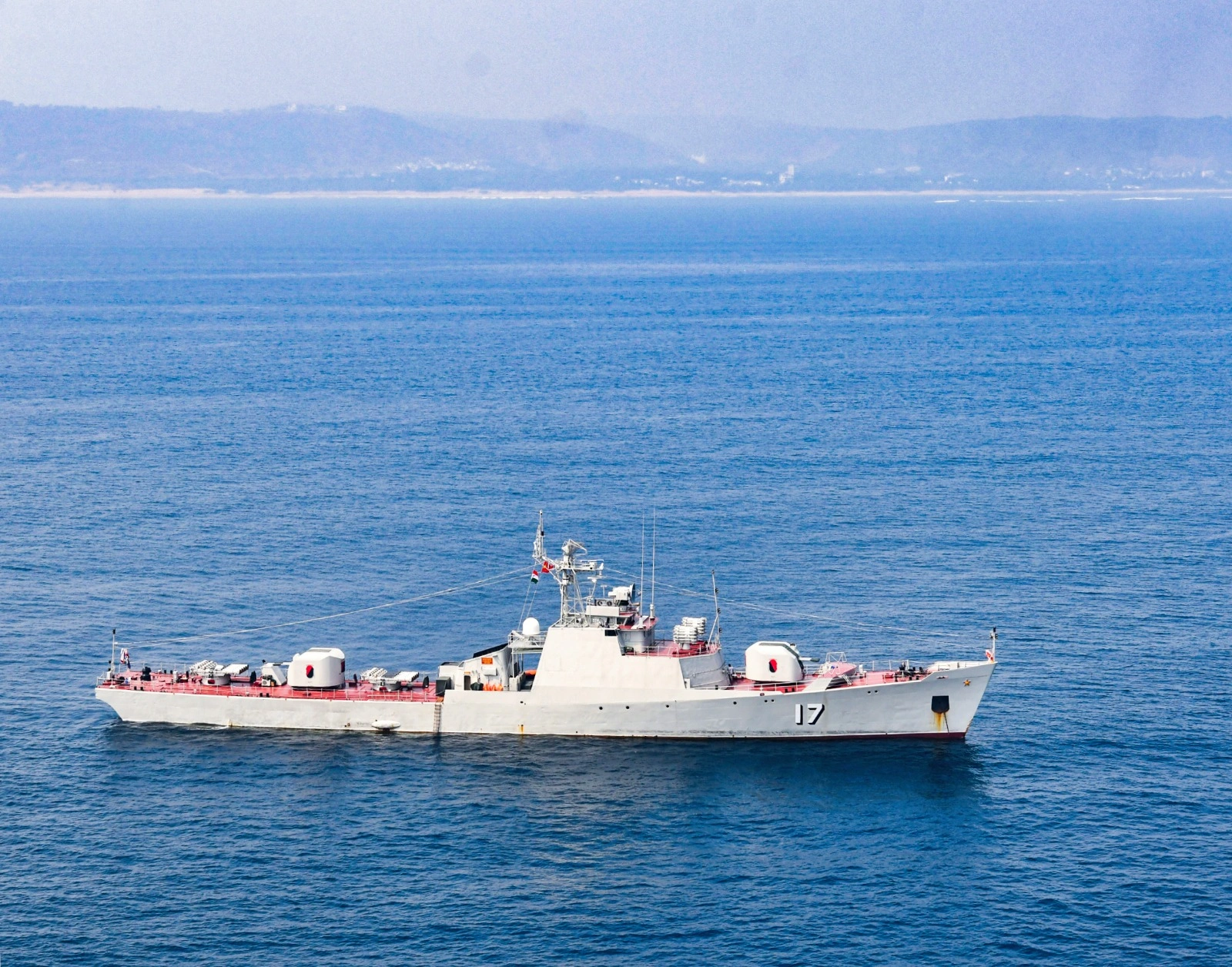
Upgraded Petya class corvette VPNS-17 of Vietnam

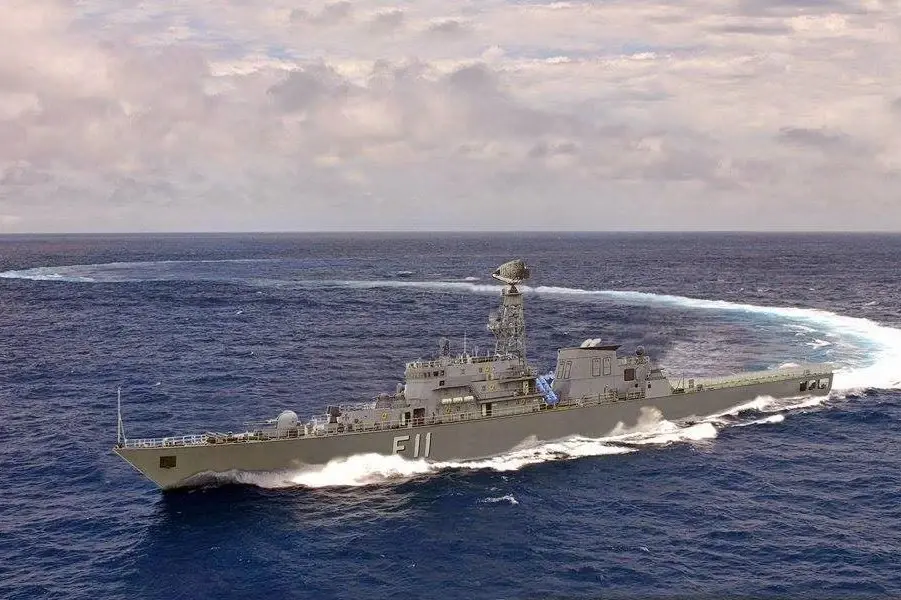
UMS King Aung Zeya from Myanmar

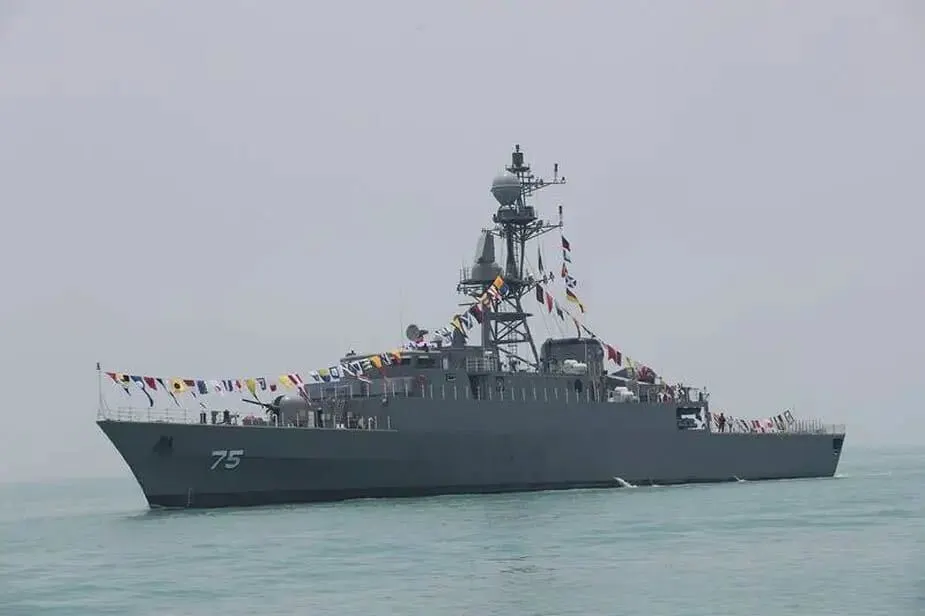
IRIS Dena from the Iranian Navy

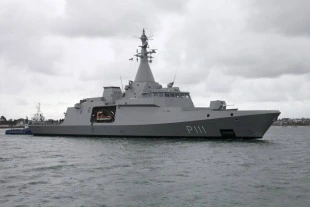
Al Emarat, a corvette of the UAE Navy, arriving in India ahead of the Fleet Review

== See also ==
- International Fleet Review 2016
- International Fleet Review 2013
- International Fleet Review 2005
- President's fleet review
- Fleet review (Commonwealth realms)
