= International Fleet Review 2016 =

Indian international maritime exercise

- Date: 4–8 February 2016
- Duration: Five days
- Venue: Eastern Naval Command
- Location: Visakhapatnam, India; 17.695811°N 83.280709°E
- Also known as: IFR 2016
- Type: Military exercise
- Theme: United through Oceans
- Patron: Government of India
- Organised by: Indian Navy
- Participants: 71 ships from the Indian Navy; 24 ships and delegations from 50 foreign navies
- Press release: GWAW15001898_IFR press release
- Publication: Ahoy IFR 2016
- Website: IFR 2016 website

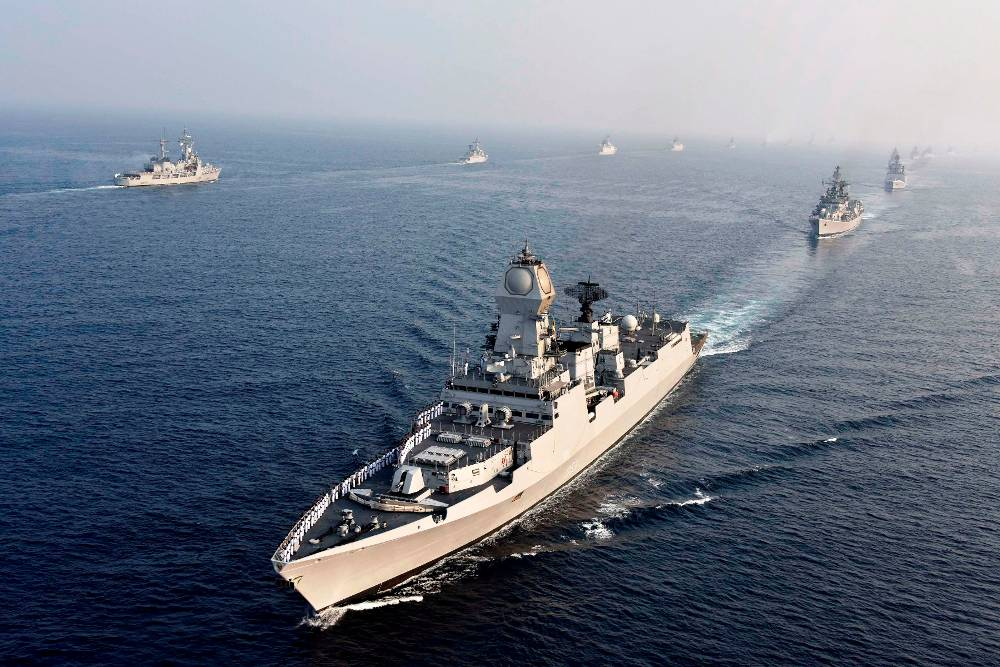
Passage Exercise (PASSEX) during Fleet Review

International Fleet Review 2016 (IFR 2016) was an international maritime exercise hosted and conducted by the Indian Navy on behalf of the President of India in February 2016 to improve relations with other navies in the region. The Indian Navy demonstrated its maritime capabilities to the foreign navies participating in the review.

The President's fleet review is a gathering of naval ships for observation by the President of India who reviews the fleet of the Indian Navy. Past fleet reviews in India include a 2006 review conducted by president A. P. J. Abdul Kalam, the first public naval fleet review outside Mumbai.

Two other notable international fleet reviews were held before 2016: the International Fleet Review 2005 in the United Kingdom and the International Fleet Review 2013 in Australia. IFR 2016 was the second international fleet review conducted in India; the first, in Mumbai in 2001, had 29 participants. A total of 95 warships from 50 navies, including the Indian Navy, participated in IFR 2016. The review, conducted from 4 to 8 February 2016 in Visakhapatnam, was organized by the Eastern Naval Command of the Indian Navy.

The next edition was conducted in 2026 when India hosted the Indian Ocean Naval Symposium (IONS).

== Announcement ==
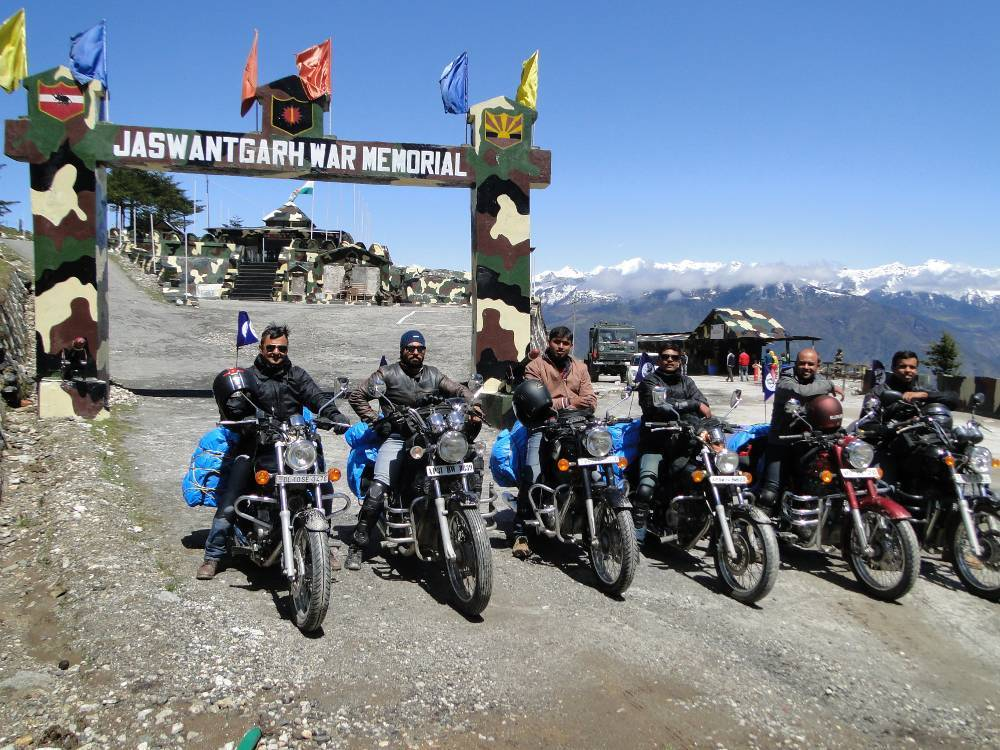
Eastern Naval Command motorcycle expedition team at the Jaswantgarh War Memorial in Arunachal Pradesh. A motorcycle expedition for the upcoming IFR began in April 2015 at Eastern Naval Command headquarters.

IFR 2016 was announced at a press conference in New Delhi on 14 October 2015. At the conference, Chief of the Naval Staff (CNS) Admiral RK Dhowan announced the Indian Navy's plan to conduct an international fleet review on the eastern seaboard at Visakhapatnam on 4–8 February 2016.

== Events ==
=== 4 February ===
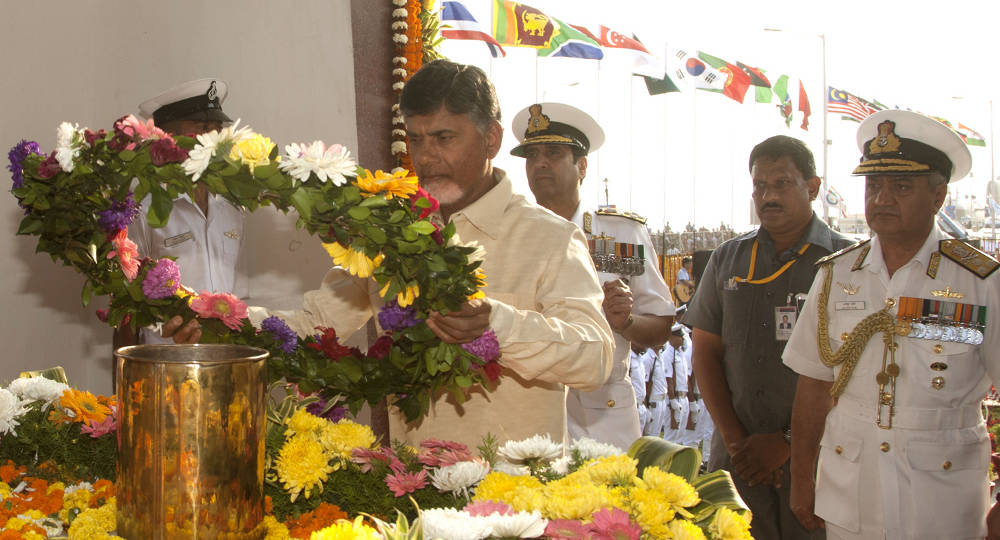
Andhra Pradesh Chief Minister N. Chandrababu Naidu paid homage to India's war dead in a wreath-laying ceremony.

A wreath-laying ceremony was held on the afternoon of 4 February at the Victory at Sea Memorial. Chief Minister of Andhra Pradesh N. Chandrababu Naidu, CNS Admiral Dhowan and Flag Officer Commanding-in-Chief Eastern Naval Command Vice Admiral Satish Soni laid a wreath in tribute to the Indian Navy sailors killed in the Indo-Pakistani War of 1971, and a guard of honour paraded. Chief of Staff, Eastern Naval Command Vice Admiral Bimal Verma and other dignitaries and representatives of foreign navies were present at the ceremony.

The maritime exhibition's theme was Make in India, showcasing the country's innovation, indigenisation and potential. With participating industries which float, move and fly, the exhibition was opened to the public on 2 February.

=== 5 February ===
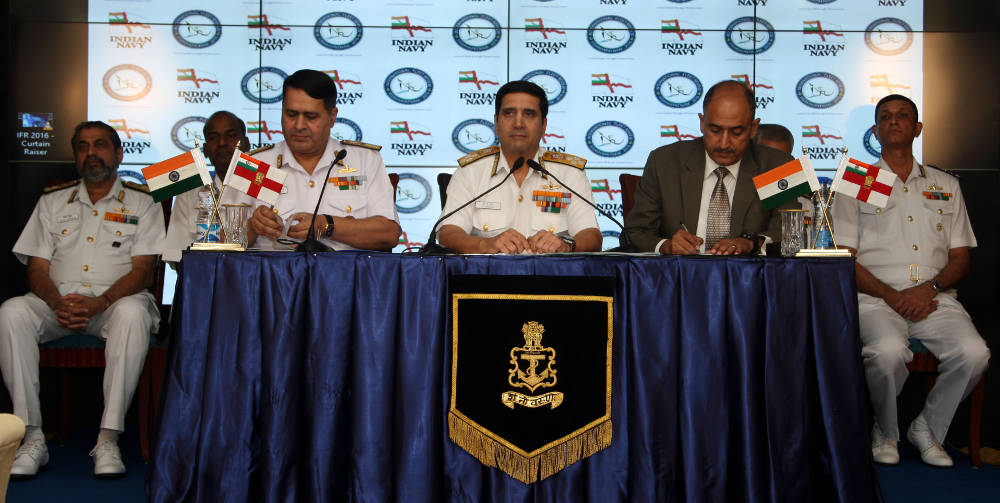
Naval Chief of Staff Admiral Robin K. Dhowan addressed the media at the IFR 2016 press conference in New Delhi.

CNS Admiral Robin K. Dhowan hosted a press conference at the Novotel Convention Centre, in which delegates from the navies participating in the review took part. An opening ceremony was held at INS Satavahana.

=== 6 February ===
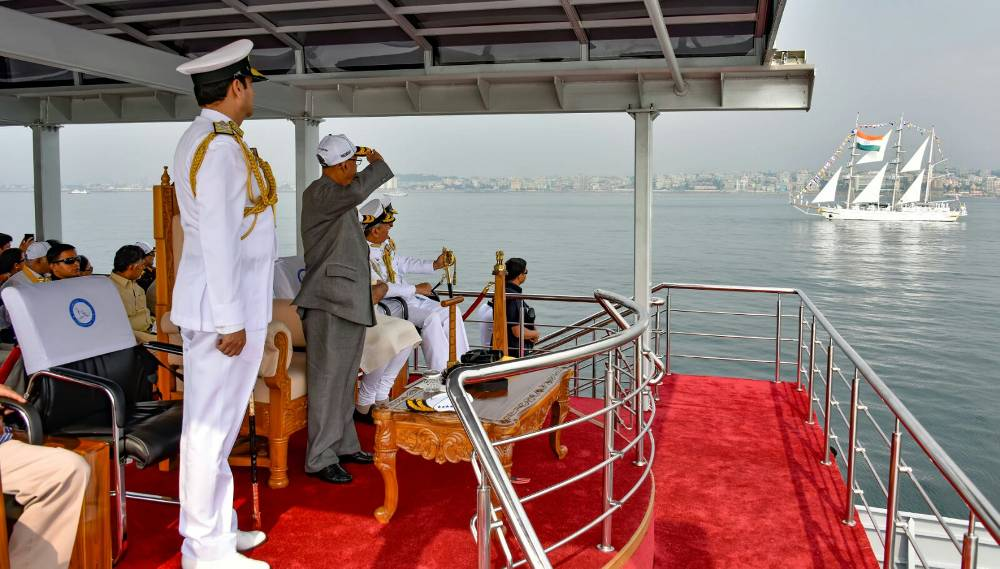
Indian President Pranab Mukherjee reviewing the international fleet

The Indian Navy fleet and foreign naval ships were reviewed by the supreme commander of the Indian armed forces, President of India Pranab Mukherjee. Ships from the Indian Coast Guard and the mercantile marine and the Indian Naval Air Arm were also reviewed.

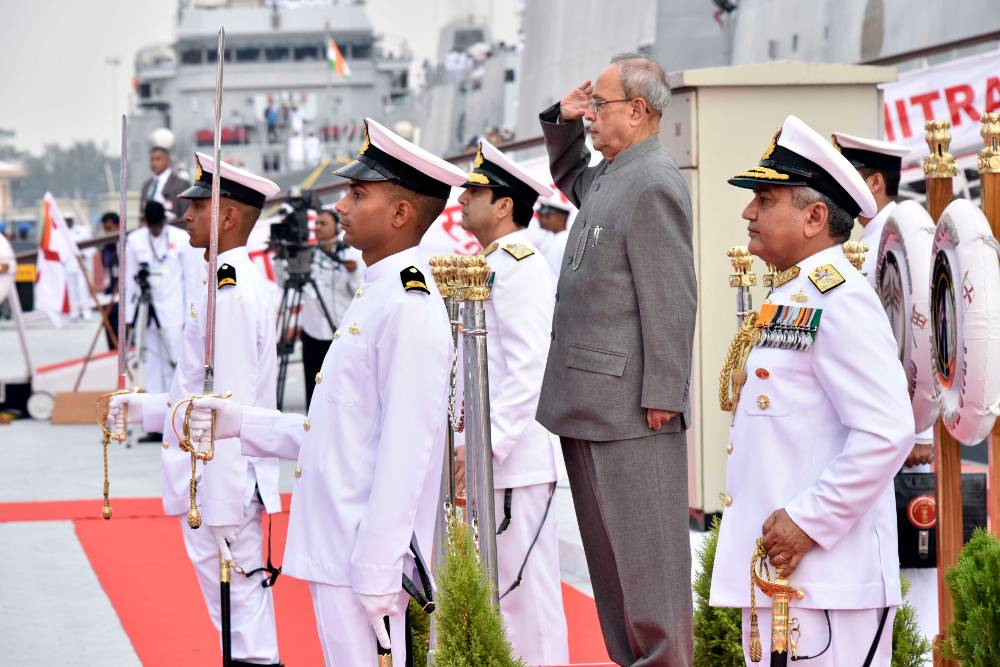
President Mukherjee with the ceremonial guard of honour

The naval band presented a concert at the Samudrika Naval Auditorium. The Indian Navy hosted a presidential banquet in the Eastern Naval Command officers' mess attended by central- and state-government dignitaries, chiefs of foreign navies, heads of delegations, and Indian and foreign participants in the IFR.

=== 7 February ===
A two-day international maritime conference began on 7 February with the theme, "Partnering together for a secure maritime future". The Navy conducted a parade and a 30-minute operation demonstration at RK Beach in Vishakhapatnam. Contingents of the Indian Armed Forces, the Andhra Pradesh Police, the National Cadet Corps and foreign navies and their bands marched in the parade. Prime Minister Narendra Modi introduced a book about India's maritime heritage during the event. The parade ended with a reception hosted by Chief of Naval Staff Dhowan honouring the prime minister.

=== 8 February ===
An international band concert was presented at the naval institute as part of the IFR 2016 closing ceremony.

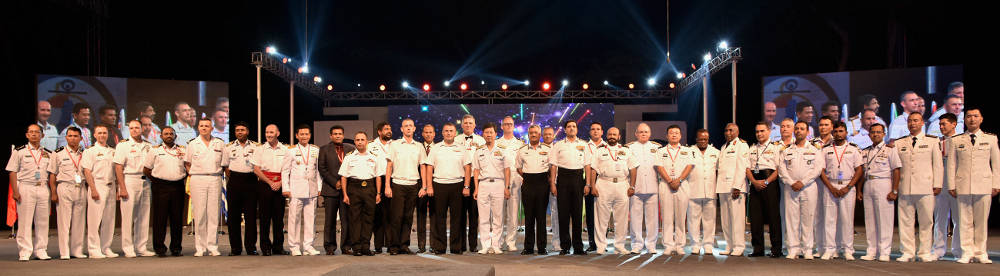
Group photo of delegates at the IFR 2016 closing ceremony

== Participating ships ==
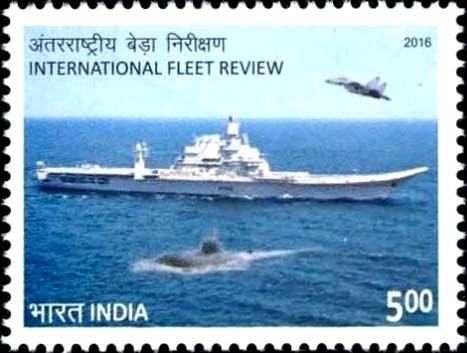
Commemorative postage stamp released by India Post on IFR 2016

Seventy-one ships from the Indian Navy participated in the review, including aircraft carriers, submarines, frigates, destroyers, corvettes, sailing vessels, and amphibious warfare vessels. Most were from the navy's Eastern Naval Command. Twenty-four foreign ships and 50 foreign navies also participated. Delegations from Argentina, Bahrain, Brunei, Canada, Chile, Djibouti, Egypt, Fiji, Germany, Greece, Israel, Kenya, South Korea, Namibia, New Zealand, the Philippines, Portugal, Qatar, Saudi Arabia, Singapore, Spain, Sri Lanka, Sudan, Sweden, Tanzania, Tunisia, Turkey and Turkmenistan were in attendance.

== Green initiative ==
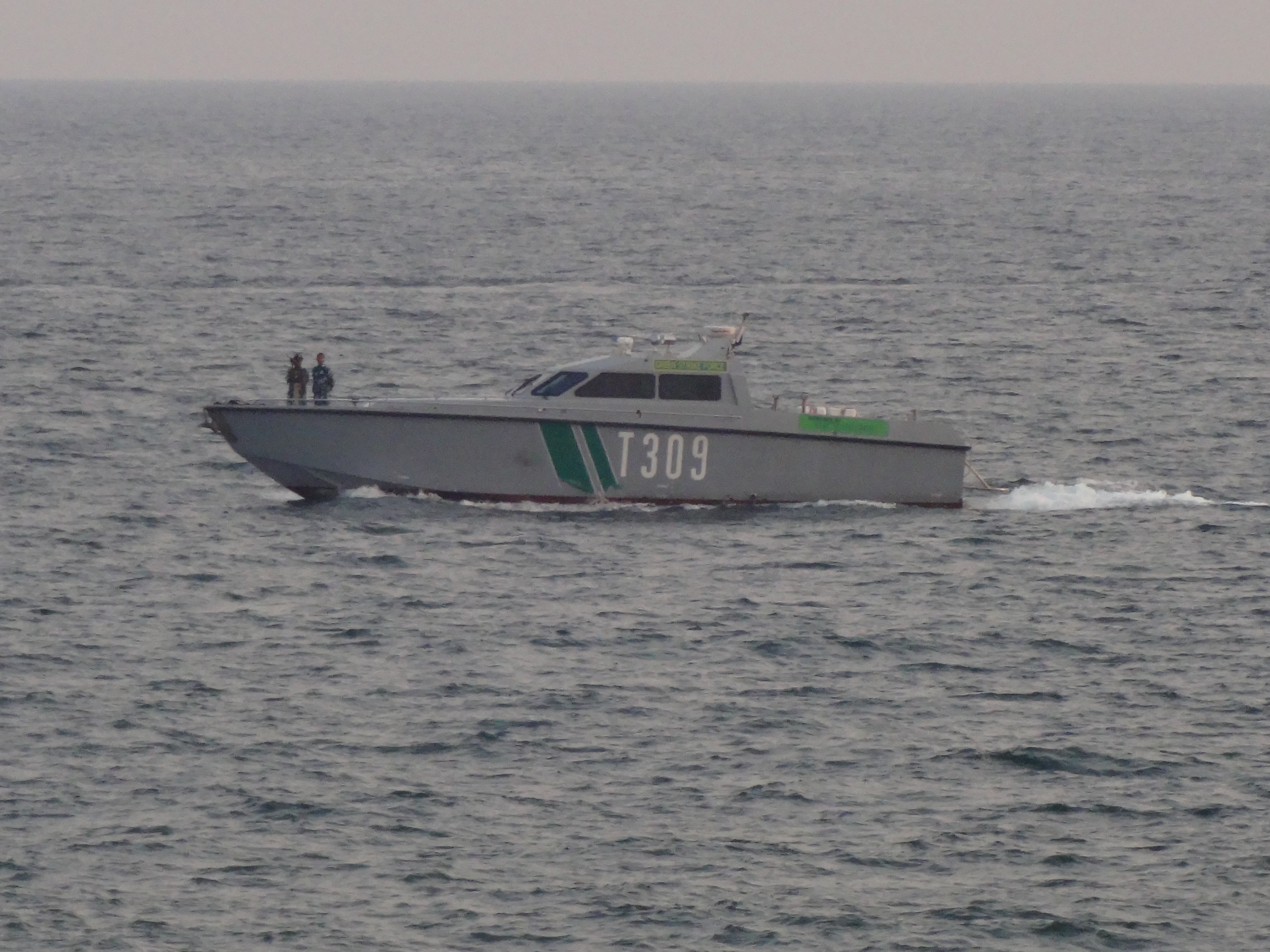
Biodiesel-powered Indian Navy fast attack craft on patrol during IFR 2016

As part of its green initiative, the Indian Navy showcased two fast interceptor craft (FIC) which use biodiesel and have replaced the incandescent lamps on its ships with LED light bulbs.

== Passage exercise (PASSEX) ==
The International Fleet Review ended with the participating ships undertaking a passage exercise (PASSEX) in the Bay of Bengal on 9 February. The exercise was conducted in two formations, with the aircraft carriers INS Vikramaditya and INS Viraat each heading a formation. The first group was headed by the Vikramaditya, commanded by Western Fleet Rear Admiral Ravneet Singh; the second was headed by the Viraat, commanded by Eastern Fleet Rear Admiral S. V. Bhokare. A helicopter from HMS Defender landed on the Viraat, commemorating the carrier's historic ties with the Royal Navy.

== Gallery ==
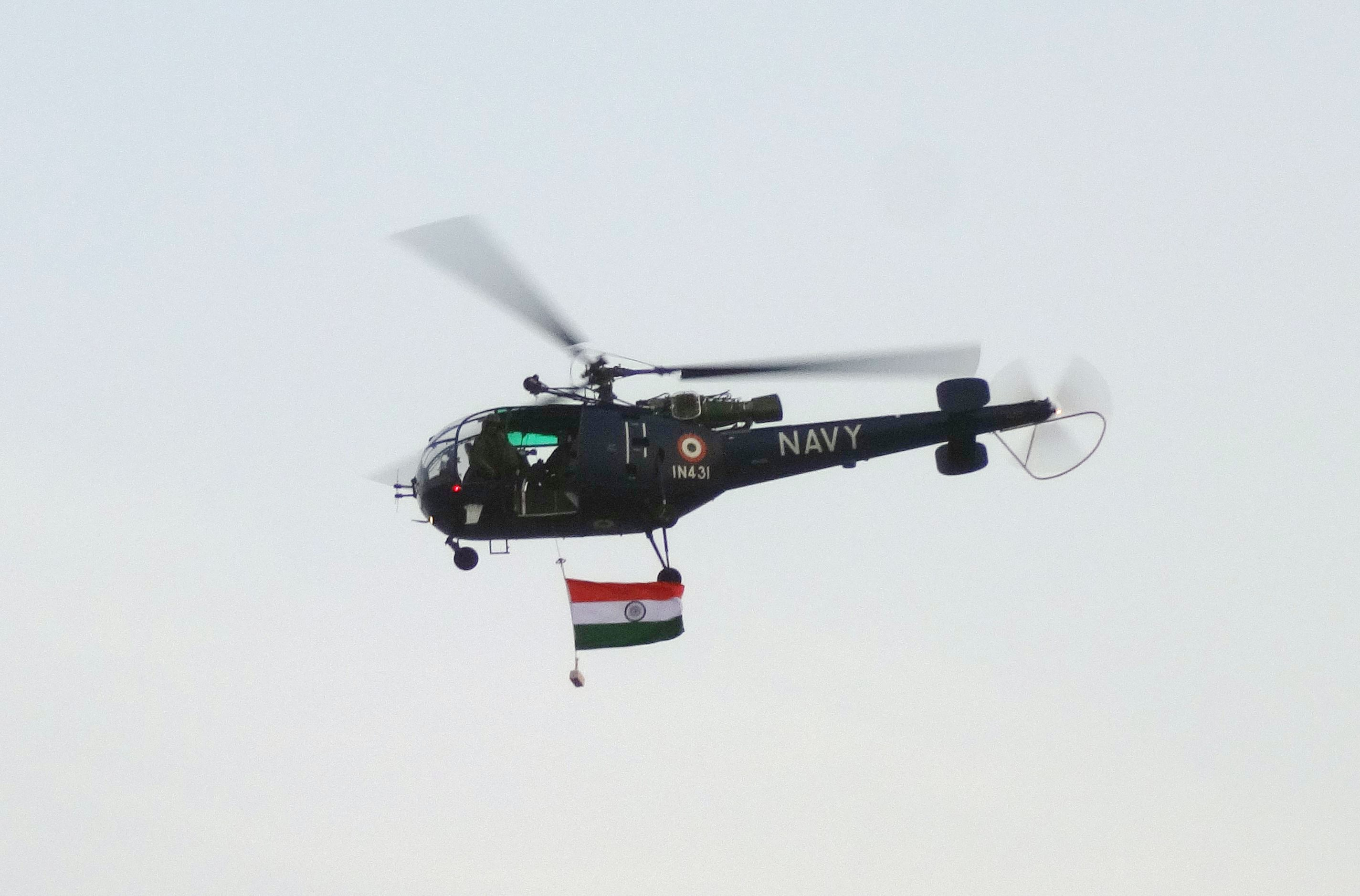
Indian Navy Chetak during IFR 2016

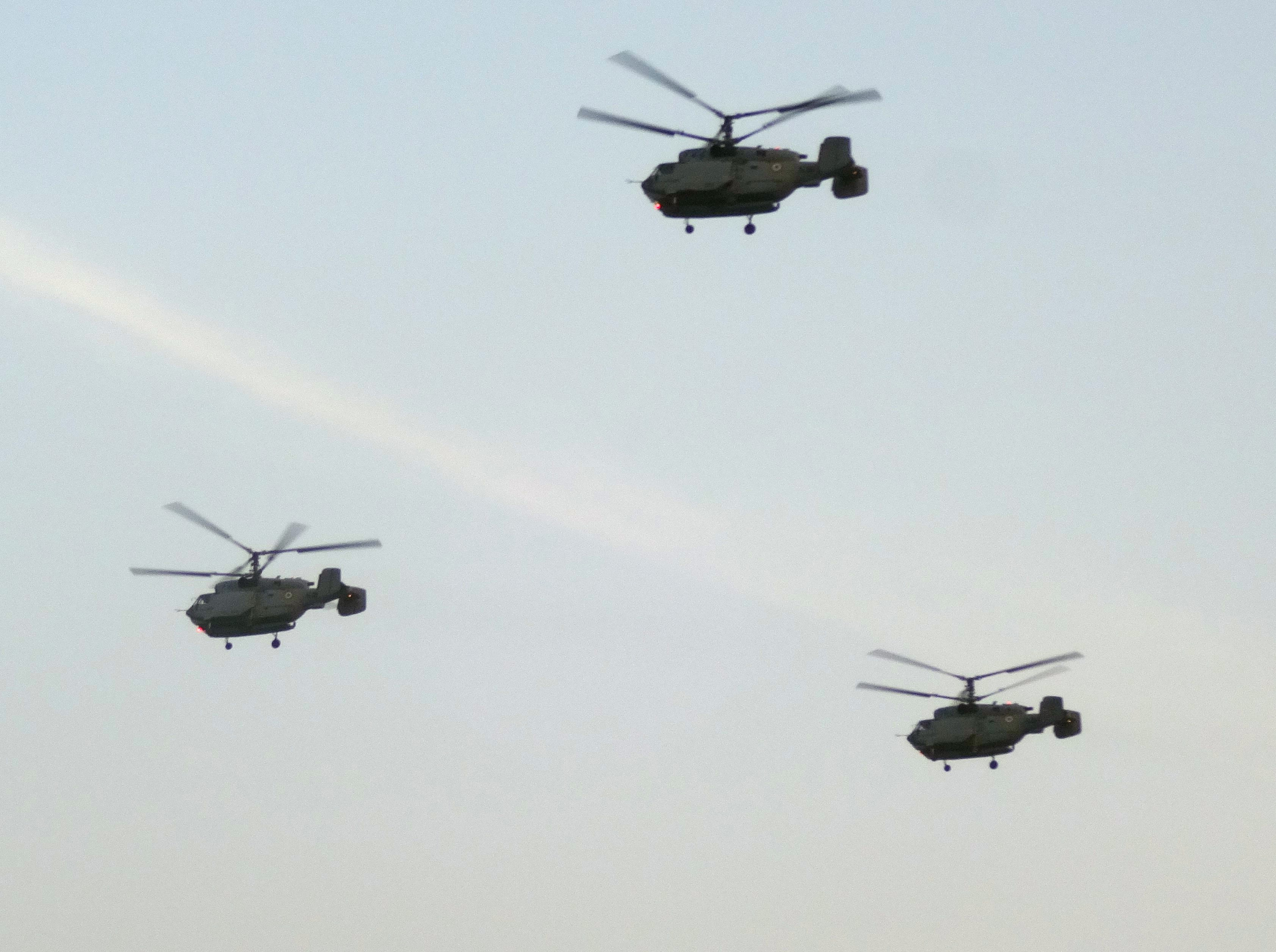
Flypast by Indian Navy Kamov Ka-31s

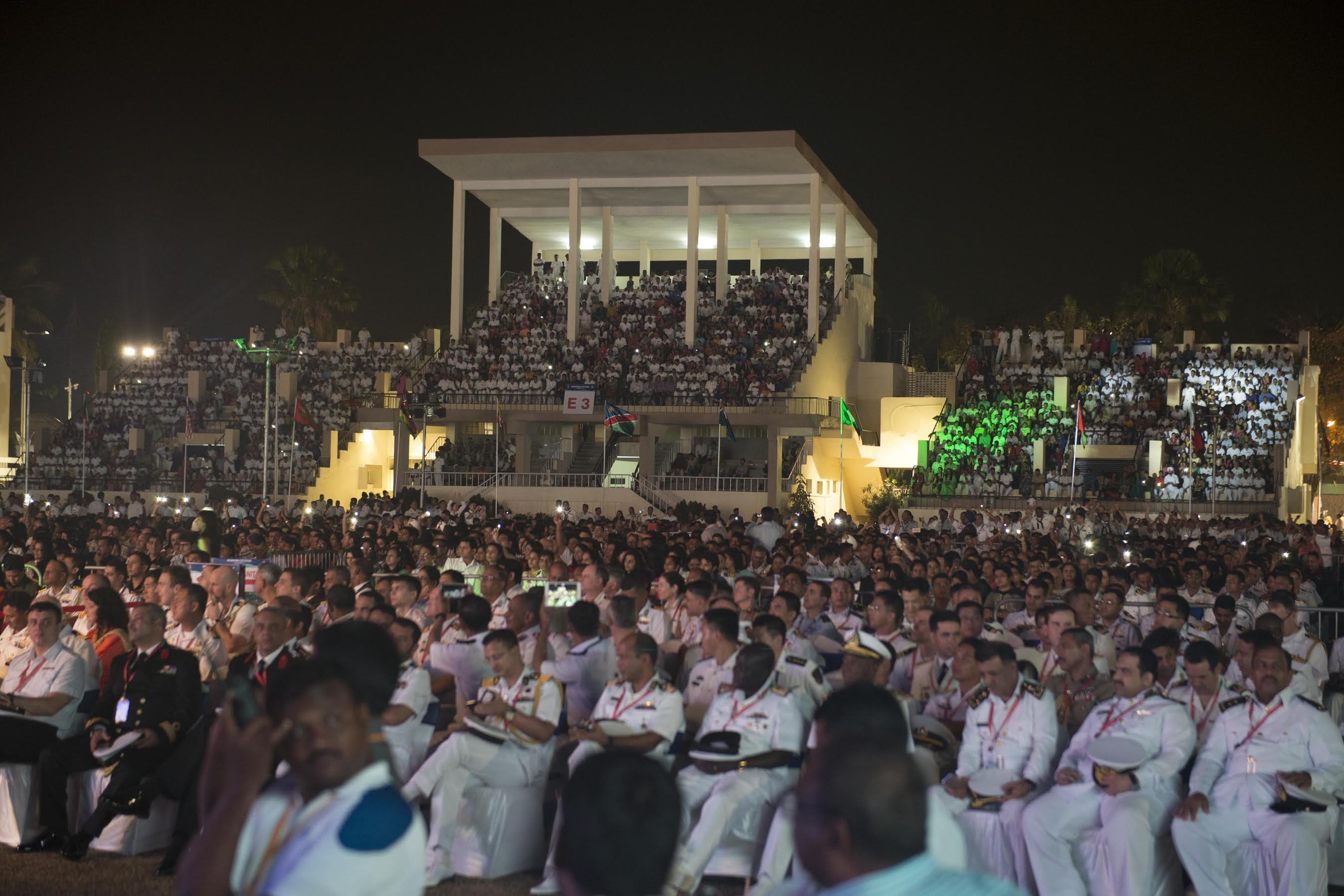
Delegates from over 50 countries

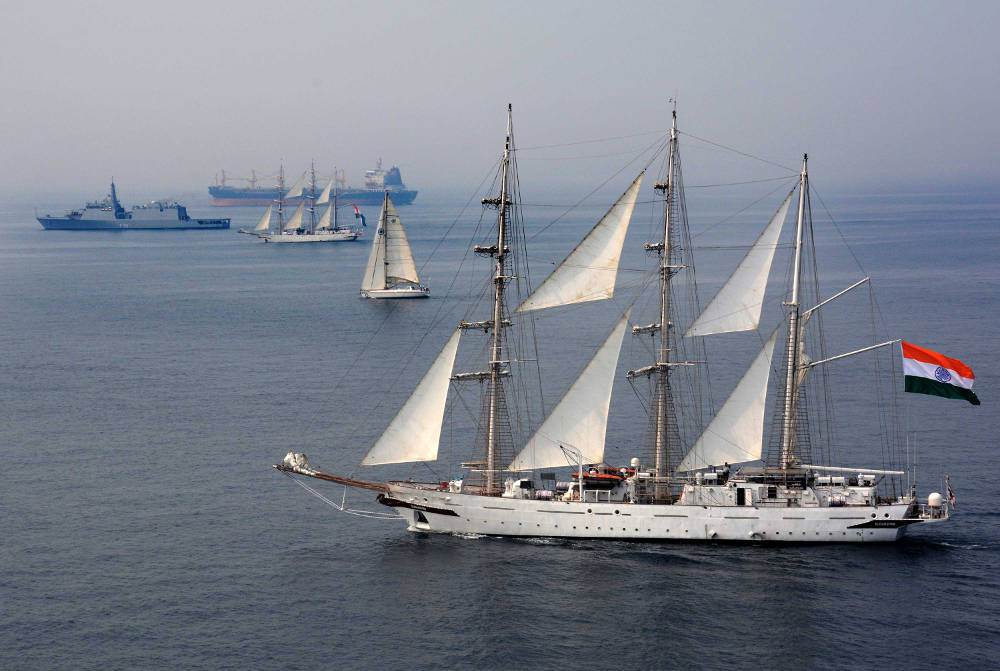
Tall ships sail in company during IFR 2016

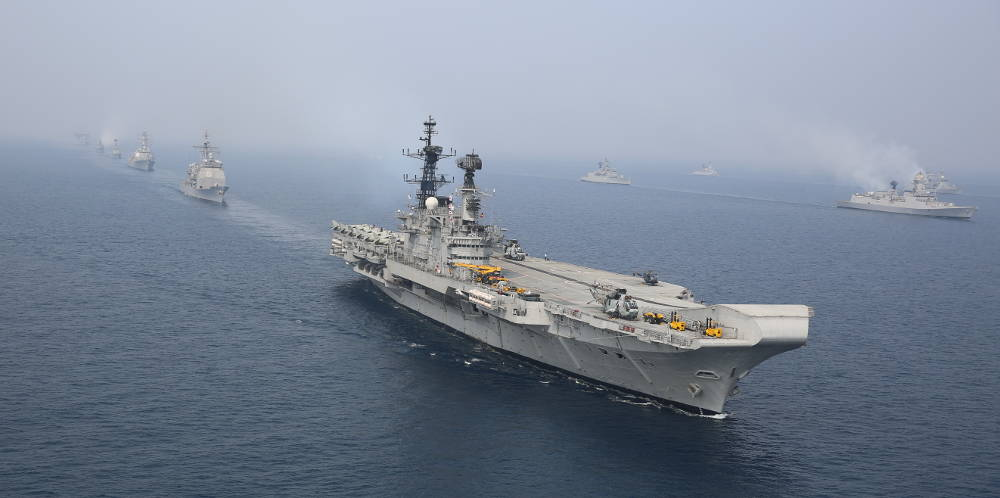
Passage exercise (PASSEX) in the Bay of Bengal, 9 February 2016

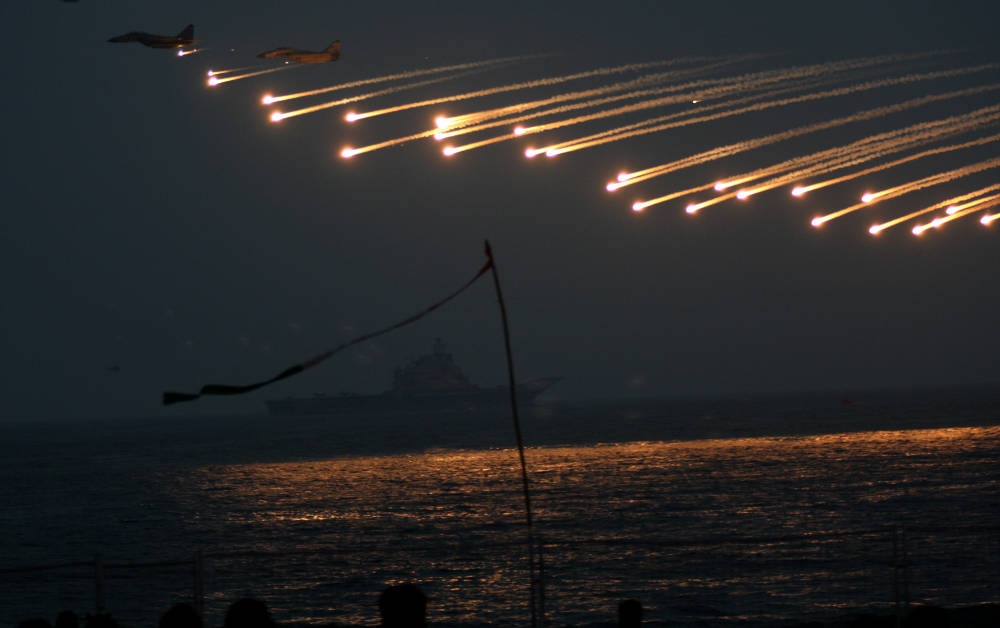
MIG 29k in Action

== See also ==
- International Fleet Review 2005
- International Fleet Review 2013
- International Fleet Review 2026
- President's fleet review
- Fleet review (Commonwealth realms)
- List of ships present at International Fleet Review, 2005
- List of ships present at International Fleet Review 2013
