= President's fleet review =

Military parade in India

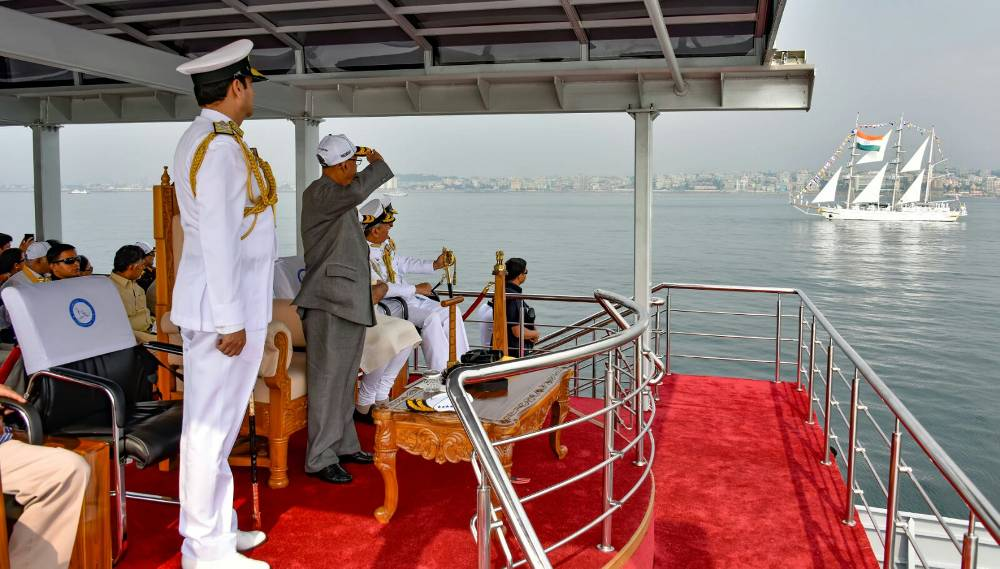
President of India receiving the salute during the International Fleet Review 2016.

The Review of the Fleet by the President of India is an event where ships, submarines and aircraft from the Indian Navy are paraded to be reviewed by the President of India. The President of India as the Supreme Commander of the Indian Armed Forces reviews the Indian fleet as Head of the Republic.

Since India became a Republic in 1950, 13 fleet reviews have taken place. The President's fleet review could also include warships and delegates from other national navies. Of the 13, three were International fleet reviews (IFR) - in 2001, 2016 and 2026.

== History ==
The earliest fleet review in India was recorded in the 18th century. The Maratha fleet, under Sarkhel Kanhoji Angre, consisting of Ghurabs and Gallivats were reviewed at the coastal fortress of Ratnagiri. Fleet Reviews have been conducted in the United Kingdom since the 14th century. During the British Raj, Royal Indian Navy ships participated in the fleet reviews in the UK. HMIS Indus (U67) attended the Coronation review of the fleet in 1937 in Spithead.

== Background ==
The President of India reviews the fleet once in his/her tenure. In ceremonial significance, President's review of the fleet is second only to the Republic Day Parade. The Indian Navy showcases its military hardware and capabilities to the President and the country at the fleet review. Apart from the Indian Naval ships, ships and aircraft from the Indian Coast Guard, the Ministry of Earth Sciences, the Shipping Corporation of India, the Merchant Navy, the National Institute of Oceanography, the Oil and Natural Gas Corporation, and Naval Yard Craft have also taken part in different reviews.

The President embarks in the Presidential Yacht which flies the Presidential standard. After receiving a Ceremonial Guard of Honour and a 21-gun salute, the President reviews the Fleet by sailing past each line of ships. Each ship, dressed in ceremonial regalia, is crewed by her ship's company which salutes the President as the Presidential Yacht passes by. The ship's company, in unison, take off their caps in salutation and give three resounding "Jais!" with the President returning the salute. The review also includes the flypast of aircraft of the Indian Naval Air Arm. Helicopters and fixed-wing aircraft from the naval air squadrons and coast guard squadrons participate in the review.

The latest acquisitions of the Navy are also showcased. Several waterfront activities, including Search and Rescue Demonstration at Sea, Parade of Sails, Aerobatics by Hawk aircraft and Water Para Jumps by the elite MARCOS are conducted. At sunset, the beating retreat with the ceremonial lowering of the flags. This is followed by the lighting up of the fleet and all ships at the anchorage participate in a fireworks display.

The International fleet reviews are conducted over multiple days. Due to the presence of ships and naval officers and sailors from across many navies, several events are planned before and after the fleet review. IFR 2001 was held between 16 and 18 February 2001 while IFR 2016 was held between 4 and 9 February 2016. Both the IFRs had maritime conferences, seminars, banquets, parades, and exercises.

== Fleet reviews ==
=== Rajendra Prasad ===
On 10 October 1953, Dr. Rajendra Prasad reviewed the fleet at Bombay. 33 vessels including 25 warships, 7 yard craft and 1 merchant ship participated in the review. Apart from these ships, six Short Sealand aircraft took part in a fly-past. One Sealand aircraft, piloted by Lieutenant Commander Y. N. Singh with Lieutenant Mihir K. Roy as crew, carried out a landing on water.

=== Sarvepalli Radhakrishnan ===
Dr. S. Radhakrishnan reviewed the fleet on 10 February 1966 off Bombay. This was the first occasion where an aircraft carrier participated in a fleet review. INS Vikrant which was acquired in 1961 was displayed in this review. 10 ships were part of the review.

=== V. V. Giri ===
On 28 December 1969, V. V. Giri reviewed a fleet of 58 ships which included 45 Naval ships, 5 coast guard ships and 8 merchant ships. 33 aircraft from the Indian Naval Air Arm also participated in the review. This was the first occasion where a submarine was displayed. The Kalvari-class submarine INS Khanderi, India's second submarine participated in the review.

=== Fakhruddin Ali Ahmed ===
President Fakhruddin Ali Ahmed reviewed the fleet at Bombay on 11 January 1976. 43 warships and 5 submarines, apart from 5 aircraft and 6 merchant ships took part in the review. The first Indian designed and built ships - the Nilgiri-class frigates participated in the review.

=== Zail Singh ===
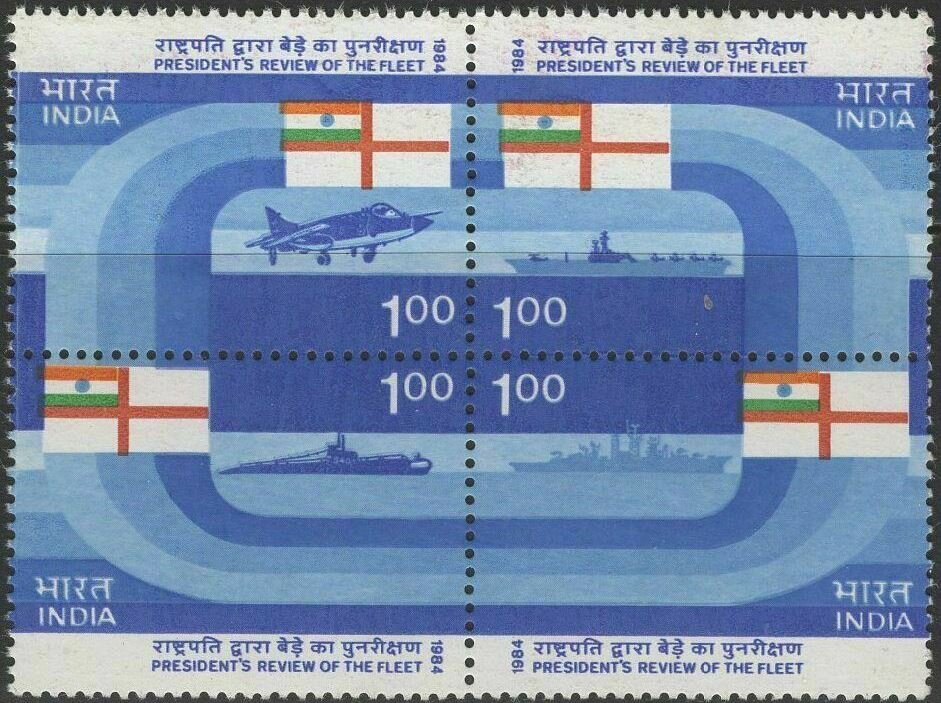
Stamps released on the occasion of President's fleet review in 1984.

The 5th President's fleet review happened on 12 February 1984 at Bombay. 65 ships were present which included 45 naval ships, 2 coast guard ships, 7 yard craft and 9 merchant ships, apart from 3 submarines. The British Aerospace Sea Harriers which arrived in India in 1983 were displayed for the first time in a fleet review. A total of 32 aircraft from the Indian Naval Air arm and 5 from the coast guard air arm participated.

=== Ramaswamy Venkataraman ===
President R. Venkataraman reviewed the fleet on 15 February 1989. The review held at Bombay had 86 warships from the Navy and the Coast Guard. This included both aircraft carriers in the Indian Navy at the time - INS Vikrant and INS Viraat (R22). For the first time, a Nuclear submarine - INS Chakra was part of the review. 39 aircraft which included the Sea Harrier, Ilyushin Il-38, Tupolev Tu-142, Dornier 228, HAL HJT-16 Kiran, Fokker F27 Friendship, Britten-Norman BN-2 Islander, Kamov Ka-31 and HAL Chetak flew past.

=== Shankar Dayal Sharma ===
On 9 March 1997, Shankar Dayal Sharma review the fleet at Bombay. The President's colour was presented to the Western Fleet by the President onboard the flagship INS Viraat (R22). 25 ships, 4 submarines and 5 other vessels participated in the review.

=== K. R. Narayanan ===
In 1999, it was decided that the next President's fleet review would be an International fleet review commemorating the golden jubilee of the republic and would be held in February 2001, with 20–25 countries participating. As India's first IFR, events were planned from 16 to 19 February 2001. These included an International Maritime Seminar on Maritime Power on 16th, the International Fleet Review and Beating retreat on 17th and the International City Parade on 18th. The overall responsibility of the IFR was of Vice Admiral Madhvendra Singh, the Flag Officer Commanding-in-Chief Western Naval Command, with Rear Admiral Ravi Kochhar, the Flag Officer Commanding Maharashtra Naval Area (FOMA) heading the IFR cell.

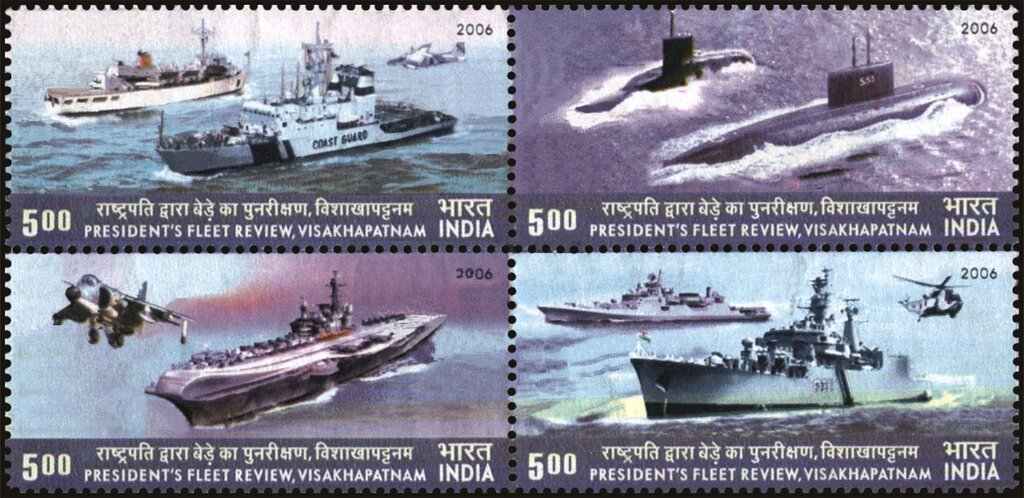
Stamps released on the occasion of the President's fleet review in 2006.

Navies from 29 countries participated in the IFR. 97 ships from 20 countries were displayed, of which 24 warships were from foreign countries. Of the 73 ships from India, 61 were from the Navy and 12 from the coast guard. 54 aircraft from the Naval air arm, Indian Air Force and coast guard air arm participated in the fleet review and 87 aircraft flew past during the International city parade. Naval bands from Bangladesh, France, Russia, Sri Lanka and the USA took part along with the Indian Navy Band. 16 Chiefs of Navies attended the IFR.

=== A. P. J. Abdul Kalam ===
The PFR in 2006 was the first fleet review to be held outside Bombay and was held in Visakhapatnam. Dr. A. P. J. Abdul Kalam reviewed the fleet on 12 February 2006. As the first fleet review on the East coast of India, the scale of the event was larger with 13 events planned. On 11th, a band concert and illumination of ships took place culminating with the Command reception and Presidential banquet. The review and the operational demo happened on the 12th. On 13th, the President's colour was presented to the Eastern Fleet.

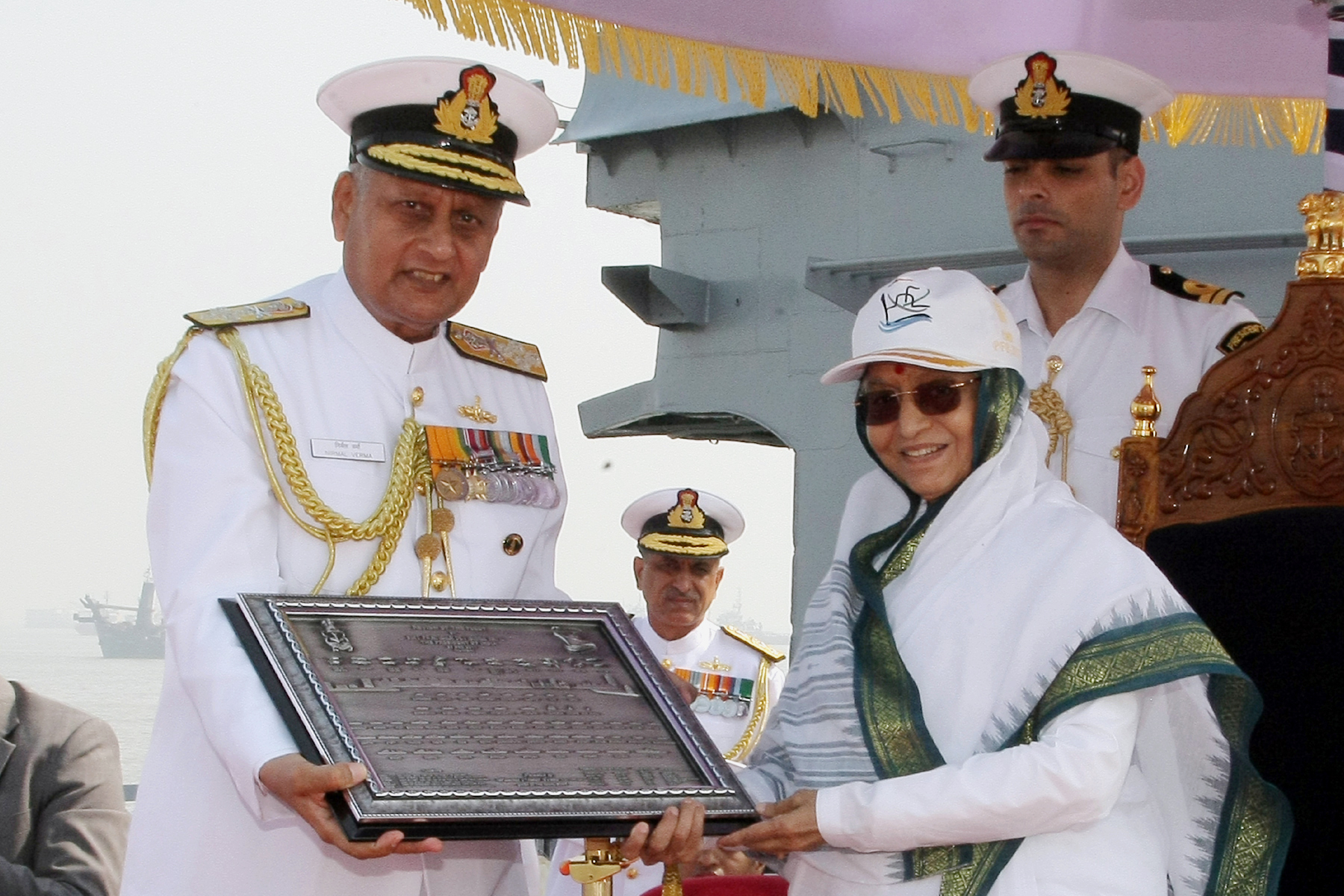
CNS Admiral Nirmal Verma with President Pratibha Patil.

In a first, a dived submarine sortie took place with the President embarked. INS Sindhurakshak (S63) dived to a depth of 30m and demonstrated the attack procedure to the President. 66 ships and 50 aircraft from the Navy and Coast Guard participated in the review.

=== Pratibha Patil ===
The PFR in 2011 was reviewed by Pratibha Patil in Mumbai on 20 December 2011. A total of 66 warships of the Navy and 10 ICG ships participated, along with 47 aircraft.

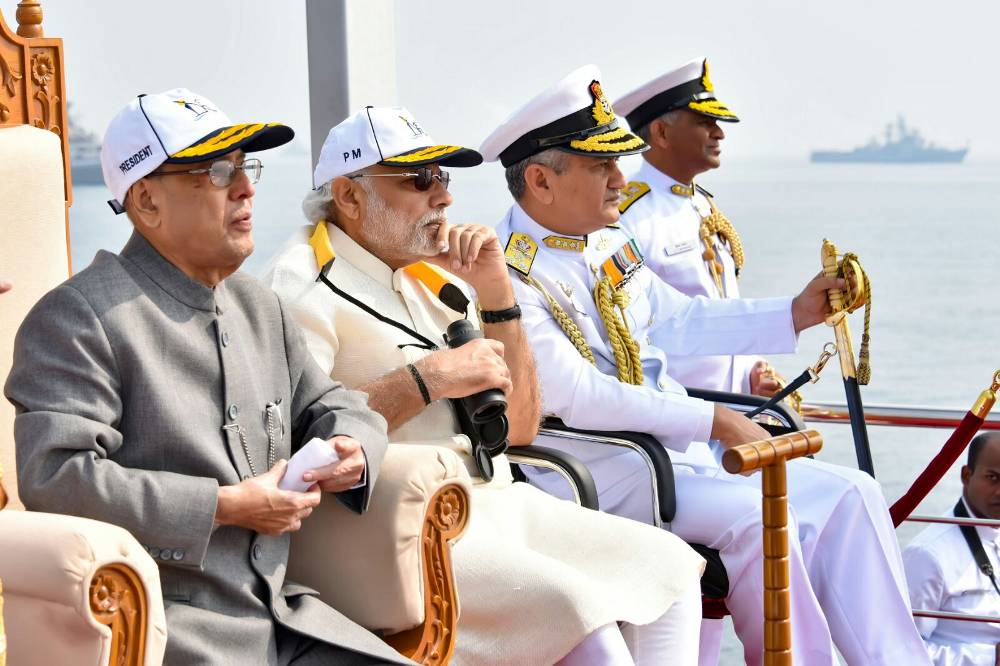
President Mukherjee with Prime Minister Modi during the International Fleet Review in 2016.

=== Ram Nath Kovind ===
President Ram Nath Kovind reviewed the fleet on 21 February 2022 at Visakhapatnam. This was conducted on the occasion of the 75th anniversary of India's Independence, celebrated as 'Azadi Ka Amrit Mahotsav'. A total of 60 ships and submarines, and 55 aircraft participated in the review.

== Other fleet reviews ==
On two occasions, the fleets were reviewed by people other than the President of India.

- In 1956, the fleet was reviewed by the Shah of Iran during his state visit in March. 12 ships took part in the review.
- In 1964, the Minister of Defence Y. B. Chavan reviewed the fleet on behalf of the President Dr. S. Radhakrishnan who was indisposed. A total of 52 vessels took part in the review, including 31 warships, 9 merchant ships and 12 yard craft.

== Bibliography ==
- Doraibabu, M; Godbole, Amrut (2023), A Decade of Transformation: The Indian Navy 2011-2021, Harper Collins Publishers India, ISBN 9789394407909
- Hiranandani, Gulab Mohanlal (2009), Transition to Guardianship: The Indian Navy 1991–2000, Lancer Publishers LLC, ISBN 978-1-935501-66-4
- Singh, Anup (2018), Blue Waters Ahoy!: The Indian Navy 2001-2010, Harper Collins Publishers India, ISBN 9789353025526
- Singh, Satyindra (1992), Blueprint to Bluewater: The Indian Navy 1951-1965, Lancet International, ISBN 81-7062-148-8
- Hiranandani, G. M. (1999), Transition to Triumph: History of the Indian Navy, 1965-1975, Spantech & Lancer, ISBN 978-1897829721
