= SLNS Sayurala =

Two ships operated by the Sri Lanka Navy have had the name SLNS Sayurala.

- SLNS Sayurala (P623), an ex-Indian Coast Guard Vikram-class offshore patrol vessel which enter service in Sri Lanka Navy in 2009 and returned to India in 2011
- SLNS Sayurala (2016), an Indian-built Saryu-class patrol vessel which was commissioned in 2017
