= Indian Ocean Naval Symposium =

Indian Ocean region maritime meetings

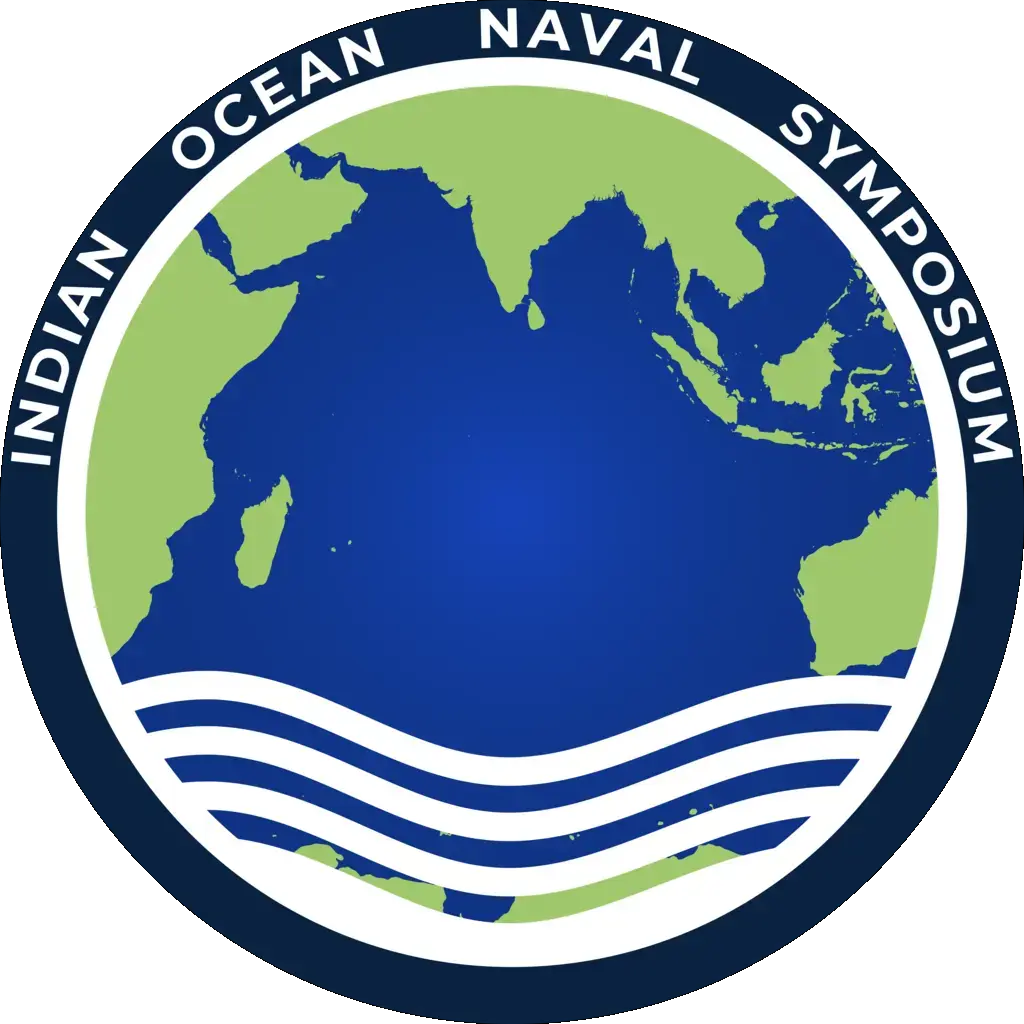
IONS Logo

The Indian Ocean Naval Symposium (IONS) is a series of biennial meetings between the littoral states of the Indian Ocean region. It provides a forum to increase maritime security cooperation, discuss regional maritime issues, and promote friendly relationships among the member states.

== History ==
The symposium was first held in 2008 with India as host. The chairmanship and location of the Symposium rotates between the various member states. Each term of chairmanship is two years.

== Role ==
IONS is a security construct for the Indian Ocean region which is similar to the Western Pacific Naval Symposium. It is a voluntary initiative among the navies and maritime security agencies of the member nations. In addition to the symposiums, numerous other activities like workshops, essay competitions and lectures are also held under the umbrella of the organization.

== Members and observers ==
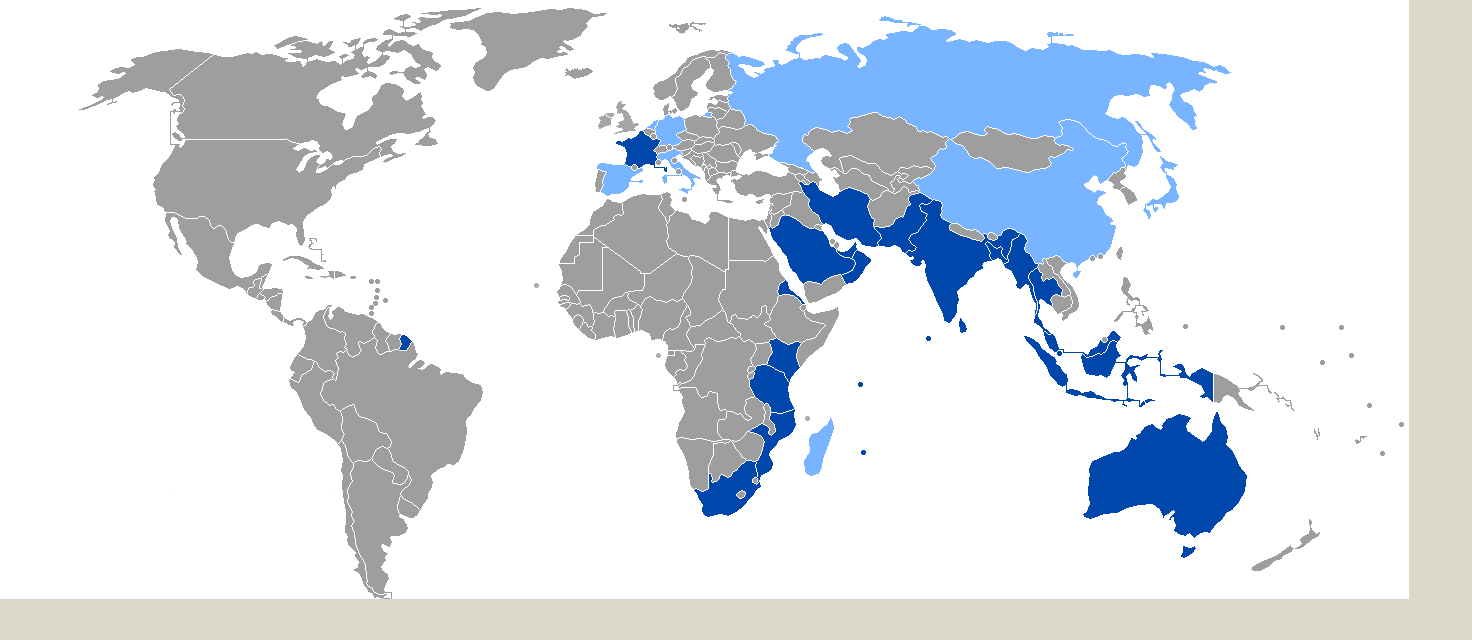
Indian Ocean Naval Symposium Dark blue = member States Light blue = observers

The 25 member nations of the IONS are grouped into four sub-regions.

=== Members ===
Sub region	Member	Accession
South Asian	Bangladesh	
South Asian	India	February 2008
South Asian	Maldives	
South Asian	Pakistan	March 2014
South Asian	Seychelles	
South Asian	Sri Lanka	
West Asian	Iran	
West Asian	Oman	
West Asian	Saudi Arabia	
West Asian	Qatar	
West Asian	UAE	
East African	France (Note: Represented by Indian Ocean overseas region of Mayotte and Réunion.)	
East African	Kenya	
East African	Mauritius	
East African	Mozambique	
East African	South Africa	
East African	Tanzania	
East African	Eritrea	
South East Asian and Australian	Australia	
South East Asian and Australian	Indonesia	
South East Asian and Australian	Malaysia	
South East Asian and Australian	Myanmar	
South East Asian and Australian	Singapore	
South East Asian and Australian	Thailand	
South East Asian and Australian	Timor Leste	

=== Observers ===
There are nine states with observer status

- China
- Germany
- Italy
- Japan
- South Korea
- Madagascar
- Netherlands
- Russia
- Spain

== List of symposiums ==
Year	Edition	Host	Dates	Notes
2008	1st	India	14–16 February 2008	
2010	2nd	United Arab Emirates	10–12 May 2010	
2012	3rd	South Africa	10–14 April 2012	
2014	4th	Australia	26 March 2014	
2016	5th	Bangladesh	11–13 January 2016	
2018	6th	Iran	22–25 April 2018	
2021	7th	(France) Réunion and Paris	June 2021	
2023	8th	Thailand	19–22 December 2023	
2025	9th	India	20 February 2026	

The 7th edition of Indian Ocean Naval Symposium was held at Réunion, France. But during that, it was agreed upon to conduct the extant conclave of Chiefs in Paris. Eventually, in November 2021 the conclave was concluded in Paris, France.

The ninth edition of IONS Conclave of Chiefs hosted in Visakhapatnam, simultaneously with the International Fleet Review 2026 and exercise MILAN 2026, had Chiefs of Navies and Heads of Maritime Security Agencies from 33 countries. During the conclave, the Philippines joined as an observer while Oman joined the IONS Working Group on HADR.
