= Future of the Indian Navy =

Indian Navy's focus

Naval Ensign of India

The Indian Navy has been focusing on developing indigenous platforms, systems, sensors and weapons as part of the nation's modernisation and expansion of its maritime forces. According to the Chief of the Naval Staff's statement in December 2020, India has transformed from a buyer's navy to a builder's navy. The Indian Navy plans to commission a vessel every six weeks from 2026.

== Summary ==
=== Fleet modernisation and expansion ===
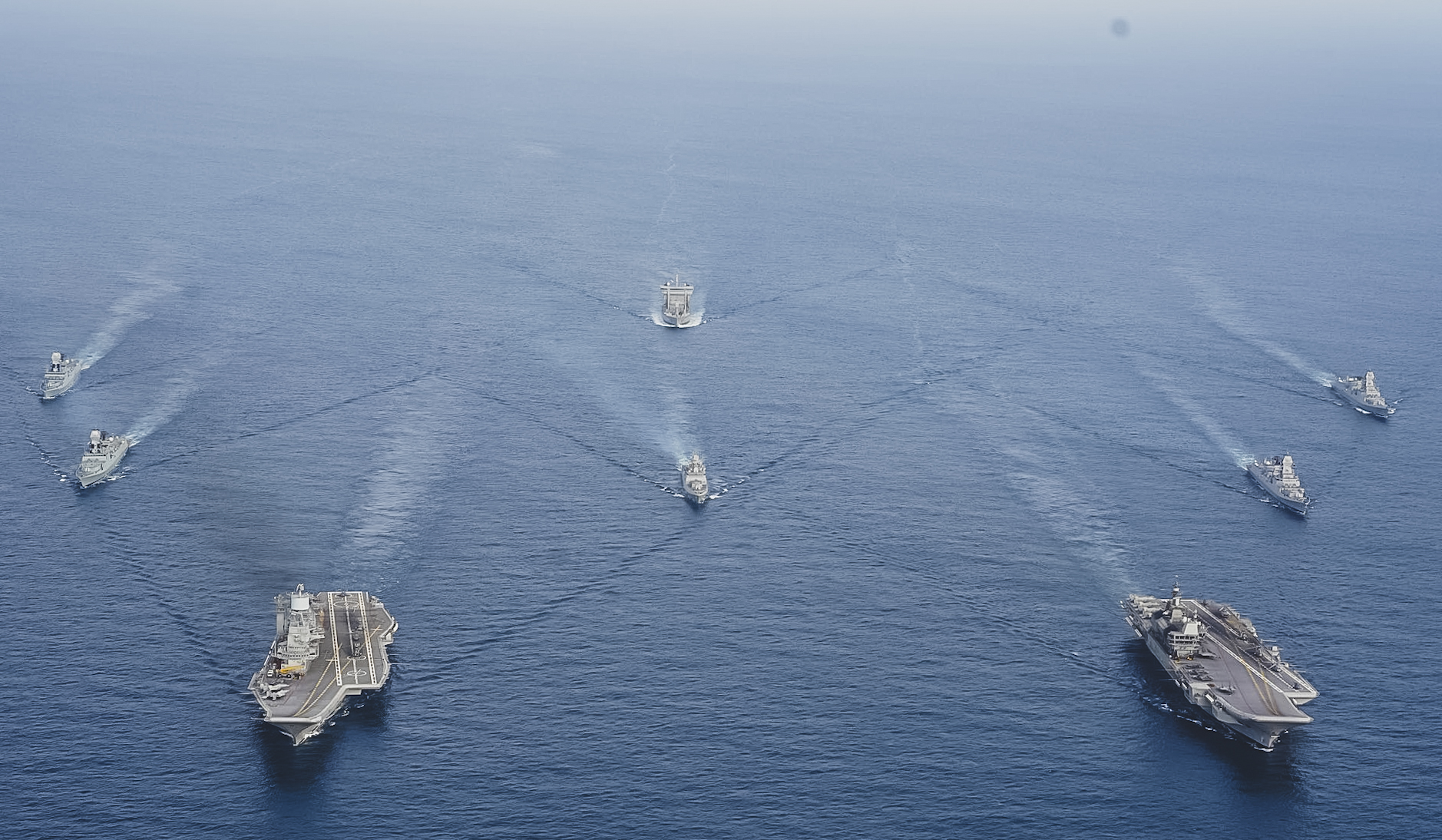
Indian Navy carrier battle group in formation, demonstrating twin carrier operations (March 2024)

The increasing interest of the Chinese People's Liberation Army Navy in the Indian Ocean region has led the Indian Navy to invest more in anti-submarine ships, such as the Kamorta-class corvette, long-range maritime reconnaissance aircraft such as the Boeing P-8I Neptune and ships such as the Saryu-class patrol vessel and unmanned aerial vehicles such as the IAI Heron Mk2. However the lack of a strong submarine fleet has diminished its capabilities to some extent. Post-Chinese intrusions into Ladakh in 2020, it has been announced that the Indian Navy plans to upgrade the military facilities in the Andaman and Nicobar Islands on the eastern seaboard as well as Lakshadweep on the western seaboard, with the aim of having a network of island airbases in both the Arabian Sea and the Bay of Bengal which provides an infrastructure which will guarantee freedom of navigation and overflight to all Indian territories. The Indian Ocean Region (IOR) accounts for 1,00,000 annual ship transits including 30% of global containerised transport as well as shipment 42% of crude oil and its products and distillates.

| Timeline | Warship fleet | Aircraft fleet | Under construction | On order | Acceptance of Necessity (Note: The Acceptance of Necessity (AoN) is accorded by the Defence Ministry's Defence Acquisition Council (DAC), which is chaired by the Defence Minister.) | Note |
|---|---|---|---|---|---|---|
| December 2024 | >130 | 251 | 64 | 24 | 31 (7 frigates, 8 corvettes and 6 submarines) | |
| September 2025 | 140 | —N/a | 54 (in 6 shipyards), worth ₹99,500 crore (equivalent to ₹1.0 trillion or US$11 billion in 2026) | —N/a | 74 (65 surface ships and 9 submarines), worth ₹2.35 lakh crore (equivalent to ₹2.4 trillion or US$25 billion in 2026) | 10 to be commissioned in 2025, 19 in 2026, 13 in 2027 and all by 2030. |
| May 2026 | >140 | —N/a | 45 | —N/a | 75 (69 surface ships, 6 submarines excluding 120 fast interceptor crafts) | |
| October 2026 | >140 | —N/a | 45 | 42 | 78 (excluding 120 fast interceptor crafts; worth ₹2.41 trillion (US$25 billion)) | |

In April 2025, the Indian Navy also signed a contract to procure 26 Dassault Rafale M fighter aircraft for its aircraft carriers to enhance its Naval Air Arm, with deliveries scheduled to be completed by 2030. As of May 2026, the Indian Navy has 45 warships under construction which will be delivered within three to four years. Further, the maritime force had received in-principle approval for projects to acquire 195 warships — including 69 surface ships, six submarines and 120 fast interceptor crafts. The Navy plans to have a fleet of 150–160 warships by 2030, which will further expand to over 200 naval vessels by 2035. The Navy's force level could reach up to 230 surface combatants and submarines by 2037 against the current 140 ships including 16 diesel-electric submarines and three nuclear ballistic missile submarines.

On 5 September 2025, the Ministry of Defence published the Technology Perspective and Capability Roadmap 2025. The document unveiled plans for the Indian Navy to operate at least 10 nuclear-propelled surface ships including an aircraft carrier, INS Vishal.

=== Indigenisation ===
As for indigenisation, the Indian Navy is following the "Roll-on Plan for 2023-26" while the progress is being monitored by Centre for Indigenisation & Self Reliance (CISR) at Coimbatore. The CISR has two Indigenisation Units (IUs) with one at Visakhapatnam, whose area of responsibility includes the Eastern Naval Command & Andaman and Nicobar Command and the other at Mumbai to supervise Western Naval Command. Three aspects are recognised for evaluating the indigenous content of a ship which includes Float (Hull and its related fittings and components), Move (Engines, Complete propulsions systems, etc.) and Fight (Sensor suites and Weapon systems) categories. As of October 2024, 90%, 60% and 50% of the respective categories have been indigenised. The Navy also plans to increase the indigenous content on already-commissioned frontline warships like INS Vikramaditya, Kalvari-class submarine, Talwar-class frigate and Deepak-class fleet tanker. The Indian Navy is also planning to acquire the HAL TEDBF, an indigenous fighter aircraft currently under development, for its aircraft carriers in the 2030s.

Between 2019 and 2024, the Indian Navy spent two-thirds of its modernisation budget on indigenous procurement.

On 1 July 2025, the Indian Navy commissioned its final warship of built at a foreign shipyard, INS Tamal, in Russia. All the following warships are being constructed indigenously by Indian shipyards. Additionally, the Navy also plans a fleet of 13 destroyers and 20 frigates equipped with over 300 BrahMos supersonic cruise missiles combined by 2030. While each of the new destroyers are equipped with 16 BrahMos launchers each, except for four of six Delhi class and Rajput-class destroyer which are equipped with eight BrahMos launchers each and INS Rana (D52) and INS Mysore (D60), each of the 20 frigates will be equipped with eight BrahMos launchers. Meanwhile, the latter two of the Talwar-class frigates belonging to the first batch are being upgraded with BrahMos systems.

== Index ==
This indicates that construction OR procurement has been initiated for at least 1 vessel of this class.
This indicates that a Request For Information (RFI) has been issued OR commercial negotiations are underway for at least 1 vessel of this class.
This indicates that the ship class is being considered for future induction, but has not yet been formally approved for procurement.

== Submarines ==
=== Nuclear Ballistic Missile Submarines (SSBN) ===
| Class | Picture | Type | No. of Boats | Origin | Displacement | Status | Note |
|---|---|---|---|---|---|---|---|
| Arihant class | | Ballistic missile submarine (SSBN) | 4 | India | Planned displacement of 7,000 tonnes for S4 & S4* vessels | 3 Active 1 Sea trials underway | Second flight of 2 submarines with eight VLS of SLBMs as against four VLS on the first two submarines. Due to development delays of S5-class, another submarine was proposed under this class but was never ordered. |
| S5 class | | Ballistic missile submarine (SSBN) | 4-6 | India | 13,500 tonnes | Under construction | In December 2025, it was reported that construction of the first two S5 SSBNs had commenced with four of the submarines expected to be commissioned by the late 2030s. |

=== Nuclear Attack Submarines (SSN) ===
| Class | Picture | Type | No. of Boats | Origin | Displacement | Status | Note |
|---|---|---|---|---|---|---|---|
| Chakra III (Akula-class) | INS Chakra | Nuclear-powered attack submarine (SSN) | 1 | Russia | 12,770–13,800 tons | Under construction | On 7 March 2019, India and Russia signed a $3 billion deal for the lease of another Akula-class submarine for 10 years. The submarine, dubbed Chakra III, was expected to be delivered in 2025, but was later delayed to 2028. |
| Project 77 | | Nuclear-powered attack submarine (SSN) | 6 | India | 10,000 tonnes | 2 Approved | The Government of India had approved the construction of six such submarines in February 2015. These submarines will be designed by the Indian Navy's Warship Design Bureau and indigenously built in the Shipbuilding Centre at Visakhapatnam. The Cabinet Committee on Security cleared the construction of two of these submarines in October 2024. |

=== Conventional Submarines (SSK) ===
| Class | Picture | Type | No. of Boats | Origin | Displacement | Status | Note |
|---|---|---|---|---|---|---|---|
| Kalvari class | INS Khanderi | Attack submarine | 3 | India France | 1,800 tonnes | Proposed | Contract for 3 more submarines of the Kalvari class submarines under consideration, however it is likely to be scrapped in favor of modified Type 214 submarines under P-75I. |
| Project 75I | | Attack submarine | 6 | India Germany | 3,000 – 4,000 tonnes | 6 Approved | Cost negotiations underway; to be designed by MDL-TKMS based on enlarged Type 214. The first submarine is expected 7 years after contract signing and 1 submarine every year after that. |
| Project 76 | | Attack submarine | 12 | India | 3,000 tonnes | Planned | Project cleared by defence ministry in June 2024. Feasibility study conducted by DRDO. Preliminary work under way may be completed by 2026-27 |

=== Others ===
| Class | Picture | Type | No. of Boats | Origin | Displacement | Status | Note |
|---|---|---|---|---|---|---|---|
| Swimmer Delivery Vehicle | | Midget submarine | 10 | India | 150 tonnes | Planned | Indian Navy will acquire at least 10 midget submarines for use as Swimmer Delivery Vehicles. These submarines will be used for conducting underwater special operations by MARCOS. The project is worth ₹2,000 crore (equivalent to ₹35 billion or US$360 million in 2026). |
| Extra Large Unmanned Underwater Vessel | | Unmanned underwater vehicle | 12 | India | >100 tonnes | Under construction | Ministry of Defence cleared ₹2,500 crore (equivalent to ₹27 billion or US$280 million in 2026) project for development and procurement of XLUUVs under Make-1 category in September 2024. Shall be capable of ISR, anti-submarine warfare, anti-surface warfare and mine warfare (mine laying and mine clearing). Construction of Jalkapi XLUUV by Krishna Defence and Allied Industries Ltd (KDAIL) in Halol, Gujarat began with the plate-cutting ceremony on 10 June 2025. |

== Ships ==
=== Aircraft carriers ===
| Name | Picture | No. of Ships | Origin | Displacement | Status | Note |
|---|---|---|---|---|---|---|
| Vikrant-class | | 1 | India | 45,000 tonnes | Proposed | Indian Navy had been pushing for a 65,000 tonne carrier, but the demand has been put on hold due to expenses and technologies needed on board. So now Navy is considering another 45,000-tonne class carrier, same as INS Vikrant, but with more indigenous systems and better propulsions. |
| INS Vishal | | 1 | India | 75,000 tonnes | Proposed | The ship will have a displacement of 75,000 tonnes and carry 54 fighters, 4 fixed-wing AEW&C aircraft, 8-10 helicopters & UAVs. It is also expected to be equipped with 2 electromagnetic catapult-based CATOBAR system. However, the propulsion system, whether nuclear-powered or powered by integrated electric propulsion system, is still being chalked out. |

=== Amphibious warfare ships ===
| Class | Picture | Type | No. of Ships | Origin | Displacement | Status | Note |
|---|---|---|---|---|---|---|---|
| Future Landing Platform Dock (LPD) | | Landing helicopter dock | 4 | India | 32,000 tonnes | Approved | Indian Navy released RFI for four through-deck LPDs to be made by Indian shipyards in 2021. Integrated Full Electric Propulsion (IFEP) is expected. Acceptance of Necessity (AoN) was granted by the MoD in October 2025.The RfP was issued to the shortlisted shipyards by mid October 2026 to the shortlisted shipyards. |
| High Speed Landing Craft | | Landing Craft | 6 | India | 285 tonnes | Planned | In September 2017, the Navy issued an RFI to acquire six landing craft capable of supporting assault missions and transporting equipment, vehicles & troops. |
| Mk. V LCU | | Landing craft utility | 6 | India | 1,500 tonnes | Planned | An RFI was issued to local shipyard in September 2026 for the design & development and acquisition a successor class to Mk. IV LCU. Capacity: 4 MBT, 4 BMP-2 and 190 troops; Speed: 15 kn (28 km/h); Range 4,500 nmi (8,300 km). |

=== Destroyers (DDG) ===
| Class | Picture | Type | No. of Ships | Origin | Displacement | Status | Note |
|---|---|---|---|---|---|---|---|
| Project 15C class | | Stealth guided missile destroyer | 4 | India | | Proposed | A follow-on project after Visakhapatnam class. Cost: ₹50,000 crore (US$5.2 billion). RFP timeline: 2027; Construction begin: 2030. |
| Project 18 class | | Stealth guided missile destroyer | 6 | India | 14,000 to 15,000 tonnes | Planned | RFP timeline: 2029; Construction begin: 2034. |

=== Frigates (FFG) ===
| Class | Picture | Type | No. of Ships | Origin | Displacement | Status | Note |
|---|---|---|---|---|---|---|---|
| Nilgiri-class | | Stealth guided missile frigate | 7 | India | 6,670 tonnes | 6 Active; 1 Launched | The last remaining ship is expected to be commissioned in Q4 2026 and is built by Garden Reach Shipbuilders & Engineers each. |
| Talwar-class | INS Tushil | Stealth guided missile frigate | 2 | India | 4,035 tonnes | 8 Active; 2 Launched | The two pending vessels are from the ship class's Batch 4 and are being constructed by Goa Shipyard. |
| Project 17B-class | | Stealth guided missile frigate | 7 | India | 8,000 tonnes | Planned | The project cleared by the Ministry of Defence (MoD). Cost: ₹70,000 crore (US$7.3 billion). RFP timeline: 16 September 2026; Construction begin: 2031. |

=== Corvettes ===
| Class | Picture | Type | No. of Ships | Origin | Displacement | Status | Note |
|---|---|---|---|---|---|---|---|
| Anti Submarine Warfare Shallow Water Craft | | Corvette (ASW) | 16 | India | 890–1,490 tonnes | 7 Active; 8 Launched; 1 Under construction | Designed for ASW roles in littoral waters. Out of the pending ships of this class, four belongs to Arnala subclass and five belongs to Mahe subclass. |
| Next Generation Missile Vessels | | Corvette (ASuW) | 6 | India | 1,437 tonnes | 2 under construction 4 planned | The contract for acquisition of six ships was signed with Cochin Shipyard at a cost of ₹9,805 crore (equivalent to ₹110 billion or US$1.1 billion in 2026). The first vessel is expected by March 2027. |
| Next generation corvette | | Corvette | 8 | India | 3,500 tonnes | On order | The contracts with Garden Reach Shipbuilders & Engineers for 5 vessels and Goa Shipyard for 3 vessels was signed on 2 November 2026 at a cost of ₹53,866.50 crore (US$5.6 billion). The first vessel is expected by 2030. |

=== Mine countermeasure vessels ===
| Class | Picture | Type | No. of Ships | Origin | Displacement | Status | Note |
|---|---|---|---|---|---|---|---|
| Mine Counter Measure Vessels (MCMV) | | Minesweeper | 12 | India | 2,800 Tons | Planned | On 3 July 2025, the Defence Acquisition Council authorised the Acceptance of Necessity (AoN) for the project. |

=== Multi Purpose Vessel ===
| Class | Picture | Type | No. of Ships | Origin | Displacement | Status | Note |
|---|---|---|---|---|---|---|---|
| Samarthak-class | | Multi Purpose Vessel (MPV) | 2 | India | 3,750 tonnes | 1 in service 1 under sea trails | On 25 March 2022, the Ministry of Defence signed a contract with Larsen & Toubro for acquisition of Two Multi-Purpose Vessels (MPVs) to be used for multi-role support functions such as maritime surveillance & patrol, launching/ recovery of torpedoes and operation of various types of aerial, surface and underwater targets for Gunnery/ ASW firing exercises at a cost of ₹887 crore (equivalent to ₹10 billion or US$110 million in 2026). |
| Next Generation Multi-Purpose Vessels | | Multi Purpose Vessel (MPV) | 2 | India | | 2 Planned | Request for Proposal expected soon as of 8 July 2025. |

=== Patrol vessels ===
| Class | Picture | Type | No. of Ships | Origin | Displacement | Status | Note |
|---|---|---|---|---|---|---|---|
| Shachi-class patrol vessel | | Offshore patrol vessel | 11 | India | 2,500 tonnes | 3 launched 5 under construction 3 approved | The contract for acquisition of 11 Next Generation Offshore Patrol Vessels under Buy (Indian-IDDM) category was signed with Goa Shipyard Ltd (GSL) and Garden Reach Shipbuilders and Engineers (GRSE) at a total cost of Rs 9,781 crore. The delivery of the ships is scheduled to commence from September 2026. |
| New Water Jet Fast Attack Craft (NWJFAC) | | Fast attack craft | 31 | India | 325 tonnes | Planned | Follow on water jet fast interceptor craft. The Defence Acquisition Council (DAC) granted an Acceptance of Necessity (AoN) for the procurement of 31 NWJFACs on 3rd December 2024. |
| FIC-1 | | Fast Interceptor Craft | 120 | India | | Planned | DAC approved the acquisition on 3 December 2024. Functions includes escort of high-value units, such as aircraft carriers, destroyers, frigates, and submarines for coastal defence. To be equipped with DRDO-developed Indigenous Waterjet Propulsion System. |
| Fast Patrol Boats | | Fast patrol boat | 6 | India | | Tender issued | The Request for Proposal (RFP), has been issued and bidding is open between 21 October 2025 and 13 January 2026. The FPBs, with indigenous content of >60%, will be employed for surveillance and reconnaissance roles by small insertion teams. |

=== Replenishment ships ===
| Class | Picture | Type | No. of Ships | Origin | Displacement | Status | Note |
|---|---|---|---|---|---|---|---|
| Surya class | | Fleet replenishment oiler | 5 | India | 45,000 tonnes | 1 Launched 4 under construction | Approved in 2014. Contract signed in August 2023. All ships to be delivered between 2027 and 2031. |

=== Survey vessels ===
| Class | Picture | Type | No. of Ships | Origin | Displacement | Status | Note |
|---|---|---|---|---|---|---|---|
| Next Generation survey Vessel | | Survey vessel | 6 | India | | Planned | Acceptance of Necessity (AoN), worth ₹3,300 crore (equivalent to ₹36 billion or US$370 million in 2026), cleared by the Defence Acquisition Council (DAC) on 15 September 2023.Cochin Shipyard was reported to be the lowest bidder for six ships at a cost of ₹6,000 crore (US$620 million), lower than L&T's bid on 11 February 2026. |

=== Miscellaneous ===
| Class | Picture | Type | No. of Ships | Origin | Displacement | Status | Note |
|---|---|---|---|---|---|---|---|
| Matangi | | Unmanned surface vehicle | 12 | India | | Under production. | Contract: Contract signed with Sagar Defence Engineering for 12 Autonomous Weaponized Boat Swarms on 8 January 2023. The Matangi was developed under a collaborative effort between Sagar Defence and Weapons and Electronics Systems Engineering Establishment (WESEE) of the Indian Navy. The programme was executed under the joint support of Indian Navy’s NIIO, TDAC and the iDEX initiative under the DIO.; Sea trials: Pre-delivery trials began in late October 2024 in Mumbai. A Matangi started a 850 nmi (1,570 km) sea transit, Sagarmala Parikrama, from Mumbai to Tuticorin in Autonomous mode, using the indigenous 'navigation & collision avoidance software'. The vessel was flagged off on 29 October 2024. The vessel travelled 350 nmi (650 km) to reach Karwar on 30 October completing the first leg. The second leg was 320 nmi (590 km) long to reach Kochi on 31 October. On 5 November, the vessel finally reached Tuticorin's V. O. Chidambaranar Port.; Delivery: On 30 January 2026, Sagar Defence has dispatched the first batch of two Autonomous Weaponized Boat Swarms from its Pune facility. The boats will be deployed on the west coast.; Specifications: Armament: 12.7 mm machine guns, fitted for but not with short-range missiles and loitering munitions. Capacity: 14 personnel (special missions) Capabilities: Operates in GPS-denied and network-centric warfare environments. Range: 400 nmi (740 km) Endurance: >2 days Roles: High-speed interdiction; surveillance; constabulary operations; and Command, Control, Communications, Computers (C4) Intelligence, Surveillance and Reconnaissance (C4ISR). |
| Compact Autonomous Surface Craft | | Unmanned surface vehicle | —N/a | India | —N/a | Cleared by the MoD | The Defence Acquisition Council (DAC) cleared the acquisition of these vessels on 5 August 2025. The vessels will be used in ASW roles to detect, classify and neutralise threats.BEL and WESEE of the Indian Navy has developed the A2NCS software suite for USVs. The software has been integrated onto an in-service fast interceptor boat and has been deployed for mine countermeasure roles and combat exercises. |
| Krishna class | | Training ship | 3 | India | 4,700 tonnes | Under construction (1 launched, 2 keels laid) | Union Cabinet has accorded approval to sign a contract with Larsen & Toubro for acquisition of three Cadet Training Ships, at an overall cost of Rs 3,108.09 crore. The delivery of ships is scheduled to commence from 2026. |
| National Hospital Ship (NHS) | | Hospital Ship | 1 | India | Unknown | Proposed | One National Hospital Ship is proposed to be acquired. The anticipated delivery timelines for the first vessel is maximum of 48 months from the date of contract. |
| Diving support craft (DSC) | | Diving support craft | 5 | India | 380 tonnes | 1 Active 2 launched 2 under construction | A contract for five Diving Support Craft (DSC) has been signed by Indian Navy with M/s Titagarh Rail Systems Ltd, Kolkata on 12 Feb 21. |
| Sullage Barges | | Barge | 4 | India | 300 tonnes | 1 launched (Yard 142), 2 under construction (Yard 143, 144), 1 ordered (Yard 145) | Order placed in November 2024, with M/s Suryadipta Projects Private Limited, Thane. |
| Bottom Opening Non-Propelled Barges | | Barge | 3 | India | 200 tonnes | 1 under construction (Yard 148), 2 ordered (Yard 149, 150) | Order placed on 16 January 2025, with M/s Suryadipta Projects Private Limited, Thane for the development and delivery of the barges. |
| Self Propelled Fuel Barges | | Fuel Barge | 4 | India | 500 tonnes | Under construction | Contract signed with M/s Shoft Shipyard Private Limited, Thane on 2 March 2026. The primary role of these barges will be replenishment of fuel to ships and submarines at harbours and dockyards. |
| Bhishm class | | Tugboat | 6 | India | | 6 Launched 2 Inducted | 25-tonne bollard pull tugs being constructed at Titagarh Rail Systems, Kolkata. |
| HSL-class | | Tugboat | 4 | India | | 4 Under construction | 10-tonne bollard pull tugs being constructed at Hindustan Shipyard |

== Aircraft ==
| Type | Picture | Role | No. of airframes | Origin | Status | Note |
Combat
| Twin Engine Deck Based Fighter (TEDBF) | | Carrier-based multirole fighter | N/A | India | Design Phase | The first flight of the TEDBF is targeted for 2032–33 with the fighter expected to be inducted into the Navy by 2038. |
| Dassault Rafale | | Carrier-based multirole fighter | 26 | France | On order | The acquisition is a part of the Multi-Role Carrier Borne Fighters programme to acquire 57 fighter jets for the carrier air wing of INS Vikrant. The quantity was revised to 26 jets. Rafale-M was chosen over the Boeing F/A-18E/F Super Hornet in 2023. The deal was signed in April 2025, with first aircraft delivery expected in August–September 2026, as of 23 March 2026. |
UAV
| Naval Shipborne Unmanned Aerial System (NSUAS) | | Unmanned Rotorcraft/Shipborne UAV | 40 | | Planned | Proposal to buy 10 NSUAS for around ₹ 1,300 crores cleared by the government in 2021. RFI to purchase total of 40 units released in 2023. The Defence Acquisition Council (DAC) cleared the procurement project for the Navy in July 2026. |
| Multi Utility Long Endurance Drone (MULE) | | Unmanned Rotorcraft/Shipborne UAV | | | Under development | Contract signed with Altair Infrasec for MULE RPA which will be a NSUAS class UAV.: Primary Roles: C4, ISTAR, SIGNIT, COMINT and Maritime Domain Awareness (MDA) operations for a Task Force. Secondary Roles: Anti-piracy, Anti-terrorist activities and assistance in Search and Rescue (SAR). Payloads: EO/IR, AIS, Maritime Patrol Radar, EW and communication relay with a capacity of >50 kg (110 lb). Endurance: >12 hours. |
| IAI-HAL NRUAV | | Unmanned Rotorcraft/Shipborne UAV | | IndiaIsrael | Planned | |
| MQ-9B SeaGuardian | | Unmanned combat aerial vehicle | 2 in service (on lease) 15 more on order. | United States | On order | The deal was signed on 15 October 2024. Deliveries to begin from January 2029. |
| Medium Altitude Long Endurance Drone (MALE) | | Unmanned aerial vehicle | | | Planned | Defence Acquisition Council (DAC) approved the procurement of 87 Medium Altitude Long Endurance (MALE) drones for the Indian Armed Forces. |
| NewSpace Abhimanyu | | Loyal wingman/ Unmanned combat aerial vehicle | | India | Under Development | Contract signed for development and procurement of specified number of systems. |
| NewSpace Arka | | High altitude pseudo-satellite | | India | Under Development | Contract signed for design & development of indigenous High Altitude Pseudo-Satellite (HAPS) for Indian Navy. |
| Medium Range Loitering Munition [LM(MR)] | | Loitering munition | | | Planned | RFI issued in September 2026. Ideal specifications include:– Range: >1,000 km, Endurance: >9 hours, Length: <2.5 m, Wingspan: <3 m, Sensors: Modular (with EO/IR seeker for ISR and targeting). Features: autonomous navigation (GNSS-denied), canister-launched, up to 10 munitions simultaneously managed by mission control unit, control hand-off between ship and land stations. |
Patrol / Utility
| Boeing P-8I Neptune | | Reconnaissance, ASW, ASuW | 12 in service | United States | 6 approved Awaiting CCS approval | The deal was approved by the Ministry of Defence on 12 February 2025. |
| Airbus C-295 | | Anti-submarine warfare/ Maritime patrol | 9 | European Union; India | Planned | Medium-range maritime reconnaissance (MRMR) aircraft: They will be equipped with advanced sensors, glass cockpit, advanced surveillance radar, ELINT, optical sensors and networking features. Ministry of Defence has given clearance for procurement on 16 February 2024. |
| Dornier 228 | | Anti-submarine warfare, Maritime patrol | 12 | India | (as of 2019) 4 in service 8 on order (upgraded variants) | These aircraft will be equipped with advanced sensors, glass cockpit, advanced surveillance radar, ELINT, optical sensors and networking features. |
| | | STOL Amphibious Aircraft | 4 | | Planned | On 7 January 2026, the Navy released an RFI to lease 4 amphibious aircraft for 4 years. The document is meant to seek the types available in the market and their capabilities. India had previously looked to purchase Shinmayawa US-2 floatplanes from Japan. |
Helicopter
| Sikorsky MH-60R | | Multi-Role Helicopter | 24 | United States | 22 delivered. | The helicopters will replace the aging Sea King Mk.42/A helicopters which were retired in the 1990s.: They are equipped with Mark 54 torpedoes and Hellfire air-to-surface missiles, along with precision-kill rockets. India signed a ₹15,157 crore (equivalent to ₹190 billion or US$2.0 billion in 2026) contract for the MH-60Rs in February 2020. |
| Deck Based Multi Role Helicopter | | Multi-Role Helicopter | 66 | India | Under development | It is the naval variant of the IMRH. The Navy joined the programme in July 2021. As of July 2025, the configuration studies are underway. |
| Naval Multi-Role Helicopter | | Multi-Role Helicopter | 123 | India | Planned | Previous tender: The first tender under Multi Role Helicopter (MRH) programme was issued in 2006. The same was cancelled and re-issued in September 2008. Sikorsky S-70B Seahawk and NHIndustries NH90 completed technical trials in 2011. The programme was delayed due to "undue technical waivers" complaints by NHI in 2012 and 2013 corruption allegations. The S-70B was selected in 2014. However, the deal was terminated due to overpricing and negotiation deadlock.; Stopgap measure: 24 MH-60Rs were sought through the FMS route in 2018–19. The deal was signed in February 2020. The deliveries are expected to be complete by 2026-end.; The NMRH is the successor to the MRH programme seeking to replace the Sea King Mk 42B/C fleet. Current status: June 2011 – an RFI for a requirement of 75 naval multi-role helicopter in the 9–12.5t class. 22 August 2017 – An RFI was issued to acquire 123 Naval Multi-Role Helicopter (NMRH), besides 111 Naval Utility Helicopters (NUH), through the Strategic Partnership model. The last date for the foreign OEMs to respond was 6 October. 33 would be dedicated to MARCOS use. The payload is expected to include 12 fully equipped troops, 400 kg equipment or 8 troops and an auto inflatable craft in a stowed configuration. |
| Naval Utility Helicopter | | Utility helicopter | 51 | India | Planned | First attempt: March 2010 – the Navy decided to not induct any further HAL Dhruv choppers and seek helicopters for utility and ASW roles as well as replace Chetak fleet to meet the long-term requirements. May 2010 – An RFI was issued 56 naval light utility helicopters with a gross weight of 4,500 kg (9,900 lb) and folding rotor blades to replace the HAL Chetak fleet. 2012 – An RfP (tender) was issued to AgustaWestland, Bell Helicopter, Boeing, Eurocopter, Kamov and Sikorsky to procure 56 Naval Utility Helicopters (NUH) at a cost of $1 billion by 2016. The deadline was January 2013. Likely contenders included AS565, S-76B and AW109 Koala LUH but not Dhruv. August 2014 – Tender cancelled along with the reconnaissance & surveillance helicopter (RSH) programme. The helicopter count was increased to 100.; Second attempt: 2015–16 – The Union government was expected to restart the NUH tender under the Make in India mode with foreign collaboration at a cost of over $2 billion. Reportedly, 11 Indian private sector companies including Tata Advanced Systems, Bharat Forge, Mahindra Aerospace, Reliance Defence & Aerospace and Larsen & Toubro were expected to respond with proposed joint ventures to offer Airbus AS565 MBe, Bell 429 and AgustaWestland Super Lynx 300. The Navy had a deficit of 61 shipborne helicopters. 22 August 2017 – An RFI was issued to acquire 111 Naval Utility Helicopters (NUH), besides 123 Naval Multi-Role Helicopter (NMRH), through the Strategic Partnership model. The last date for the foreign OEMs to respond was 6 October. 25 August 2018 – The Defence Acquisition Council (DAC) cleared the ₹21,738 crore (US$3.34 billion). While 16 would be imported in flyaway manner, the rest would be produced in India. The RfP would be issued in mid-2018. The weight would remain the same as the previous tender. The armament include one lightweight torpedo, 12.7 mm heavy machine guns and rocket launchers on both sides for light attack and ASW roles. The helicopter would be wheeled and have foldable rotor blades. 12 February 2019 – The RfP was published for the foreign OEMs and domestic Strategic Partners.; Third attempt: 7 April 2022 – The NUH was included into the third positive indigenisation list, eliminating direct participation by any foreign vendor. The Navy had issued the broad requirement of 60 ALH-based helicopters to HAL in January 2022. A detail project report for helicopter configuration, overall cost, including performance based logistics was prepared for the Navy HQ and MoD. This resulted in the concept of Utility Helicopter-Marine.; To replace HAL Chetak fleet across Navy and Coast Guard. Current status: August 2025 – the MoD released an RFI to procure 76 Naval Utility Helicopters meant for the Navy (51) and the Coast Guard (25). These will be assigned for roles like maritime SAR, CASEVAC, communication duties, and low-intensity maritime operations. Competitors – Utility Helicopter-Marine from HAL. Produced in India variant of AW169M design from Leonardo and Adani Defence & Aerospace. Procurement from US, France being reportedly considered. |
| Boeing V-22 Osprey | | Tiltrotor military transport aircraft | N/A | United States | Planned | Indian navy had proposed to acquire the V-22's airborne early warning and control variant to replace the short-range Kamov Ka-31. |

== Missile systems ==
| Name | Picture | Role | Warhead | Origin | Status | Ref |
|---|---|---|---|---|---|---|
| Supersonic Missile Assisted Release of Torpedo (SMART) | | Long-range ASM | Conventional Torpedo | India | Under trials | |
| Long Range – Anti Ship Missile (LRAShM) | | Long range AsuW | Hypersonic Glide Vehicle | India | Under trials | |
| NASM-SR | | Air-launched, anti-ship missile | | India | Under trials | |
| NASM-MR | | Air-launched, anti-ship missile | | India | Under trials | |
| Land Attack Cruise Missile | | Submarine-launched cruise missile | | | RFI issued in February 2026 to equip the conventional submarine fleet. | |

== See also ==
- List of active Indian Navy ships
- List of future equipment of the Indian Coast Guard
- Future of the Indian Air Force
- Future of rail transport in India
- Weapon systems of the Indian Navy
