= Shachi-class patrol vessel (2026) =

Series of eleven patrol vessels for the Indian Navy

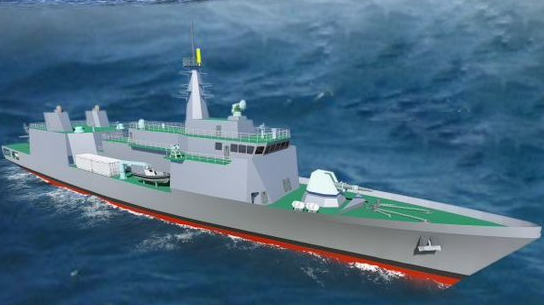
- Shachi class design

Class overview
- Builders: Goa Shipyard (GSL); Garden Reach Shipbuilders & Engineers (GRSE)
- Operators: Indian Navy
- Preceded by: Saryu class; Shachi class (2017) (cancelled)
- Cost: ₹9,781 crore (equivalent to ₹110 billion or US$1.1 billion in 2026); ₹889.18 crore (equivalent to ₹970 crore or US$100 million in 2026) per unit (FY 2023)
- Built: 2024 – present
- Planned: 11
- Building: 8
- Completed: 0
- Active: 0

General characteristics
- Type: Offshore patrol vessel
- Displacement: 3,000 t (2,953 long tons)
- Length: 113 m (370 ft 9 in)
- Beam: 14.6 m (47 ft 11 in)
- Draught: 4–5 m (13 ft 1 in – 16 ft 5 in)
- Propulsion: 2 × diesel engine
- Speed: 25 knots (46 km/h; 29 mph)
- Range: 8,500 nmi (15,700 km; 9,800 mi) at 14 knots (26 km/h; 16 mph) with 25% reserve fuel
- Endurance: 60 days (minimum)
- Complement: 20 officers including 4 women officers and 130 sailors
- Sensors & processing systems: Navigation radar; Fire-control radar; 1 × BEL Lynx-U2 (naval guns); 2 × EON-51 (CIWS)
- Electronic warfare & decoys: 1 × EW Suite; Decoys :-; 1 × Kavach decoy launchers; 1 × Maareech torpedo-countermeasure systems; 1 × XBT
- Armament: 1 × 76 mm/62 Oto Mellara Strales; 2 × 30 mm/65 AK-630 CIWS; 2 × VSHORADS; 2 × 12.7 mm SRCG; 2 × Acoustic Warning Device; Mine warfare via modular payload
- Aircraft carried: 1 × 15 t (15 long tons) helicopter with facility for UAVs
- Aviation facilities: Helipad with enclosed hangar (1 × multi-role helicopter or UAVs); Storage for Light Weight Torpedoes Shyena for helicopter.

The Shachi-class offshore patrol vessels are large patrol crafts being built at the Goa Shipyard Limited (GSL) and Garden Reach Shipbuilders & Engineers (GRSE) for the Indian Navy. The deal was signed on 30 March 2023 with the delivery of the ships scheduled to commence from September 2026. The primary role of the vessels to maintain the Indian Navy's combat capability and meet various operational requirements such as anti piracy, counter-infiltration, anti poaching, anti trafficking, non combatant evacuation operations, Search and Rescue (SAR), protection of offshore assets and mine warfare.

== History ==
The Next-Generation Offshore Patrol Vessel project is a follow on of the cancelled Shachi class project which was eventually cancelled due to an inordinate delay of more than 10 years. Initially, the Indian Navy signed a contract for five offshore patrol vessel to be built by the erstwhile Pipavav Shipyard (later,Reliance Defence and Engineering; now, Swan Defence and Heavy Industries Limited). Numerous delays in the project, initially due to change of design partner and subsequently due to financial issues led to the cancellation of the project in October 2020.

The Indian Navy re-released a new RFI in 2017 for six ships which was later cleared by the Defence Acquisition Council (DAC) in 2018 for a price of ₹4,941 crore (equivalent to ₹72 billion or US$750 million in 2026). Later on, the number of ships to be built was increased to eleven to compensate for the time lost due to the cancelled Shachi class project.

The project was subjected to competitive bidding and shipyards across the country participated. Amongst the public sector participants were Cochin Shipyard, Garden Reach Shipbuilders & Engineers, Goa Shipyard, Hindustan Shipyard and Mazagon Dock while Larsen & Toubro was the sole private bidder. Goa Shipyard was declared the lowest bidder (L1) while Garden Reach Shipbuilders & Engineers was the second lowest L2. Contract was subsequently signed with both the shipyards.

== Construction ==
The deal for the construction of 11 ships was signed on 30 March 2023 by Ministry of Defence with Goa Shipyard (GSL) and Garden Reach Shipbuilders & Engineers (GRSE) for a total value of ₹9,781 crore (equivalent to ₹110 billion or US$1.1 billion in 2026). Of the 11 ships, seven will be designed, developed and manufactured by GSL and four by GRSE. The delivery of the ships is scheduled to commence from September 2026. The order value share for the Goa Shipyard (GSL) is ₹6,200 crore (equivalent to ₹68 billion or US$700 million in 2026) while that of Garden Reach Shipbuilders & Engineers (GRSE) is ₹3,500 crore (equivalent to ₹38 billion or US$400 million in 2026).

The first ship is expected to be delivered within 44 months from the date of signing the contract with the final delivery to be complete within seven and half years.

On the same date, MoD also ordered 13 units of BEL Lynx-U2 Fire Control Radar worth ₹1,700 crore (equivalent to ₹19 billion or US$190 million in 2026) for the NGOPV programme.

On 24 February and 27 March 2024, GRSE and GSL began the construction of the first two of their respective NGOPVs with the steel cutting ceremony.

On 8 February 2025, MoD placed an order for 28 BEL EON-51 FCS, worth ₹642 crore (equivalent to ₹663 crore or US$69 million in 2026), to complement AK-630s onboard 11 NGOPVs and 3 Cadet Training Ships.

Keel for the second and third OPV (Y1281 and Y1822) from Goa Shipyard's lot was laid at the shipyard of Yeoman Marine Services Private Limited (YMSPL), Ratnagiri on 23 March 2025. The main hull blocks of the vessels are being fabricated at YMSPL's Ratnagiri facility as part of the build strategy of GSL.

== Design ==
The ships will have a displacement of 2,500–2,900 tonnes (2,461–2,854 long tons) and a length of 105–110 metres (344 ft 6 in – 360 ft 11 in) depending upon the design opted by either of the shipyard. They will have a cruising speed of 14 knots (26 km/h; 16 mph) with a maximum speed greater than 25 knots (46 km/h; 29 mph) and an operating range of 8,500 nautical miles (15,700 km; 9,800 mi) at a speed of 14–15 knots (26–28 km/h; 16–17 mph). The ships will be equipped with state of the art facility and a hangar which can accommodate one HAL Dhruv. The Helipad can accommodate a helicopter of 15 t (15 long tons) with facility to operate UAVs.

These ship will be able to perform mine warfare roles with modular payload, presumably by the usage of UUVs and autonomous mine laying vehicles. The ship would be equipped with light weapons like 76mm main cannon along with CIWS systems and counter-measure system like Kavach decoy launchers and Maareech torpedo-countermeasure systems.

The CIWS will be partnered with EON-51 FCS, an electro optical fire-control system capable of search, detection and classification of targets by employing devices like Electro Optical and Thermal Imagers.

The ship will have the ability to store Shyena torpedoes for helicopter.

== Ships of the class ==
Name	Pennant	Yard No	Builder	Keel laid	Launched	Delivered	Commissioned	Homeport	Status
Indian Navy
Shachi		1280	Goa Shipyard	3 May 2024	31 March 2026				Launched
		1281	Goa Shipyard	23 March 2025 (Note: The keels were laid at the shipyard of Yeoman Marine Services)					Under construction
		1282	Goa Shipyard	23 March 2025					Under construction
Srishti		1283	Goa Shipyard	9 June 2025	27 October 2026				Launched
		1284	Goa Shipyard						Ordered
		1285	Goa Shipyard						Ordered
		1286	Goa Shipyard						Ordered
Shruti		3037	Garden Reach Shipbuilders & Engineers	5 November 2024	11 August 2026				Launched
		3038	Garden Reach Shipbuilders & Engineers	5 November 2024					Under construction
Sanghmitra		3039	Garden Reach Shipbuilders & Engineers	11 April 2025	20 May 2026				Launched
Shreyas		3040	Garden Reach Shipbuilders & Engineers	25 April 2025	10 October 2026				Launched

either scheduled or estimated dates

== See also ==
- Future of the Indian Navy
- Next Generation Offshore Patrol Vessel (Indian Coast Guard)
