= MRSV =

MRSV may refer to:

- Maize red stripe virus, a plant virus
- Member of the Royal Society of Victoria, a post-nominal title
- Multi-role support vessels in the Indian Navy amphibious vessel acquisition project
- The ICAO code for San Vito de Java Airport in Costa Rica
- For a given Rust crate, its Minimum Supported Rust Version

== See also ==
- Multi-role support ship (disambiguation)
