= Shachi (disambiguation) =

Shachi may refer to:

- Shachi (Sanskrit: शची, IAST: Śacī), also known as Indrani (Sanskrit: इन्द्राणी, IAST: Indrāṇī), a Hindu goddess
- Shachi (鯱) or shachihoko (鯱鉾 / 鯱), an animal in Japanese folklore with the head of a tiger and the body of a carp
- Team Shachi, formerly Team Syachihoko (チームしゃちほこ) a Japanese female idol group
- Shachi-class offshore patrol vessel, Indian patrol boat project scrapped after delay
- Shachi Pai (born 10 October 1998) an Indian-born woman cricketer who currently plays for Derbyshire
