= MSRV =

MSRV or MSRv may refer to:

- Multiple sclerosis retrovirus, a virus belonging to the Human Endogenous Retrovirus-W family
- Sentinel-class maritime security and response vessels, of the Navy of Singapore
- The bibcode abbreviation for the scientific journal Mass Spectrometry Reviews
- Minimum Supported Rust Version: the minimum version of the Rust programming language that supports the features necessary to build a particular crate

== See also ==
- MRSV (disambiguation)
