= Krishna-class training ship =

Class of future Indian Navy training ships

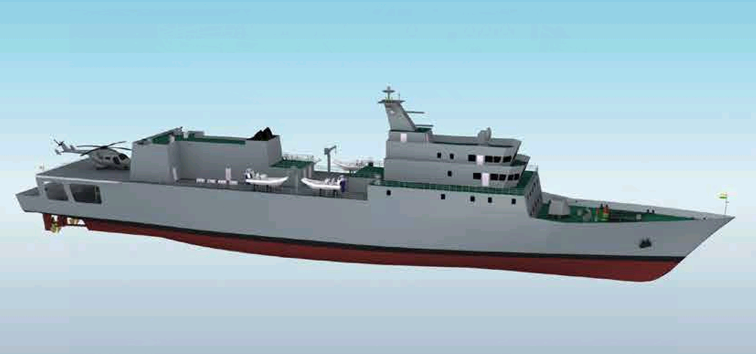
- L&T cadet training ship

Class overview
- Name: Krishna-class
- Builders: Kattupalli Shipyard, Chennai, India
- Operators: Indian Navy
- Preceded by: Tir-class; INS Krishna
- Cost: ₹3,108.09 crore (equivalent to ₹34 billion or US$360 million in 2026) for three ships (FY 2023); ₹1,036 crore (equivalent to ₹11 billion or US$120 million in 2026) per ship (FY 2023)
- Built: 2024-
- Planned: 3
- Building: 3

General characteristics
- Type: Cadet Training Ship (CTS)
- Displacement: 4,700 tonnes (4,626 long tons)
- Length: 122 m (400 ft 3 in)
- Beam: 18 m (59 ft 1 in)
- Propulsion: 2 × Caterpillar C280-12 diesel engines; Twin shaft with a controllable pitch propeller
- Speed: 20 knots (37 km/h; 23 mph) (Maximum); 15 knots (28 km/h; 17 mph) (Cruise)
- Range: 12,070 km (6,520 NM) at cruising speed
- Endurance: 60 days
- Complement: 20 officers, 150 sailors, and 200 cadets
- Sensors & processing systems: 2 × I-Band commercial navigation radars; Combat Management System (CMS); Data link systems
- Armament: 1 × OTO Melara 76 mm naval gun with fire-control system; 2 × AK-630M CIWS with EON-51 FCS; 12.7 mm guns with FCS; 2 × OFT 12.7 mm M2 Stabilized Remote Controlled Gun
- Aviation facilities: 2 × Naval Utility Helicopters (NUH) with one in deck

Krishna-class training ship is a series of three cadet training ships (CDTs) under construction for the Indian Navy by L&T Shipbuilding in Kattupalli Shipyard near Chennai, India.

== Design ==
The L&T-class training vessels have a length of 122 meters and a beam of 18 meters with a displacement of around 4,700 tonnes and a design speed of over 20 knots. These vessels will have an endurance of 60 days. The ship has a range of 12,070 km at 15 knots. The ship can accommodate 20 officers, 150 sailors, and 200 cadets. The training vessels will have three classrooms with space for 70 cadets each, a chart house, and special training bridges for cadets. The CTS will feature a quick-reaction team room, magazines and weaponry supplies, and distinct spaces for mechanical and aircraft. Additionally, they will have logistical areas like quarter-decks, boat decks, accommodation ladders, and galleys. The ships will have an automatic "Helo landing and traversing system" for on-board helicopter operations. Armaments include OTO Melara 76 mm naval gun, 2 AK-630 CIWS (with EON-51 FCS) and 12.7 mm calibre machine guns equipped with each Fire Control System. The vessels are based on an L&T's in-house design.

The CIWS will be partnered with EON-51 FCS, an electro optical fire-control system capable of search, detection and classification of targets by employing devices like Electro Optical and Thermal Imagers.

Following the basic training, these ships will support the at-sea training of officer cadets, including female cadets, to fulfil the future requirements of the Indian Navy. In an effort to improve diplomatic ties, the ships would also train cadets from friendly nations. The ships can also be used for evacuation of people and Humanitarian Assistance and Disaster Relief (HADR).

== Construction history ==
On 7 March 2023, the Ministry of Defence awarded the contract for three Cadet Training Ships to Larsen & Toubro. The cost of the project amounts to ₹3,108.09 crore (equivalent to ₹34 billion or US$360 million in 2026). Under the Buy (Indian-IDDM) Category, L&T will design, develop, and manufacture these ships indigenously. As per the contract, the delivery of the ships will commence from 2026.

The main contractor is L&T Defence, while the ships will be built in the facilities of L&T Shipbuilding. Bharat Electronics signed a ₹8.47 billion (equivalent to ₹9.0 billion or US$96 million in 2026) contract with L&T in March 2024 to supply 14 types of communications and electronic warfare systems for the cadet training ships.

On 25 February 2024, the keel of the first Cadet Training ship was laid. The ceremony was presided by Rear Admiral Ravi Kumar Dhingra, Flag Officer Tamil Nadu and Puducherry Area and presence of other important officers.

On 20 April 2024, steel cutting ceremony of the third ship was held in Kattupalli Shipyard.

On 3 June 2024, the keel of the second ship was laid. The ceremony was presided by Rear Admiral Sandeep Mehta, Assistant Controller of Warship Production and Acquisition (ACWP&A). The Head Shipbuilding Business, L&T, RAdm G K Harish (retd.) was also present along with other officers from Navy and L&T.

On 8 February 2025, MoD placed an order for 28 BEL EON-51 FCS, worth ₹642 crore (equivalent to ₹663 crore or US$71 million in 2026), to complement AK-630s onboard 3 cadet training ships and 11 NGOPVs.

The first ship, christened Krishna, was launched on 17 February 2026.

== Ships in class ==
| Name | Yard Number | Pennant Number | Keel Laid | Launched | Commissioned | Home Port | Status |
|---|---|---|---|---|---|---|---|
| Krishna | Y-18003 | | 29 February 2024 | 17 February 2026 | | | Launched |
| Vessel 2 | Y-18004 | | 3 June 2024 | | | | Under Construction |
| Vessel 3 | Y-18005 | | 30 December 2024 | | | | Under Construction |

== See also ==
- INS Tir (A86)
- INS Krishna
- HMIS Kistna
- Future of the Indian Navy
- Training ships of the Indian Navy
