= Indian Navy amphibious vessel acquisition project =

Class of future "Landing Platform Docks" (LPD) of the Indian Navy

Class overview
- Operators: Indian Navy
- Preceded by: INS Jalashwa (L41)
- Planned: 4

General characteristics
- Type: Landing Platform Dock (LPD)
- Displacement: 29,000 t (29,000 long tons; 32,000 short tons)
- Length: 220 m (720 ft)
- Draught: ≤8 m (26 ft)
- Propulsion: Integrated full electric propulsion (IFEP)
- Speed: ≥ 20 knots (37 km/h) (Maximum) 14–16 knots (26–30 km/h) (Cruising Speed)
- Range: 10,000 nmi (19,000 km; 12,000 mi) At economic speed and 25% reserve fuel)
- Endurance: ≥ 45 days (In terms of machinery/fuel) 60 days (In terms of logistics support for troops)
- Boats & landing craft carried: 4 × Landing Craft Vehicle Personnel (LCVP); 4 × Landing Craft Mechanized (LCM); 2 × Landing Craft Air Cushion (LCAC)
- Troops: 900
- Complement: 530 officers and sailors
- Sensors & processing systems: "Combat Management System" (CMS); 1 × E/F-band Air-search/Surface-search radar; 1 × C/D-band Air-surveillance radar; 1 × Surface-search radar; 2 × I-band radar; 1 × E/F-band COTS radar; 1 × Infrared search and track (IRST) system
- Armament: Surface-to-air missiles: 32 × VL-SRSAM; Anti-ship/Anti-surface weaponry: 16 × Surface-to-surface missiles (SSM); Anti-submarine weaponry: "Anti-Torpedo Decoy System" (ATDS); Guns: 4 × AK-630M CIWS (To be equipped with Electro-optical sensor (EOFCS)); 4 × OFT 12.7 mm M2 Stabilized Remote Controlled Gun; 8 × Medium machine gun (MMG); 4 × "Portable Saluting Guns"
- Aircraft carried: Fixed-wing naval drones
- Notes: References:

The procurement of Landing Platform Docks (LPD) by the Indian Navy is an initiative of the Indian Navy (IN) to procure a series of landing platform docks, specific vessels dedicated to amphibious warfare, as part of the service's strategy to augment its capabilities of amphibious warfare, disaster-response, humanitarian assistance and auxiliary duties.

India had long sought to procure amphibious warfare vessels, including landing platform docks; multiple initiatives in procuring specified vessels of the aforementioned type were initiated as early as 2009. However, such measures have been frequently delayed, on account of varying reasons.

The IN currently operates one landing platform dock — INS Jalashwa, an ex-Austin-class amphibious transport dock, which was purchased from the United States Navy (USN) in 2007.

== History ==
=== Origins ===
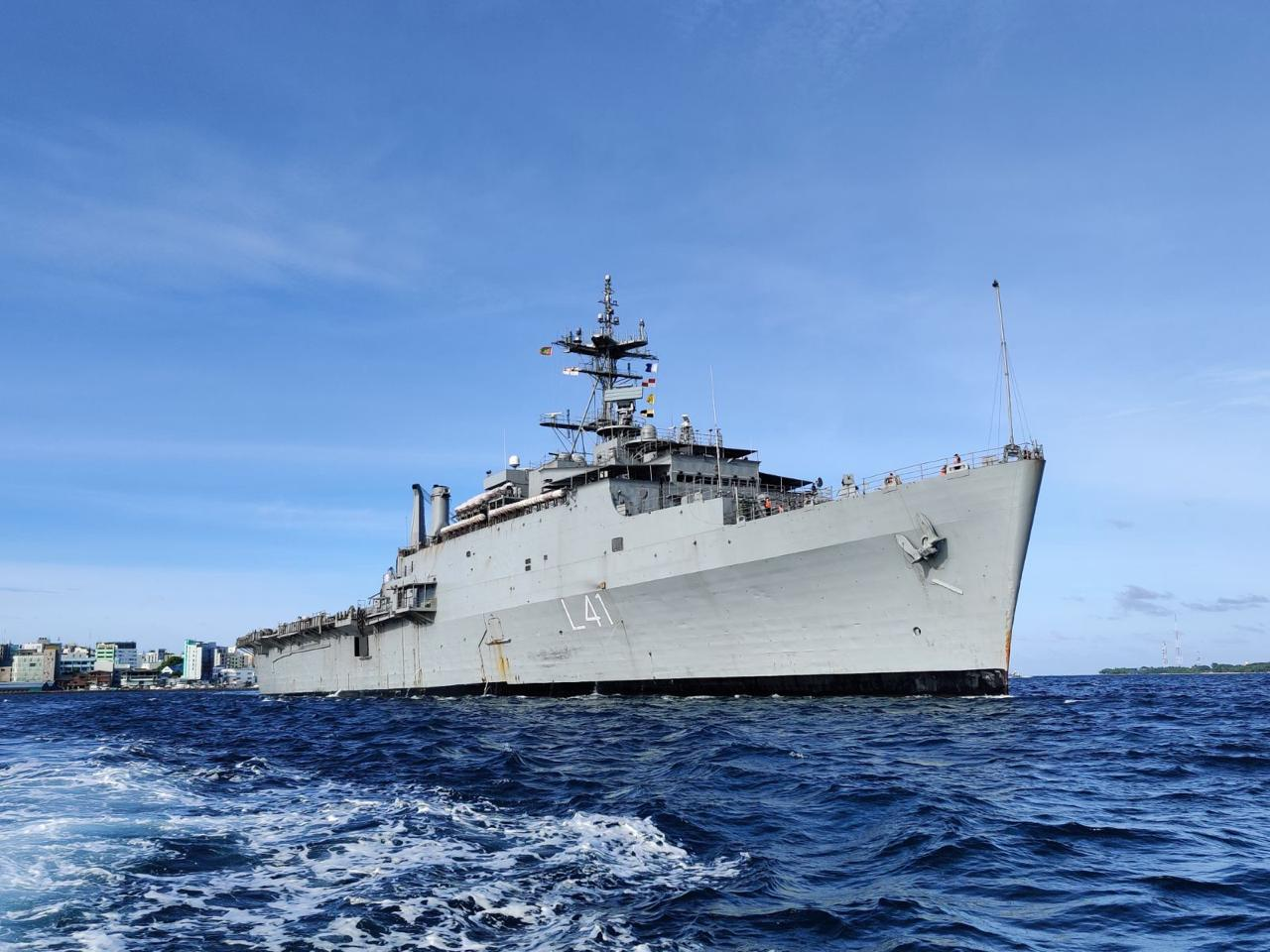
INS Jalashwa - the IN's sole operational landing platform dock

Since 2004, the IN had sought to procure amphibious warfare vessels to augment its capabilities of amphibious warfare, disaster-response management and evacuation of civilians and personnel.

In the wake of the 2004 Indian Ocean tsunami, the Indian Armed Forces initiated one of the largest Humanitarian Assistance and Disaster Relief (HADR) operations in its history; the navy quickly dispatched Indian naval vessels to send supplies to multiple countries that had been affected by the tsunami, namely, Sri Lanka, Indonesia and the Maldives. However, the experience unraveled a significant drawback - India's naval forces barely possessed the capability to undertake amphibious transport operations nor humanitarian assistance operations on a large scale, although it operated landing tank crafts, which were capable of undertaking amphibious operations, albeit at a limited capacity.

With the revelation of the issue, India quickly sought to procure amphibious vessels capable of tackling the issues of amphibious warfare and disaster response management. In 2007, the Indian government purchased the USS Trenton, a decommissioned Austin-class amphibious transport dock from the United States Navy (USN) and re-commissioned it as the INS Jalashwa. Since its re-commissioning, Jalashwa executed numerous disaster-response and humanitarian-relief operations, most notably during the COVID-19 pandemic.

In addition Jalashwa, India was also offered the USS Nashville, another Austin-class vessel; however, the purchase was never made.

=== Landing Platform Dock acquisition attempt (2013) ===
The Naval Staff Qualitative Requirements (NSQR) for the Landing Platform Docks were frozen in 2008. In October 2010, the Navy decided to acquire a fleet of amphibious assault vessels at a cost of ₹16,000 crore (US$3.5 billion).

By 13 February 2011, the Navy had released a Request For Information (RFI) to procure four Landing Platform Docks that will operate along with the operational INS Jalashwa. Indian shipyards, whether private or public, were expected to form a partnership with a foreign shipyard for the contract. The ships were expected to have an approximate length of 200 meters and be equipped with a point-defense missile system and a close-in weapon system. As of May 2012, the Navy was reportedly one or two years away from finalising the design and proceeding for a government approval. In January 2012, HSL was expected to receive a contract worth ₹8,000 crore (equivalent to ₹83 billion or US$860 million in 2026) from the defence ministry to construct two of the LPDs under the programme. The deal would be inked within few months.

In December 2013, the service had issued a Request For Proposal (RFP), a tender, to three domestic shipbuilders — L&T Shipbuilding (L&T), ABG Shipyard (ABGSL) and Pipavav Shipyard [later acquired by Reliance and renamed as Reliance Defence and Engineering Limited (RDEL) and Reliance Naval and Engineering Limited (RNEL)]. Under the US$2.65 billion project, the winner of the bid would be requested to build two landing platform docks, while the remaining two were to be built by the state-owned Hindustan Shipyard Limited (HSL) at the same cost.

While the length of the ships were capped at 215 meters, the draft would be not more than 8 meters. The 20,000 tonne ships were also required to be powered by an electric propulsion system to sustain 45 days at sea with a maximum speed of 20 knots. The vessels would have the capacity to embark six main battle tanks, 20 infantry combat vehicles and 40 heavy trucks. Additionally, the LPD would accommodate 1,430 personnel (60 officers, 470 sailors and 900 troops — an Army battalion) and armed with point-defense missile system, a close-in weapon system, an anti-torpedo decoy system, a chaff system, and heavy and light machine guns.

In September 2014, it was reported that the defence ministry had rejected the bid of Cochin Shipyard to participate in the project. The ministry stated that the tender is directed for the private sector shipyards only. Earlier, CSL had approached the then defence minister, A. K. Antony, through the then Ministry of Shipping. In response, the deal was put on hold. A committee, under the chairmanship of an Additional Secretary, was formed to decide whether the tender had to be retracted or CSL could also be issued in the tender. Though the report was submitted in February 2024 to the Defence Acquisition Council (DAC), the arms acquisition body of India's Ministry of Defence (MoD), but the case did not proceed further until the 2014 Indian general election.

In September 2016, the defence ministry was reportedly allowed to open the commercial bids for the LPD project during a DAC meet. Discussions on whether HSL would be given the contract for two of the LPDs was expected. Only RDEL and L&T had cleared the financial and technical trials conducted in September. Meanwhile, ABG Shipyard Limited (ABGSL), who had partnered with the US-based Alion (later acquired by Huntington Ingalls Industries), failed the corporate debt restructuring (CDR) in February 2016 and was disqualified from the project on financial grounds. While L&T had partnered with Spain-based Navantia, RDEL formed an alliance with France-based DCNS (now Naval Group).

By March 2017, it was expected that the contract for two LPDs to HSL would be dropped and all four LPDs would be constructed by a private firm. There were additional delays in 2015 when Pipavav Shipyard went bankrupt and was eventually taken over by Reliance's RDEL. Later, the shipyard again underwent two sets of assessments to be cleared as financially capable to receive the project. As of 4 May, the MoD was again expected to invite revised commercial bids from two the shortlisted companies since the price validity had expired in April and the number of extensions that could be granted had exceeded the limit of the Defence Procurement Procedures (DPP) protocol. On 21 May 2017, the Defence Acquisition Council (DAC) granted the in-principle approval for the construction of the four vessels. The contract was expected to be finalised by year-end.

In January 2018, the government re-issued an RFP to RDEL and L&T. The deadline to submit their bids were set on 22 June. As per the RFP, the first ship was to be delivered within four years of signing the contract and the last within seven years of the same. The displacement range of the warships were raised to 30,000–40,000. The contract would be worth around ₹25,000 crore (US$3.66 billion).

Reportedly, L&T had offered Navantia's Juan Carlos I-class design while RDEL proposed the Mistral-class landing helicopter dock design of DCNS.

=== Cancellation ===
As reported on 18 September 2019, the Indian Navy had sought to cancel the tender. The Navy also did not open the re-submitted bids to determine the L1 (lowest) bidder since the service had reservations on the capability of one of the contenders to deliver the project on time. Later, in January 2020, RNEL was pulled into a corporate insolvency case. With ABG disqualified from competing and RDEL on the brink of bankruptcy, L&T prevailed as the only qualified contender capable of handling the project; nonetheless, the MoD favored several suggestions of scrapping the tender, in order to circumvent the single-vendor situation.

In September 2020, the Comptroller and Auditor General of India (CAG) criticised the service over its failure to proceed with the project and lambasted the project's long-period of inactivity. The CAG pointed out to set a deadline for obtaining the corporate debt restructuring exit certificate by one of the participating firms.

On 25 September 2020, the tender for the project was officially withdrawn. From its inception in 2013 till 2020, the LPD project underwent nine extensions and one re-submission of bids. The emergence of a single-vendor situation was a major factor in cancelling the tender. The Navy is expected to reset its qualitative requirements (QR) for the project since the current QR was frozen back in 2008 and the evolution of next generation standards were needed to be factored in. The following competition is expected to include a wider participation for public shipyards. The process is expected to take time.

By November 2020, the Navy was preparing a new Request for Proposal for two LPD ships. This reduction of quantity was reportedly due to budgetary constraints and inadequate funding. Additional two ships could be acquired at a later stage based on the Navy's priority and necessity. Availability of resources and troops trained in amphibious operations were factors that would be considered to frame the requirements.

== Current status ==
In August 2021, the Indian Navy issued a new Request for Information (RFI) for the procurement of four "through-deck" landing platform docks to domestic Indian shipyards, under guidelines of its "Defence Acquisition Procedure 2020" (DAP-2020). According to the details of the RFI, the first vessel built should be ready for delivery within 60 months of the contract being signed, while the remaining three should be delivered at one-year intervals. Further specifications of the RFI dictated that the competing Indian shipyards must seek Transfer of Technology (ToT) from a foreign naval shipbuilder, and that the four prescribed vessels must be built in India, with a proportion of indigenous content.

As reported on 21 September 2025, a high-level meeting of the Defence Acquisition Council (DAC), under the Ministry of Defence (MoD) was soon expected to take up the Indian Navy proposal. When cleared, the Navy is expected to issue the tender for the project soon. The role of the vessels include the operating bases for fixed-wing naval drones, function as the command and control centres for prolonged shore operations as well as transport and deploy large-scale troops during amphibians operations.

The Acceptance of Necessity (AoN) for the project, worth ₹33,000 crore (equivalent to ₹340 billion or US$3.5 billion in 2026), was accorded by the Defence Acquisition Council on 23 October 2025. Each vessel is expected to have a displacement of around 20,000 tonnes. This is the largest project, among all of the projects with an overall worth of ₹79,000 crore (equivalent to ₹820 billion or US$8.5 billion in 2026), to be cleared in the meeting.

The request for proposal (RfP) for the four ships was issued by mid October 2026 to the shortlisted shipyards.

=== Partnerships ===
On 28 October 2025, Mazagon Dock Shipbuilders (MDL) and Swan Defence and Heavy Industries Limited (SDHI) signed an Teaming Agreement (TA) to partner for the LPD project of the Indian Navy. The agreement includes both design and construction of the vessels which will be undertaken by MDL and Swan Defence, respectively.

On 11 November 2025, HD Hyundai Heavy Industries announced a memorandum of understanding (MoU) with the Cochin Shipyard Limited (CSL) to co-operate on this project. Under the project, Hyundai will provide support to CSL in project planning, procurement, productivity enhancement and personnel training for the Indian Navy LPD programme.

On 9 October 2026, Navantia signed an MoU with Larsen & Toubro (L&T) to offer a design to the Indian Navy derived from the Juan Carlos I landing helicopter dock under the LPD project. The alliance, formalised in Madrid, would combine ship design experience of Navantia with the engineering and shipbuilding capabilities of L&T to develop local capacity for large-ship construction. The design was also offered to Indian in 2018.

=== Planned capabilities ===
- To undertake "Out-of-Area Contingencies" (OOAC).
- To support/assist land-based operations.
- To execute disaster-response and humanitarian-relief operations.
- To undertake fleet-support functions through replenishment capability and comprehensive workshop facilities.
- To provide medical facilities for the treatment of battle-casualties.

=== Propulsion system ===
On 22 April 2022, the Joint Working Group on India-UK Electric Propulsion Capability Partnership was established following a Joint Statement of the Indian Prime Minister, Narendra Modi, and UK Prime Minister, Boris Johnson. The working group is meant to establish a strong partnership between the respective navies and develop Electric Propulsion for India. On 28 April, India's Bharat Heavy Electricals Limited (BHEL) and GE Power Conversion signed a Memorandum of Understanding to collaborate in developments in the field of Integrated Full Electric Propulsion System.

On 28 November 2024, Indian Ministry of Defence and UK MoD signed a Statement of Intent (SoI) for the Cooperation on Design & Development of Electric Propulsion Systems for the Indian Navy. The system developed will be used to propel future Indian Naval Ships including the series of four Landing Platform Docks to be built in Indian Shipyards.

An agreement worth £250 million (US$342.47 million) was signed on 8 October 2025 when the Prime Minister of the UK and India, Keir Starmer and Narendra Modi, met in Mumbai during the visit of the UK Carrier Strike Group's visit to India. This agreement will further advance the development of electric-powered engines for naval ships. Rolls-Royce Holdings will have a role in the development. The firm has also developed the MT30 engines which power the Queen Elizabeth-class aircraft carriers.

An annual meeting "India–UK Electric Propulsion Capability Partnership Working Group" is held to discuss the framework to develop and manufacture EP systems. A land-based testing system will also be developed in India.

The Acceptance of Necessity (AoN) for 4 units of MW Marine Gas Turbine based Electric Power Generator for the project was accorded by the Defence Acquisition Council on 12 February 2025.

An Inter-Governmental Agreement (IGA) is expected to be signed between India and UK for the joint development of Integrated Full Electric Propulsion technology for the LPD project as of August 2026. UK's GE Vernova and India's Bharat Heavy Electricals Limited (BHEL) are part of the propulsion programme. A maritime land-based testing facility will be established in India for the development and testing of the integrated propulsion architecture on land before warship integration.

== Potential Contenders ==
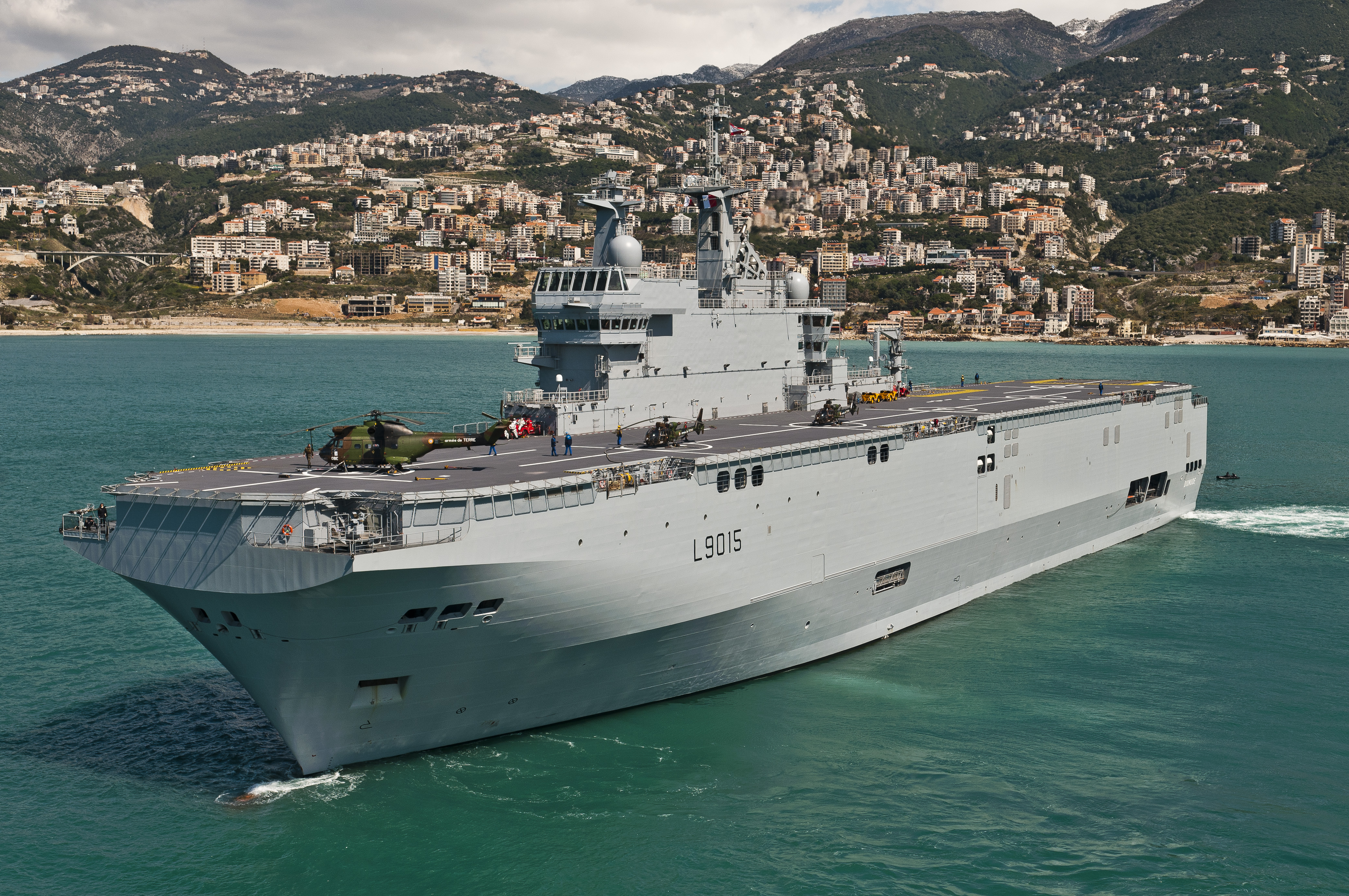
The Mistral-class amphibious assault vessel, designed by Naval Group

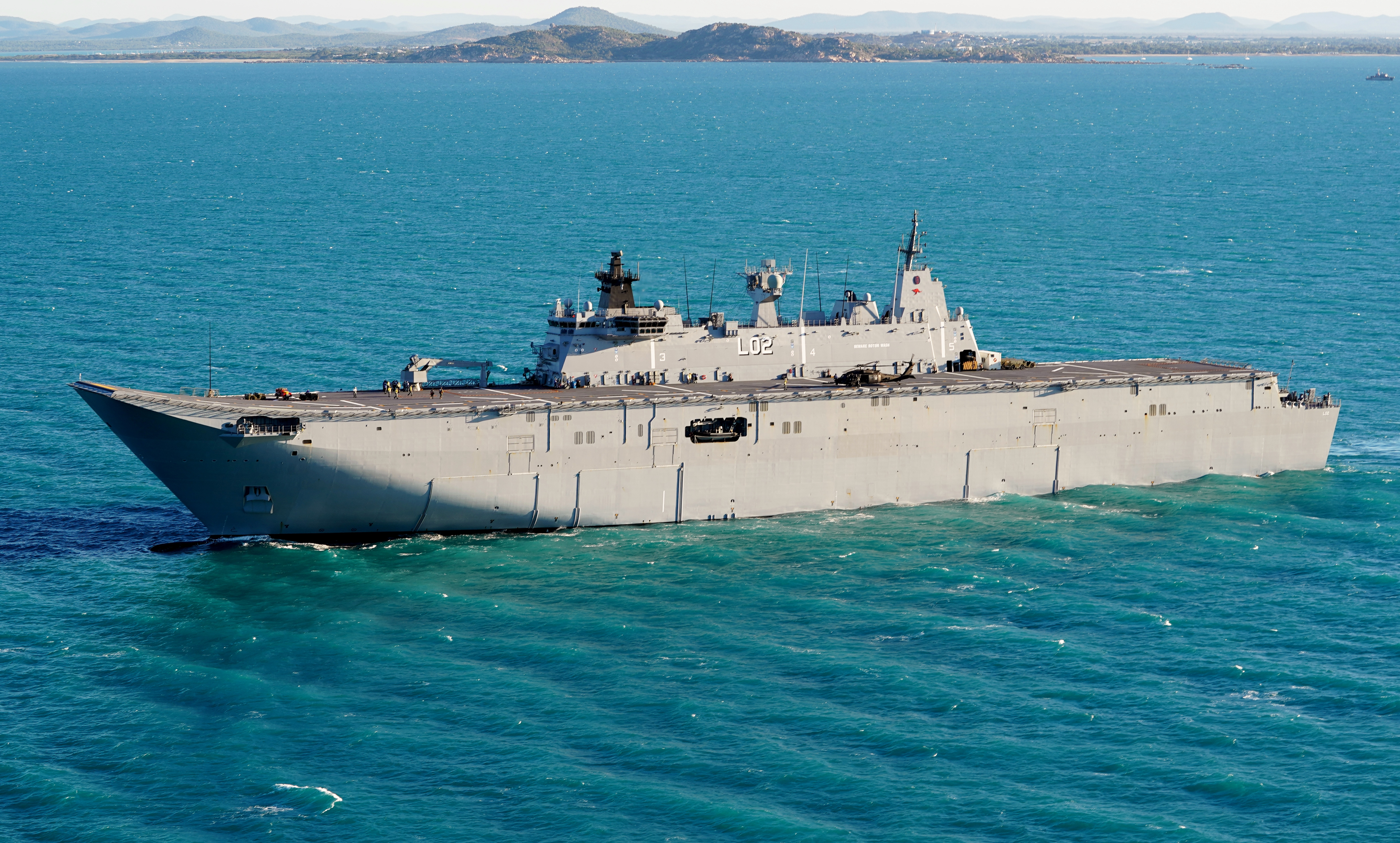
The Juan Carlos I-class amphibious assault vessel, designed by Navantia

=== Potential Shipyards ===
- Cochin Shipyard Limited (CSL) :
  - Based in Kochi, CSL is the largest shipbuilder in India and has long been a supplier to the IN. Was principally involved in the construction of India's first indigenously designed aircraft carrier, INS Vikrant and many other vessels of the Navy, Coast Guard and Commercial ventures. Also a hub for Naval Ship Maintenance and Training. CSL and HD Hyundai have tied up to bid for the Indian Navy's LPD.
- L&T Shipbuilding (L&T) :
  - Based in Hazira and Kattupalli, L&T is a noted supplier to the IN and the Indian Coast Guard (ICG). L&T's Hazira-based shipyard has the capability to build large vessels, with a tonnage of 20,000 t (20,000 long tons), with a length of 160 m (524 ft 11 in). L&T has tied up with Navantia for this offering, similar to the 2013 RFP
- Mazagon Dock Limited (MDL) :
  - Based in Mumbai, MDL is a distinguished supplier to the IN; having delivered numerous warships, including the Visakhapatnam-class destroyers, the Kolkata-class destroyers, the Shivalik-class frigates and the Kalvari-class submarines. MDL and Swan have an exclusive teaming arrangement to offer LPD for the Indian Navy. Swan owns Pipavav shipyards, which in the 2013 RFP had tied up with France's Naval Group, though at that time, Pipavav had been under ownership of Reliance Defence (RDEL)
- Garden Reach Shipbuilders & Engineers (GRSE) :
  - Based in Kolkata, GRSE has long been a supplier to the IN; having delivered over 100 warships, including the Shardul-class amphibious warfare vessels, and the Mk. IV LCU landing craft vessels among their amphibious assault warships among other surface combatants like the Nilgiri-class frigates, the Kamorta-class corvettes, the Aditya-class auxiliary vessels.

=== Prospective Designs ===
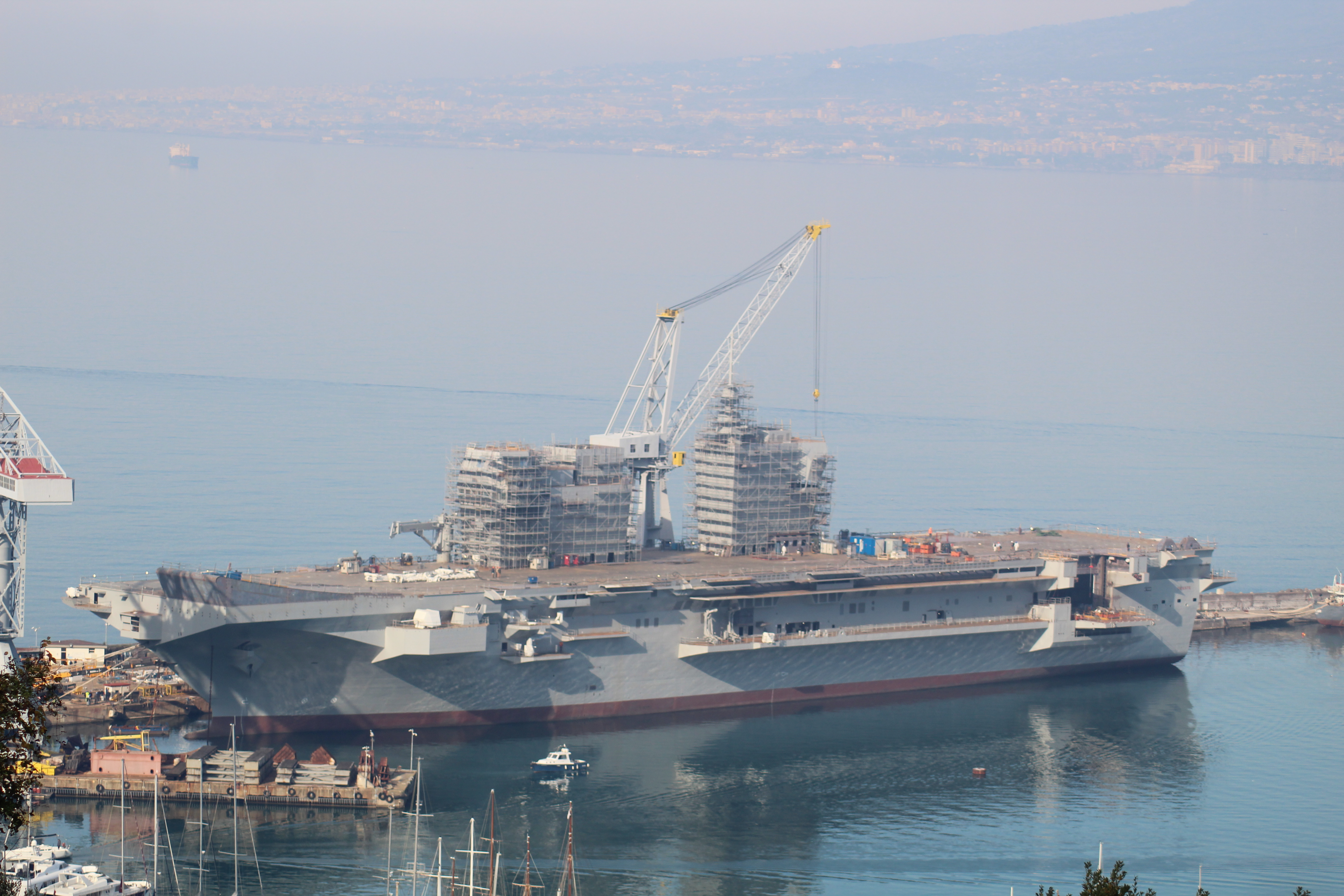
The Trieste-class landing helicopter dock, designed by Fincantieri

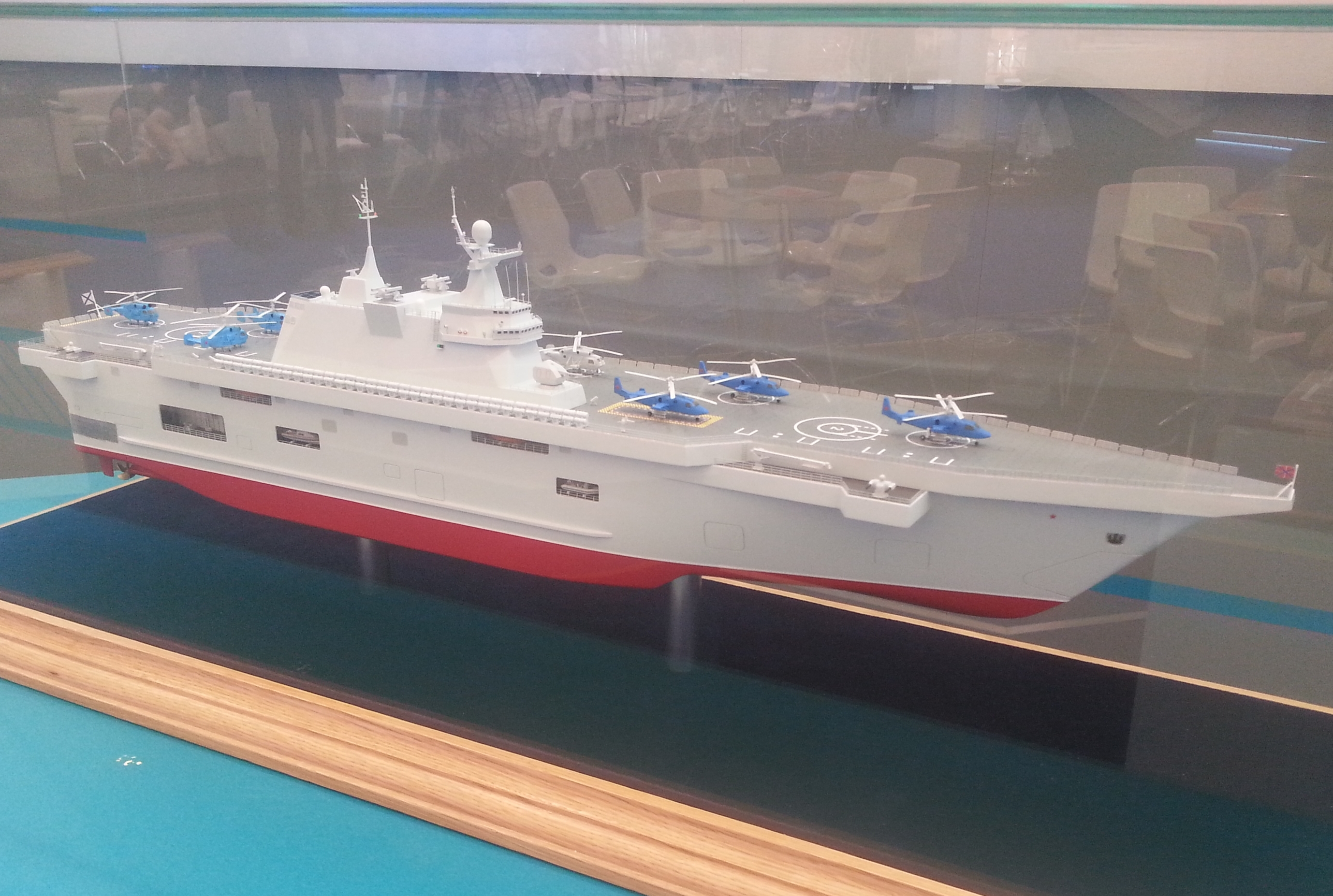
A model of the Project 23900 amphibious assault vessel, designed by JSC Zelenodolsk Design Bureau

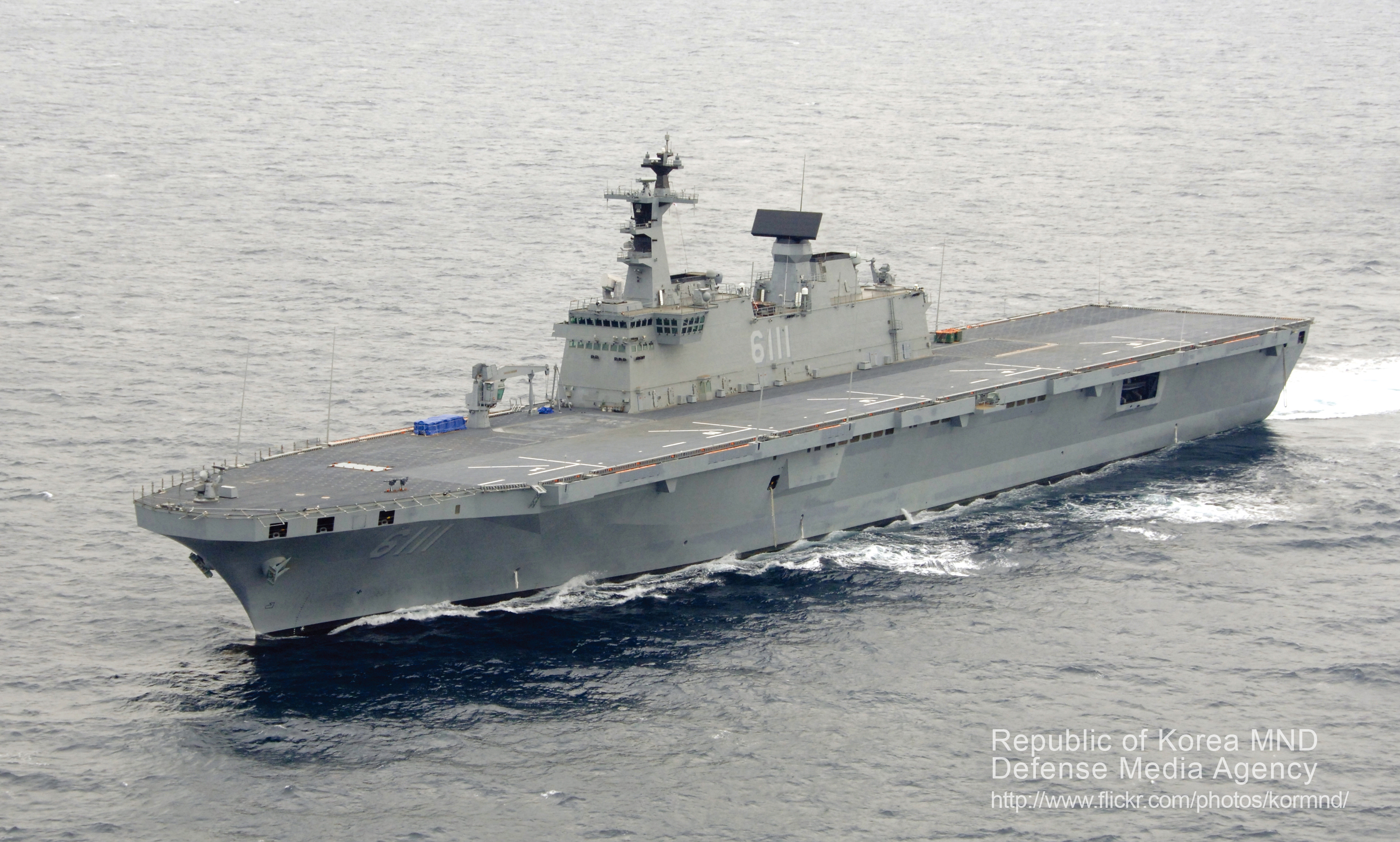
The Dokdo-class amphibious assault ship, designed by Hanjin Heavy Industries

- France :
  - May offer the Mistral-class amphibious warfare vessel.
  - Designed by Naval Group and currently operated by the French Navy and the Egyptian Navy.
  - Was previously offered to India, in joint-partnership with Pipavav Shipyard.
  - Participated with the IN in the Indo-French "VARUNA-21" joint-naval exercise.
- Spain :
  - May offer the Juan Carlos-I amphibious warfare vessels.
  - Designed by Navantia and currently operated by the Spanish Navy, with variants in Australian and Turkish service.
  - Was previously offered to India, in joint-partnership with Larsen & Toubro.
  - Variant participated with the IN in the Indo-Australian "AUSINDEX-2019" joint-naval exercise.
- Italy :
  - May offer a variant of the Trieste landing helicopter dock.
  - Designed by Fincantieri and currently operated by the Italian Navy.
- Russia :
  - May offer an export variant of Project 23900 amphibious warfare vessel.
  - Designed by JSC Zelenodolsk Design Bureau and currently being built for the Russian Navy.
- South Korea :
  - May offer the Dokdo-class amphibious warfare vessel.
  - Designed by Hanjin Heavy Industries and currently operated by the Republic of Korea Navy.
  - Reportedly offered to India, under the MRSV tender.
  - Likely won't be chosen as the Indian Navy requires a displacement of 20,000t+ per LPD, according to the AoN granted on 23 October 2025, which the Dokdo-class does not fulfill.

== See also ==
Other amphibious vessels operated by the Indian Navy

- INS Jalashwa (L41) - India's only active landing platform dock, purchased from the United States in 2007. Was previously the USS Trenton of the United States Navy.

Other references to the Indian Navy

- List of active Indian Navy ships
- Future of the Indian Navy
