= Multi-role support ship =

Multi-role support ship or multi-role support vessel may refer to:

- Multi-role support ship (Malaysia)
- Multi-role support ships in the Indian Navy amphibious vessel acquisition project
