= Samarthak-class multi purpose vessel =

Multi Purpose Vessel for the Indian Navy

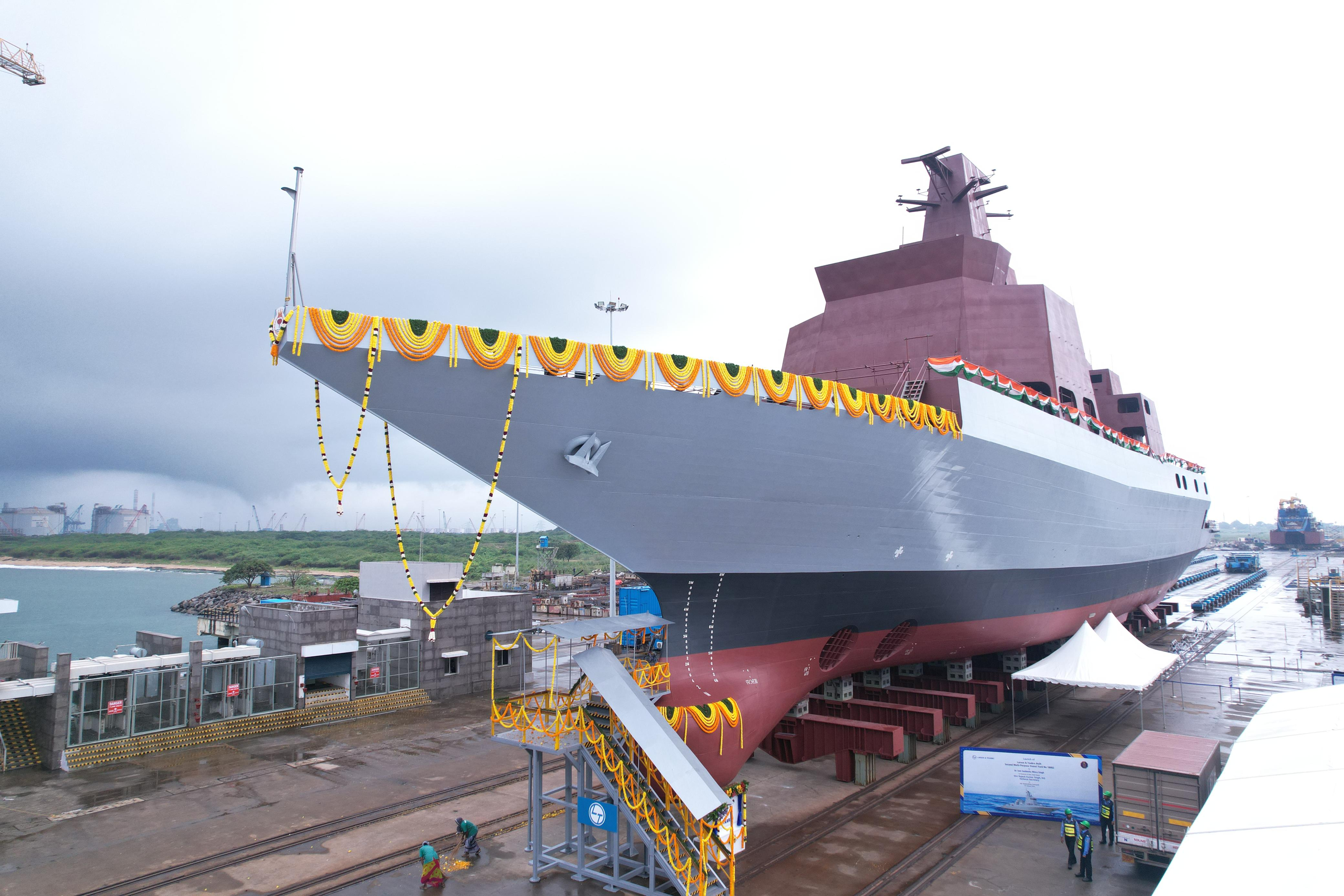
- L&T Multi Purpose Vessel

Class overview
- Name: Samarthak Class
- Builders: Larsen & Toubro
- Operators: Indian Navy
- Cost: ₹887 crore (equivalent to ₹10 billion or US$110 million in 2026) for two (FY 2022)
- Planned: 2
- Building: 1
- Completed: 1
- Active: 1

General characteristics
- Type: Multi-purpose vessel
- Displacement: 3,750 t (3,690 long tons; 4,130 short tons)
- Length: 107 m (351 ft 1 in)
- Beam: 18.6 m (61 ft 0 in)
- Propulsion: CODAD: 2 × Cummins QSK95 Diesel Engine
- Speed: 15 kn (28 km/h; 17 mph)
- Range: 4,500 nmi (8,300 km; 5,200 mi)
- Crew: 116 including 08 officers
- Sensors & processing systems: Navigation radar; LINK II tactical datalink and satellite communication (SATCOM) to Rukmani; Surface search radar
- Electronic warfare & decoys: SANKET MkIII; Kavach (anti-missile system)
- Armament: 1 × Oto Melara 76 mm naval gun; 2 × CRN-91 30mm autocannon; 2 × SRCG gun (12.7 mm); 1 × 533 mm twin torpedo launcher Varunastra (torpedo); 1 × 324 mm triple torpedo launcher Torpedo Advanced Light Shyena; 1 × RBU-6000 anti-submarine rocket launcher
- Aviation facilities: 1 × HAL Dhruv Mk.III

Samarthak-class multi-purpose vessels are a series of ships being built by Larsen & Toubro at the Kattupalli Shipyard near Chennai for the Indian Navy. The vessels are supposed to provide a cost-effective solution to meet a variety of requirements of Indian Navy.

== History ==
On 25 March 2022, the Ministry of Defence signed a contract with Larsen & Toubro for the acquisition of two multi-purpose vessels (MPVs) at a cost of ₹887 crore (US$112.84 million). The vessels would be constructed at the L&T's Kattupalli Shipyard near Chennai and the deliveries were scheduled from May 2025.

The keel-laying ceremony for the ships, named Samarthak (lit. 'The Proponent') and Utkarsh, occurred on March 20, 2023, at L&T's Kattupalli Shipyard near Chennai.

While Samarthak was delivered to the Indian Navy on 27 August 2026, Utkarsh was already launched and undergoing sea trials ahead of her handover. Samarthak is scheduled to be commissioned on 16 October with her motto, विजयार्थम् एकनिष्ठता (lit. 'Victory is Our Sole Aim').

== Role ==
Their intended primary roles include multi-role support functions such as maritime patrol and surveillance, launching and recovery of torpedoes, and operation of various types of aerial, surface and underwater targets for gunnery and ASW firing exercises.

These vessels would also be capable of towing ships and rendering humanitarian assistance and disaster relief (HADR) support with limited hospital ship capability. The ship will also act as trial platform for naval weapons and sensors under development, support platform for Immediate Support Vessels (ISVs) & salvage operations, and to provide logistics support for India island territories.

== Design ==
The project is being undertaken by L&T Precision Engineering Systems (PES) while the design and construction was entirely conducted at their Warship Design Centre and Kattupalli Shipyard, respectively. The MPV is specifically designed as a multi-role test and trials platform. The ships have an indigenous content of over 75%.

The vessel has a length of 107 metres and a displacement of 3,750 tonnes. Powered by a CODAD system with two Pielstick diesel engines, it achieves a maximum speed of 15 knots and a 4,500-nautical-mile range, ensuring endurance for extended missions. With a beam of 18.6 meters and accommodations for 116 crew members, including 8 officers, the vessel balances stability, capacity, and comfort. Its design supports diverse roles: maritime surveillance with advanced radar and LINK II datalink, target launch/recovery for gunnery and ASW training, towing operations, and unmanned vehicle deployment. Equipped with the SANKET MkIII electronic warfare system and Kavach anti-missile defense, it offers robust self-protection, while SATCOM enhances communication. The MPV also serves as a trial platform for indigenous weapons and sensors, aligning with India's “Aatmanirbhar Bharat” initiative. Beyond combat, it supports humanitarian assistance and disaster relief with limited hospital facilities and combats sea pollution, showcasing environmental responsibility. Its modular design allows adaptability, from heavy-lift operations to testing next-generation technologies. Cost-effective and multi-role, the Samarthak-class reduces reliance on specialized ships, strengthening India's naval flexibility. This vessel embodies a blend of modern engineering and strategic foresight, meeting the Indian Navy's evolving needs in surveillance, training, support, and relief operations while advancing domestic shipbuilding prowess.

== Ships of the class ==
Name	Yard No	Builder	Laid Down	Launched	Delivered	Commissioning	Status	Homeport
Samarthak	18001	Larsen & Toubro	20 March 2023	14 October 2024	27 August 2026	16 October 2026	Active	Karwar
Utkarsh	18002	Larsen & Toubro	20 March 2023	13 January 2025			Sea trials	

either scheduled or estimated dates
