= National Hospital Ship =

Planned hospital ship for the Indian Navy

Class overview
- Name: National Hospital Ship class
- Operators: India
- Cost: ₹2,000 crore (equivalent to ₹21 billion or US$250 million in 2023) per unit (FY 2022)
- Planned: 1

General characteristics
- Type: National Hospital Ship
- Displacement: 17,000 t (17,000 long tons; 19,000 short tons)
- Length: 175 m (574 ft 2 in)
- Beam: 25 m (82 ft 0 in)
- Propulsion: Twin engines
- Range: 7500 nmi
- Complement: 600 including 250 patients
- Crew: 125 including 10 officers
- Sensors & processing systems: Navigation radar
- Aircraft carried: 1 × HAL Dhruv MKiii

NHS is a planned Hospital Ship for the Indian Navy. Under this programme the Indian Navy intends to acquire one ship. Ship under this class will feature advanced medical facilities with a capacity of 250 Beds.
