= Swan Defence and Heavy Industries Limited =

Indian shipbuilding company

Coordinates: 20.922351°N 71.499571°E

- Formerly: Pipavav Shipyard Limited; Pipavav Defence and Offshore Engineering Company Limited; Reliance Defence and Engineering Limited; Reliance Naval and Engineering Limited
- Type: Public
- Traded as: BSE: 533107; NSE: SWANDEF
- Industry: FPSO; Shipbuilding; Heavy industry; Defence
- Founded: 17 October 1997; 28 years ago
- Founders: Nikhil Prataprai Gandhi; Bhavesh Prataprai Gandhi
- Headquarters: Pipavav Port, Rajula, Amreli district, Gujarat, India
- Area served: Worldwide
- Key people: Nikhil Merchant (Chairman and Managing Director)
- Services: Ships & offshore Platforms, Pressure Vessels Design, construction, repair and conversion
- Revenue: ▼₹14.13 billion (US$150 million) (2018)
- Net income: ▼₹−9.56 billion (US$−99 million) (2018)
- Total assets: ▼₹99.4 billion (US$1.0 billion) (2018)
- Number of employees: 367 (March 2018)
- Parent: Swan Corp Limited
- Website: sdhi.co.in

Swan Defence and Heavy Industries Limited formerly known as Reliance Naval and Engineering Limited, Reliance Defence & Engineering Limited and prior to that as Pipavav Shipyard Limited (PSL) and Pipavav Defence & Offshore Engineering Company Limited is an Indian shipbuilding and heavy industry company. The shipyard is located near the village of Pipavav in Gujarat, at a distance of 90 km South of Amreli, 15 km South of Rajula and 140 km South West of Bhavnagar. The company was the first private sector company in India to obtain a license and contract to build warships and owns the largest shipyard in India.

== History ==
Pipavav Shipyard Limited was the original company.It was originally built by SKIL Ports & Logistics. Pipavav Shipyard is now known as Swan Defence and Heavy Industries.

=== Joint ventures ===
On 12 September 2011, it was announced that Pipavav Shipyard entered a joint venture with Mazagon Dock Limited to collaborately build warships and submarines using Pipavav's facilities. The deal was intended to free up the congested order book of Mazagon shipyard and to give Pipavav a much needed boost in defence shipbuilding.

In February 2014, Pipavav announced a joint venture with Atlas Elektronik to build Heavy Weight Torpedoes.

=== Debt restructuring ===
On 26 March 2015, Pipavav Shipyard successfully implemented debt restructuring by raising additional debt of INR 5,500 crore resulting in total debt line in excess of INR 12,000 crore (about US$2 billion).

=== Reliance ===
17.66 per cent of Pipavav Shipyard was acquired by Reliance Infrastructure Limited on 5 March 2015 in a US$130 mln deal. Subsequently, Reliance Infrastructure launched an open offer to acquire additional shares to control 25.1 per cent of the company. After the open offer was completed, Reliance Infrastructure held 36.5% equity in Pipavav Shipyard and Anil Ambani was appointed as the chairman.

The company was renamed to Reliance Defence and Engineering on 3 March 2016 and again renamed to Reliance Naval and Engineering Limited on 6 September 2017.

In January 2020, Reliance Naval triggered a corporate insolvency process by defaulting on bank loan payments.

=== Swan Corp ===
Swan Energy, now rebranded as Swan Corp, in partnership with Hazel Mercantile Limited, acquired Reliance Naval and Engineering Limited following the approval of their corporate insolvency resolution plan by the National Company Law Tribunal on 23 December 2022, as dictated by the applicable laws. As part of the acquisition, a new board of directors was appointed on 8 December 2023, and Swan Energy's management officially took over control of the company on 4 January 2024. All actions related to the acquisition proceeded in line with the approved resolution plan.

In January 2025, the new name, Swan Defence and Heavy Industries Limited, became effective and the company relisted on the Indian stock exchanges.

On 24 September, the shipyard signed a Memorandum of Understanding (MoU) with Netherlands-based Royal IHC to collaborate on te construction of Offshore Construction Vessels. The Royal IHC's representative in India, Alar Infrastructure, is also part of the agreement which includes the design, construction and retrofitting of multiple types of ships like Offshore Construction Vessels, Pipe Laying Vessels, and Multi-Purpose Offshore Support Vessels at SDHI's infrastructure based in Pipavav Port. The shipyard features India's largest dry dock with a dimension of 662 m × 65 m along with a fabrication capacity of 144,000 tons per annum.

On 28 October, Mazagon Dock Shipbuilders (MDL) and Swan Defence and Heavy Industries Limited (SDHI) signed an Teaming Agreement (TA) to partner for the LPD project of the Indian Navy. The agreement includes both design and construction of the vessels which will be undertaken by MDL and Swan Defence, respectively.

== Ships built by the company ==
- Golden Brilliant
- Golden Bull
- Golden Suek
- Golden Diamond
- Golden Amber
- Golden Ruby

== Shipyard facilities ==
Swan Defence and Heavy Industries is home to India's largest shipyard. The shipyard is located in Port Pipavav and spreads over 600 acres (2.4 km^{2}). The shipyard has a 1.2 km sea front to support activities including activities like berthing, docking and launching of vessels.. The shipyard has the largest drydock in India. The dry dock which measures 662 meters in length and 65 meters in breadth, can accommodate ships up to 400,000 DWT. The dry dock is also home to India’s largest Goliath Crane, with a lifting capacity of 600 MT, spanning 148m and hook height of 75m. The facility also features a 100-meter extension track for the Goliath crane to unload heavy machinery and equipment directly from ships and heavy lift barges. Additionally, 2 ELLs of total 80 MT capacity add to the operational heft of the dry dock. A wet basin of 340m x 60m with 5m to 6m draft provides for berthing, assembly and launch of vessels.

The shipyard has a 1.2 km sea front to support activities including activities like berthing, docking and launching of vessels. The state-of-the-art shipyard is home to one of India's largest fabrication sites in a special economic zone (SEZ) – a dedicated 2.41 Mn sq. ft. of covered shed which allows year around fabrication.

== Achievements and orders ==
In June 2010, PSL was awarded a ₹26 billion (US$568.6 million) contract to build five offshore patrol vessels for the Indian Navy.

In July 2015, Pipavav Shipyard was chosen for a 'Make in India' naval frigate order. The order value exceeds more than US$3 bn. This order is being termed as the private sector's biggest-ever warship-building project.

On 13 February 2017, Reliance Defence and Engineering Limited signed the Master Ship Repair Agreement with the US Navy to maintain the vessels of its Seventh Fleet operating in the region, with the company estimating revenues of about Rs 15,000 crore ($2 billion) over next 3 to 5 years. The Seventh Fleet's area of responsibility included the Western Pacific and Indian Ocean and at any given time there were roughly 140 ships and submarines, 5070 aircraft and approximately 20,000 sailors under its command. Prior to this agreement, these vessels visited Singapore or Japan for such works.

As of 2024, the company has delivered five 74,500 DWT Panamax bulk carrier vessels since the start of commercial operations in June 2012.

=== 2025–present ===
On 10 November 2025, the shipyard signed a Letter of Intent (LoI) with Norway-based ship owner and operator, Rederiet Stenersen AS, to supply six IMO Type II chemical tankers. The contract will be worth $220 million. The vessels, with a 18,000 deadweight tonnage capacity, will be designed by Norway's Marinform AS & StoGda Ship Design & Engineering and classified by DNV. They will be built to Ice Class 1A standards while fitted with an advanced hybrid propulsion. They will feature a modular design to be converted into methanol or LPG carrier while the battery capacity can be enhanced to 5,000-kWh.

On 23 January 2026, the shipyard received the $227 million contract from Rederiet Stenersen AS for the six chemical tankers. This is reported to be first and largest chemical tanker order received by any shipyard in the country. The dimensions of the ships will be 150 m (490 ft) by length and approximately 23 m (75 ft) by beam. The contract also includes option agreement for six additional vessels. The first ship will be delivered within 33 months.

On 5 February 2026, the shipyard received a defence export order from the Royal Navy of Oman for a training ship. The ship, to be delivered in 18 months, will measure 104.25 m (342.0 ft) in length, 13.88 m (45.5 ft) in beam and will displace 3,500 tonnes. The ship will be equipped with state-of-the-art navigation system, communication suite, helicopter deck. The vessel will accommodate up to 70 cadets with modern classrooms and training offices.

On 7 April 2026, the shipyard received the India's first contract to supply four 92,500 DWT bulk carriers with ammonia-fuelled, dual-fuel propulsion system from Energy ONE Limited at a cost of over ₹2,600 crore (US$270 million). The vessels will measure 229.5 m (753 ft) by length and approximately 37 m (121 ft) by beam adn will be designed by South Korea's KMS-EMEC and classified by DNV. Meanwhile, Swan Defence and Heavy Industries has also partnered with Samsung Heavy Industries for two contracts from the Shipping Corporation of India. The contracts include six of the eight Very Large Gas Carriers (VLGC) with 88,000 cubic metre capacity each as well as two Medium Range Product Tanker at a cost of $200 million with two more ships in option.

In October 2026, SDHI was announced as the lowest bidder for a tender released in February by the Shipping Corporation of India (SCI) for a firm order of two dual-fuel, Medium Range Product Tanker for $200 million along with an option for two further vessels. SDHI had partnered with Samsung Heavy Industries for the programme. Other parterships included Cochin Shipyard Limited (CSL) with HD Korea Shipbuilding & Offshore Engineering, L&T Shipbuilding (Kattupalli Shipyard) with Hanwha Ocean, and a consortium of Garden Reach Shipbuilders & Engineers (GRSE) and Hindustan Shipyard Limited (HSL). The contract will be worth ₹1,897 crore (US$196 million) and awarded by an SCI-led joint venture of state shipping companies and stakeholders. The bids were opened on 9 October and Samsung Heavy Industries, the partner of SDHI, had quoted around US$48.9 million for each vessel with a cargo capacity of 17,000 to 18,000 tons. The partnership of CSL and HD Korea Shipbuilding had quoted a price of US$4 million more.

== See also ==
- List of Indian shipbuilders and shipyards
- Cochin Shipyard
- Hindustan Shipyard
- Shipbuilding
