= Kattupalli Shipyard =

Large shipyard project

Kattupalli Port
- Interactive map of Kattupalli Port

Location
- Country: India
- Coordinates: 13.312114°N 80.345598°E

Details
- Opened: January 2012
- Operated by: Adani Group
- Owned by: Adani Ports & SEZ
- Type of Harbor: Natural harbor (sea port)
- No. of berths: 4
- Depth: 14 metres (46 ft)

The Kattupalli Shipyard, officially Adani Katupalli Port Private Limited, is a large shipyard project at Kattupalli village near Ennore in Chennai district, built by L&T Shipbuilding Ltd. It is being set up jointly by TIDCO and Larsen & Toubro (L&T) in two phases. L&T shipbuilding Kattupalli is a minor port. Adani ports and special economic zone (APSEZ) acquired Kattupalli Port from L&T in June 2018 and renamed it as Adani Katupalli Port Private Limited (AKPPL).

In terms of cargo generation, the terminal is located close to the majority of Container Freight stations in Chennai. The Kattupalli development also includes a shipyard being developed by L&T, a private sector–backed development.

It is planning to compete with Japanese and Korean shipyards in building "specialised ships," such as large-size warships, car carriers, submarines, naval offshore patrol vessels, fast patrol vessels and corvettes. After Colombo and Singapore, Kattupalli will be the third major international destination for ship repairs in the region.

The shipyard-cum-minor port complex was officially inaugurated on 30 January 2013.

== Structure ==
The first development phase, which aims to be operational by January 2012, will have a 12 lakh (1.2 million) TEU capacity through two 350-metre-long L-shaped berths and a total terminal area of around 20 hectares. The berths would be operated by Philippines-based International Container Terminal Services Inc for 28 years. The terminal has an option to rise to 18 lakh (1.8 million) TEU capacity during the second phase of development.

Mobile equipment will include two reach stackers and one empty handler.

The yard will offer 5,000 ground slots and a CFS is also planned as part of the service package. Access to the terminal on the marine side is via a 3.5 km-long channel and port basin offering a draft of 14 m—the draft capability is such that it provides for projected increases in Southern Asian container trade. It also provides for the future possibility of mainline Asia–Europe vessels making a stop in Southern India, which has been mooted as a distinct possibility by certain analysts. Kattupalli's North and South breakwaters, which together total 3.35 km, ensure a safe harbour and uninterrupted terminal operations.

The yard has 3 rail-mounted quayside cranes (RMQCs) (arrived at the port in December 2011 from China), 15 rubber-tyred gantry cranes (RTGCs), two reach stackers and 420 reefer plug points. On 12 April 2012, the yard received Zhen Hua 20, a heavy lift vessel, with three more RMQCs to be installed at the second berth.

== Engineering components hub ==
When fully completed, it will be the largest shipyard in Asia. Once operational, the shipyard will become a nucleus for heavy engineering industry (fabrications and components manufacturing). This would make Chennai a hub for engineering components. The project is being implemented in two phases with a total investment of about ₹4,675 crore. ₹3,050 crore will be invested in Phase I (2009–11), and the rest in Phase II (2012–15). MoU has been signed and the project has commenced.

== Rail corridor ==
As of October 2019, a 6.08 km rail corridor to ferry cargo to the port is being built at a cost of ₹51.8 crore on a 31.175-hectare (77.04-acre) area.

== Proposed facilities ==
The Kattupalli yard is mainly built for making warships and to augment the existing capacity at Hazira in Gujarat for submarines. A draft of up to 14 m and a waterfront exceeding 2.2 km makes the facility well suited to building large defence ships.

The Integrated shipyard complex will have the following facilities:

1. Commercial ship building including very large cargo carriers; specialised cargo ships for liquid/gas transportation and cruise vessels
2. Building of defense ships including submarines
3. Off-shore platforms and floating production-cum-storage facility for oil and gas sector
4. Refitting and re-engineering of commercial and defence ships
5. Heavy engineering fabrication and components production for ship building.

At the yard, encompassing 1,250 acres, L&T has also commissioned facilities to build offshore platforms, drilling rigs and FPSOs (floating production, storage and offloading unit), besides a minor port which can handle container ships. An 18,000-tonne shiplift is being installed at the yard.

In the first phase, around ₹4,000 crore is being invested in the facility that will start rolling out ships by January 2012.

== Project status ==
7 August 2009

- L&T scales down investment in the first phase to ₹15,000 million (equivalent to ₹41 billion or US$440 million in 2026). Total investment in both phases of the project is ₹5,000 crore (equivalent to ₹140 billion or US$1.5 billion in 2026).

26 April 2010

- L&T arranges funds for Kattupalli project. The shipbuilding facility, billed as India's biggest, has got environmental clearance from the Government of India. The Tamil Nadu Government has allocated land for the shipyard complex.

14 Sep 2010

- India's biggest engineering and construction firm, L&T, will open a container terminal by January 2012 at Kattupalli, where it is also building a shipyard.

26 Sep 2010

- Engineering major L&T's shipping arm, L&T Shipbuilding Ltd (LTSB), has earmarked around ₹1,500 crore to develop around 800 acres of land at Kattupalli for expanding its vessel building capacity, a top company official said.

06 Apr 2011

- International Container Terminal Services Inc (ICTSI) said it has signed the contract with India's L&T Shipbuilding Ltd. for the container port operations for the Kattupalli Container Terminal in Tamil Nadu, India.

08 Jun 2011

- ICTSI has forged a deal with LTSB for the management and operation of the Kattupalli International Container Terminal (KICT) for a 28-year period – a term that is exceptionally long for this type of arrangement and which represents something of a first in the industry.

25 Jul 2011

- L&T Shipbuilding Ltd is likely to form a joint venture with Ennore Port Ltd and the Tamilnadu Industrial Development Corporation (TIDCO), to build a 25.5 km road that would connect Ennore Port and Kattupalli Port. The road project is estimated to cost ₹360 crore.

Jun 2015

- L&T Shipbuilding at Kattupalli is fully functional.

Construction of New Build Projects: In 2015 L&T has bagged order for construction of 7 Offshore patrol vessels for the Indian Coast Guard and Floating Dock for the Indian Navy which will be designed in house at L&T Ship Design Centre. At commercial new build front L&T Shipbuilding is currently executing eight offshore vessels at Kattupalli Yard for Overseas Client. Presently, L&T is executing a project for construction of 54 Interceptor Boats for the Indian Coast Guard. Designed in-house with waterjet propulsion and aluminium hull, these boats have a speed of over 45 knots and excellent manoeuvrability.

Design Centre: L&T Shipbuilding has a design centre with capability of in-house designing of Naval ships and submarines and has already developed basic designs of Interceptor Boats, Offshore Patrol Vessels, Corvettes etc. which can be adapted to customer requirements. 3D Modelling integrated with Product Lifecycle Management and other Design and Analysis software suites enable accuracy, revision control and output aligned with yard infrastructure.

Ship Repairs, Refits & Conversions: L&T Shipbuilding is geared to handle ship repairs, refits and conversions catering to commercial and Defence ships/submarines and offshore platforms. A shiplift of 200m x 46m with lifting capacity of 21,050 tonnes (future extension planned for larger vessels) along with transfer system and dry berths enables quick turnaround of ships. There are 4 wet berths of 260 / 200 metres length. Many refit projects have been successfully completed.

In 2009, the facility also received Environment Clearance and Coastal Regulation Zone clearance for the annual production of 50,000 tonnes per annum for modular fabrication facility (MFF) as well as approval for 25 ship buildings and 60 ship repairs. However, as reported in July 2025, the existing infrastructure supports an annual capacity of 30 ship repairs and 15 ship building. Hence, L&T is expected to invest an additional ₹1,000 crore (equivalent to ₹10 billion or US$110 million in 2026) into the shipyard. The new infrastructure will allow the shipyard to operate at full capacity as cleared in 2009. This development will be undertaken on a land of 892.11 acres (3.6102 km^{2}) owned by L&T. The project involves establishing additional shops, fabrication units, paint shops, assembly shops, blasting shops, residential accommodation buildings, office buildings, warehouse sheds, skill development centre, landscaping/greenbelt development. The development work is expected to begin in October 2025 and will take three years to complete.

== L&T Shipbuilding ==
=== Construction ===
- Arihant-class submarine (assistance in design and construction)
- P-75I submarine project (partnered with Navantia for construction of S-80 Plus-class submarines for the Indian Navy; design was disqualified later)
- Samarthak-class multi purpose vessel
- L&T-class Cadet Training Ship
- L&T-class fast interceptor craft
- HSL-class fleet support ship
- 5 × High-speed boats (Vietnam)

=== Repair and refits ===
==== Indian Navy ====
In December 2015, L&T was chosen by the Russian shipbuilder Sevmash to be its Indian partner in the second refit project of the Sindhughosh-class submarines. While the first of the four Kilo class subs will go to the Russian Zvezdochka shipyard for inspection and refit, the remaining three are to be modernized at the Kattupalli shipyard. The first of the submarines to be modernized at private yard, a first for India, will go in by 2017. In an official letter to the Indian Government, the Russian shipyard has put forward its willingness to work alongside L&T. L&T will play a major role in a planned ₹5,000 crore (equivalent to ₹82 billion or US$880 million in 2026) Kilo-class submarine modernisation plan of the Indian Navy. The shipyard was nominated after it was the only found to be the technically capable facility after a survey of the equipment profile and finances of Cochin Shipyard and Pipavav Shipyard.

==== U.S. Navy ====
On 7 August 2022, the United States Navy sent its first ship, USNS Charles Drew (T-AKE-10), to Kattupalli Shipyard of Larsen & Toubro for an 11-day repair and allied services work. The repair work was completed on 17 August 2022. This was a result of the U.S.-India 2+2 Ministerial Dialogue in April 2022 where US was represented by Secretary of Defense Lloyd Austin and U.S. Secretary of State Antony Blinken.

The second ship, USNS Matthew Perry (T-AKE-9), underwent repair and upgrades from 11 to 27 March 2023. After the refit, the ship returned to the Indo-Pacific theatre for operations.

On 9 July 2023, the third ship, USNS Salvor (T-ARS 52), reached Kattupalli Shipyard for "Voyage Repairs". The time period for the repair is two weeks after which it will again return in November for a 90 day comprehensive repair.

On 10 July 2023, the US Navy signed a Master Ship Repair Agreement (MSRA) with Larsen & Toubro for US Navy's Military Sealift Command Fleet Support Ships for a period of 5 years. The shipyard has qualified for such repair works by the Indian Navy and Coast Guard as well. This was recorded as a direct outcome of the 2022 U.S.-India 2+2 Ministerial Dialogue. The MSRA is a ‘legally non-binding arrangement’ between the US Navy and private shipbuilding contractors to pre-approve shipyards to repair US naval vessels, according to a report. The ships operated by MSC are non-commissioned US Navy “support vessels” with civilian crews bearing the prefix “USNS”. Under the agreement, the US Naval ships of Seventh Fleet or the Indo-Pacific Command that are in voyage are to be repaired in India.

On 20 November 2026, USNS Wally Schirra (T-AKE-8) arrived at Kattupalli Shipyard for repair works. This was the fifth instance of a US Navy ship arriving at the facility for repair after Charles Drew revisited the site in December 2024 and the first instance following the implementation of a revised SOP under MSRA.

==== Royal Navy ====
In March 2024, maintenance of RFA Argus and RFA Lyme Bay was undertaken at the Kattupalli Shipyard in India. This was the first time that a Royal Navy ship has arrived in an Indian shipyard for maintenance. The ships, escorted by HMS Diamond, had transited through the Red Sea to reach India. Later, in April 2024, LRG(S) participated in Maritime Partnership Exercise with Indian Navy's Eastern Fleet in the Indian Ocean, including stealth frigate INS Sahyadri.

=== Maersk ===
Maersk signed an agreement with Larsen & Toubro for the former's first drydocking in India. Under the agreement, Maersk Chattogram, a Singapore-flagged container ship, entered Kattupalli Shipyard on 20 October 2026 for the vessel's normal lifecycle and will include its scheduled special survey, along with maintenance and overhaul work covering the hull and structure, machinery, equipment and propulsion systems. Maersk and L&T had signed memorandum of understanding during India Maritime Week 2025.

== See also ==
- Chennai Port
- Ennore Port
- Ports in India
