= Shachi-class offshore patrol vessel (2017) =

Cancelled Indian patrol vessel class

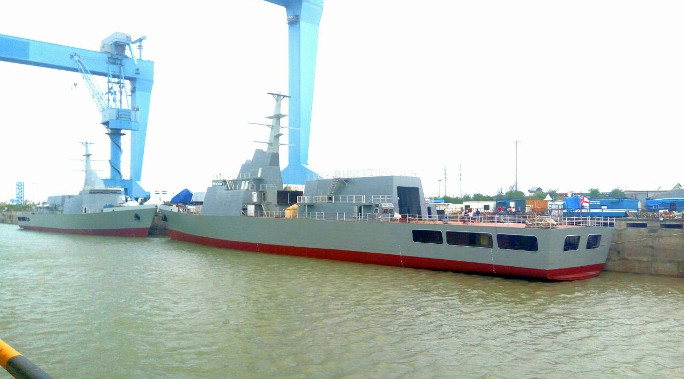
- ex- Shachi and Shruti

Class overview
- Name: Shachi class
- Builders: Pipavav Shipyard
- Operators: Indian Navy
- Preceded by: Saryu class
- Succeeded by: Shachi class (2026)
- Planned: 5
- Cancelled: 5

General characteristics
- Type: Offshore patrol vessel
- Displacement: 1,500 t (1,500 long tons)
- Length: 105 m (344 ft)
- Propulsion: 2 × 18,200 kW (24,400 hp) diesel engines
- Speed: 25 kn (46 km/h)
- Range: 6,000 nmi (11,000 km) at 16 kn (30 km/h)
- Armament: 1 × 76 mm Oto melara gun with FCS; 2 x 30mm AK-630 CIWS

The Shachi class (Project 21) was a class of naval offshore patrol vessels supposed to be built by Reliance Defence and Engineering (formerly known as Pipavav Defence and Offshore Engineering Company Limited) at its shipyard in Indian state of Gujarat. The project was scrapped by Ministry of Defense, India after an inordinate delay of nine years. The class was succeeded in its role by the NGOPV programme, which resulted in a new Shachi class.

== Development ==
In June 2010, it was reported that Pipavav Shipyard won a contract from the Indian Ministry of Defence to build five naval offshore patrol vessels for the Indian Navy. On 27 May 2011, the contract worth ₹2,974.58 crore (equivalent to ₹61 billion or US$640 million in 2023) was signed with the delivery of the first ship scheduled for November 2014 and the remaining ships in intervals of six months each.

Initially, the vessels were planned to be built to a design sourced from Severnoye Design Bureau. They were planned to be 110 metres (360 ft) long with a displacement of 2,000 tonnes (2,000 long tons) and a top speed of 37 km/h (20 knots). However, talks with Severnoye broke down over differences in pricing and a new design partner, reported to be Alion Science, was chosen. In DEFEXPO 2014, Pipavav shipyard released a new design for the class with a lower displacement of 1,500 tonnes (1,500 long tons) but a higher top speed of 46 km/h (25 knots).

There have been numerous delays in the project, initially due to change of design partner and subsequently due to financial issues of the shipyard and acquisition of Pipavav Shipyard by Reliance. In June 2016, it was reported that the shipyard is accelerating work on the delayed order with a shorter delivery schedule for the last three ships. As of March 2018, the ships are scheduled for delivery between June 2018 and June 2020. Pipavav might be asked to pay liquidated damages of up to ₹125 crore (US$13 million) for the delayed delivery. In December 2018, it was reported that bank guarantees of over ₹100 crore (US$10 million) had been encashed by the Indian Navy.

In October 2020, the Indian Navy cancelled the deal to acquire offshore petrol vessels due to 10 year delay in their delivery and the heavy indebtedness of the contractor.

== Ships of the class ==
Two ships of the first batch, Shachi and Shruti, were launched on 25 July 2017.

Yard No.	Name	Pennant number	Builder	Launched	Sea trials	Commissioned	Homeport	Status
NS001	Shachi		RDEL	25 July 2017				Cancelled
NS002	Shruti		RDEL	25 July 2017				Cancelled
