= Cochin Shipyard =

Shipbuilding and repair facility in India

Cochin Shipyard Limited

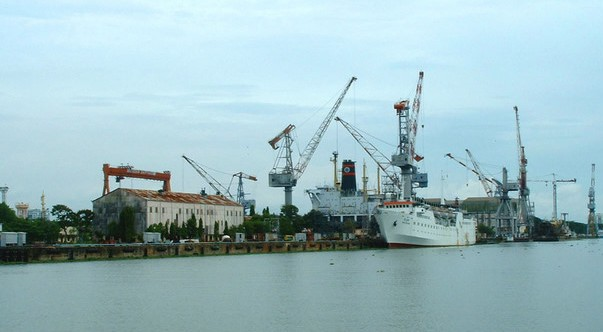
- A view of one of the docks at the Cochin Shipyard
- Type: Public
- Traded as: BSE: 540678; NSE: COCHINSHIP
- Industry: Shipbuilding
- Founded: 29 April 1972; 54 years ago
- Headquarters: Kochi, Kerala, India
- Area served: India
- Key people: Madhu S. Nair (Chairman & MD)
- Products: Aircraft carriers; ASWSWCs; Tankers; Bulk carriers; Platform supply vessels; Patrol boats; Diving support vessels; Electric boats; Ferrys; Tugboats
- Services: Ship design; Shipbuilding; Ship repair; Marine Engineering Training Institute - Vigyana Sagar
- Revenue: ▼₹2,536.94 crore (US$270 million) (FY 2023)
- Operating income: ▼₹448.50 crore (US$48 million) (FY 2023)
- Net income: ▼₹334.8 crore (US$36 million) (FY 2023)
- Total assets: ▲₹9,909.04 crore (US$1.1 billion) (FY 2023)
- Total equity: ▲₹4,423.41 crore (US$470 million) (FY 2023)
- Owner: Government of India
- Number of employees: 1,744 (March 2019)
- Subsidiaries: Hooghly Cochin Shipyard Limited; Udupi Cochin Shipyrard Limited
- Website: cochinshipyard.in

Cochin Shipyard Ltd (CSL) is a public shipbuilding and repair yard owned by the Government of India. It is located in Kochi, Kerala.

The company has Miniratna status. The shipyard builds platform supply vessels and double-hulled oil tankers. It has built big vessels up to 1,20,000 deadweight tonnage (DWT) capacity. The Indian aircraft carrier INS Vikrant was build at the yard.

== History ==
Cochin Shipyard was incorporated in 1972 as a Government of India company, with the first phase of facilities coming online in 1982.

In August 2012, the Government of India announced plans of divestment to raise capital of ₹1,500 crore for further expansion through an initial public offering (IPO) towards the end of the fiscal year. The Government finalised the decision of stake sale on 18 November 2015. 3.39 crore (33.9 million) shares were planned to be sold, out of which the government held 1,13,000 shares while the others were fresh equity. However, this did not materialise until August 2017, when the company conducted its IPO and listed its shares on the BSE and NSE. The company acqiured Tebma shipyards in 2021.

On 24 September 2026, Cochin Shipyard acquired a 23% stake in Conoship International Holding B.V. (Conoship), a Netherlands-based ship design and engineering company, through a Share Purchase Agreement (SPA) and a Shareholders’ and Cooperation Agreement for a cost of €2.3 million (₹25 crore). The approval for the purchase was approved by the CSL Board in January 2026.

== Activities ==
The yard has facilities to build vessels up to 1,10,000 deadweight tonnage (DWT) and repair vessels up to 1,25,000 DWT.

=== Shipbuilding ===
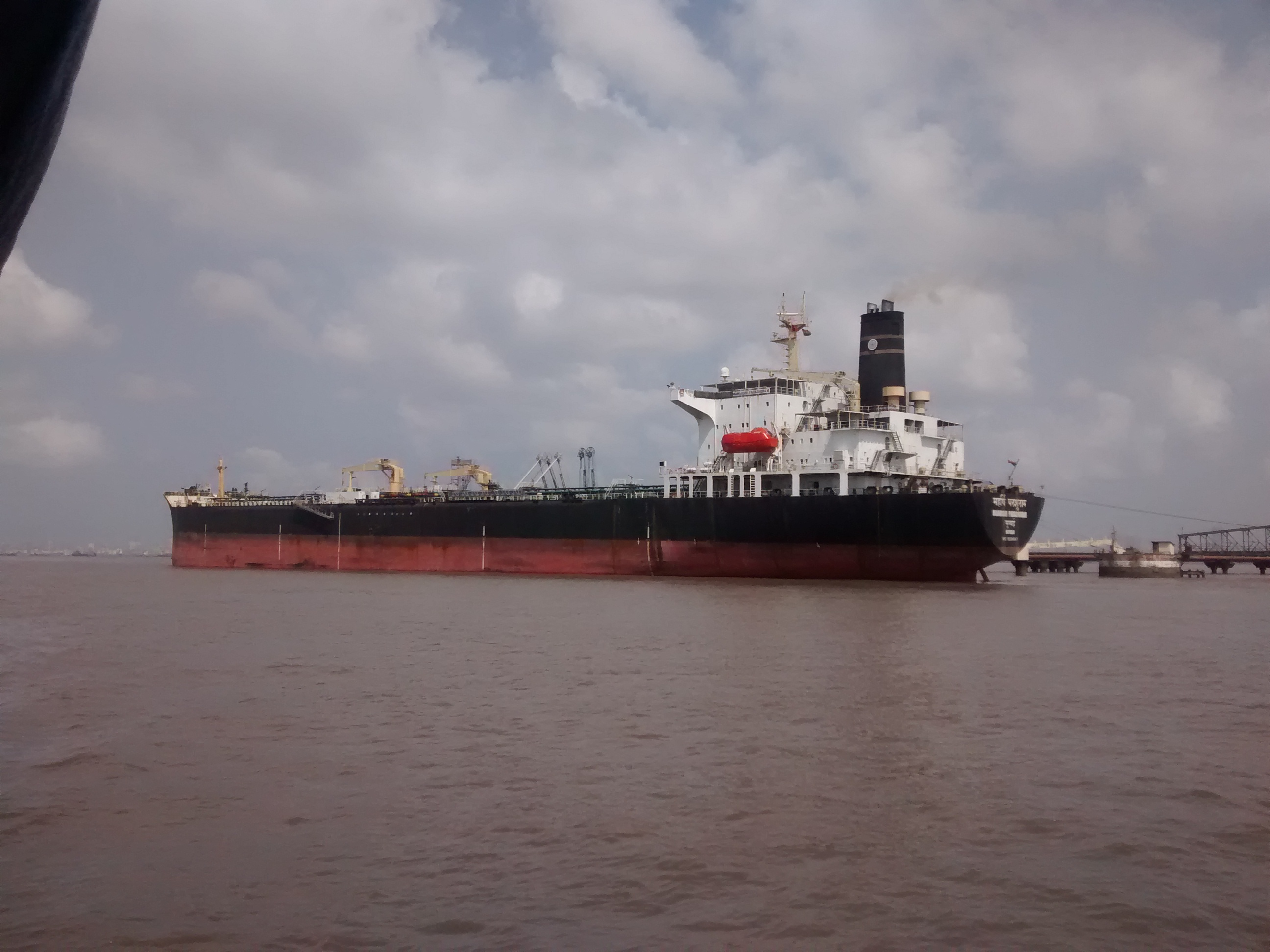
Maharishi Parshuram built in 2002 by Cochin Shipyard for SCI

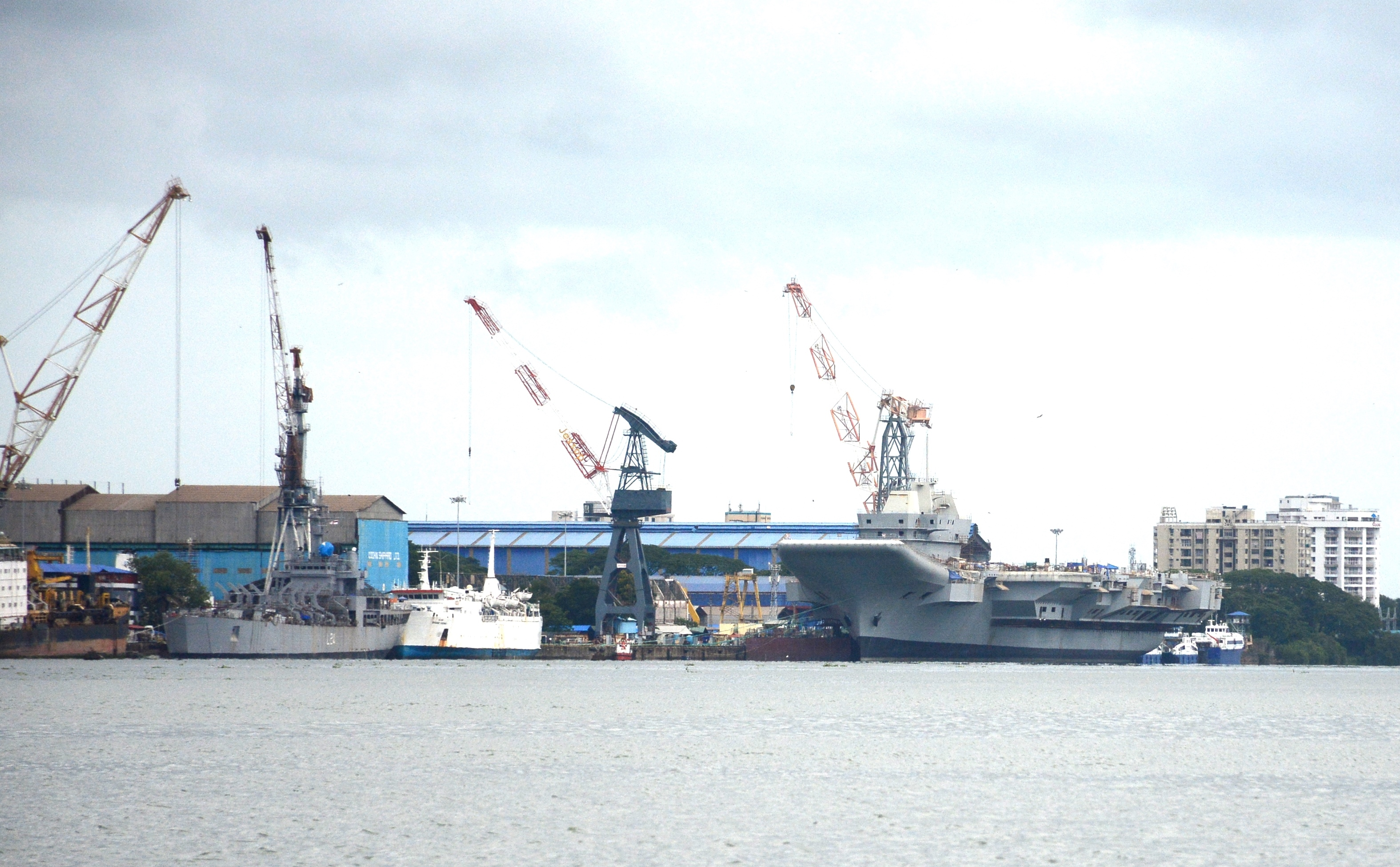
INS Vikrant being built at Cochin Shipyard in 2017

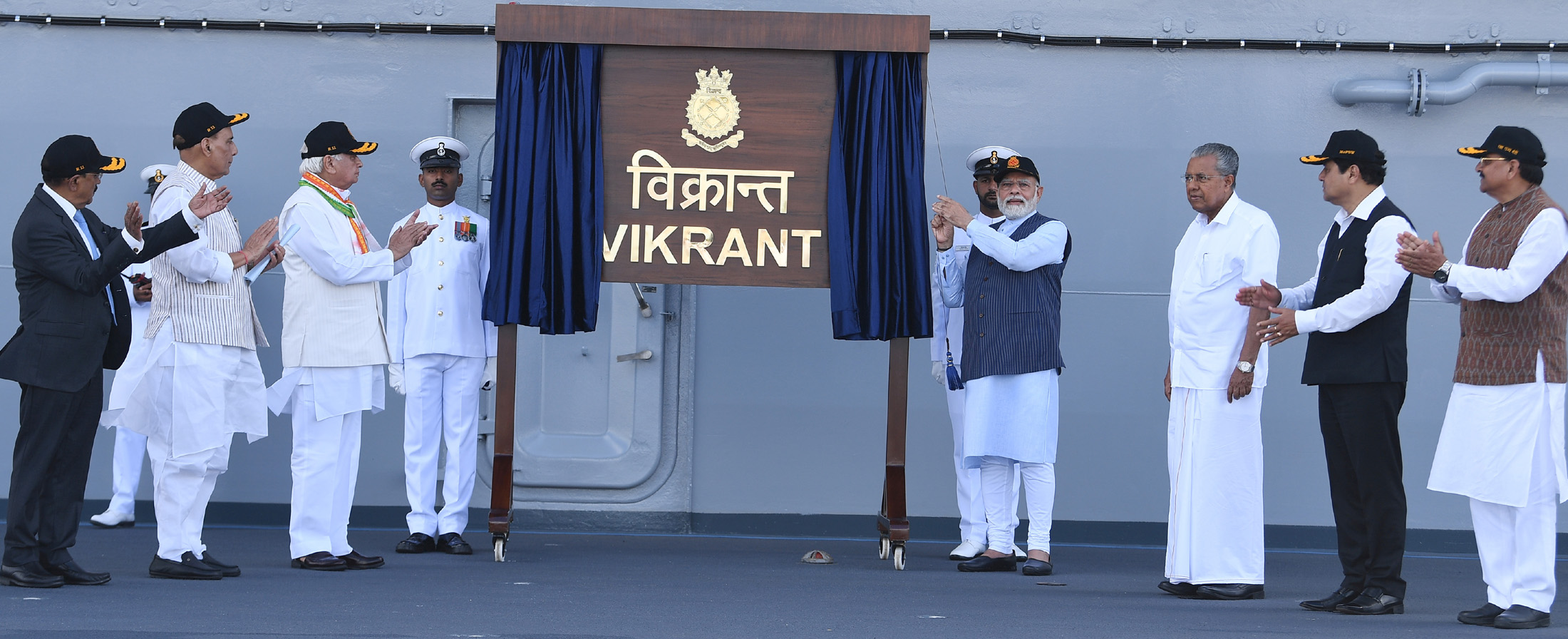
Prime Minister Narendra Modi commissioned INS Vikrant on September 2, 2022, in Kochi, Kerala.

The first ship to roll out of the Cochin Shipyard was the MV Rani Padmini in 1981.

The yard has delivered two of India's largest double-hull Aframax tankers, each of 95,000 DWT, including Maharshi Parashuram and Abul Kalam Azad to the Shipping Corporation of India.

CSL has secured shipbuilding orders from internationally renowned companies from Europe and West Asia. The shipyard is building six 30,000-tonne deadweight (DWT) bulk carriers for Clipper Group of the Bahamas and the first three vessels have been launched. Eight platform supply vessels for the Norwegian Seatankers Management Company, are also under construction..

CSL has also built the fleet of ferry boats used by the Kochi Water Metro, in association with Siemens India and Echandia.

The shipyard commissioned 310 m (1,020 ft)-long dry dock, capable of accommodating six large vessels annually up to a length of 300 m (980 ft), in January 2024. The dry dock can handle Suezmax tankers, container ships and Capesize bulk carriers.

On 27 December 2024, Adani Ports and SEZ, through its subsidiary, Ocean Sparkle Limited, ordered eight tug boats from CSL. The order is worth about ₹450 crores comprising eight 70 T Bollard Pull Azimuthing Stern Drive Tugs delivered by Udupi Cochin Shipyard Limited. Deliveries will start in December 2026 and are expected to be completed by August 2028.

As of 30 June 2025, CSL has an order book of ₹21,100 crore (equivalent to ₹220 billion or US$2.3 billion in 2026) of which 66% is from the Indian Navy. The share is down from 88%.

On 12 January 2026, the shipyard delivered the first of eight 7,000-tonne deadweight (DWT) multi-purpose vessel, HS Heinz, to Germany-based shipping company HS Schiffahrts. The vessels are part of the HS EcoFreighter ice-class series and are worth ₹110 crore (US$12 million) each. The constructions began in March 2023 with the steel-cutting ceremony of the first vessel. The vessels, designed by Netherlands-based Groot Ship Design and following DNV classification rules, are meant to carry project and heavy cargo, steel coils, containers, timber, paper, dry bulk commodities such as coal and grain, as well as hazardous materials. The vessel has a single large cargo hold with six movable partitions for reconfiguration based on the cargo to be transported. It also features a tween deck arrangement. The second ship, MS Maria, was delivered on 12 August 2026.

In February 2026, the shipyard has submitted a bid to a tender floated by the Shipping Corporation of India (SCI) for a firm order of 2 dual-fuel, Medium Range Product Tanker for $200 million along with an option for two further vessels. the Udupi division of the company also won a tender from the Adani group for the construction of four ASD tugboats with 70-tonne bollard pull power each. They will be delivered from November 2028 to February 2029.

On 18 February, CSL received a contract from France-based CMA CGM to deliver six LNG-powered, feeder container ships, each having a capacity to carry 1,700 twenty-foot equivalent units (TEUs) — at a cost of around ₹3,267 crore ($360 million). The first two vessels would be delivered within 36 months, by February 2026, followed by a delivery rate of two vessels a year. The ships will be designed by Korea Maritime Consultants (KOMAC).

As of 24 February, CSL is in an advanced negotiation with the HD Hyundai Group, which operates the HD Korea Shipbuilding to establish a 50-50 shipbuilding joint venture worth $500 million in Kochi. A CSL delegation will visit South Korea to finalise the discussions in February. An HD Hyundai delegation has already completed site inspection and evaluation in Kochi. The agreement is expected in the second half of 2026 with an initial investment of above ₹45,000 crore (US$4.8 billion) to construct a ship block fabrication facility on an 80 acres (320,000 m^{2}) leased to CSL by Cochin Port Trust with an annual output of 120,000 metric tonnes. The venture will combine the design expertise, advanced production systems and global order access of HD Hyundai with the infrastructure of CSL. The venture will produce cargo ships, container vessels, tankers, dry bulk carriers, medium range (MR) tankers, Panamax vessels and multipurpose ships. The initial blueprints, however, excludes Very Large Crude Carriers (VLCCs) due to infrastructure limitations which can be added later with capacity expansion. The shipyards had signed a memorandum of understanding (MoU) on 23 September 2025 for a long-term strategic collaboration in shipbuilding.

On 2 September 2026, CSL commenced the construction of four battery-electric TRAnsverse 2600e harbour tugs for Svitzer with a formal steel-cutting ceremony. The agreement for at least four tugs was signed in December 2025.

On 27 October, Udupi Cochin Shipyard Limited (UCSL) launched the first of eight 6,300-tonne deadweight (DWT) dry cargo vessels for Norway-based Wilson ASA. The ship, christened Wilson Energy I, was built at yard number UY-175. The eight-ship order had been placed in June 2024, at a unit cost of EUR15 million, with the first delivery due in December and the rest to be delivered by monsoon of 2028. Further, the keel laying and steel cutting of the third and the fourth ship was conducted on the same day. The vessels have a length of 99 m (325 ft), beam of 15.85 m (52.0 ft), a cargo volume of 316,278 cubic feet (8,956.0 m^{3}) and a diesel-electric propulsion for higher fuel efficiency and lower emissions. These will be the largest ships to be built by UCSL till date since its establishment in 2021. The ship was built as a whole but was partially dismantled to move to the launching site since the yard was designed to build ships with length of up to 80–90 m (260–300 ft). This was the first instance of following such unconventional launching procedure in India. The ship weighed 2,000 tonnes at launch. An earlier batch of six ships with a 3,800 tonnes deadweight (DWT) and 89 metres (292 ft) length were delivered to Wilson ASA from April 2025 within 14 months.

=== Naval ships ===
==== INS Vikrant ====
Cochin Shipyard built India's first indigenous aircraft carrier-INS Vikrant (formerly, the Project 71 "Air Defence Ship"). The carrier is the largest warship built by CSL. In February 2020, all major structural and outfitting work was declared complete. Sea trials finally began on 4 August. Five day long sea trials were successfully completed on 8 August 2021. The ship was commissioned on 2 September 2022.

==== INS Anvesh ====
CSL, in collaboration with DRDO built INS Anvesh, a missile range instrumentation ship to be used as a Floating Test Range for India's ballistic missile defence program. Its construction was awarded to CSL in 2015 and was laid down by 2016. It was commissioned into Naval service on 11 March 2022.

==== Mahe-class corvette ====
CSL and GRSE are building the ships of the ASW-SWC class for the Indian Navy. The ships built at Kochi by CSL are called Mahe class and those built by GRSE are called Arnala Class.On 30 April 2019, the MoD and CSL signed the contract, valued at ₹6,311 crore for the construction of eight ships within a deadline of 84 months. On 1 December 2020, CSL initiated the project's construction, with the steel-cutting of the first ASW-SWC vessel, the INS Mahe.

==== Aadesh-class patrol vessel ====
CSL has built 20 FPVs for the Indian Coast Guard.The ships have been designed by M/s Smart Engineering & Design Solutions (SEDS) in Kochi.

==== Next Generation Missile Vessels ====
On 30 March 2023, The ministry of defence authorised acquisition of six NGMV from CSL at a cost of ₹9,805 crore (US$1.2 billion).On 16 December 2024, the steel cutting ceremony for the first ship of NGMV held at the Cochin Shipyard.The delivery of ships is scheduled to commence from March 2027.

=== Ship repair ===
The shipyard started offering repair services in 1982 and has undertaken upgrades and repairs for all types of ships, including ships for the oil exploration industry, as well as scheduled maintenance and life extension for ships of the Indian Navy, Indian Coast Guard, the Union territory of Lakshadweep, Fisheries and Cochin Port Trust, SCI and the Oil and Natural Gas Corporation (ONGC). It has performed major overhauls for the aircraft carrier INS Viraat.

CSL was awarded major maintenance and upgrade orders from ONGC. This included major overhaul of three rigs, the mobile offshore drilling unit (MODU) Sagar Vijay, mobile offshore drilling unit Sagar Bhushan and jackup rig Sagar Kiran in 2005–06.

It performed major overhauls for the aircraft carrier INS Vikramaditya in 2016 and 2024.

On 5 April 2024, CSL became the third Indian shipyard after Kattupalli Shipyard of Larsen & Toubro and Mazagon Dock Shipbuilders to sign a Master Ship Repair Agreement (MSRA) with the United States Navy for repair of its Military Sealift Command Fleet Support Ships. The ships operated by MSC are non-commissioned US Navy "support vessels" with civilian crews bearing the prefix "USNS". Under the agreement, the US Naval ships of the Central Command that are in voyage are to be repaired in India.

=== Others ===
The shipyard also trains graduate engineers in marine engineering. Around one hundred students are trained each year.

== See also ==
- Hindustan Shipyard
- Swan Defence and Heavy Industries Limited
- Garden Reach Shipbuilders & Engineers
