= ABG-class training ship =

Cadet training ships being built for the Indian Navy

Class overview
- Builders: ABG Shipyard
- Operators: Indian Navy
- Preceded by: Tir class; INS Krishna
- Succeeded by: n/a
- Planned: 3
- Building: 3

General characteristics (planned)
- Type: Training ship
- Tonnage: 4,000 tonnes (3,900 long tons; 4,400 short tons)
- Length: 110.5 metres (363 ft)
- Beam: 17 metres (56 ft)
- Draught: 4 metres (13 ft)
- Speed: 20 knots
- Capacity: 412

The ABG class of cadet training ships is a series of three vessels being built by the ABG Shipyard in Gujarat for the Indian Navy.

== Description ==
The proposed 110-metre-long (360 ft) cadet training ships will have displacement of 4,000 tonnes each and will feature high-efficiency controllable-pitch propellers (CPP) powered by two diesel engines through a twin shaft. They will also have capability to carry light helicopters. ABG Shipyard have engaged Axsys Technologies Limited for a complete design including both basic and detailed for the ship. The ships will be providing basic training to the naval cadets and trainees to carryout disaster relief, search and rescue operations. OSI Maritime Systems will supply the Integrated Navigation and Tactical Systems (INTS) for the ships.

== Orders ==
The ABG shipyard received the first order for two ships from the Ministry of Defence in June 2011 valued at Rs 9.7 billion (US$213.58 million), which stipulates the delivery of the first ship in 42 months and the second, six months later. Thereafter the cutting of steel for the first of the two naval cadet training ships contracted took place in the first week of February 2012. The ships are meant to replace the ageing INS Tir, the lead ship of the Southern Naval Command-based First Training Squadron, and the soon-to-be decommissioned INS Krishna.

In December 2012, ABG shipyard got a repeat order for building an additional cadet training vessel for the Indian Navy worth about Rs. 485 crore ($89.4 million).

== See also ==
- L&T fast interceptor craft
- Solas Marine Fast Interceptor Boat
- ABG Interceptor Class fast attack crafts
- Couach fast interceptor boats
- GSL/GRSE series of Interceptor Boats
- Cochin Fast Patrol Vessels
- Alcock Ashdown Survey Catamaran
