= GSL/GRSE series of Interceptor Boats =

GSL/GRSE series of Interceptor Boats are Indian high speed patrol boats assembled by Garden Reach Shipbuilders & Engineers Limited (GRSE), Kolkata and Goa Shipyard Limited (GSL), Goa.

They were designed by Greek shipbuilder, Motomarine, later on GRSE bought this design. GRSE is assembling it at its shipyard in the Bay of Bengal, whereas GSL is also simultaneously assembling the same boats in its Arabian Sea yard. They are being built as per the contract contracted by GSL and GRSE with Ministry of Home Affairs in March, 2008 for various state marine police under the Coastal Security Scheme. The armoring of the patrol boats is being done by MKU Pvt Ltd.

== Variants ==
There are two variants of GSL/GRSE Interceptor Boat: Hell raisers and Invaders.

=== Hell Raiser ===
The 12-tonne vessel is built of glass-reinforced plastic, has a length of 13 metres with maximum draught at full load 0.90 m and has a bulletproof cabin. It has a water-jet propulsion giving high speed and ability to operate in shallow water. The vessel endurance is 75 nautical miles and can further cover 25 nautical miles with the help of reserved fuel. The vessel can travel at the maximum speed of 35 nautical miles per hour. The boats are highly seaworthy, unsinkable type (having 10% reserve buoyancy even when filled with water) and are able to sustain operation up to sea state 3 in open sea and also in breaking sea waves near the coast while in shallow water. The vessel is equipped with ultra modern navigation and GPS (Global Positioning System) and can carry a crew of 4 with patrol party of 16. It has facilities for mounting light machine guns and other weapons on board. The per unit cost of vessel is Rs. 25 million (2010).

=== Invaders ===
Invaders is 9.60 m in length, have weight of 5 tonnes and is capable of operating at 35 knots on full load. It have maximum draught of 0.65 m at full load. It can carry four crew members along with a patrolling party of 10 persons and is equipped with life saving, fire fighting and communication facilities. The boat is fitted with two outboard motors of 275 hp each for propulsion and maneuvering. The per unit cost of vessel is Rs. 10-11 million (2008).

Detail of end user of boats under coastal security phase-1.
Builder : Goa Shipyard Limited
State	Hell Raiser	Invaders	Total
Gujarat Marine Police	20	10	30
Maharashtra Marine Police	6	22	28
Goa Marine Police	6	3	9
Karnataka Marine Police	10	5	15
Kerala Marine Police	16	8	24
Lakshadweep Marine Police	2	4	6
Daman & Diu Marine Police	2	2	4
Sub total	62	54	116
Builder : Garden Reach Shipbuilders and Engineers Limited (GRSE)
Tamil Nadu Marine Police	12	12	24
Andhra Pradesh Marine Police	12	6	18
Orissa Marine Police	10	5	15
West Bengal Marine Police	12	6	18
Puducherry Marine Police	2	1	3
A&N Marine Police	10		10
Sub total	48	30	78
Grand total	120	84	204

== See also ==
- Solas Marine Fast Interceptor Boat
- L&T Interceptor Class fast attack crafts
- Couach fast interceptor boats
- Cochin Fast Patrol Vessels
- Alcock Ashdown Survey Catamaran
- Manoram class ferry
- GSL Class Advanced Offshore Patrol Vessel
