= Samarth-class patrol vessel =

Class of Indian Coast Guard patrol vessels

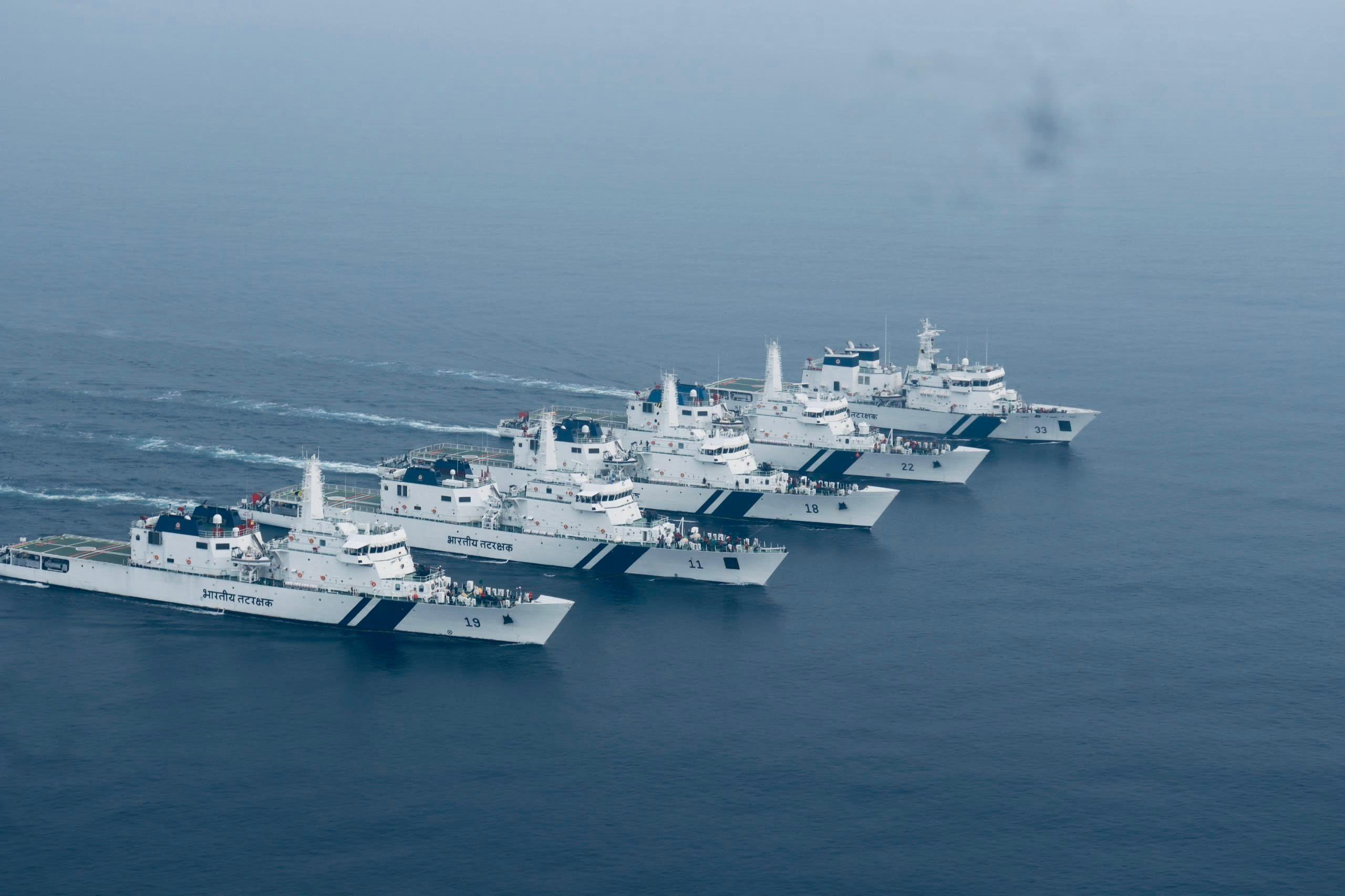
- Sujeete (19), Samarth (11), Sachet (18), Saksham (22) and Vikram (33) sailing in unison during coast guard exercise

Class overview
- Name: Samarth class
- Builders: Goa Shipyard
- Operators: Indian Coast Guard
- Preceded by: Vishwast class
- Succeeded by: Vikram class
- Built: 2012–2019
- In commission: 2015–Present
- Planned: 11
- Completed: 11
- Active: 11

General characteristics
- Type: Patrol boat
- Displacement: 2,450 t (2,410 long tons; 2,700 short tons)
- Length: 105 m (344 ft 6 in)
- Beam: 13.6 m (44 ft 7 in)
- Draught: 6.2 m (20 ft 4 in)
- Installed power: 2 × MTU 20V 8000 M71L engines rated at 9,100 kW (12,200 hp)
- Propulsion: 2 x controllable pitch propellers
- Speed: 23 knots (43 km/h; 26 mph)
- Range: 6,000 nmi (11,000 km; 6,900 mi) at 12 kn (22 km/h; 14 mph)
- Endurance: 20 days
- Boats & landing craft carried: 4 boats
- Complement: 18 officers & 108 sailors
- Armament: 1 × 30 mm CRN 91 Naval Gun; 2 × 12.7 mm HMG
- Aircraft carried: 2 × HAL Dhruv

The Samarth-class offshore patrol vessel are a series of eleven offshore patrol vessels being built by Goa Shipyard Limited for the Indian Coast Guard. The construction of Samarth class was motivated by a desire to triple the Coast Guard assets in the aftermath of 2008 Mumbai attacks. They are an improvement over the earlier Sankalp class, with a larger beam and more powerful engines. The ships are being constructed in two batches—a batch of six ordered in May 2012 that was completed in December 2017 and a follow-on batch of five ordered in August 2016.

== History ==
Following the 2008 Mumbai attacks, the Indian Government initiated a program to triple the Indian Coast Guard force, assets and infrastructure. Thereafter in accordance with it a 'request for information' for acquisition of six offshore patrol vessels was issued by the Ministry of Defence on 1 April 2010. After technical evaluation and commercial bids a contract worth $400 million or Rs. 1800 crore was signed with GSL on 9 May 2012 to build six vessels.

On 14 May 2012 GSL did the first steel cutting in its shipyard, and the keel-laying ceremony of the first of the new class of offshore patrol vessels was held at Vasco da Gama on 28 September 2012. The second and third vessels were laid down 28 January and 11 October 2013, and the fourth on 9 January 2014. The first vessel was commissioned on 10 November 2015 and all six will be commissioned by the end of 2017.

In August 2016, a follow-on consisting of five patrol vessels was placed for INR 20 billion. The follow-on vessels will have a greater indigenous content of 70% compared to the 62% of the previous batch.

Sachet the first OPV was launched on 21 February 2019 and commissioned on 15 May 2020 by Defence Minister Rajnath Singh by video conferencing.

Sujeet the second OPV from the second batch was handed to Indian Coast Guard on 12 November 2020 and later commissioned on 15 December 2020.

Sajag the third OPV was delivered ahead of time on 16 March 2021. The ship was commissioned by NSA Ajit Doval on May 29, 2021.

Sarthak was delivered ahead of schedule and was commissioned in the Indian Coast Guard on 28 October 2021.

Saksham the last ship of the project was delivered ahead of schedule on 8 February 2022. All 5 ships of the Fleet 2 were delivered ahead of schedule.

== Description ==
The class is 105 metres (344 ft 6 in) long with a displacement of 2,350 tonnes. Features include Integrated Bridge System, Integrated Machinery Control System, Power Management System and High Power External Fire Fighting System. They are designed to carry one twin engine Light Helicopter and five high speed boats including two Palfinger QRIBs for fast boarding operations, search and rescue, law enforcement and maritime patrol. The class is also capable of carrying pollution response equipment to combat oil spill contamination at sea.

== Service history ==
On 17 July 2024, the Indian Coast Guard carried out a rescue operation of the Indian fishing boat Aashni. The boat, with 11 crew and around 80 nautical miles (150 km; 92 mi) from Kochi, Kerala, faced heavy rain and challenging weather conditions. Due to loss of propulsion and flooding from a hull rupture close to the keel, the vessel was in a serious situation. A Dornier 228 surveillance aircraft of the ICG located the vessel on the night of 16 July 2024. ICGS Saksham was immediately diverted towards its location after receiving an order from the ICG District Headquarters No 4 (Kerala & Mahe). Eventually, ICGS Abhinav, an Aadesh-class patrol vessel, was also deployed along with a HAL Dhruv helicopter. The technical team from the ICG assisted in the de-flooding operations and rescued the crew members and recovered the distressed the vessel. After the culmination of the operation, the boat was handed over to the Fisheries Department.

On 19 July 2024, Maritime Rescue Coordination Center (MRCC) Mumbai of ICG received distress call from container carrier MV Maersk Frankfurt about 50 nmi (93 km; 58 mi) off Karwar about a major fire on board. Immediately, Sachet, Sujeet and Samrat along with a Dornier 228 aircraft and a HAL Dhruv helicopter were deployed by Coast Guard District HQ No 11 (Goa) for aerial surveillance operations. ICGS Samudra Prahari also provided support. As of 20 July, after 12 hours of effort, the fire in the front section of the ship was suppressed but the fire in the midship section was ablaze. The ICG was preparing for the provision of dry chemical powder (DCP) bags and balls to support firefighting operations. As of 21 July, after 24 hours of distress call, the ship was 17 nmi (31 km; 20 mi) off Karwar and the ICG was battling smoke and small fires on board the container ship. The ICG decided to use DCP to douse the fire. One crew member died in the incident. The cause of the fire was expected to be a short circuit after which the fire spread to the cargo classified as International Maritime Dangerous Goods (IMDG) that was on board, according to a report. The ship was en route from Mundra Port, India to the Port of Colombo, Sri Lanka. On 22 July, ICG's Deputy Inspector General Bhatia confirmed that the fire was under control after using 150 kg (330 lb) of DCP bags deployed from helicopters. There were no fire in the dangerous goods section of the ship. Small fires were still burning, but four vessels of ICG were near the ship and helicopters were taking routine visits. The ship was out of danger. No oil pollution was reported but adequate preparation was taken and the ICG asked Karnataka, Goa and Kerala to activate the pollution response mechanism. By 30 July, Operation Sahayata was complete and a total of five ships, one Dornier aircraft and two Dhruv helicopters were deployed for the job. More than 1,200 kg (2,600 lb) of DCP was used. Infrared images confirmed that hotspots has reduced and smoldering was reduced to one small part of the ship. There were no more pollution risks and the ship was stable and operational.

On 21 August 2024, ICGS Sujay made a port call with an integral helicopter in Jakarta, Indonesia for a two-day visit. On 4 September 2024, Sujay made another port call at Incheon, South Korea. The ICG officials conducted professional interactions with the Korea Coast Guard (KCG) for topics like marine pollution response, maritime search and rescue and maritime law enforcement. The visit was a part of Indian Coast Guard's East Asia deployment and a memorandum of understanding (MoU) was signed between the ICG and KCG in 2006 for enhanced maritime cooperation. On 18 September 204, Sujay reached Bali, Indonesia, for a three-day visit. Formal discussions with the Indonesian Maritime Security Agency (IMSA) during the visit focused on operational turn around, marine pollution response, maritime search and rescue and maritime law enforcement. The visit was a result of an MoU signed between the ICG and BAKAMLA (IMSA) on 6 July 2020 to enhance maritime cooperation and institutionalised its cooperative engagements. The crew in this deployment included 10 National Cadet Corps (NCC).

On 9 December 2025, ICGS Sarthak reached Shuwaikh Port, Kuwait for a four-day visit as part of her Overseas Deployment to the Gulf region.

ICGS Sarathi forms a part of the 1st Training Squadron (1TS) of the Indian Navy and was part of the 2025 and 2026 Long Range Training Deployment (LRTD) flotilla to the South West Indian Ocean Region and South East Asia. The ship also took part in the International Fleet Review 2026 held near Visakhapatnam on 18 February 2026.

ICGS Shaunak departed Chennai for Perth, Australia on 25 September 2026 as part of the QUAD-At-Sea Observer Mission. Six "Sea Riders" has boarded the ship, including two each from India and Japan and one each from Australia and the United States, for shipboard activities and professional exchanges.

== Ships of the class ==
Yard Number	Name	Pennant number	Keel laid	Launched	Commissioned	Home Port
Indian Coast Guard
Flight I
1218	Samarth	11	28 September 2012	26 November 2014	10 November 2015	Goa
1219	Shoor	12	28 January 2013	21 March 2015	11 April 2016	Manglore
1220	Sarathi	14	11 October 2013	24 April 2015	9 September 2016	Kochi
1221	Shaunak	15	9 January 2014	28 November 2015	21 February 2017	Vizag
1222	Shaurya	16	22 July 2014	5 May 2016	12 August 2017	Chennai
1223	Sujay	17	8 June 2015	30 November 2016	21 December 2017	Chennai
Flight II
1233	Sachet	18	20 March 2017	21 February 2019	15 May 2020	
1234	Sujeet	19	29 September 2017	25 May 2019	15 December 2020	
1235	Sajag	20	1 August 2018	14 November 2019	29 May 2021	Porbandar
1236	Sarthak	21	10 November 2018	13 August 2020	28 October 2021	Porbandar
1237	Saksham	22	10 June 2019	14 December 2020	16 March 2022	Goa

== See also ==
- L&T Interceptor class fast attack craft
- Solas Marine Fast Interceptor Boat
- Couach fast interceptor boats
- Cochin Fast Patrol Vessels
- ABG fast interceptor craft
- Makar-class survey catamaran
- Rani Abbakka-class patrol vessel
- Manoram-class ferry

== Gallery ==
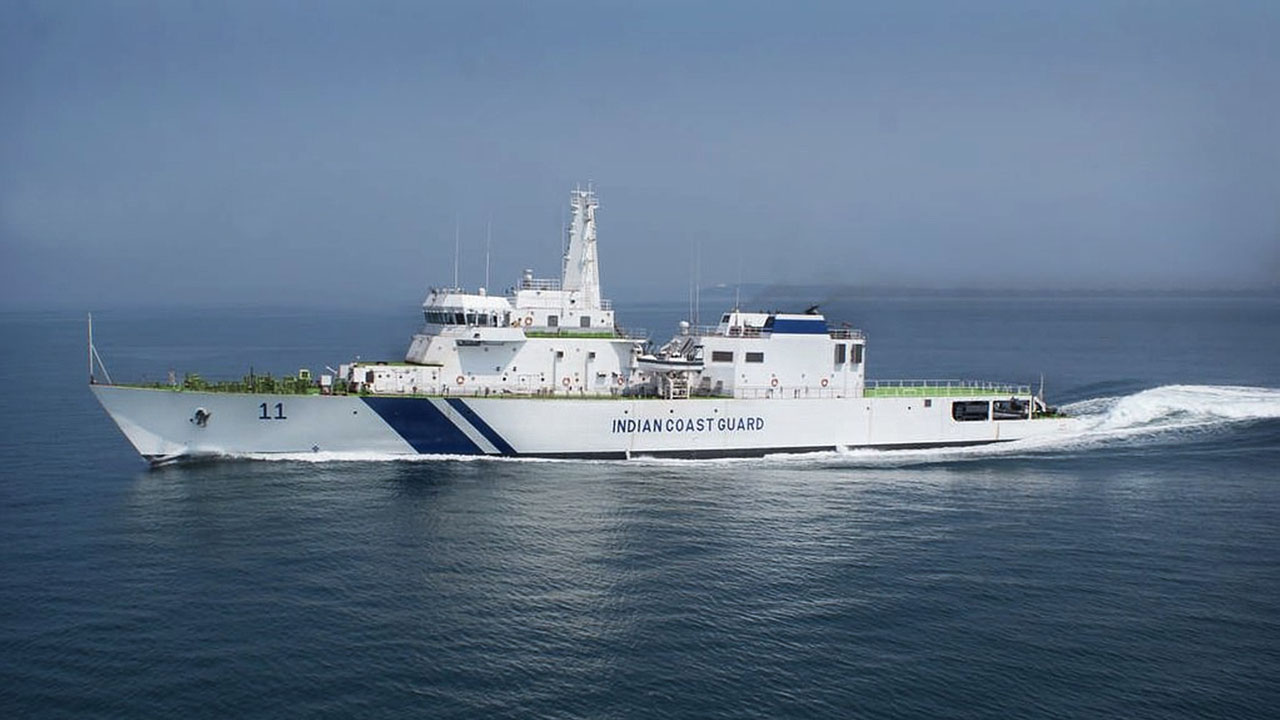
Samarth (11) at sea.

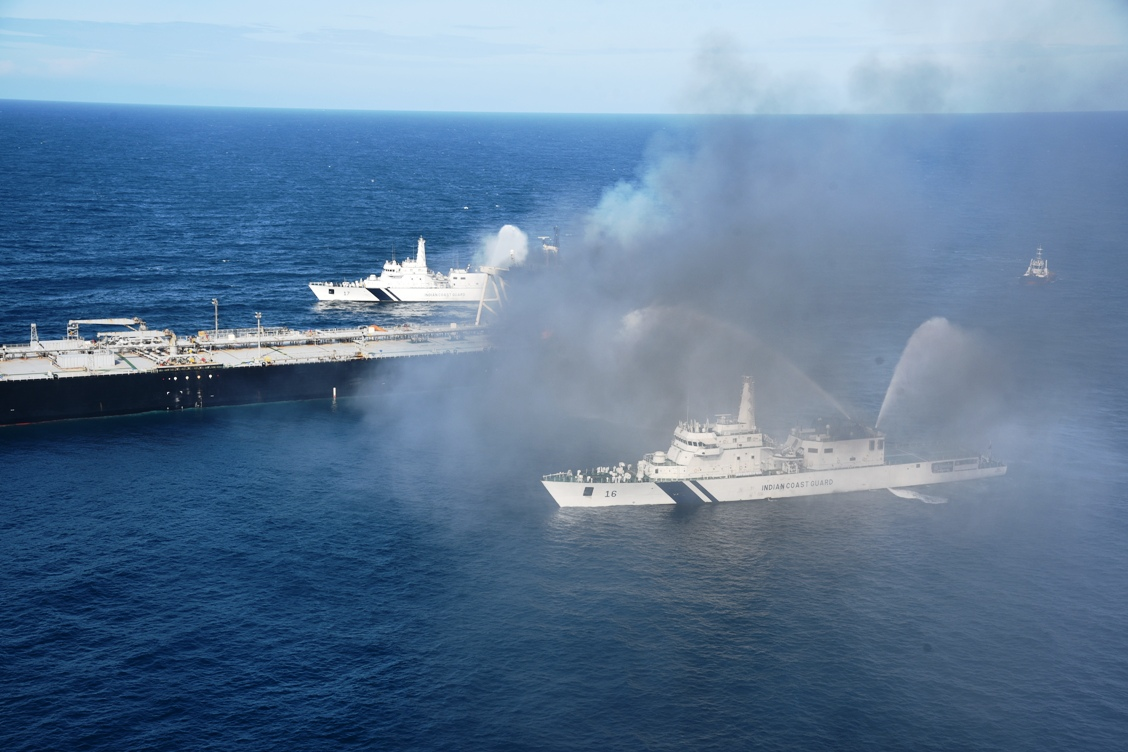
ICGS Shaurya and ICGS Sujay during fire dousing operation.

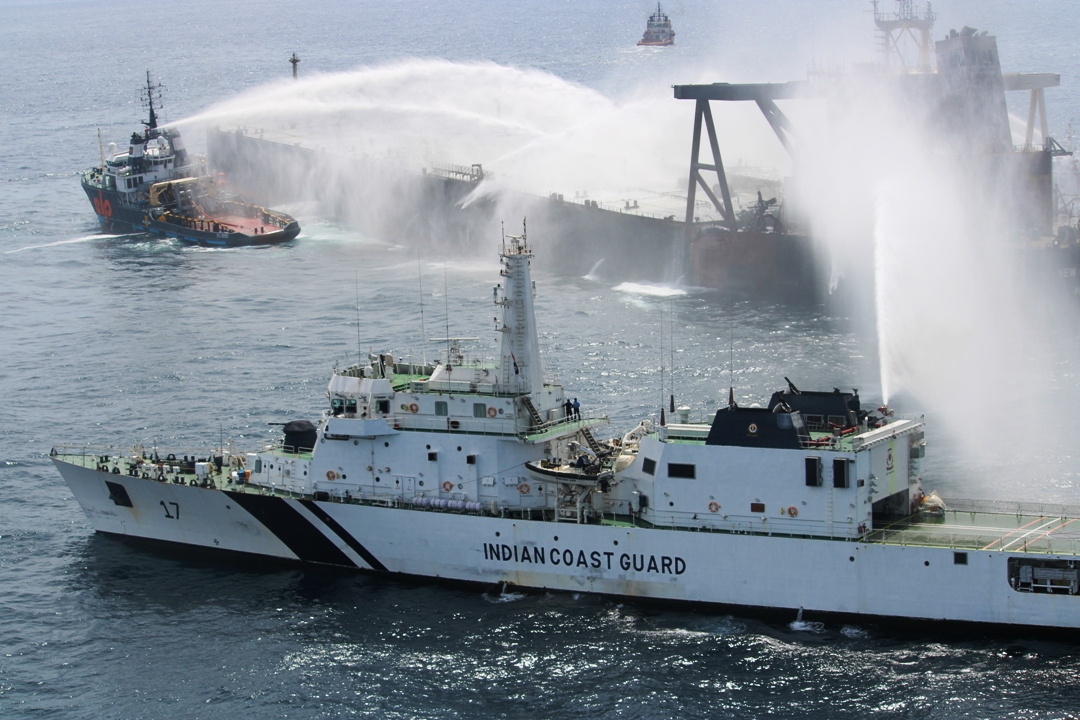
ICGS Sujay during MT New Diamond fire suppression mission.

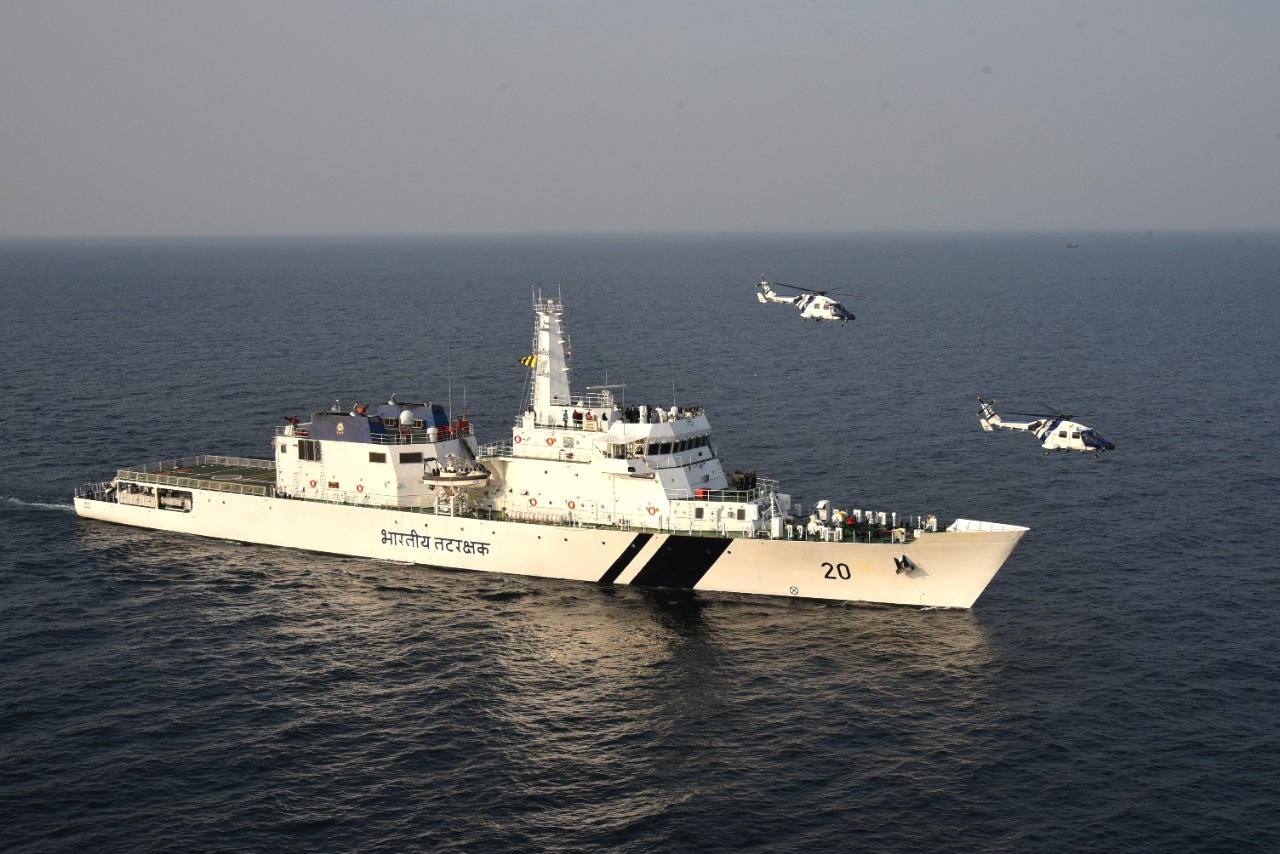
ICGS Sajag with Dhruv Mk.3 helicopters.

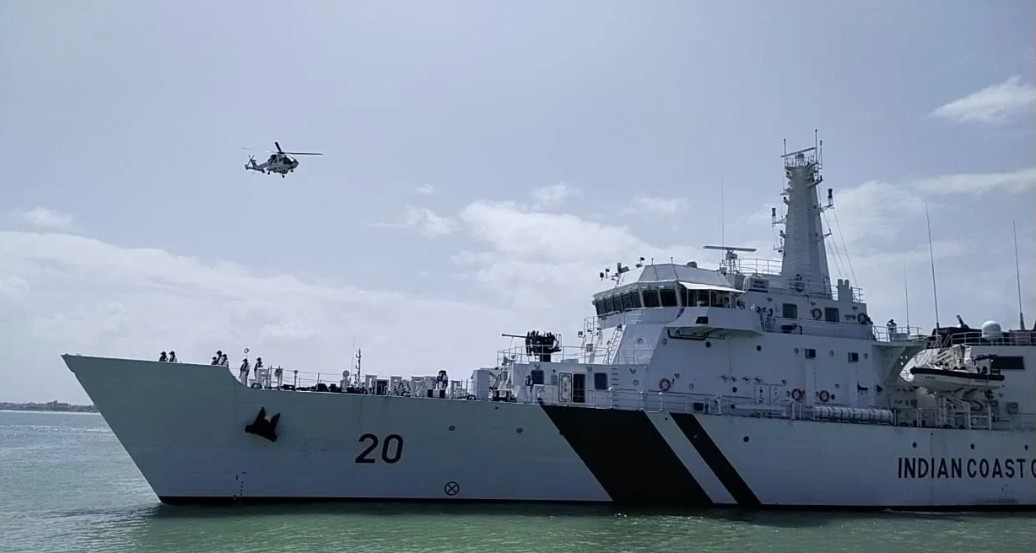
ICGS Sajag at Porbandar, Gujarat

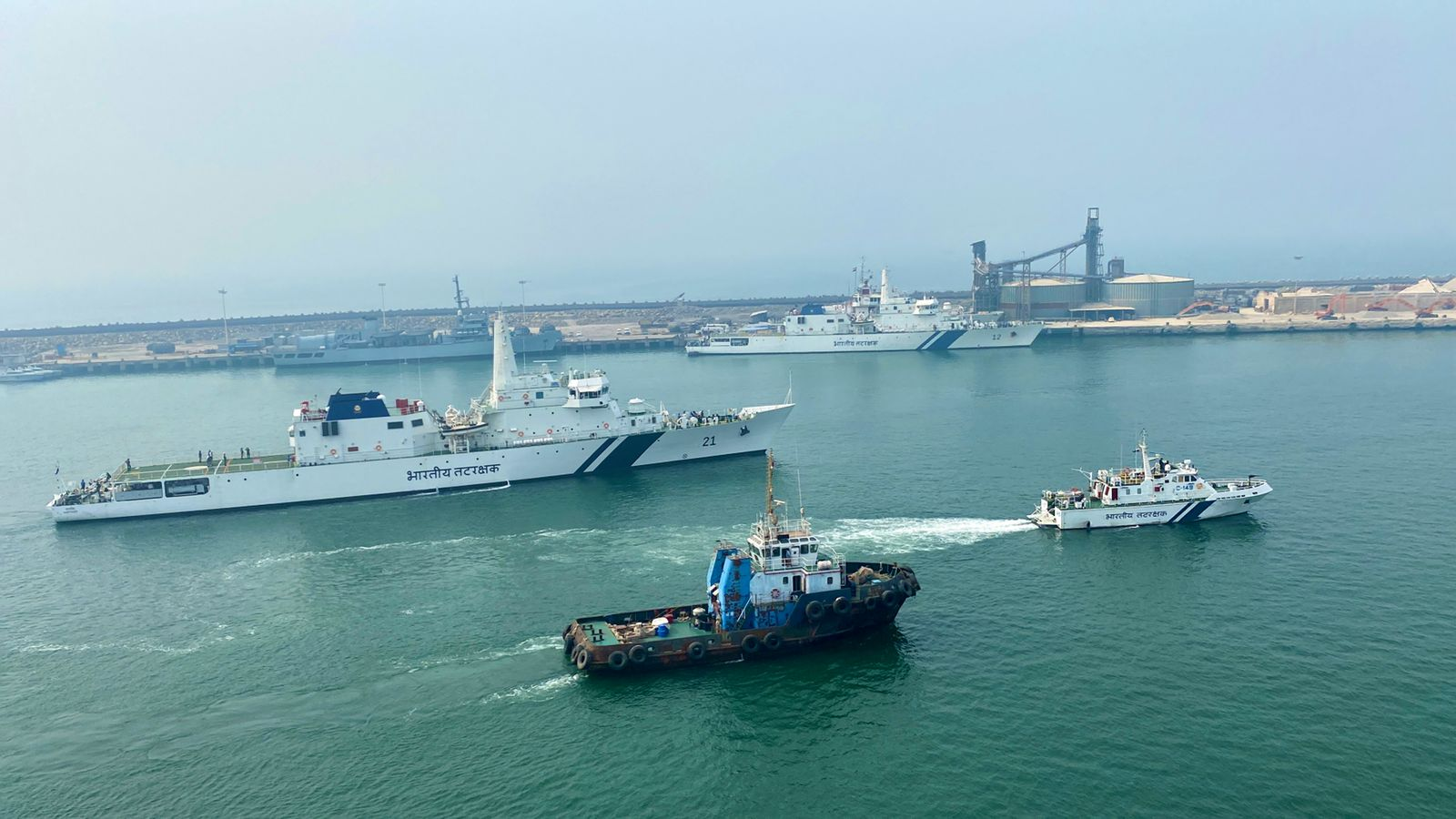
ICGS Sarthak (21) and ICGS Shoor (12) at the port of Porbandar, Gujarat.

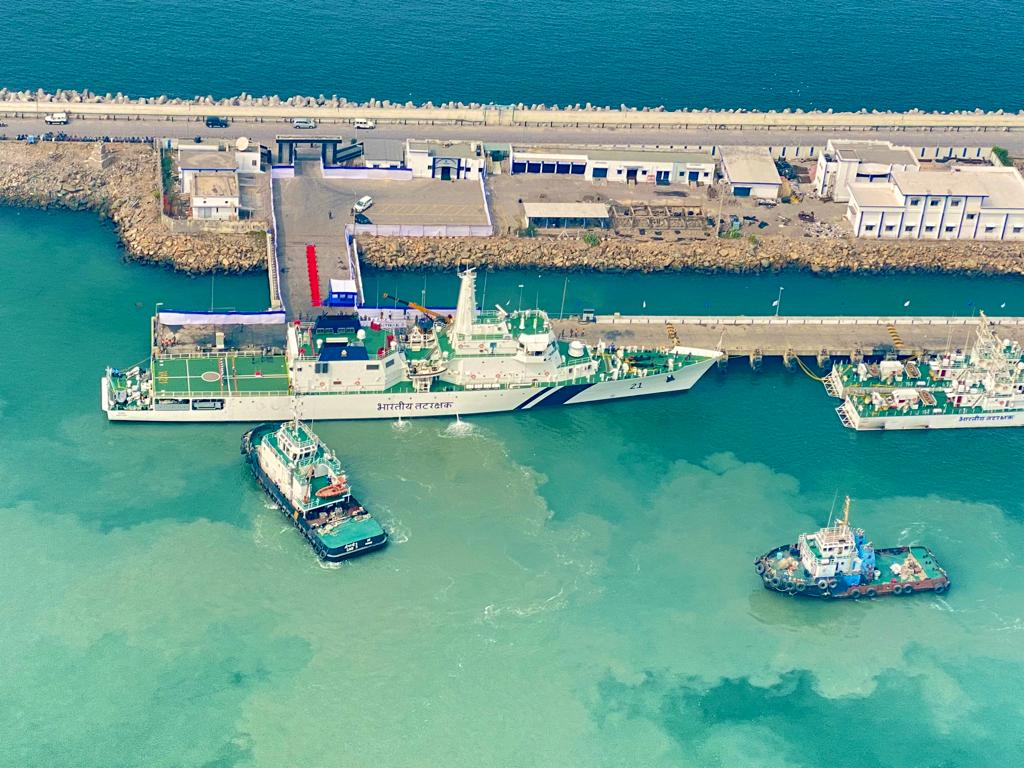
ICGS Sarthak at the port of Porbandar

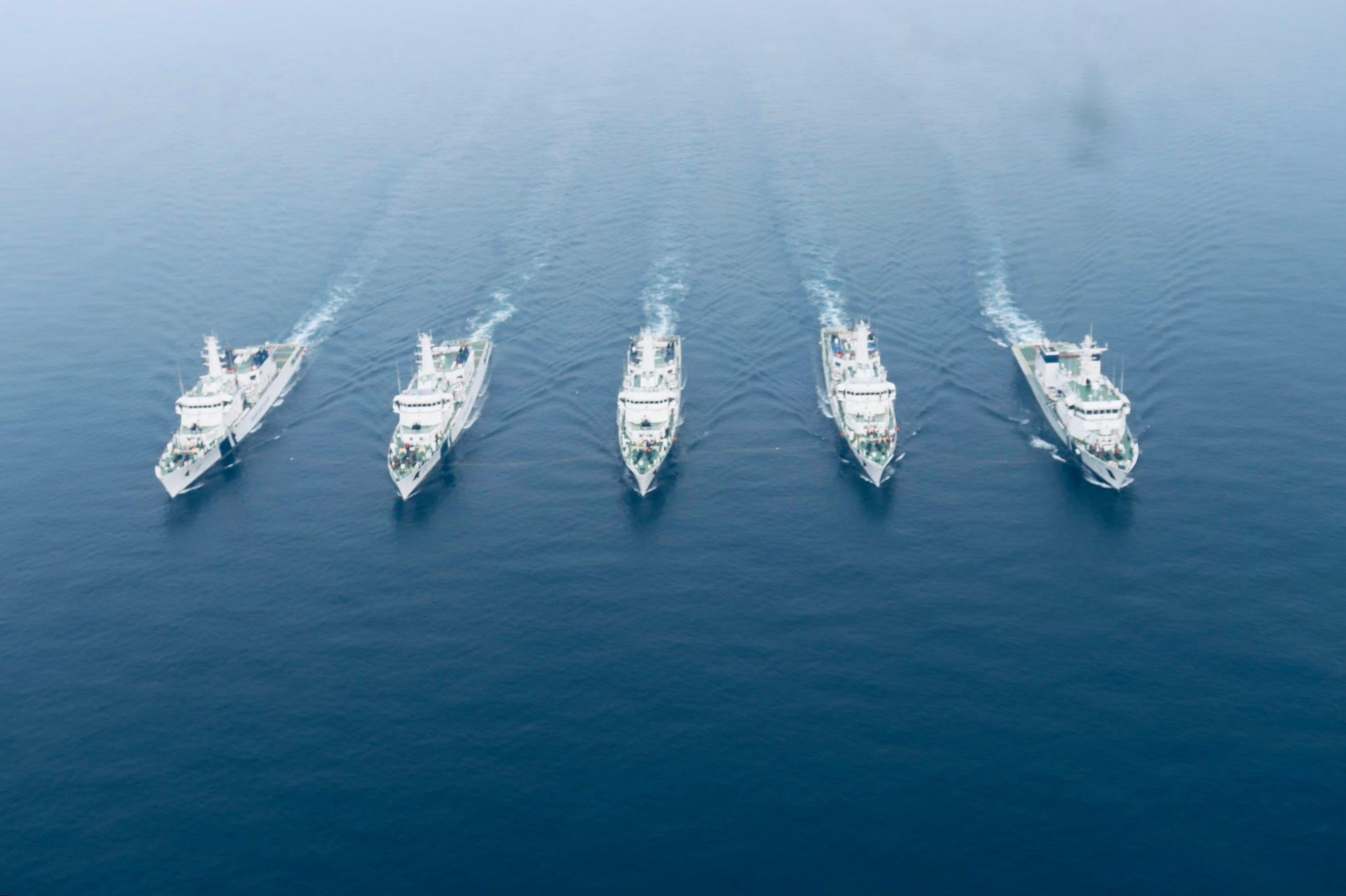
Sujeete (19), Samarth (11), Sachet (18), Saksham (22) and Vikram (33) sailing in unison.
