= Samudra-class pollution control vessel =

Pollution control vessels in service with the Indian Coast Guard

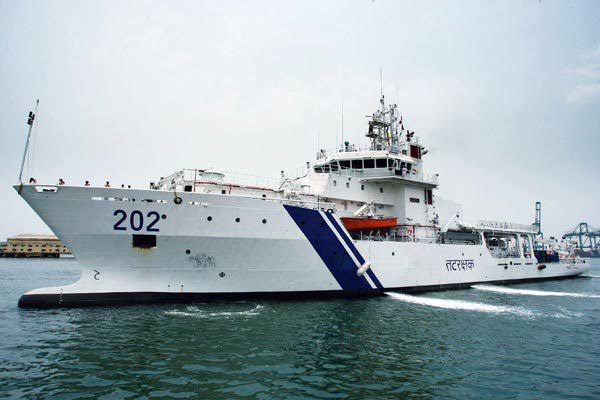
- ICGS Samudra Pahredar

Class overview
- Name: Samudra class
- Builders: ABG Shipyard
- Operators: Indian Coast Guard
- Succeeded by: GSL class
- Planned: 3
- Completed: 3
- Active: 3

General characteristics
- Type: Pollution control vessel
- Displacement: 3,946 t (3,884 long tons)
- Length: 94 m (308 ft 5 in)
- Beam: 15.5 m (50 ft 10 in)
- Draught: 4.5 m (14 ft 9 in)
- Propulsion: 2 x Bergen Diesel B32, 40 L6P (3,000 kW (4,000 hp) each); 1 x 883 kW (1,184 hp) UlsteinAquamaster bow thruster
- Speed: 26 knots (48 km/h; 30 mph)
- Range: 6,000 nmi (11,000 km; 6,900 mi)
- Endurance: 20 days
- Complement: 10 officers and 100 sailors
- Armament: 1 × CRN 91 naval gun; 2 × 12.7 mm HMG

The Samudra-class pollution control vessel is a class of three patrol vessels built by ABG Shipyard in Gujarat, India, for the Indian Coast Guard.

== Design ==
The ships have been designed by Rolls-Royce Holdings and have the type number UT 517. The vessels are 94 metres (308 ft 5 in) long, with a maximum draught of 4.5 metres (14 ft 9 in) and a displacement of 3,300 tonnes (3,200 long tons). The vessels are designed to attain speed of 20.5 knots (38.0 km/h; 23.6 mph). They have an endurance of 6,500 nautical miles (12,000 km; 7,500 mi) nautical miles at economical speed and can stay at sea for 20 days. The ships are crewed by 10 officers and 100 sailors specialized in various streams.

=== Power and propulsion ===
Each vessel is fitted with two Rolls-Royce supplied Bergen B32 diesel engines, two Kamewa Ulstein propeller plants, an Ulstein Aquamaster thruster, Tenfjord steering gear, an Ulstein rudder, Rauma Brattvaag deck machinery, Ulstein automation system and switchboards and Intering anti-roll stabilization. Their anti-roll stabilization system is the first to be incorporated on a coast guard vessel built in India. Other major features of vessels are Integrated Platform Management System (IPMS) and dynamic positioning system enabling the vessel to be maneuvered in restricted areas with precision.

=== Pollution control equipment ===
The equipment on board is used for containment, recovery, separation and dispersal of pollutants. Control systems enable simultaneous tasks to be performed by a single operator. The vessel is fitted with latest pollution control equipment including two rigid sweeping arms enabling it to contain oil spill whilst in motion. An advanced software would assist in predicting the spread of the complex oil spill pattern. The vessel is designed to recover the lightest to the most viscous oil at the rate of 300 t (300 long tons; 330 short tons) per hour. The contaminated water can be pumped on board and analysed in a laboratory. The oil can then be separated and held in storage tanks of 300 t (300 long tons; 330 short tons) capacity or 1,000 t (980 long tons; 1,100 short tons) in inflatable barges which can be towed behind the vessel to free up deck space. The vessel is also equipped with firefighting and marine salvage systems.

=== Secondary role ===
The secondary role includes peacetime patrolling, firefighting and salvage. For maritime law enforcement, exclusive economic zone (EEZ) surveillance, anti smuggling, fishery protection, search & rescue and high speed interdiction it is equipped with CRN 91 naval gun, light helicopter, five High Speed Boats and four Water Scooters. An Infra Red Surveillance System is also installed on-board providing additional capability for the ship's crew to detect targets in the night. The vessels are also equipped with fire fighting and salvage systems.

== Launch and commissioning ==
The first vessel (CG 201) christened as Samudra Prahari (Ocean Striker) was launched on 20 March 2007 by Thrity R Contractor, wife of Vice Admiral RF Contractor, Director General, Indian Coast Guard. It was commissioned at Mumbai on 9 October 2010 by Ashok Chavan, the Chief Minister of Maharashtra.

The second vessel (CG 202) christened as Samudra Paheredar (Ocean Guardian) was launched on 13 March 2009 by Urmila Singh, wife of Rajendra Singh, inspector general and commander of western region of Indian Coast Guard. It was commissioned at the Hazira port near Surat in Gujarat by Admiral Nirmal Verma, Chairman, Chiefs of Staff Committee and Chief of the Naval Staff on 21 July 2012.

== Ships of the class ==
Name	Pennant	Launched	Commissioning	HomePort
Samudra Prahari	CG 201	20 March 2007	9 October 2010	Mumbai
Samudra Paheredar	CG 202	12 March 2009	21 July 2012	Visakhapatnam
Samudra Pavak	CG 203	11 July 2012	14 January 2016	Vadinar

== See also ==
- Solas Marine fast interceptor boat
- Couach fast interceptor boats
- L&T-class fast interceptor craft
- Aadesh-class patrol vessel
- Makar-class catamaran
