= Rani Abbakka-class patrol vessel =

Indian Patrol vessel class

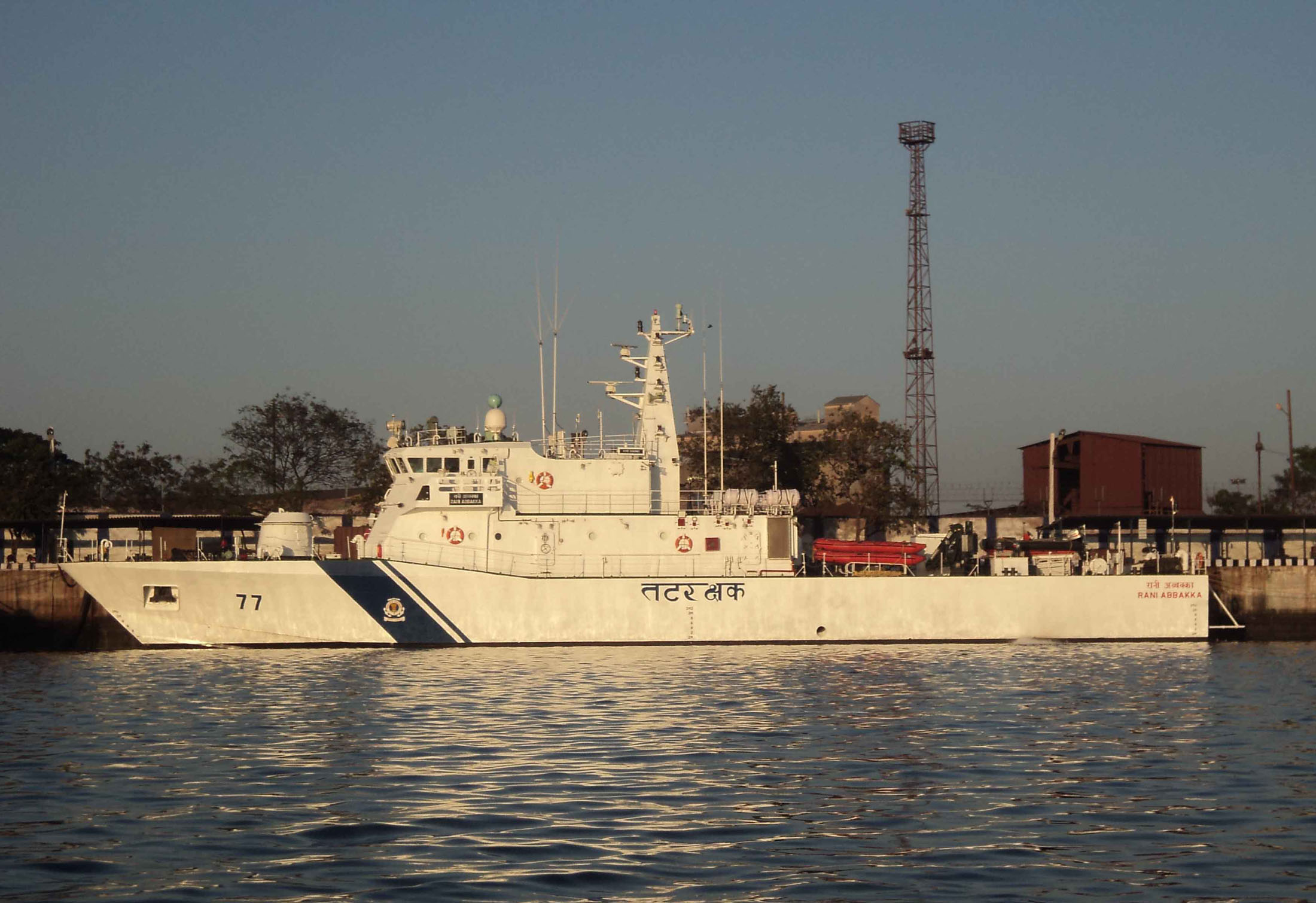
- ICGS Rani Abbakka during its commissioning

Class overview
- Name: Rani Abbakka class
- Builders: Hindustan Shipyard Ltd., Visakhapatnam, India
- Operators: Indian Coast Guard
- Preceded by: Sarojini Naidu class
- Succeeded by: Rajshree class
- Built: 2009–2012
- In commission: 2009–present
- Planned: 5+8
- Completed: 5
- Canceled: 8
- Active: 5

General characteristics
- Type: Inshore patrol vessel
- Displacement: 349 tonnes
- Length: 50 m (164 ft 1 in)
- Beam: 8.36 m (27 ft 5 in)
- Draught: 2.1 m (6 ft 11 in)
- Propulsion: 3 × MTU 4000 diesel engines, each 2,720 kW (3,648 hp) at 2100 rpm; 3 × 71S II Rolls-Royce waterjets
- Speed: 34 knots (63 km/h; 39 mph)
- Range: 1,500 nmi (2,800 km; 1,700 mi) at 14 kn (26 km/h; 16 mph)
- Boats & landing craft carried: 1 × rigid inflatable boat
- Complement: 5 Officers and 34 Sailors
- Armament: 1 x 30mm CRN 91 Naval Gun; 2 x 12.7mm HMG

The Rani Abbakka-class patrol vessel are a series of inshore patrol vessels being built by Hindustan Shipyard Ltd. for the Indian Coast Guard. They are based on the Australian Thornycroft design. The ship, incidentally, is named after Abbakka Mahadevi, the legendary queen of Tulunadu, Karnataka who fought the Portuguese in the latter half of the 16th Century.

== Design ==
The vessels have a length of 50 meters, beam of 8 metres, draught of 4.5 metres and have weight of 275 Tonnes. They are powered by three MTU 4000 series diesel engines of 2720 KW capacity at 2100-rpm each coupled with three 71S II Rolls-Royce waterjets with top speed of 31.5 knots and an endurance of 1,500 nautical miles at cruise speed of 14 knots. The patrol vessels are fitted with an advanced Global Maritime Distress and Safety System (GMDSS), to carryout search and rescue operations. Other features include Integrated Bridge System (IBS), Machinery Control System, Infra-red Communication System. Armament consist of one CRN 91 Naval Gun along with its fire control system. They also carry one rigid inflatable boat. The ship's crew consists of five officers and 34 men.

== Ships of the class ==
The first of the series ICGS Rani Abbakka was launched on 28 May 2009 at Hindustan Shipyard Limited, Visakhapatnam. It was commissioned, at Visakhapatnam, by MM Pallam Raju, Defense state minister on 20 January 2012 in the presence of Vice Admiral Anil Chopra, AVSM, Flag Officer Commanding in Chief (East), Vice Admiral MP Muralidharan, AVSM NM Director General Indian Coast Guard. The second ship of the series, ICGS Rani Avantibai, was handed over to the Indian Coast Guard on 8 May 2013. It was commissioned on 9 May 2013 by Sri Jitendra Singh, Union Minister of State for Defence. The third ship of the series, ICGS Rani Durgvati, was commissioned at Visakhapatnam by Eastern Naval Command Chief Vice Admiral Satish Soni. The fourth ship of the series, ICGS Rani Gaidinliu, was commissioned at Visakhapatnam by Director General of Indian Coast Guard Rajendra Singh on 19 October 2016. An order for eight additional ships of the Rani Abbakka class placed in March 2011 was cancelled.

Yard No	Name (Namesake)	Pennant No	Launched	Commissioning	Homeport	Status
11154	ICGS Rani Abbakka	77	28 May 2009	20 January 2012	Chennai	Active
11155	ICGS Rani Avanti Bai	78	4 November 2009	9 May 2013	Visakhapatnam	Active
11156	ICGS Rani Durgavati	79	15 May 2010	6 July 2015	Karaikal	Active
11157	ICGS Rani Gaidinliu	80	6 November 2010	19 October 2016	Krishnapatnam	Active
11158	ICGS Rani Rashmoni	81	15 July 2011	18 June 2018	Visakhapatnam	Active

== See also ==
- Solas Marine Fast Interceptor Boat
- L&T Interceptor Class fast attack crafts
- Couach fast interceptor boats
- Cochin Fast Patrol Vessels
- Rajshree-class patrol vessel
- ABG fast interceptor craft
- Alcock Ashdown Survey Catamaran
- Manoram-class ferry
