= Makar-class catamaran =

Catamarans of the Indian Navy

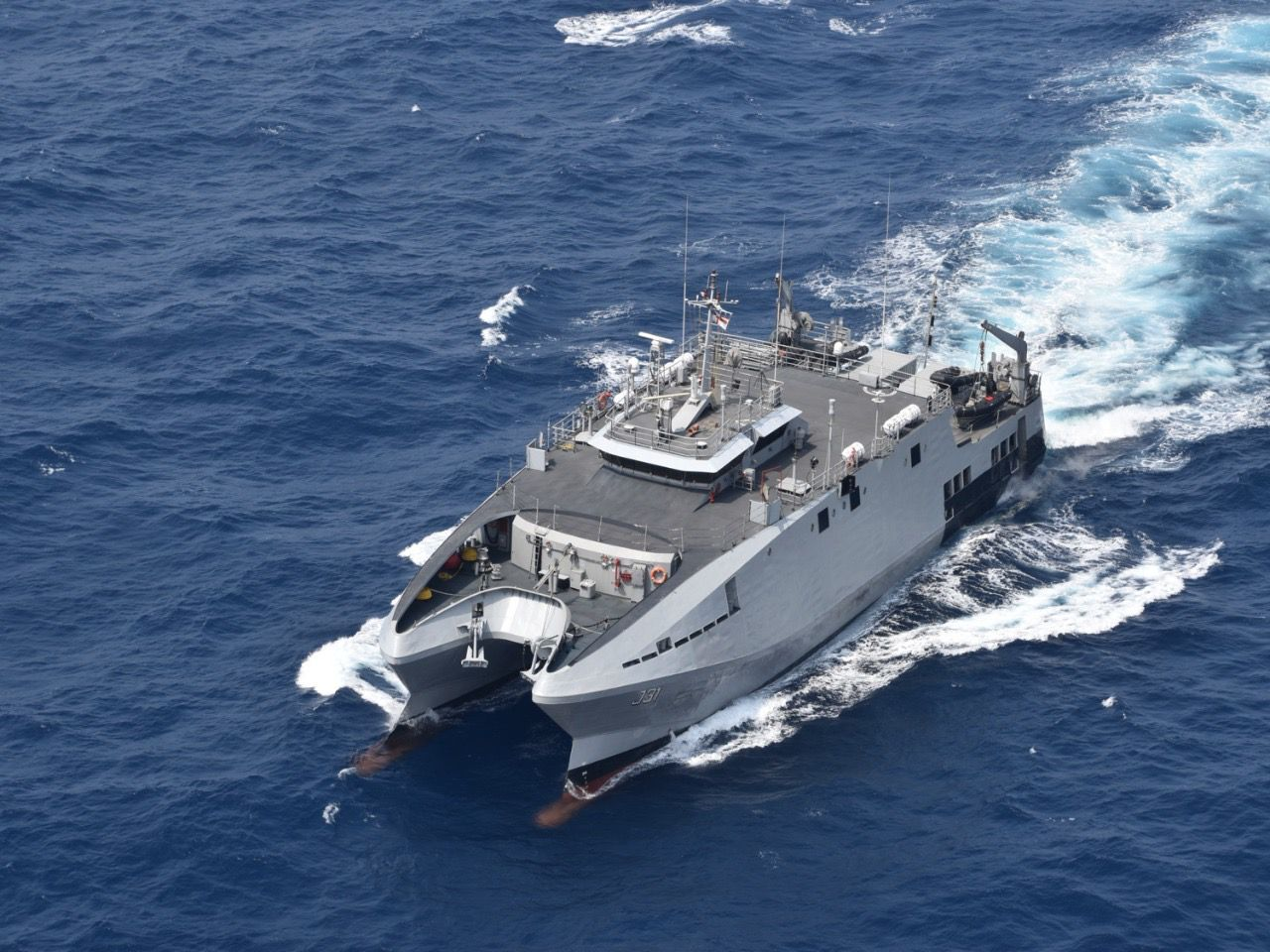
- INS Makar

Class overview
- Name: Makar class
- Builders: Alcock Ashdown Gujarat Ltd
- Operators: Indian Navy
- Preceded by: Sandhayak-class survey ship (1981)
- Succeeded by: Sandhayak-class survey vessel (2023)
- Cost: ₹800 crore (US$83 million)
- Planned: 6
- Completed: 1
- Canceled: 5
- Active: 1

General characteristics
- Type: Catamaran
- Displacement: 500 tons
- Length: 53.15 m (174 ft 5 in)
- Beam: 16.0 m (52 ft 6 in)
- Draught: 2.2 m (7 ft 3 in)
- Depth: 4.5 m (14 ft 9 in)
- Installed power: 4 × 1,007 kW (1,350 hp) Cummins KTA 38M2
- Propulsion: Two bow thrusters
- Speed: Maximum speed: 18 knots (33 km/h; 21 mph)
- Range: 3,000 nmi (5,600 km; 3,500 mi) at economic cruising
- Boats & landing craft carried: Carries two motor boats, also carries autonomous underwater vehicles (AUVs) and remotely operated vehicles (ROVs)
- Complement: 6 officers and 44 sailors, and 6 scientists
- Sensors & processing systems: Advanced Electronic Positioning System, Multi-beam Swath Sounding Systems and Sub-Bottom Profiler. Equipped with modern oceanographic and land survey equipment.

The Makar-class survey catamarans were a series of six 500-ton steel hull/aluminium superstructure hydrographic survey catamarans being built by Alcock Ashdown (Gujarat) Ltd at its Bhavnagar shipyard for the Indian Navy. The ships are designed by an Australian naval architecture firm Sea Transport Solutions, which is based in Queensland's Gold Coast. The deal was canceled due to the extensive delays as the Navy was not satisfied with the timeline and a fresh award for construction of another class of survey vessels to the GRSE has also been undertaken. Only one ship was constructed.

== Description ==
The ships are intended to undertake coastal hydrographic survey, required for production of nautical charts and publications aimed at improving navigation through waters closer to coasts. The ships are also capable of limited coastal defence role in an emergency, limited search and rescue and limited ocean research. The ships are equipped with standard hydrographic survey equipment such as advanced electronic positioning system, multi-beam swath sounding systems and sub-bottom profiler. The ships also carry two survey motor boats along with Kongsberg Maritime's Hugin 1000 autonomous underwater vehicle (AUV) for closer investigations.

The catamarans are propelled by four Cummins engines as well as two bow thrusters. The entire propulsion, navigational and power management packages of the vessels are integrated in a L&T supplied single state-of-art integrated platform management system. The ship is also equipped with sophisticated Integrated Bridge System from L&T. The ships have ergonomic accommodation for the six officers and 44 sailors.

== Construction ==
Alcock Ashdown (Gujarat) Ltd was awarded this contract, worth ₹800 crore (US$83 million) on 28 December 2006 through open competitive bidding, beating others like Larsen & Toubro, ABG Shipyard and Garden Reach Shipbuilders & Engineers. As per original term of contract, the first vessel was to be delivered by 6 April 2009, while the remaining five vessels were to be delivered within a year from 6 July 2009. This was later rescheduled, the revised delivery period of vessels is from September 2011 to March 2013. INS Meen is under construction. The remaining four are awaiting administrative clarification.

== Ships of the class ==
Name	Pennant	Laid down	Launched	Sea trials	Commissioning	Homeport	Notes
INS Makar	J 31	2008	February 2010		21 September 2012	Karwar

== Cancellation of the deal ==
Indian Navy cancelled ₹8,000 crore (US$1.1 billion) deal with Alcock Ashdown over ten-year delays in a contract to supply of the six vessels. According to Navy officials only one of the vessels has been delivered and there is no sign or any timeline for the other five ships.

Further, the Ministry of Defence has awarded another contract for the construction of four survey vessels for the Indian Navy to Garden Reach Shipbuilders & Engineers (GRSE) Limited, Kolkata after it became the L1 bidder in the competitive bidding. These ships have a displacement of 3,300 tonnes. Therefore, these ships are likely to be more advanced and outperform the Makar class which has a displacement of only 500 tonnes.

== See also ==
- L&T-class fast interceptor craft
- Solas Marine fast interceptor boat
- ABG fast interceptor craft
- Couach fast interceptor boats
- GSL/GRSE series of Interceptor Boats
- Aadesh-class patrol vessel
- ABG-class training ship
- Rani Abbakka-class inshore patrol vessel
- Samarth-class offshore patrol vessel
- Manoram-class ferry
