= Reliance-class fast patrol vessel =

Class overview
- Name: Reliance class
- Builders: Reliance Defence and Engineering
- Operators: Indian Coast Guard
- Preceded by: Aadesh class
- Planned: 14
- Building: 1
- Active: 0

General characteristics
- Type: Fast patrol vessel
- Speed: 33 kn (61 km/h)
- Armament: 30 mm CRN naval gun; 2 x 12.7 mm HMG

The Reliance-class fast patrol vessels are a series of fourteen fast patrol vessels being built by Reliance Defence and Engineering, Pipavav, Gujarat for the Indian Coast Guard. The ships of this class have a medium surface range and are capable of operations in maritime zones of India.

== Description ==
In January 2017, Reliance Defence and Engineering won the contract to build fourteen ships for $137.68 million. The ships in this class are water jet propelled and have a speed of 33 knots. They are also equipped with a 30 mm CRN 91 Naval Gun and two 12.7 mm guns.

== Ships of the class ==
Name	Pennant Number	Keel laid	Date of Launch	Date of commission	Homeport
		August 2017		January 2022 (expected)	
