= ICGS Sachet =

Indian offshore patrol vessel

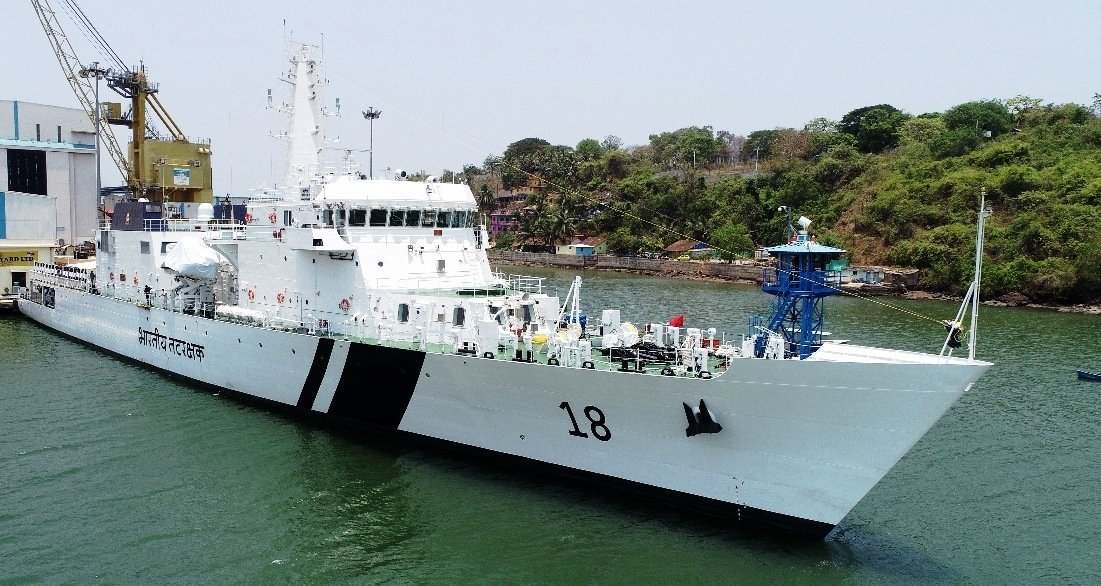
- ICGS Sachet during commissioning ceremony.

History

India
- Name: Sachet
- Namesake: 'Vigilant'
- Owner: Indian Coast Guard
- Builder: Goa Shipyard Limited
- Laid down: 20 March 2017
- Launched: 21 February 2019
- Acquired: 24 February 2020
- Commissioned: 15 May 2020
- Status: in active service

General characteristics
- Class & type: Samarth-class offshore patrol vessel
- Displacement: 2,450 tonnes (2,700 short tons)
- Length: 105 m (344 ft)
- Propulsion: 2 X diesel engines 9,100 kW (12,200 hp) each
- Speed: In excess of 23 kn (43 km/h; 26 mph)
- Endurance: 6,000 nmi (11,000 km)
- Complement: 98(14 Officers)
- Aircraft carried: 1x HAL Dhruv

ICGS Sachet is an offshore patrol vessel (OPV) of the Indian Coast Guard. Sachet is seventh ship in the Samarth-class OPV and the first ship from the second batch ordered by Indian Coast Guard and has been built by Goa Shipyard Limited. The vessel was commissioned to coast guard service on 15 May 2020 by Defence Minister Rajnath Singh. The commissioning is special as this was the first ever digital commissioning of any Indian Coast Guard's ship due to global pandemic COVID-19. Sachet will be extensively used for Exclusive Economic Zone and other duties as it is set to be exploited extensively. The vessel will be under the command of Deputy Inspector General Rajesh Mittal.

The vessel was laid down on 20 March 2017 and was subsequently launched on 21 February 2019. Goa Shipyard delivered the ship to Indian Coast Guard on 24 February 2020. With the commissioning of Sachet and other two interceptor craft, Indian Coast Guard became a force having 150 ships and boats with various other ship is construction.

== Service history ==
On 19 July 2024, the Indian Coast Guard (ICG) responded to a major fire aboard the container carrier MV Maersk Frankfurt, 50 nautical miles off Karwar. Multiple ICG vessels, aircraft, and personnel were deployed to contain the fire, which was caused by a short circuit and spread to dangerous goods cargo. These included Sachet, Sujeet and Samrat, along with a Dornier and a ALH Dhruv. ICGS Samudra Prahari also provided support.

After several days of firefighting efforts, the fire was extinguished on 30 July. One Filipino crew member died, and there was no significant oil pollution. The ICG used over 1200 kg of Dry Chemical Powder and coordinated with local authorities for pollution response.

On 19 June 2024, Sachet made a port call at the Port of Colombo to facilitate the transfer of essential spare parts, donated by the Indian Coast Guard, to the Sri Lanka Coast Guard ship Suraksha. The High Commissioner of India to Sri Lanka and the Secretary of the Ministry of Defence attended the ceremony.

On 28 February 2025, ICGS Sachet departed for Dijibouti with over two tonnes of medical and relief supplies destined for Sudan.

On 11 October 2025, the ship made a port call at Maputo, Mozambique amid its ongoing overseas deployment in Africa. Sachet is expected to deliver 20 metric tonnes of Humanitarian Assistance and Disaster Relief (HADR) material, including medical stores and medicines. The ship's crew is accompanied by NCC cadets and Assam Rifles personnel.

== Gallery ==
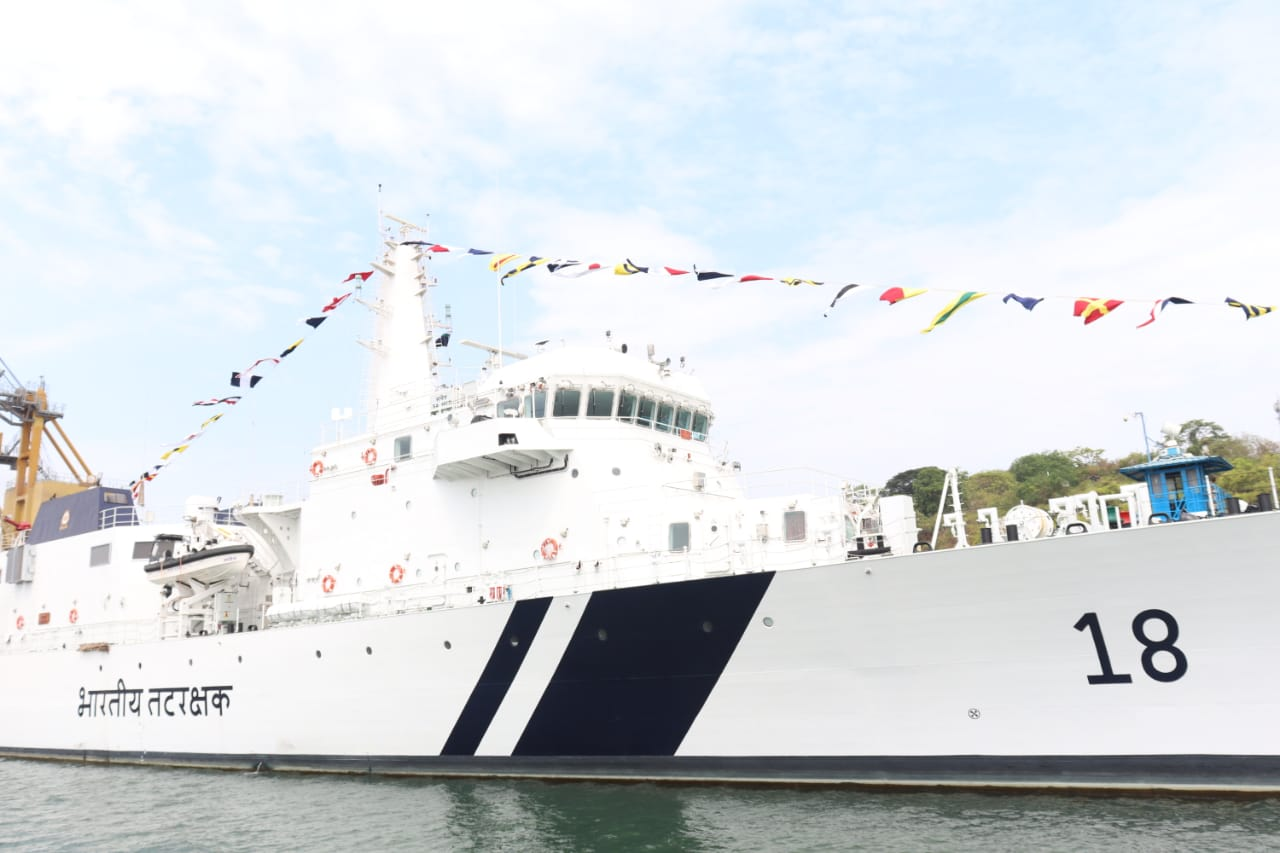
ICGS Sachet during commissioning ceremony at Goa.

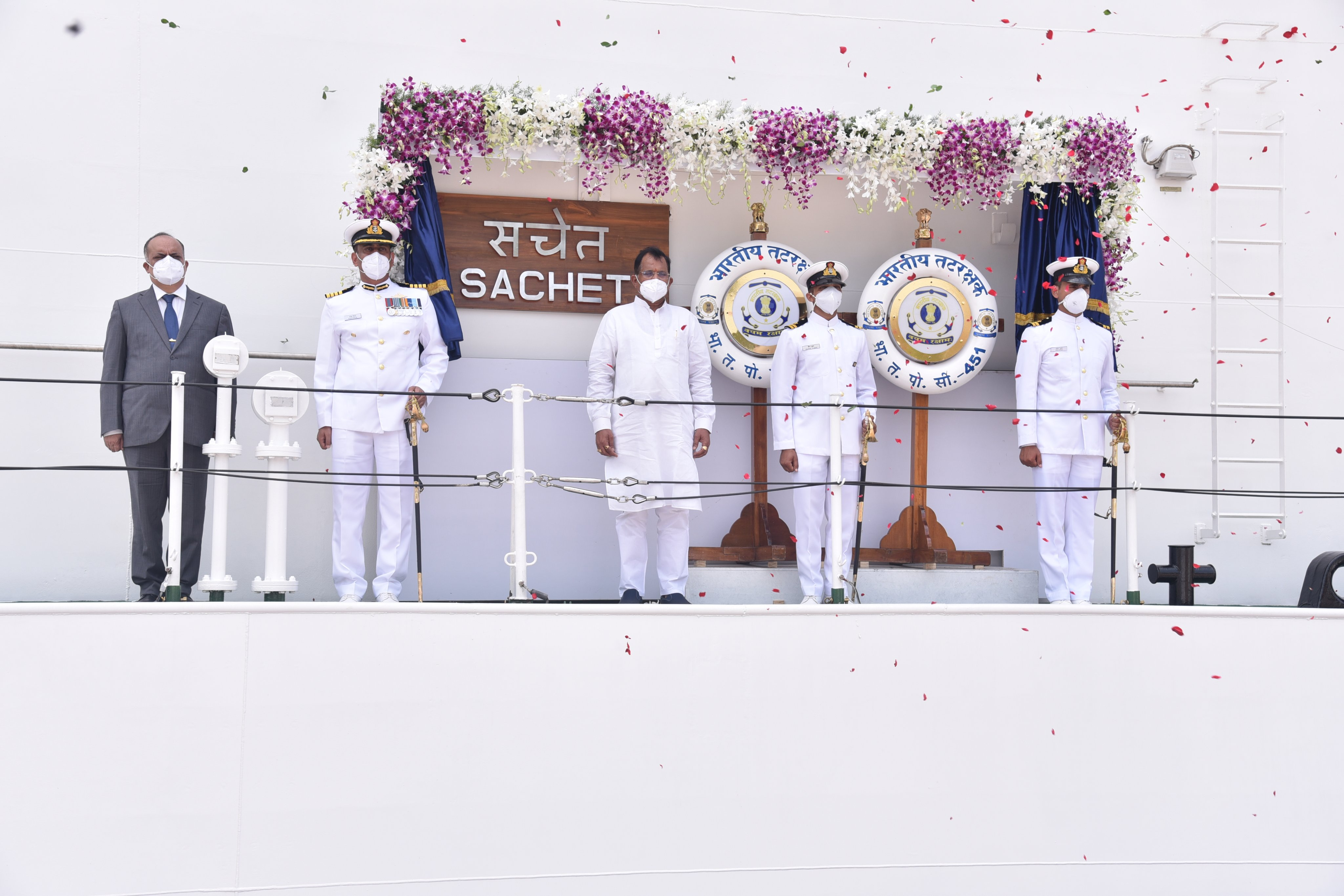
Commissioning of ICGS Sachet.

== See also ==
- ICGS Samarth
