= Marine Police =

Marine Police may refer to:

- Water police
- Cyprus Port and Marine Police
- Gujarat Marine Police
- Marine Region, also known as Marine Police, a branch of the Hong Kong Police Force
- Marine Police Force (a.k.a. Thames River Police)
- Vietnam Coast Guard
- Virginia Marine Police

== See also ==
- Royal Marines Police
