= Rajshree-class patrol vessel =

Patrol vessels of the Indian Coast Guard

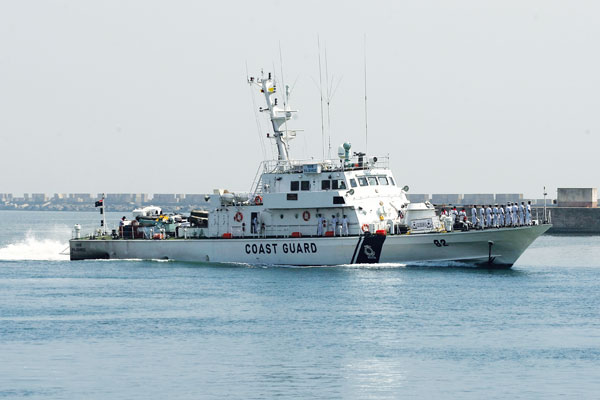
- ICGS Rajshree, first ship of the class

Class overview
- Name: Rajshree class
- Builders: Garden Reach Shipbuilders & Engineers, Kolkata, India
- Operators: Indian Coast Guard; Seychelles Coast Guard
- Preceded by: Rani Abbakka class
- Succeeded by: Aadesh class
- Built: 2010 — 2023
- In commission: 2012 — Present
- Planned: 14
- Completed: 14
- Active: 14

General characteristics
- Type: Inshore patrol vessel
- Displacement: 303 long tons (308 t)
- Length: 48.9 m (160 ft 5 in)
- Beam: 7.5 m (24 ft 7 in)
- Depth: 2.1 m (6 ft 11 in)
- Propulsion: 3 × MTU 16V4000 M90 4000 engines (2,720 bhp (2,028 kW) each); water jet propulsion
- Speed: 34 knots (63 km/h; 39 mph)
- Range: 1,500 nmi (2,800 km; 1,700 mi) at 16 kn (30 km/h; 18 mph)
- Complement: 6 officers and 34 sailors
- Armament: 1 x 30 mm (1.2 in) CRN 91 Naval Gun with SOP; 2 x 12.7mm HMG

The Rajshree-class patrol vessels are a series of eight inshore patrol vessels built by Garden Reach Shipbuilders & Engineers (GRSE), Kolkata for the Indian Coast Guard.

== Design ==
The Rajshree class have displacement of 303 tons and are 48.9 metres (160 ft) in length. They are fitted with an integrated bridge system (IBS), integrated machine control system (IMCS). The vessels are powered by three MTU 16V4000M90 series engines capable of generating 2,720 BHP at 2100 rpm each to propel the vessel at a speed of 31.5 knots using three 71S2 Rolls-Royce Kamewa water jet propulsion. At economical speed of 16 knots, they have a range of 1,500 nautical miles. The vessels also generates 320 kW of electric power to feed a wide array of on-board sensors and equipment. The vessels are also fitted with various terrestrial and satellite based communication systems including a Fleet-500 satellite communication system.

The ships are equipped with a 30 mm CRN 91 Naval Gun, which is gyro-stabilized with an electro-optical fire control system. They can undertake day and night patrolling for anti-smuggling, anti-poaching and fisheries monitoring in shallow waters. They also carry on board a high-speed fibre-reinforced plastic boat, two Gemini boats and one water scooter for search and rescue operations. They have fully air conditioned and modular accommodation for 6 officers and 34 sailors.

== Operational history ==
On the evening of 24 August 2024, ICGS Rajratan, in coordination with Maritime Rescue Coordination Sub Centre (MRCSC) Pipavav and an ICG Dornier 228, rescued 9 crew members of IFB Angel. The Fishing Boast was adrift 70 km south of Diu amid rough seas due to an engine failure. The boat was later towed to Jafarabad.

== Ships in class ==
The first vessel in the series ICGS Rajshree was commissioned by Director General Indian Coast Guard, Vice Admiral M.P. Muralidharan at GRSE Jetty on 15 February 2012. Firstly commanded by Commandant Pankaj Verma, an alumnus of the prestigious US Naval War College, Newport. The ship is named after an old Seaward class defense boat (SDB) of the Indian Navy INS Rajshree that served from 1983 to 2006.The second ship, ICGS Rajtarang, was commissioned at Chennai on 19 May 2012, and the third, ICGS Rajkiran, on 29 August 2012, at Visakhapatnam.

A follow-on order of 5 more ships will be built with deliveries starting by mid 2018.

Indian government gifted a Rajshree-class patrol vessel named PS Zoroaster to Seychelles Coast Guard. SCGS Zoroaster was refitted at GRSE in 2024 and returned to Seychelles along with INS Sunanya on 15 June 2024. GRSE was awarded the second refit contract worth ₹33 crore (US$3.4 million) for Zoroaster on 6 February 2026 by the Ministry of External Affairs. The contract was to be executed within three months. Following the completion of the refit, the vessel was escorted by INS Tarkash (F50) to her home port, Port Victoria, on 12 June 2026.

Yard No.	Name	Pennant No	Laid down	Launched	Commissioned	Homeport
Indian Coast Guard
Flight I
2072	Rajshree	82	27 September 2010	21 March 2011	15 February 2012	Chennai
2073	Rajtarang	83	—N/a	21 March 2011	19 May 2012	Chennai
2074	Rajkiran	84	March 2011	30 September 2011	29 August 2012	Haldia
2075	Rajkamal	85	March 2011	30 September 2011	8 January 2013	Port Blair
2076	Rajratan	86	March 2011	30 September 2011	11 February 2013	Porbandar
2077	Rajdoot	87	24 January 2012	6 August 2012	22 April 2013	Manglore
2078	Rajveer	88	24 January 2012	6 August 2012	9 August 2013	Visakhapatnam
2079	Rajdhwaj	89	24 January 2012	29 January 2013	12 December 2013	Kakinada
Flight II
2113	Priyadarshini	221	15 May 2017	30 December 2017	26 April 2019	Kakinada
2114	Annie Besant	223	11 August 2017	31 March 2018	12 January 2020	Chennai
2115	Amrit Kaur	225	30 October 2017	22 November 2018	12 January 2020	Chennai
2117	Kanaklata Barua	226	20 February 2018	10 August 2019	30 September 2020	Kolkata
2118	Kamala Devi	224	15 July 2021	2 May 2022	12 January 2023	Haldia
Seychelles Coast Guard
2116	Zoroaster	P609	30 October 2017	22 November 2018	8 April 2021	

== Gallery ==
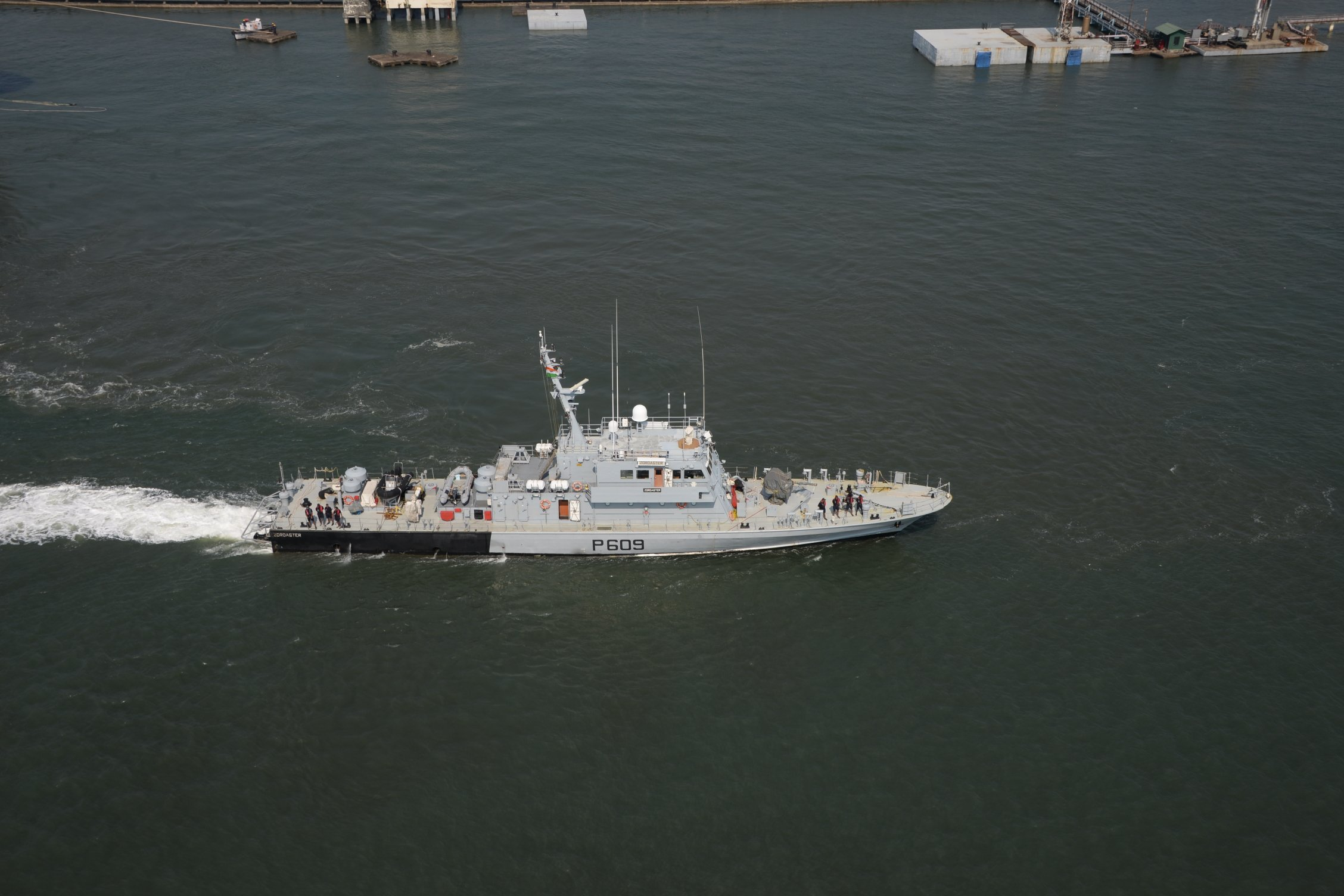
PS Zoroaster (P609) of Seychelles Coast Guard arriving at Kochi.

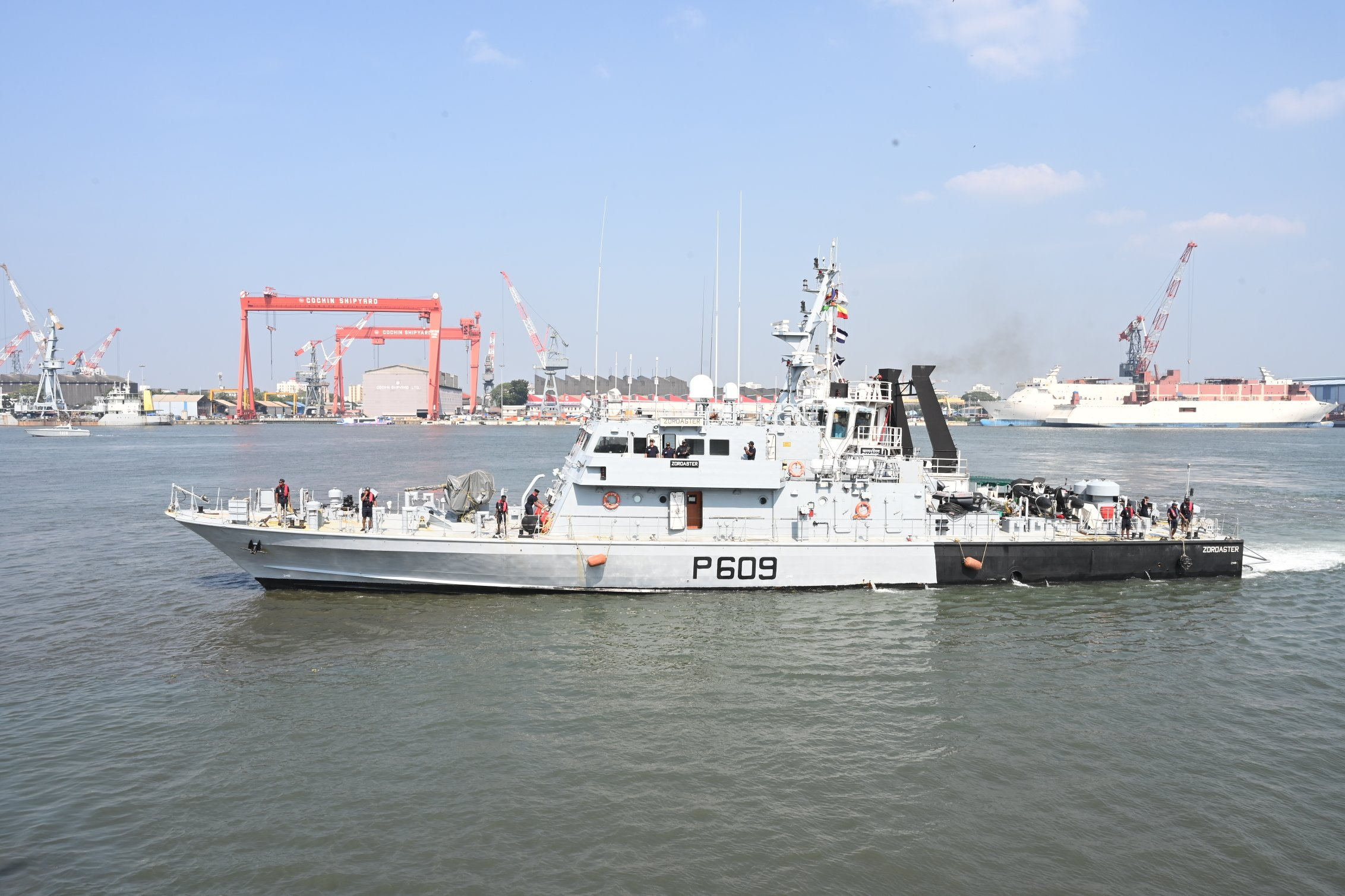
PS Zoroaster (P609) of Seychelles Coast Guard at Kochi.

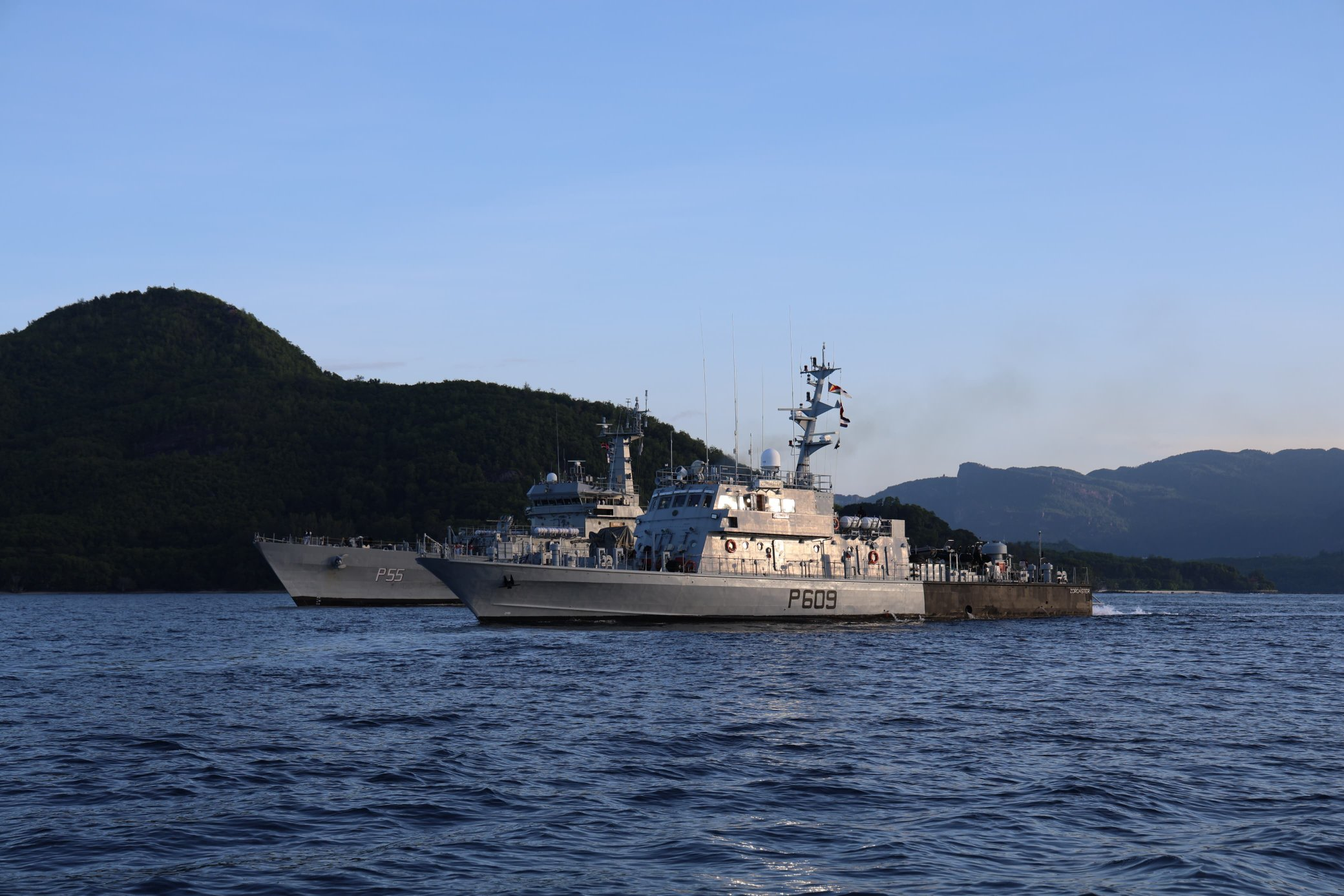
PS Zoroaster (P609) with INS Sharda (P55) arriving at Kochi.

== See also ==
- L&T Interceptor class fast attack craft
- Cochin Fast Patrol Vessels
- ABG fast interceptor craft
- Alcock Ashdown Survey Catamaran
- Rani Abbakka-class patrol vessel
