= Couach-class fast interceptor boats =

Indian navy patrol craft

Class overview
- Name: Couach fast interceptor boats
- Builders: Chantier Naval Couach, Gujan-Mestras, France
- Operators: Indian Navy
- In commission: July 2011–present
- Planned: 15
- Completed: 15
- Active: 15

General characteristics
- Class & type: Plascoa 1300 Fast Interceptor Boat
- Displacement: 12 long tons (12 t)
- Length: 13 m (42 ft 8 in)
- Beam: 3.8 m (12 ft 6 in)
- Draught: 0.9 m (2 ft 11 in)
- Propulsion: 2 × 800 hp (597 kW) MAN R6-800 engines
- Speed: 50 knots (93 km/h; 58 mph)
- Range: 200 nmi (370 km; 230 mi) at 20 kn (37 km/h; 23 mph)
- Complement: 4

Couach fast interceptor boats are patrol boats. Built by the French shipyard Chantier Naval Couach for the Indian Navy.

== Background ==
On 27 March 2010, in the wake of the 2008 Mumbai attacks, the Indian Navy placed an order worth around 600m rupees (US$13.2m) for 15 boats with Chantier Naval Couach, to improve their coastal security net.

== Vessel ==
The Couach fast interceptor boats are equipped with twin 800 hp (597 kW) MAN engines driving through a complete Twin Disc propulsion system consisting of MGX-5114A QuickShift transmissions, ASD11 Arneson Surface Drives with BCS trim tabs and EC300 electronic controls, and can achieve a top speed of 50 knots (93 km/h; 58 mph).

== Deployment ==
All 15 interceptor boats were inducted by the Indian Navy by the end of 2012. These boats will be utilised by various Indian Navy units to patrol and intercept suspicious vessels closed to vital domestic assets.

== See also ==
- Solas Marine Fast Interceptor Boat
- ABG Interceptor Class fast attack crafts
- Cochin Fast Patrol Vessels
- L&T fast interceptor craft
- Rajshree class inshore patrol vessel
- Rani Abbakka Class
- Alcock Ashdown Survey Catamaran
- Manoram class ferry
