= ICGS Rajdhwaj =

Indian patrol boat

ICGS Rajdhwaj (Note: "ICGS" is short for "Indian Coast Guard Ship") is a Rajshree-class inshore patrol vessel (Literally means Ruling Flag) (IPV), and the last in the series of eight IPVs designed and constructed by Garden Reach Shipbuilders Engineers, Kolkata for the Indian Coast Guard.

== Description ==
The ship is powered by three 71S2 Rolls-Royce Kamewa waterjets and three MTU 4000 series diesel engines rated at 2720 kW at 2100 rpm. The ship's maximum speed is 31.5 knots, and it has a maximum range of 1,500 nautical miles at 14 knots. The ship's electronics include an integrated bridge system and an integrated machinery control system. The main weapon is a 30-mm CRN-91 gun with a fire control system. The craft carries two gemini boats and a rigid inflatable boat for search and rescue and maritime patrol applications.

== Service history ==
Rajdhwaj was commissioned on 12 December 2013. It has a crew of six officers and thirty nine sailors, is currently commanded by Commandant (JG) Vivek Sharma and under the executive command of Deputy Commandant L Lupajao Singh. It is based at Kakinada under Coast Guard District Headquarters No. 6, Visakhapatnam.
