= ABG-class fast interceptor craft =

High-speed boats built for the Indian Coast Guard

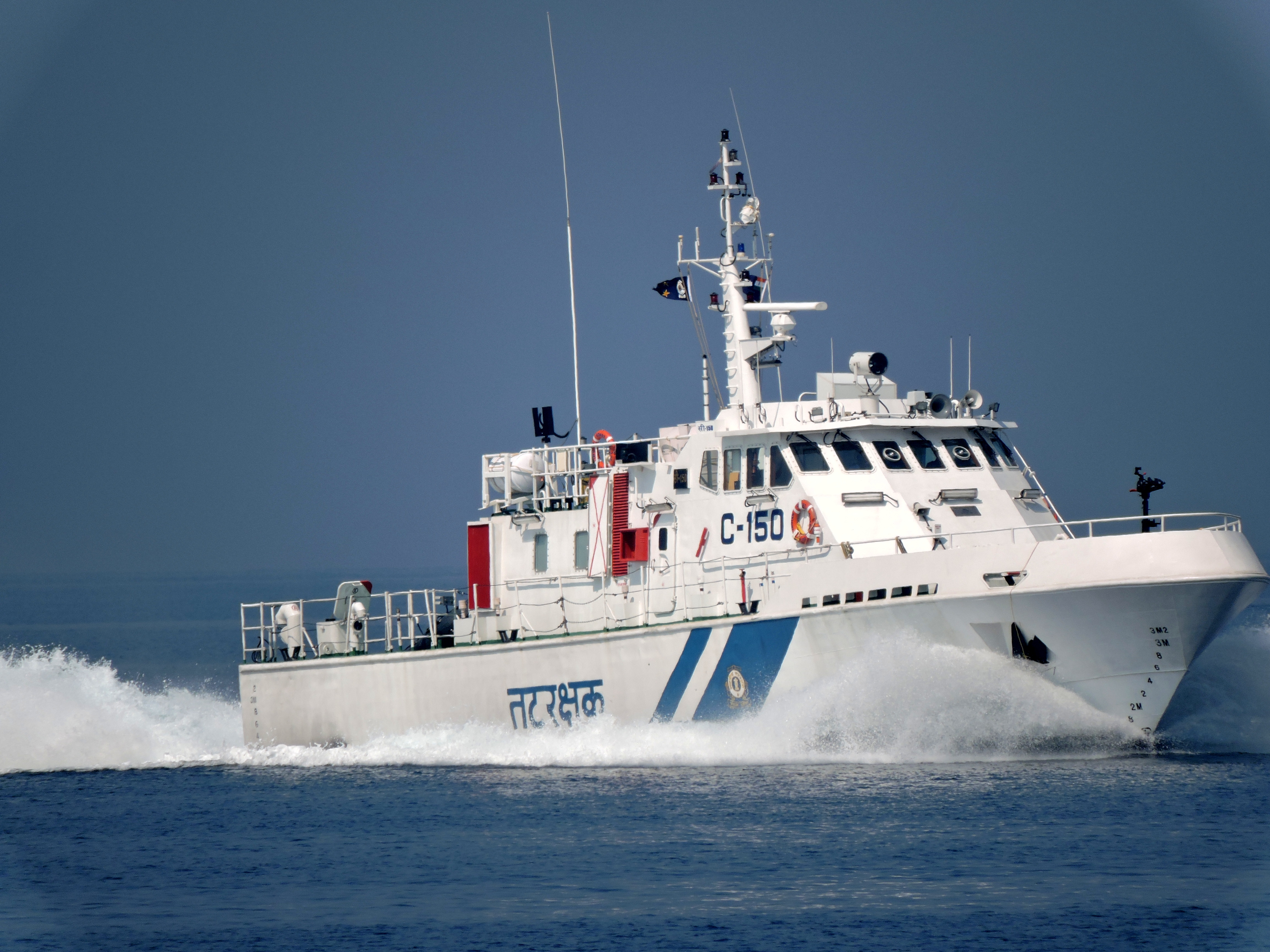
- ABG Fast Interceptor Craft C-150

Class overview
- Builders: ABG Shipyard
- Operators: Indian Coast Guard
- Cost: ₹194 crore (US $28,000,000)
- In commission: 2002-present
- Planned: 13
- Completed: 13
- Active: 13

General characteristics
- Type: Fast interceptor craft
- Tonnage: 60.6 t (100 long tons; 100 short tons) (standard); 60.6 t (100 long tons; 100 short tons) (full load)
- Length: 21.75 m (71.4 ft); 26 m (85 ft) (oa)
- Beam: 6.6 m (22 ft)
- Draught: 1.180 m (3 ft 10.5 in)
- Installed power: 2 x 2,040 kW
- Propulsion: 2 x Kamewa 63-S2 Waterjet
- Speed: 45 knots (83.3 km/h; 51.8 mph) (sprint); 35 knots (64.8 km/h; 40.3 mph) (cruising)
- Range: 500 nmi (930 km; 580 mi) at 25 knots (46 km/h; 29 mph)

ABG fast interceptor craft are a series of thirteen 26-metre (85 ft) high-speed interceptor boats designed and supplied in knocked down kits by Henderson based Global Marine Design (Headed by Gavin Mair) and assembled by ABG Shipyard, Surat for the Indian Coast Guard.

== Design ==
They are wide aluminum-hulled, water jet-propelled vessels for operations in close coastal and shallow waters. They have an endurance of 500 nautical miles (930 km; 580 mi) at 25 knots (46 km/h; 29 mph) and capable of doing high speed up to 45 knots (83 km/h; 52 mph). The ABG fast interceptors are fitted with a 12.7 mm "Prahari" Heavy Machine Gun (HMG). They have a crew of eleven enrolled personnel, with one officer and ten sailors.

== History ==
Initially two units were ordered by the Indian Coast Guard for evaluation during 1999–2000 at a cost of Rs 26.5 crore. The first unit (C-141) was launched in October 2000 and was delivered in 2001. The second unit (C-142) was delivered on 8 February 2002. They were commissioned at Porbandar and were extensively tested by the Coast Guard for ascertaining their speed and design specifications. The boats achieved the desired speed during trials. Thereafter a follow-on order was placed on 30 March 2006 for 11 boats. The cost price of each unit in the follow-on order was Rs 17.63 crore, aggregating to Rs 193.94 crore for the whole order.

=== Ships ===
Yard No.	IMO No.	Pennant No.	Commissioned	Homeport	Status
n/a	9217539	C-141	8 February 2002	Kakinada	Active
n/a	9217541	C-142	8 February 2002	Porbandar	Active
243	9502104	C-143	3 June 2009	Vizhinjam	Active
244	9502178	C-144	9 October 2009	Beypore	Active
245	9502180	C-145	16 April 2010	Mumbai	Active
246	9502192	C-146	16 April 2010	Port Blair	Active
247	9502207	C-147	28 May 2010	Port Blair	Active
248	9502219	C-148	1 October 2010	Haldia	Active
249	9502221	C-149	1 December 2010	Veraval	Active
250	9502245	C-150	28 March 2011	Vizhinjam	Active
251	9502257	C-151	28 March 2011	Kakinada	Active
253	9502269	C-152	18 June 2011	Okha	Active
254	9502271	C-153	22 October 2011	Veraval	Active

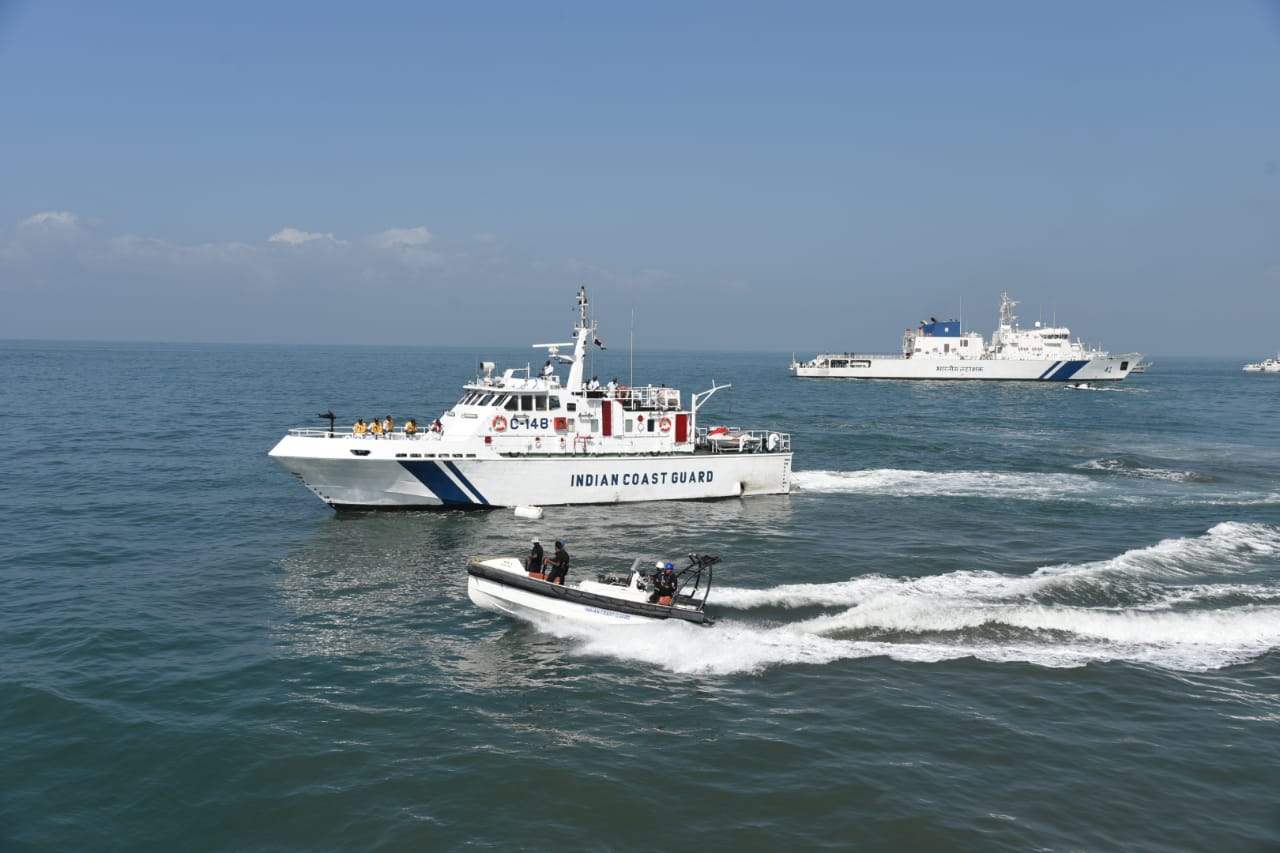
ABG-class fast interceptor with ICGS Varaha OPV during rescue exercise

== See also ==
- Solas Marine Fast Interceptor Boat
- L&T-class fast interceptor craft
- Couach fast interceptor boats
- Cochin Fast Patrol Vessels
- Alcock Ashdown Survey Catamaran
- Rajshree-class patrol vessel
- Rani Abbakka-class patrol vessel
- GSL-class offshore patrol vessel
