= Western India Shipyard =

Coordinates: 15.414°N 73.790°E

Western India Shipyard Limited.
- Type: Public Limited Company
- Traded as: BSE: 531217
- Industry: Shiprepair
- Founded: 1993
- Headquarters: Mormugao, India
- Key people: Cdr S.K MUTREJA (ceo)
- Services: Ship repair
- Website: wisl.co.in

Western India Shipyard Limited is a composite ship repair company based in Goa, India.

== History ==
Western India Shipyard Limited was registered in 1993 and has a dedicated composite ship repair yard at Mormugao Harbour at Goa under a 25-year licence agreement with the Mormugao Port Trust. It was taken over by ABG Shipyard Limited, a major shipbuilder with shipbuilding yards based at Dahej and Surat, by the acquisition of equity stake of 60%, The company is listed on the Bombay Stock Exchange BSE: 531217.

== Facilities ==
WISL has modern infrastructure like floating dry dock of 20000 TLC or 60000 DWT, 2 wet repair jetties of 180 metres, 2 outfitting berths. It has a water area of 50000 sq. metres in breakwaters and 31000 sq. metres of land area housing its office blocks and heavy workshops, paint shops and fabrication yards, DG sets and other allied plant and equipment. Its material handling arrangements include 2 heavy portal rail cranes of 35T and 50T, 2 EOTS, 4 dock cranes & 70T mobile crane. There are also storage/warehousing facilities of Central Warehousing Corporation (CWC) & Container Freight Station (CFS) at Verna, Goa.

== Products ==
WISL yard has ISO 9001:2008 Quality Certification for ship repairs issued by the Bureau Veritas.

Ship repairs consists of replacement of ageing steel plate, pipes and valves, refurbishment of crew accommodation, repair / replacement / renovation of deck side equipment, crane and tank covers, navigational equipment like propeller and rudder repairs, hull and tank repairs, surface coatings and rust prevention, air conditioning and communication systems, etc.

It caters to repair of passenger ship, tanker (ship), cargo ship, tranship, dredgers, fishing trawler, barge, Offshore support vessel, warships of Indian Navy and Coast Guard and oil rigs.

The company has repaired over 544 vessels and 13 deep water jack up oil rigs at its shipyard since 1996. The company has fared well for the financial year ended 31.03.2012 as per its annual report for 2011–12.
