= ABG Shipyard =

Ahmedabad-based shipbuilding company in India

ABG Shipyard Ltd.
- Formerly: Magdalla Shipyard Pvt. Ltd. (1985–1995); ABG Shipyard Pvt. Ltd. (1995–1995)
- Company type: Public company
- Traded as: BSE: 532682; NSE: ABGSHIP
- Industry: Shipbuilding
- Founded: 15 March 1985; 41 years ago
- Headquarters: Mumbai, Maharashtra, India
- Key people: Rishi Agarwal (Chairman); Ram Swaroop Nakra (Managing director); DP Gupta (Vice president); Subas Gantayat (Vice president)- Deepak Saxena (Head Commercial)
- Services: Ship design Ship building Ship repair
- Number of employees: 2000
- Divisions: 3
- Website: abgindia.com

ABG Shipyard Limited is a shipbuilding company headquartered in Mumbai, Maharashtra, India.

== History ==
ABG Shipyard Ltd is a part of the ABG Group of companies with diversified business interests. Established in 1985, as Magdalla Shipyard Pvt. Ltd., in May 1995 the company name was changed to ABG Shipyard Pvt. Ltd. after that the company went public and in June 1995 company name was changed to ABG Shipyard Ltd. it is headquartered in Mumbai. It has shipbuilding operations in Surat and Dahej in Gujarat. Following its acquisition of Western India Shipyard Limited in October 2010, it operates a ship repair unit in Goa which is the largest ship maintenance facility in India.

ABG became one of the largest private ship building companies in India with a capacity to manufacture vessels up to 20 tonnes in weight. In January 2019, a forensic audit by E&Y revealed that ABG had defrauded a 28-member consortium of bankers to the tune of Rs 22000 crores. Following this in November 2019, State bank of India petitioned CBI to conduct an investigation. CBI asked the bank to investigate at their level to check for involvement of bank insiders which was ruled out subsequently. Post this in September 2020 SBI filed a fresh complaint seeking investigation in to the role of public servants and other persons in the fraud. In February 2022, a look out circular was issued against the ABG former Chairman Rishi Agarwal and others in the case.

== Products ==
ABG Shipyard Ltd builds a range of commercial vessels. These include self-loading and self-discharging bulk carriers, container ships, floating cranes, split barges, anchor handling tugs, dynamic positioning ships, offshore supply vessels and diving support vessels.

ABG Shipyard Ltd was granted clearance from the Government of India to build warships and various other vessels for the Indian Navy. It was the second corporate shipyard to receive this licence after Pipavav Shipyard.

In 2004, it was awarded a contract to build pollution-control vessels for the Indian Coast Guard. In 2009, the Shipyard was selected to build 11 high-speed water jet propelled interceptors for the Coast Guard.

In June 2011, ABG Shipyard Ltd was awarded a ₹9.7 billion (US$100 million) deal to build two cadet training ships for the Indian Navy. In January 2012, it won an order of 5 billion order from Shipping Corporation of India taking its order book to about ₹200 billion (US$2.1 billion). In July 2017, the company agreed to file for insolvency.

== Bank Fraud ==
Despite having reputation and success in the ship building industry, in 2012 the finances of ABG started dwindling which was later discovered to be an embezzlement through a forensic audit conducted by E&Y initiated by SBI. During the audit it was alleged that the top management of the company was involved in diversion of funds causing criminal breach of trust with an intent to use the banks funds for personal gains possibly to tax havens. SBI stated that funds were used to pay other lenders and get letters of credit. Earlier in October 2016, Standard Chartered bank filed a criminal complaint with Economic Offences Wing in Maharashtra for cheating them of Rs 200 crore loan as they failed to repay the short-term loan they sought from the bank in April 2012.

== See also ==
- ABG Interceptor Class fast attack crafts
- ABG Class Pollution Control Vessel
- ABG Class Cadet Training Ship
- Pamba Auxiliary Vessel
