= Gujarat Marine Police =

Gujarat Marine Police was set up for peacetime patrol of the state's 1,600-kilometre-long (990 mi) coastline including coastal area and inshore sea due to the proximity to the Pakistan border as well as the presence of important structures like petroleum refinery. It has been envisaged as the first line of defence along Gujarat's coastline to patrol a radius of 10 km from the shore. Thereafter, the Indian Coast Guard is responsible for the 10–50-kilometre (6.2–31.1 mi) area, with the Indian Navy guarding the area beyond that. Currently, this area is secured by the Indian Coast Guard.

== History ==
Based on the recommendations of the Group of Ministers on ‘Reforming the National Security System’, the Coastal Security Scheme Phase-1 was approved by the Cabinet Committee on Security (CCS) in January 2005 for implementation over five years starting from 2005-06. Thereafter Gujarat Marine Police was inaugurated in November 2006 with the centre and the state sharing the cost on a 50:50 basis as per Coastal Security Scheme.

The first phase of Coastal Security Scheme consisting of setting up ten stations including those at Bhadreshwar (Bhuj), Bhatiya (Jamnagar), Harshadmata (Jamnagar), Bedi (Jamnagar), Nawabandar (Jamnagar) Bhavnagar (Bhavnagar), Somnath (Junagadh), Pipavav (Amreli), Porbandar(Porbandar), Hazira (Surat) 25 check posts, 46 outpost and the procurement of 30 boats GSL Interceptor Speed Boat have already been completed.

The Phase two consisting of expansion and strengthening with additional 31 patrol boats, 1,000 trained police officers (including 900 constabulary and 100 police officers) and 12 marine police stations is currently under progress as on 2012.

Presently personnel are drawn from police in state. The Indian Coast Guard provide training to them, usually of 15 days. This practice may be discontinued. In future Gujarat marine police may directly recruit specially trained personnel. A marine police academy is also being proposed for future recruitment.

== Gujarat Marine State Reserve Police ==
The Gujarat state is also raising a Gujarat Marine State Reserve Police (SRP) that will get into act in case of emergency, particularly when the Marine police is busy patrolling in the sea.

The eight groups of Marine SRP are going to be headed by a DIG rank officer, who will be holding a post of marine task force commander. He will be assisted by a superintendent of police whose post is marine sector commander followed by deputies called marine sector leaders. Below them are eight police inspectors, each heading the groups. Each group will consist of five units, which will be headed by an officer of police sub-inspector rank.

There will be 42 head constables and 276 constables working as marine commandos.

== See also ==
- Goa Shipyard Limited
