= Aadesh-class patrol vessel =

Class of Indian Coast Guard patrol vessels

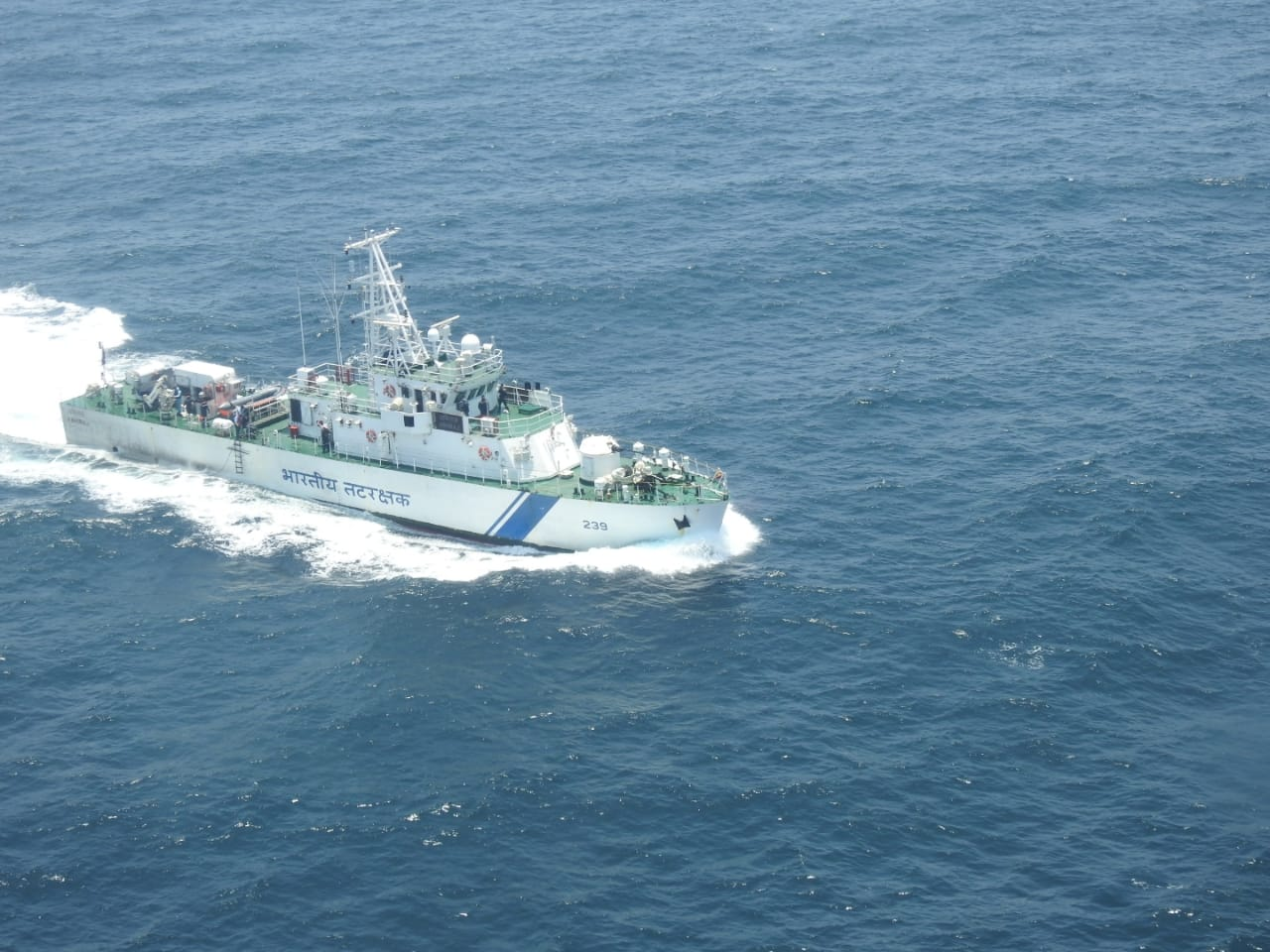
- ICGS Abheraj

Class overview
- Name: Aadesh class
- Builders: Cochin Shipyard Limited, Kochi, India
- Operators: Indian Coast Guard
- Preceded by: Rajshree class
- Succeeded by: Adamya class
- Built: 2010–2017
- In commission: 2013–present
- Planned: 20
- Completed: 20
- Active: 20

General characteristics
- Type: Fast patrol vessel
- Displacement: 298 long tons (303 t)
- Length: 50 m (164 ft 1 in)
- Beam: 7.6 m (24 ft 11 in)
- Draught: 1.63 m (5 ft 4 in)
- Depth: 4.65 m (15 ft 3 in)
- Propulsion: 3 × MTU 16V 4000 M90 engines; 2,720 kW (3,648 hp); 3 × 120 kW (161 hp) auxiliary engines; 3 × Rolls-Royce Kamewa 71S3np water jets
- Speed: Over 33 knots (61 km/h; 38 mph)
- Endurance: 1,500 nmi (2,800 km; 1,700 mi) at 14 kn (26 km/h; 16 mph)
- Boats & landing craft carried: 1 × 4.7 m (15 ft 5 in) rigid inflatable boat with 40 hp (30 kW) OBM; 1 × 6 person capacity Gemini Boat; LSA & FFA as per class requirement
- Complement: 6 officers and 34 sailors
- Sensors & processing systems: 1 × X-band radar with ARPA GMDSS 400 W MF/HF; ECDIS, UAIS, DGPS, Gyro, Autopilot; INMARSAT Fleet Broadband 500
- Armament: 1 × 30 mm (1.2 in) CRN 91 naval gun, small arms
- Notes: Classification: A1, AMS, HSC Government Service (Coastal service up to 250 nmi, 460 km, 290 mi from place of shelter); Reverse osmosis plant: 5 t per day; Oily water separator: 0.5 m3/h; Sanitary: Vacuum sanitary system; Deck crane: 1 t at 4.9 m; Anchor and capstan: 2 x SHHP/ electric capstan

Aadesh-class patrol vessels are a series of twenty fast patrol vessels (FPVs) built for the Indian Coast Guard by Cochin Shipyard Limited at its shipyard in Kochi, Kerala. The ships have been designed by M/s Smart Engineering & Design Solutions (SEDS), a naval architecture company based in Kakkanad near Kochi.

== Design ==
Aadesh-class vessels have a length of 50 metres (164 ft 1 in), a beam of 7.6 m (24 ft 11 in), and a draught of 1.6 m (5 ft 3 in) with a design speed of over 33 knots (61 km/h; 38 mph). They are powered by Rolls-Royce Power Systems-supplied triple type 16V 4000 M90 engines with an output of 2,720 kW (3,650 hp) at 2,100 rpm, coupled with ZF 7600 gearboxes and propelled by triple Rolls-Royce Kamewa 71S3NP water jets. This enables the vessels to operate in shallow waters and offers higher speeds and better maneuverability than conventional propellers. The MTU 'Callosum' ship automation system monitors the ship's services that also incorporates fire detection and extinguishing systems. The navigation package was supplied by Northrop Grumman and includes multi-function displays, electronic chart display and information system (ECDIS), autopilot, magnetic compass, and the NAVIGAT 3000 fiberoptic gyrocompass.

The vessels are equipped with a long-range gun and modern vessel control, navigation, and communication tools. They are capable of seven days' continuous deployment at sea without replenishing supplies. These FPVs are small in size when compared to other large vessels that Cochin Shipyard has built. Extensive use of aluminum in the superstructure was made to reduce weight, and Cochin Shipyard has developed special techniques to ensure high-quality welding and fabrication of aluminum structures. All the vessels delivered achieved speeds in excess of the contracted speed during sea trials and surpassed the expectations of the Indian Coast Guard with regard to the performance requirements.

The primary roles of the vessel include fisheries protection and monitoring, patrol within India's exclusive economic zone, coastal patrol, anti-smuggling, anti-piracy, and search and rescue operations. The vessels also have a secondary role of providing communication link and escorting convoys during hostilities and wartime.

== Construction ==
Aadesh, the first vessel of the series, was launched on 9 January 2013 by Jayasree Muralidharan, in the presence of her husband, Vice Admiral M P Muralidharan, Director General of the Indian Coast Guard. Aadesh was delivered to the Coast Guard after successful completion of all its trials on 25 September 2013. It has been operated from the Coast Guard station at Tuticorin in Tamil Nadu.

The second vessel, named Abheek, was launched by on 21 March 2013. For the launch, the FPV was placed on specially designed cradles and transported over the entire length of the Indigenous Aircraft Carrier (Vikrant) that was located at the building dock before being lowered into the waters.

The third vessel, Abhinav, was launched on 28 May 2013. The fourth vessel, Abhiraj, was launched on 30 September 2013 and was expected to join the Tuticorin ICG station. The fifth and sixth fast patrol vessels were launched on 2 December 2013 and were named Achook and Agrim in the launching ceremony. Achook was handed over to the Coast Guard on 28 March 2014.

== Operational history ==
On 4 April 2024, ICGS Amogh responded quickly to save the lives of 27 Bangladeshi fishermen who were stranded at sea on their fishing boat. On 4 April at approximately 11:30 a.m., crew aboard Amogh spotted the Bangladeshi fishing boat Sagar II drifting inside Indian seas while on patrol near the Indo-Bangladesh International Maritime Border Line (IMBL). The ICG ship dispatched a boarding team to look into it. It was discovered that the boat suffered a steering gear malfunction. There were 27 crew members and fisherman aboard Sagar II. The Coast Guard technical team, after an inspection, concluded the "completely damaged" rudder could not be repaired mid-sea. Meanwhile, the Bangladesh Coast Guard (BCG) was notified about the situation and the response plan by the Indian Coast Guard Regional Headquarters in Kolkata. The BCG dispatched BCGS Kamaruzzaman to tow Sagar II. At around 18:45 the same day, Kamaruzzaman approached the IMBL. The 27 Bangladeshi fishermen and their boat were turned over to Kamaruzzaman by Amogh.

On 17 July 2024, the Indian Coast Guard carried out a rescue operation of the Indian fishing boat Aashni. The boat with 11 crew and around 80 nautical miles (150 km; 92 mi) from Kochi, Kerala, faced heavy rain and challenging weather conditions. Due to loss of propulsion and flooding from a hull rupture close to the keel, the vessel was in a serious situation. A Dornier 228 surveillance aircraft of the ICG located the IFB on the night of 16 July 2024. ICGS Saksham, a Samarth-class offshore patrol vessel, was immediately diverted towards its location after receiving an order from the ICG District Headquarters No 4 (Kerala & Mahe). Eventually, ICGS Abhinav, an Aadesh-class patrol vessel, was also deployed along with a HAL Dhruv. The technical team from the ICG assisted in the de-flooding operations and rescued the crew members and recovered the distressed vessel. After the culmination of the operation, the boat was handed over to the Fisheries Department.

On 25 August 2024, the ICG rescued 11 crew members from the sinking merchant vessel MV ITT Puma. The ship was travelling from Kolkata to Port Blair when it sank 90 nautical miles (170 km; 100 mi) south of Sagar Island due to adverse weather and sea environment. The search and rescue operation was conducted in coordination by Amogh, ICGS Sarang (a Samar-class offshore patrol vessel) and an ICG Dornier 228 aircraft.

On 18 November 2024, ICGS Agrim rescued seven fishermen, whose boat fishing boat Kal Bhairav had been damaged and sank near the maritime boundary between India and Pakistan. The crew of the fishing boat had been interned aboard the Pakistan Maritime Security Agency vessel PMSS Nusrat. After Agrim intercepted Nusrat, an agreement was reached to turn over the crew of Kal Bhairav to the Indian Coast Guard. Agrim returned to Okha Port and all fishermen were reported to be in good health conditions.

== Ships in class ==
Yard Number	Name	Pennant Number	Launched	Commissioned	Home Port
501	Aadesh	236	9 January 2013	13 December 2013	Tuticorin
502	Abheek	237	21 March 2013	31 December 2013	Chennai
503	Abhinav	238	28 May 2013	15 January 2014	Kochi
504	Abheraj	239	30 September 2013	2 September 2014	Tuticorin
505	Achook	240	29 November 2013	7 June 2014	Mumbai
506	Agrim	241	29 November 2013	7 June 2014	Mumbai
507	Amal	242	-	18 July 2014	Goa
508	Amartya	243	29 March 2014	19 October 2014	New Mangalore
509	Ameya	244	5 June 2014	19 January 2015	Karaikal
510	Amogh	245	5 August 2014	19 January 2015	Paradip
511	Anagh	246	30 September 2014	29 March 2015	Chennai
512	Ankit	247	28 November 2014	14 May 2015	Porbandar
513	Anmol	248	17 January 2015	15 October 2015	Haldia
514	Apoorva	249	26 February 2015	21 September 2015	Goa
515	Arinjay	250	22 April 2015	12 October 2015	Okha-Gujarat
516	Arnvesh	251	10 June 2015	22 March 2016	Visakhapatnam
517	Arush	252	30 July 2015	26 May 2016	Porbandar
518	Aryaman	253	29 September 2015	21 November 2016	Kochi
519	Atulya	254	7 December 2015	21 November 2016	Visakhapatnam port change to Thoothukudi in mid April 2021.
520	Ayush	255	29 January 2016	18 February 2017	Krishnapatnam

== See also ==
- L&T-class fast interceptor craft
- Solas Marine fast interceptor boat
- ABG fast interceptor craft
- Couach fast interceptor boats
- Rajshree-class patrol vessel
- Manoram-class ferry
