= Manoram-class ferry =

Class overview
- Name: Manoram class
- Operators: Indian Navy
- Planned: 3
- Completed: 3
- Active: 3

General characteristics
- Type: Ferry
- Displacement: 578.146 tonnes
- Length: 62.1 m (203 ft 9 in)
- Beam: 9.41 m (30 ft 10 in)
- Draught: 1.9 m (6 ft 3 in)
- Propulsion: 1,044 kW (1,400 hp) Cummings India Ltd; 2 x 150 kW (200 hp) 415 V 50 Hz AC generator
- Speed: 15 knots (28 km/h; 17 mph)
- Capacity: 250 passengers

The Manoram-class ferry are series of watercraft built by Inland Marine Works Pvt Ltd Port Blair, at its Chanch Shipyard, Gujarat for Indian Navy. They are fully air-conditioned craft and are fitted with modern navigational aids and can ferry 250 passengers.

== Commission and deployment ==
- INS Manoram (IR Number: 39465): The first ship of the class was commissioned into the Indian Navy at Naval Dockyard (Mumbai) in presence of its Admiral Superintendent namely Rear Admiral AV Subhedar on 7 December 2011.
- INS Vihar (IR Number: 41298): The second ship of the class was also commissioned into the Indian Navy at Naval Dockyard, Mumbai in presence of its Admiral superintendent namely Rear Admiral AK Bahl on 9 September 2012.

External image
- Manoram class ferry
- INS Manoram induction

== See also ==
- GSL-class ferry
- Shalimar-class ferry
- Makar-class survey catamaran
