= L&T-class fast interceptor craft =

Fast interceptor craft

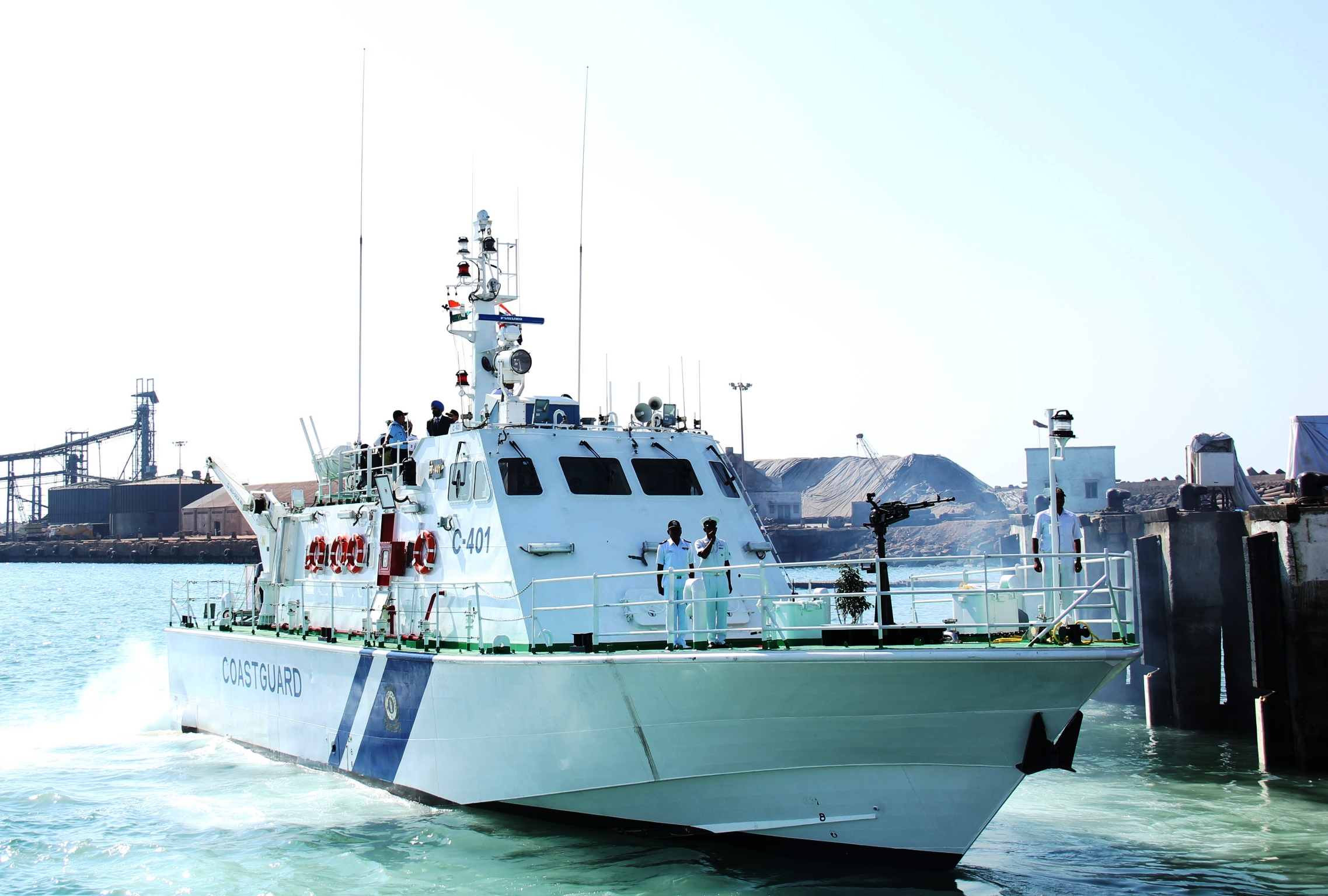
- C-401 after its commissioning

Class overview
- Name: L&T-class fast interceptor craft
- Builders: Larsen & Toubro
- Operators: Indian Coast Guard; Seychelles Coast Guard; Mozambique Naval Command
- Built: 2010–2020
- In commission: 2012–present
- Planned: 54
- Completed: 54
- Active: 54

General characteristics
- Type: Fast interceptor craft
- Displacement: 90 tonnes (89 long tons; 99 short tons)
- Length: 30 m (98 ft 5 in)
- Beam: 6.4m
- Propulsion: 2 × Caterpillar 3516C marine propulsion engines; 2 × C-4.4 auxiliary generator sets; 2 × MJP waterjets
- Speed: 45 knots (83 km/h; 52 mph)
- Range: 500NM
- Endurance: 24hr, logistically sustainable for 72hr
- Complement: 1 officer and 11 men
- Sensors & processing systems: MARIS ECDIS900 SmartLine Mk10

L&T fast interceptor craft are a series of high-speed interceptor boats being built by L&T Shipyard for the Indian Coast Guard. The ships are intended for patrol and rescue operations in India's Exclusive Economic Zone.

== Design ==
The interceptor boats are of planing-type, designed by the L&T Marine & Ship Design Division, an in-house facility of Larsen & Toubro Limited. They are 30 metres long with 90 tonnes displacement and can achieve a maximum speed of 45 knots. The interceptor boats has full aluminum-alloy hull for reduced weight and is powered by twin water-jet propulsion systems to enable quick response. The vessels are fitted with state-of-the-art navigation and communication equipment and medium-range armament. Each vessel is powered by two Caterpillar Marine Power Systems 3516C marine propulsion engines (2525 bkW @ 1800 rpm, 'D' Rating) and two C-4.4 auxiliary generator sets (86 eKW @ 1500 rpm). The water-jets for the high-speed interceptor boats are being supplied by MJP Waterjets. Delivery of the water-jets began in 2010 and will continue until 2013. They are also fitted with MARIS ECDIS900 SmartLine Mk10 Flat Panel Computer with radar kit.

The vessel's crew consists of one officer and eleven personnel and are designed to perform coastal surveillance, search and rescue, anti-smuggling and anti-poaching operations in close coast and can also operate effectively in shallow water.

== Orders ==
M/s L&T secured an order on 22 March 2010 for building 36 high speed interceptor boats for Rs 977 crores. It further secured an additional order on 22 January 2013 to produce 18 similar Interceptor boats for Rs 447 crore. The boats were constructed at L&T's existing shipyard at Hazira and at Kattupalli Shipyard near Ennore.

== Commission and deployment ==
ICGS C-401, the first of the series was commissioned at Porbandar by Air Marshal A.K. Gogoi, Air Officer, Commanding-in-Chief South Western Air Command on 20 December 2012. Its first deployment is at Mundra under the administrative and operational control of the Commander Coast Guard (North-West) region and commanded by Deputy Commandant Lakshya Sharma.

The second vessel of the class, C-402, was commissioned at Mumbai Naval Dockyard on 12 April 2013, followed by C-403 at Mundra on 11 August 2013, and C-404 at Beypore on 6 December 2013. The ICGS C-421 was commissioned on 21 September 2015 at Androth (L&M Islands) commanded by Deputy Commandant Rohit Kulkarni. The ICGS C-422 was commissioned at the Karaikal Port on 28 November. The vessel will patrol the coastal areas of Tamil Nadu, along the Bay of Bengal. C-405 was donated to the Seychelles Coast Guard in February 2016 and recommissioned as SCGS Hermes.

On 29 July 2019, the government of India donated two vessels of the class to Mozambique Navy.

All 36 boats ordered in the first batch were commissioned by January 2020.

C-449 was gifted to Seychelles in Feb 2025. It was Commissioned in Seychelles Coast Guard as PB Boudeuse

== Ships of Class ==
Pennant Number	Commissioned	Homeport
ICGS C-401	20 December 2012	Porbandar
ICGS C-402	12 April 2013	Ratnagiri
ICGS C-403	11 August 2013	Mundra
ICGS C-404	6 December 2013	Beypore
ICGS C-405	17 February 2014	Mumbai Donated to Seychelles Coast Guard
ICGS C-406	17 February 2014	Kavaratti
ICGS C-407	1 June 2014	Campbell Bay (Re-based from Thiruvananthapuram)
ICGS C-408	28 May 2014	Jakhau
ICGS C-409	15 November 2014	Porbandar
ICGS C-410	4 November 2014	Goa
ICGS C-411	15 November 2014	Okha
ICGS C-412	15 November 2014	Port Blair (re-based from Mandapam)
ICGS C-413	19 January 2015	Okha
ICGS C-414	19 January 2015	Port Blair (Re-based from Mandapam)
ICGS C-415	5 June 2015	Karaikal
ICGS C-416	5 June 2015	Port Blair (Re-based from Mandapam)
ICGS C-417	29 March 2015	Port Blair (Re-based from Chennai)
ICGS C-418	10 April 2015	Haldia
ICGS C-419	15 May 2015	Pipavav
ICGS C-420	15 May 2015	Karwar
ICGS C-421	21 September 2015	Androth
ICGS C-422	28 November 2015	Karaikal
ICGS C-423	13 April 2017	Krishnapatnam
ICGS C-424	25 April 2017	Haldia
ICGS C-425	28 April 2013	Paradip
ICGS C-426	1 October 2013	Paradip
ICGS C-427	6 November 2014	Vizhinjam
ICGS C-428	6 November 2014	Port Blair (Re-based from Karaikal)
ICGS C-429	6 November 2014	Vadinar
ICGS C-430	29 March 2015	Chennai
ICGS C-431	7 July 2017	Chennai
ICGS C-432	7 July 2017	Karaikal
ICGS C-433	20 September 2017	Murud Janjira
ICGS C-434	20 September 2017	Murud Janjira
ICGS C-435	2 December 2017	Karaikal
ICGS C-436	5 January 2018	Krishnapatnam
ICGS C-437	17 March 2018	Jakhau
ICGS C-438	25 April 2018	Kakinada
ICGS C-439	7 June 2018	Mumbai
ICGS C-440	14 June 2018	Chennai
ICGS C-441	24 April 2019	Vizhinjam
ICGS C-444	24 April 2019	Kavaratti
ICGS C-446	24 April 2019	Kavaratti
ICGS C-448	29 January 2020	Mangaluru
ICGS C-449	20 August 2020	Gifted to Seychelles in Feb 2025; Commissioned in Seychelles Coast Guard as PB Boudeuse
ICGS C-450	15 May 2020	
ICGS C-451	15 May 2020	
ICGS C-452	3 November 2020	Jaigarh
ICGS C-453	19 February 2021	Chennai
ICGS C-454	15 December 2020	

== See also ==
- List of active ships of the Indian Coast Guard
- ABG fast interceptor craft
- Aadesh-class patrol vessel
- Rajshree-class patrol vessel
- Samarth-class offshore patrol vessel
