= Solas Marine-class fast interceptor boats =

Indian navy patrol craft

Solas Marine fast interceptor boat
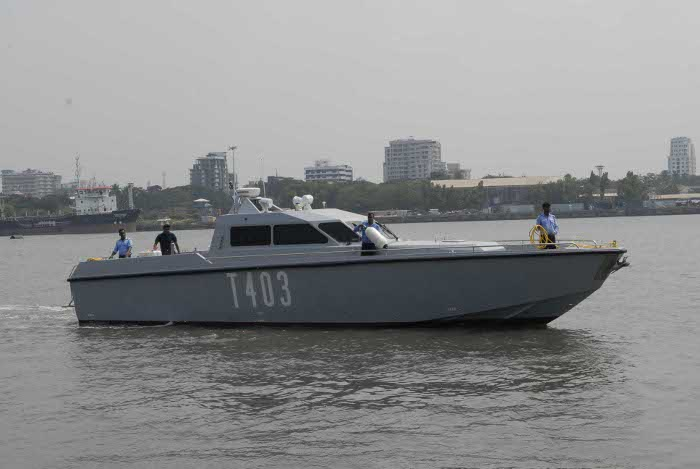
- Solas Marine interceptor craft T-403 underway

Class overview
- Builders: Solas Marine Lanka (Pvt) Ltd
- Operators: Indian Navy; Mozambique Navy
- In commission: 2013–present
- Planned: 80
- Completed: 80
- Active: 76 (Indian Navy); 4 (Mozambique Navy)

General characteristics
- Length: 16.33 m (53.6 ft) LOA; 13.3 m (44 ft) LWL
- Beam: 3.8 m (12 ft)
- Draught: 0.8 m (2 ft 7 in)
- Installed power: 2 × 873 hp (651 kW) engines
- Propulsion: Water Jets & Surface Drive
- Speed: 45 knots (83 km/h; 52 mph)
- Range: 200 nmi (370 km; 230 mi) at 15 knots (28 km/h; 17 mph)
- Complement: 4

Solas Marine fast interceptor boats (FIC) are vessels being built for the Indian Navy by a shipyard located along the Hamilton Canal at Wattala, near Colombo, owned by Solas Marine Lanka (Pvt) Ltd. Solas Marine Lanka (Pvt) Ltd is part of Dubai-based Solas Marine Services Group.

== Development history ==
The Indian ministry of defence (MOD) on 22 May 2009 sent out request for proposal (RfP) to 43 shipyards in India and other countries for 80 FICs. After the bids were submitted by the contenders, they were evaluated by the technical evaluation committee (TEC). Thereafter Sri Lankan shipyard Solas Marine was shortlisted for supply of the 80 boats. A deal worth ₹3 billion (US$31 million) for the same was signed in the last week of September 2011. As per the agreement, the 80 boats were to be supplied in batches of 15 and the induction of first batch was to take place within 36 months from the signing of the contract.

== Description ==
The Solas Marine interceptor boats are 16-metre (52 ft) long boats with beam of 3.8 metres (12 ft) and have draught of 0.8 metres (2 ft 7 in). They have deep–vee chine hull form with sharp water entry to ensure a soft ride in adverse sea states. The Vacuum infusion process have been used to build hull, which ensure significant strength gains, intrinsic to the technology. The vessels have excellent sea-keeping and dynamic stability capability at high speed in sea state 3 and is sea worthy up to sea state 4. The craft's model has been tested at Wolfson, UK. The upper deck canopy of each vessel is bullet proof and has air conditioned crew area to meet all crew comfort and safety measures. They are water-jet propelled with top speed of 45 knots (83 km/h; 52 mph) and have endurance of 200 nautical miles (370 km; 230 mi) at 12 knots (22 km/h; 14 mph). They are also fitted with night vision devices, communication equipment, automatic identification system (AIS) and radar, besides carrying a Long Range Acoustic Device (LRAD), a sonic weapon used for scaring pirates away. The vessels carry a crew of 4 and can carry a variety of armament from Heavy Machine Guns to Grenade Launchers. They are intended for intercepting suspicious boats for inspection and verification.

== Deployment ==
Out of 80 boats, 31 are based in Western Naval Command, 16 in Southern Naval Command, 33 in Eastern Naval Command. They are in services with navy's Sagar Prahari Bal for guarding naval assets and strategic installations from seaborne threats, harbour defence (primarily, protection of vessels inside the harbour area), and patrolling the seafront with state marine police forces. Additional units have been placed at Androth in the Lakshadweep Islands.

In 2022, two Solas Marine-class boats were transferred from Indian Navy to Mozambique Navy on board INS Kesari (L15). Mozambique Navy personnel were given training to operate the new interceptor boats. On 8 November 2024, INS Gharial (L23) transferred another 2 fast interceptor crafts of the class to the Mozambique Navy.

In January 2026, it was announced that BEL and Weapons and Electronics Systems Engineering Establishment (WESEE) of the Indian Navy has developed the Advanced Autonomous Navigation & Control Software (A2NCS) software suite for unmanned surface vessels (USVs). The software had been integrated onto an in-service fast interceptor boat and has already been deployed for mine countermeasure roles and combat exercises. The software-equipped boat can operate in three different modes: remote-controlled role, autonomous waypoint navigation mode and fully autonomous mode. The software is a network of integrated radar, AIS, EO/IR, INS, GPS as well as electronic navigation charts for situational awareness. The software has also received IRClass certification from the Indian Register of Shipping.

== Delivery ==
The FICs were to be delivered in batches, with each batch consisting of 04 FICs. As of January 2013, the first batch of FICs were undergoing trials in Sri Lanka. The delivery of the initial batch of FICs was scheduled for December 2012 and the following batch in April 2013. This was delayed at the manufacturer's end, pushing the delivery schedule by a few months. As of March 2013 first bath of four craft were delivered to southern command which were inducted by it on 20 March 2013 and Southern Naval Command was also scheduled to receive 12 more of these craft in the coming months. The FIC's were to be deployed in Ezhimala and in the islands of Kavaratti, Minicoy, and Androth.

As of 2017, all 20 batches have been delivered by the Shipyard with the last batch's delivery on 28 March 2017 against original schedule of 02 April 2017.

== See also ==
- List of active Indian Navy ships
