= 1st Training Squadron =

- Active: 1973-present
- Country: India
- Branch: Indian Navy
- Type: Training squadron
- Role: Afloat Training
- Part of: Southern Naval Command
- Garrison/HQ: Kochi
- Nickname: 1TS
- Motto: प्रशिक्षणम उत्कर्षस्य मूलम (Sanskrit) (Training is the bedrock of success)

Commanders
- Senior Officer 1TS: Captain Tijo K Joseph

The 1st Training Squadron, also known as 1TS, is a squadron of Training ships of the Indian Navy. 1TS imparts afloat training to cadets after they complete their basic training at the Indian Naval Academy. The squadron is based out of Kochi and is a part of the Southern Naval Command.

== History ==
Naval cadets began undergoing afloat training on Indian Naval ships starting with the 4th Naval course (1st Joint Services Wing course). After their time at JSW, the cadets joined INS Tir (K256) for six months, followed by another six months' training as Midshipmen. In 1955, INS Krishna (U46) was converted to a training role. Krishna became the Cadet Training ship while Tir became the Midshipman Training ship. Later the sloop INS Kaveri (U10) The Navy's first capital ship, the cruiser INS Delhi (C74) was converted into a training ship in May 1971.

In 1973, the 1st Training Squadron was formed with Delhi, Kaveri, Krishna and Tir with Delhi as the senior ship. The squadron trained the cadets and midshipmen of the Electrical, Engineering, Supply & Secretariat and Executive branches. After their training at the National Defence Academy and the Naval Academy in Cochin, the cadets joined Delhi for basic training in seamanship, navigation, electrical, engineering, communication and weaponry. In the second phase, the executive and supply & secretariat branch midshipmen would continue to be trained by the squadron while the electrical and engineering midshipmen would move to INS Valsura and INS Shivaji respectively for their specialisation and graduation.

With the decommissioning of Tir and Kaveri in 1977, Delhi in 1978 and Krishna in 1981, the anti-aircraft frigates INS Brahmaputra (F31), INS Beas (F137) and INS Betwa (F139) constituted the training squadron, with Brahmaputra as the senior ship. The first dedicated training ship INS Tir (A86) was commissioned in February 1986 and joined the squadron on 1 April as the senior ship. INS Krishna (F46) joined the squadron in 1995, while the sail training ships INS Tarangini (A75) and INS Sudarshini (A77) joined in 1997 and 2012 respectively.

== Units ==
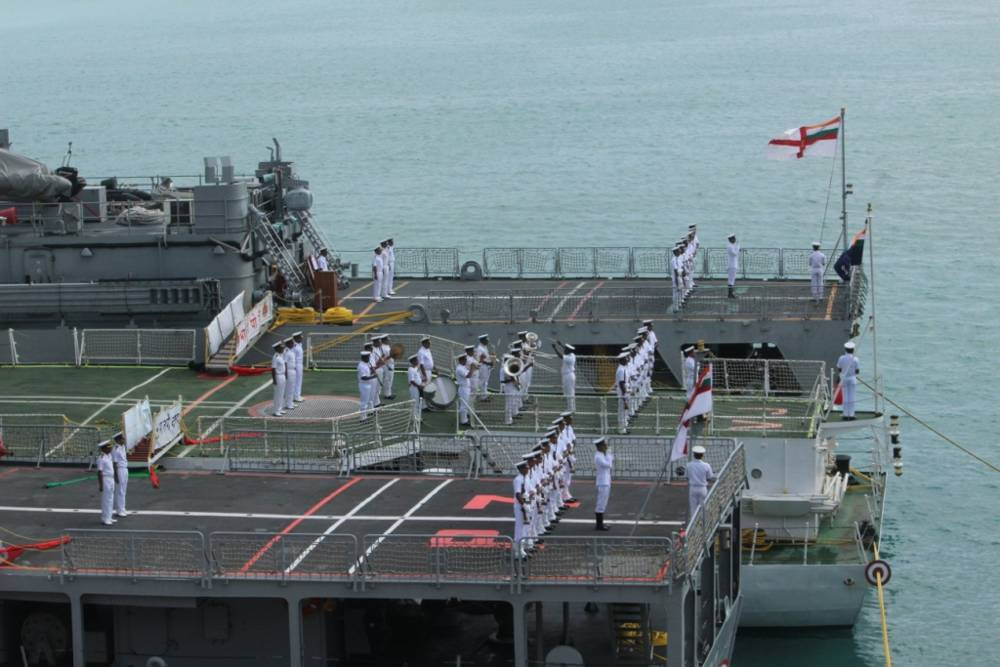
Ships of 1TS in Seychelles.

The current components of the squadron are:

- INS Tir (A86)
- INS Sujata (P56)
- INS Magar (L20)
- INS Shardul (L16)
- INS Tarangini (A75)
- INS Sudarshini (A77)
- ICGS Sarathi (14)
- ICGS Veera (35)

== Organisation ==
The squadron is headed by the senior officer, 1st Training Squadron, who is also the commanding officer of the senior ship INS Tir (A86). The squadron is a part of the training command of the Navy, the Southern Naval Command.

== Mission ==
The squadron consolidates the cadet's knowledge in service subjects and exposes them to the basics of life at sea. The squadron trains about 250 to 300 cadets every year. The squadron undertakes overseas deployment every year, calling on ports around the world.

== Deployment ==
=== 2024 ===
On 1 October 2024, Indian Navy's 1st Training Squadron (1TS), including INS Tir (A86), INS Shardul (L16) and ICGS Veera (35), reached Bandar Abbas, Iran for training purposes. The Indian flotilla was greeted by IRIS Zereh (P235) of the Islamic Republic of Iran Navy. The objective of the visit was enhancing maritime cooperation and interoperability. On 5 October, the 1st Training Squadron reached Muscat, Oman, the third time in the last decade. The flotilla was docked there until 9 October. On 12 October, Tir and Veera reached Port of Manama, Bahrain. On 12 October 2024, Shardul reached Port Rashid at Dubai, UAE. On 16 October, Shardul concluded her visit to Dubai with a Maritime Partnership Exercise with the United Arab Emirates Navy's Al Quwaisat.

=== 2025 ===
On 1 September 2025, INS Tir, INS Shardul and ICGS Sarathi (18), as part of the 1st Training Squadron (1TS), reached Port Victoria, Seychelles on a long-range deployment to the South Western Indian Ocean Region. The visit included professional interaction with the crew of ESPS Navarra (F85) of the Spanish Navy who also visited the country during the period. The squadron departed the port on 4 September. On 16 September, the squadron, led by Captain Tijo K Joseph and joined by INS Sujata (P56), reached Maputo, Mozambique, for a four-day visit. The visit included bilateral exercises with the Mozambique Navy as well as visit of 1TS trainees to various training establishments of the Mozambique Defence Forces. The visit will conclude with a PASSEX and joint surveillance of Mozambique EEZ. The squadron also visited La Réunion during the deployment. On 25 September, the ships called at the Mombasa, Kenya. On 28 September, the fleet departed and conducted PASSEX with KNS Shupavu (P3130) of the Kenya Navy.

=== 2026 ===
INS Tir, INS Shardul, INS Sujata and ICGS Sarathi were deployed on a long-range training deployment (LRTD) to the South East Asia to train officer cadets from 110th Integrated Officers’ Training Course (IOTC). As part of the deployment, the squadron would take port calls at Singapore, Indonesia and Thailand. The course includes six international officer trainees. The deployment will also include officers from the Indian Army and the Indian Air Force.

On 15 January, the squadron called at Changi Naval Base, Singapore. Meanwhile, 2026 the has been designated ASEAN–India Year of Maritime Cooperation 2026. The Navy held harbour activities with the Republic of Singapore Navy. The Senior Officer 1TS and Commanding Officers visited the Commander of Maritime Training and Doctrine Command (MTDC). The ships departed Singapore on 18 January.

On 20 January, the ships reached Port of Belawan, Indonesia. They departed the port on 23 January.

On 25 January, the ships reached Phuket Deep Sea Port, Phuket, Thailand. Indian Navy regularly conducts Exercise Ayutthaya and Indo–Thai Coordinated Patrol (CORPAT) with the Royal Thai Navy. India will also take over the chairmanship of Indian Ocean Naval Symposium from Thailand starting February 2026. The visit concluded on 28 January as the ships left the port along with HTMS Huahin for a Passage Exercise (PASSEX).

On 18 February, the ships also participated at the International Fleet Review 2026 held at Visakapatanam.

The squadron, except Shardul, called at Port Victoria, Seychelles from 12–15 October during which they conducted a Passage Exercise (PASSEX) with PS Andromache of the Seychelles Coast Guard. The three ships thereafter reached Port of Colombo, Sri Lanka on 26 October and departed the island nation on 29 October. During the visit, the ships conducted a PASSEX with SLNS Nandimithra (P701), a Sa'ar 4-class fast attack craft of the Sri Lanka Navy.

== See also ==
- Training Ships of the Indian Navy

== Sources ==
- Hiranandani, G.M. (1999), Transition to Triumph: History of the Indian Navy, 1965-1975, Spantech & Lancer, ISBN 978-1897829721
- Hiranandani, G M (2005), Transition to eminence : the Indian navy 1976-1990, Lancer Publishers, ISBN 978-8170622666
- Singh, Anup (2018), Blue Waters Ahoy!: The Indian Navy 2001-2010, HarperCollins Publishers India, ISBN 978-9353025526
- Babu, Dorai (2023), A Decade of Transformation: The Indian Navy 2011-2021, HarperCollins Publishers India, ISBN 978-9394407909
