= INS Tir (A86) =

Training ship of the Indian Navy

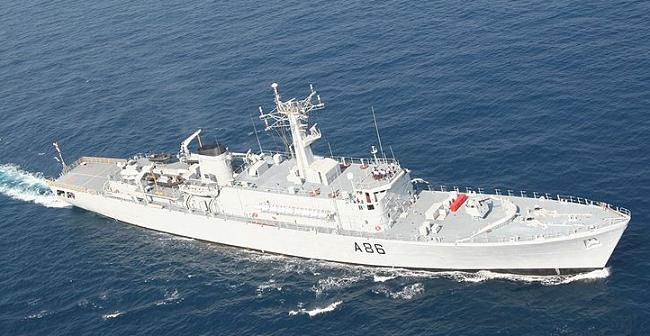
- INS Tir (A86)

History

India
- Name: INS Tir
- Namesake: "Arrow"
- Builder: Mazagon Dock Limited
- Commissioned: 21 February 1986
- Identification: IMO number: 8102191
- Status: Active

General characteristics
- Class & type: Tir-class training ship
- Displacement: 3,200 tons (full load)
- Length: 105.85 m (347.3 ft)
- Beam: 13.20 m (43.3 ft)
- Draught: 4.8 m (16 ft)
- Propulsion: 2 × shafts; 2 × 7,072 hp (5,274 kW) motors
- Speed: 18 knots (33 km/h; 21 mph)
- Range: 6,000 nautical miles (11,000 km; 6,900 mi) at 12 knots (22 km/h; 14 mph)
- Complement: 20 officers/staff; 120 officers/midshipmen
- Sensors & processing systems: Bharat/Racal Decca 1245 radar at I-band frequency
- Armament: CRN-91 30 mm autocannon; 2 Bofors 40 mm/60 (twin); Flare launchers; 4 × saluting guns
- Aircraft carried: Platform for 1 HAL Chetak or HAL Dhruv

INS Tir (A86) (Hindi: Arrow) is the first dedicated cadets training ship to be built by Mazagon Dock Limited and commissioned as such by the Indian Navy. She is the senior ship of the 1st Training Squadron of the Southern Naval Command.

INS Tir was commissioned on 21 February 1986. Sensors on board Tir include Decca Radar and a SATNAV (Satellite Navigation) system. She can carry up to 293 people on board, though her typical deployment is with 20 instructors and staff and 120 cadets.

INS Tir is named after HMIS Tir, a River-class frigate of the Royal Indian Navy, earlier transferred from the Royal Navy where she served in World War II as HMS Bann (K256).

== Operations ==
=== Anti-piracy ===
On the evening of 5 February 2011, INS Tir was on a training mission west of the Suheli Par atoll in the Lakshadweep archipelago. She was alerted by the Maritime Rescue Coordination Centre (MRCC), Mumbai about Somali pirate activity in the area to her west. INS Tir tracked the pirate skiffs to a hijacked Thai fishing trawler Prantalay 11 being used as a pirate mother ship.

INS Tir was then joined by ICGS Samar of the Indian Coast Guard. When the cadets on board Tir ordered the pirate ship to stop for inspection, they were fired upon. The cadets returned fire in which three pirates were injured, before the pirates raised a white flag and surrendered. 28 pirates were arrested, and the 24 crew of the fishing trawler were rescued unharmed.

=== 2024 ===
On 1 October 2024, Indian Navy's 1st Training Squadron (1TS), including INS Tir (A86), INS Shardul (L16) and ICGS Veera (35), reached Bandar Abbas, Iran for training purposes. The Indian flotilla was greeted by IRIS Zereh (P235) of the Islamic Republic of Iran Navy. The objective of the visit was enhancing maritime cooperation and interoperability. On 5 October, the 1st Training Squadron reached Muscat, Oman, the third time in the last decade. The flotilla was docked there until 9 October. On 12 October, Tir and Veera reached Port of Manama, Bahrain. On 12 October 2024, Shardul reached Port Rashid at Dubai, UAE. On 16 October, Shardul concluded her visit to Dubai with a Maritime Partnership Exercise with the United Arab Emirates Navy's Al Quwaisat.

INS Tir was awarded the Southern Naval Command's Afloat Award for the ship's operational readiness and combat efficiency.

=== 2025 ===
On 1 September 2025, INS Tir, INS Shardul and ICGS Sarathi (18), as part of the 1st Training Squadron (1TS), reached Port Victoria, Seychelles on a long-range deployment to the South Western Indian Ocean Region. The visit included professional interaction with the crew of ESPS Navarra (F85) of the Spanish Navy who also visited the country during the period. The squadron departed the port on 4 September. On 16 September, the squadron, led by Captain Tijo K Joseph and joined by INS Sujata (P56), reached Maputo, Mozambique, for a four-day visit. The visit included bilateral exercises with the Mozambique Navy as well as visit of 1TS trainees to various training establishments of the Mozambique Defence Forces. The visit will conclude with a PASSEX and joint surveillance of Mozambique EEZ. The squadron also visited La Réunion during the deployment. On 25 September, the ships called at the Mombasa, Kenya. On 28 September, the fleet departed and conducted PASSEX with KNS Shupavu (P3130) of the Kenya Navy.

=== 2026 ===
INS Tir, INS Shardul, INS Sujata and ICGS Sarathi were deployed on a long-range training deployment (LRTD) to the South East Asia to train officer cadets from 110th Integrated Officers’ Training Course (IOTC). As part of the deployment, the squadron would take port calls at Singapore, Indonesia and Thailand. The course includes six international officer trainees. The deployment will also include officers from the Indian Army and the Indian Air Force.

On 15 January, the squadron called at Changi Naval Base, Singapore. Meanwhile, 2026 the has been designated ASEAN–India Year of Maritime Cooperation 2026. The Navy held harbour activities with the Republic of Singapore Navy. The Senior Officer 1TS and Commanding Officers visited the Commander of Maritime Training and Doctrine Command (MTDC). The ships departed Singapore on 18 January.

On 20 January, the ships reached Port of Belawan, Indonesia. They departed the port on 23 January.

On 25 January, the ships reached Phuket Deep Sea Port, Phuket, Thailand. Indian Navy regularly conducts Exercise Ayutthaya and Indo–Thai Coordinated Patrol (CORPAT) with the Royal Thai Navy. India will also take over the chairmanship of Indian Ocean Naval Symposium from Thailand starting February 2026. The visit concluded on 28 January as the ships left the port along with HTMS Huahin for a Passage Exercise (PASSEX).

On 18 February, the ships also participated at the International Fleet Review 2026 held at Visakapatanam.

== See also ==
- Training ships of the Indian Navy
