= George Chapman (Dubai) =

George Chapman MBE OBE (1925–29 October 2023) was a key figure in the emergence of the United Arab Emirates city of Dubai as a regional and global logistics hub, a consultant to Sheikh Rashid bin Saeed Al Maktoum, Chairman of Port Rashid and formerly general manager of Gray Mackenzie in Dubai.

== Early life ==
Chapman was born in Falmouth in 1925 and took an active part in the Civil Defence and Home Guard before the outbreak of World War II. Joining the army, Chapman served in the Arakan and Northern Burma with the Devonshire Regiment attached to the Maratha Light Infantry.

Following demobilisation, Chapman joined the Falmouth Ship Agency but in 1950 travelled to Dubai, then a remote port on the coast of the Trucial States, to work for Gray Mackenzie, the licensed shipping agent in Dubai since 1891.

== Dubai career ==
Chapman's home in Dubai was to be on the first floor of the Mackenzie House, then also known as Bayt Al Wakeel (the house of the representative, or agent) - the name the house, originally constructed in 1935, still bears today as a heritage restaurant in the souq area of Dubai.

The ground floor of the house served as Gray Mackenzies' office. In 1951, Chapman placed a treadmill crane, the first in Dubai, to unload larger cargos onto the wharf at Dubai. The crane remains on the creekside today. Under Chapman, Gray Mackenzie was to form part of the Dubai Ports Committee, a key advisory body responsible for shaping John Harris' town plan for Dubai in 1959.

As an advisor to the ruler of Dubai in the 1950s, Chapman would frequently be called to Sheikh Rashid's majlis by Rashid's young son, Mohammed (now ruler of Dubai and Vice President and Prime Minister of the UAE), with the cry of 'Wakil, Sheikh Rashid wants to see you, please. Come, Wakil.'

In his role as general manager of Gray Mackenzie in Dubai, Chapman drove the company's growth and its subsequent transition to Maritime & Mercantile International (MMI) in 1983. He was responsible for the management of Port Rashid from its inception, initially running the port through Gray Mackenzie subsidiary Dubai Port Services.

Chapman served as chairman of Port Rashid from 1979, a development that was to play a transformational role in growing Dubai's position as a regional hub for trade and shipping. He also served as chairman of Ras Al Khaimah Ports Services in the 70s and a consultant to Sharjah Ports Authority until shortly before his death. He was also a consultant to the Rais Hassan Saadi Group for over two decades.

He was made a Member of the Order of the British Empire (MBE) while in Oman in 1959 and an Officer of the Order of the British Empire (OBE) in Dubai in 1978.

Chapman was a co-founder (with Bill Duff) of the first British school in the United Arab Emirates, Dubai English Speaking School (DESS) in 1963, based in a Nissen hut located in Dubai port and staffed by an RAF Flight Lieutenant, George Loughman. Together with Jack Briggs, Bill Duff and Arthur Jarman, Chapman also co-founded the Dubai International Seafarers Centre (DISC).

== Personal life ==
Chapman's wife Doreen died in 2017. He died 29 October 2023. They were survived by two daughters, Vanessa and Katherine.
