= Bill Duff (Arabist) =

British arabist, banker, and advisor (1922–2014)

William Duff
- Born: 13 May 1922; Singapore
- Died: 14 February 2014 (aged 91); Jumeirah, Dubai
- Resting place: Jumeirah; 25.21007°N 55.24896°E
- Other name: Bill Duff
- Occupations: Banker, arabist, civil administrator
- Known for: services in Dubai
- Spouse: Irenka Trachimovic
- Children: 2 daughters
- Parent(s): Robert Duff; Eleanor

William Duff (13 May 1922 – 14 February 2014) was a Scottish banker, Arabist and an advisor to the first vice-president and prime minister of the United Arab Emirates and a former ruler of Dubai, Rashid bin Saeed Al Maktoum. He is credited by many with helping to modernise the Emirate.

== Biography ==
William really played a key role in the growth of the UAE. The drive was all Sheikh Rashid. But around him were these loyal servants: whatever ideas were outlined, they made it happen, Anthony Harris, a former British Ambassador to the United Arab Emirates said about William Duff.

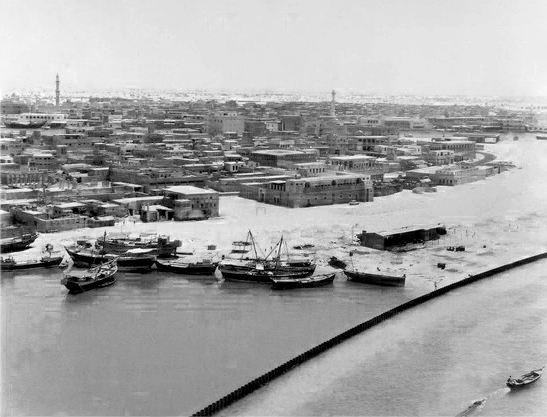
Al Ras Deira in mid 1960s

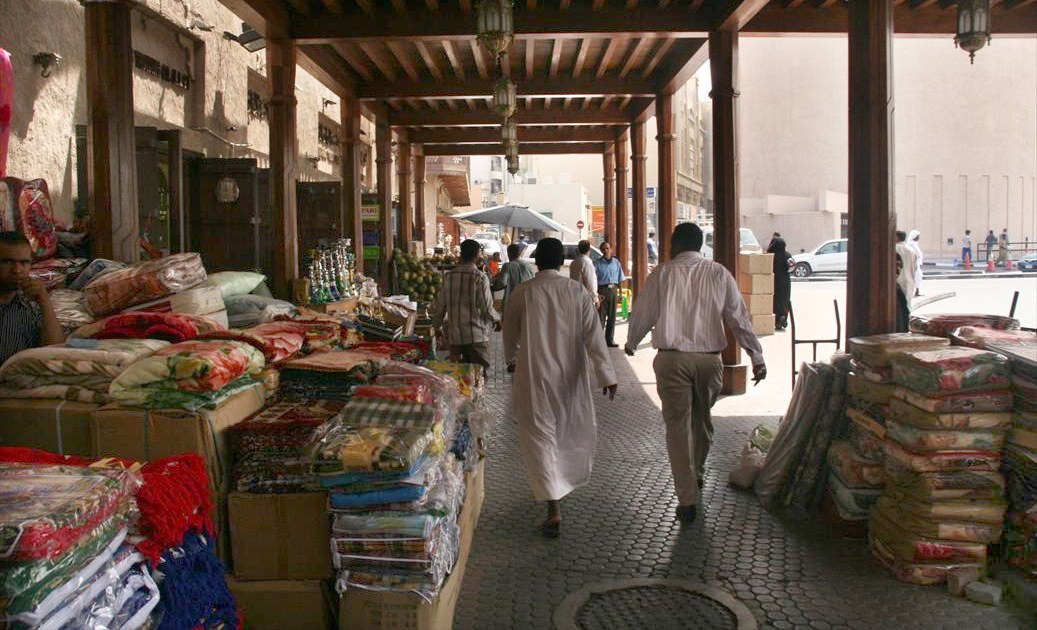
Deira Souk

William Duff (originally MacDuff which was later shortened to Duff) was born in Singapore on 13 May 1922 to Eleanor and Robert Duff who ran a business there. His education was at Cheltenham College and, later, at the Hertford College, University of Oxford, from where he secured a master's degree in Eastern Studies.

His father was incarcerated by the Japanese in Changi Prison until 1945, a British jail used by the Japanese as a prisoner of war camp after the fall of Singapore in 1942, Duff was drafted into the British Army and his first commission was at the 1st Battalion Princess Louise's Kensington Regiment. He was involved in the World War II, fighting in Italy, Sudan and Palestine. During his stay at Palestine, he is known to have developed an affinity for the Arab culture. It was there he met his future wife, Irenka Trachimovic, a Polish national, at a party at The British Embassy in 1946, whom he married the same year.

On his retirement from the Army as a Captain, Duff went back to Oxford University to read Arabic and, later, continued his Arabic studies at the Middle East Centre for Arab Studies, Shemlan, Lebanon. His civilian career started at the British Bank of Iran and the Middle East (which in 1952 became the British Bank of the Middle East), and worked for 10 years at various countries in the Middle East such as Iraq, Jordan, Lebanon, Syria, Sudan and, briefly, as an advisor to the ruling family of Kuwait.

Following a meeting between the two men in 1959, Sheikh Rashid invited Duff to Dubai, which was a part of the Trucial States during that time, to join as his financial advisor on 2 October 1960, and the friendship between the two saw Duff become a close and trusted advisor as Rashid embarked on the modernisation of Dubai.

In 1966, when oil was discovered in Dubai, the Emirate was exposed to sudden riches, and as the financial advisor to the ruler, Duff, who had signatorial powers, is reported to have imposed fiscal discipline in the Emirate and advised the ruler on major developmental programs. He helped put in place key infrastructure that underpinned the phenomenal growth of Dubai.

== Legacy ==
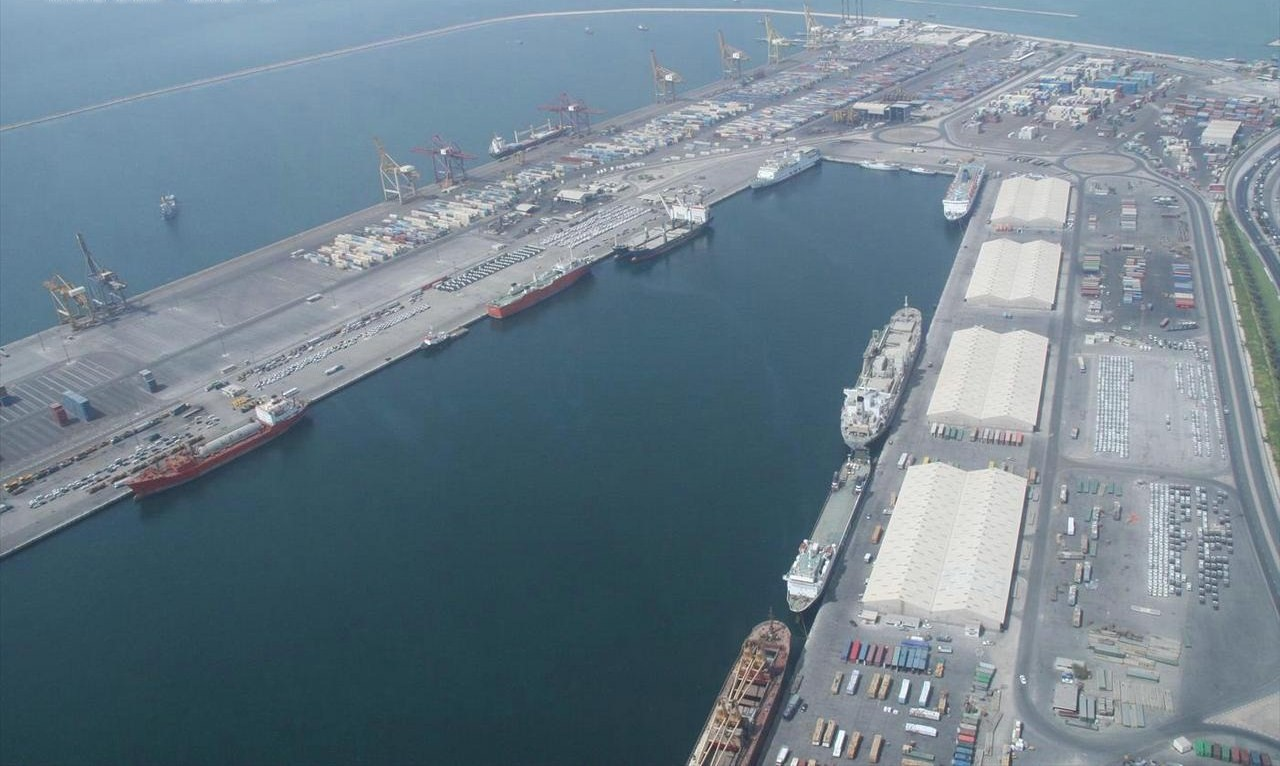
Port Rashid on 1 May 2007

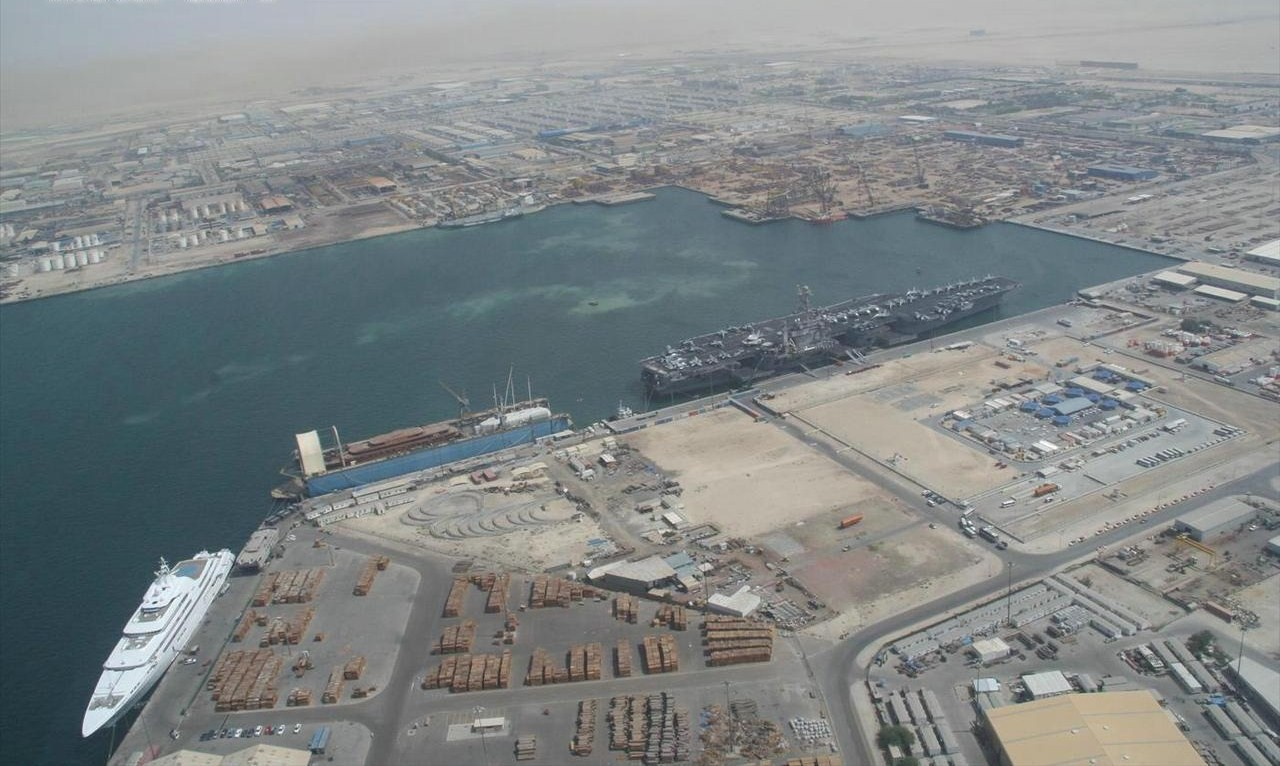
Port Jebel Ali on 1 May 2007

A speaker of classical Arabic, Duff's counsel was regularly sought by Sheikh Rashid and he was influential in pulling together resources and revenues that underpinned the rapid development of key national infrastructure. He is also credited with the establishment of a Seafarer's Mission, a kindergarten school, a Christian cemetery and Dubai English Speaking School, the first English curriculum school in Dubai which was run by his wife, Irenka, till a few years before Duff's death. His efforts were known in inviting foreign companies to invest in business in Dubai for which he is reported to have attempted to eliminate bribery from the administration.

Duff's involvement is reported in the establishment of Port Rashid, the first deep sea container port in the region as well as in the making of the Port of Jebel Ali in 1979, which has grown over the years to become the largest man made harbour and the 9th businesst container sea port in the world. Six years after the opening of Jebel Ali port, Duff assisted in the creation of Jebel Ali Free Zone in 1985 to supplement the activities of the port.

The creation of a Department of Finance is considered as one of Duff's principal contributions, a department he advised on till the death of Sheikh Rashid in 1990. His contributions are reported behind the establishment of the Customs Department to foster Dubai's trade with other countries. Duff is also known to have blocked an attempt by officials to channel the Emirates reserves to the Bank of Credit and Commerce International, which went bankrupt in 1991.

== Relationship with Sheikh Rashid bin Saeed Al Maktoum ==
Bill Duff is known to have had a close relationship with Sheikh Rashid bin Saeed Al Maktoum, ten years his elder. Duff and his family were frequent guests of the Al Maktoums in their travels in Scotland, staying at Gleneagles Hotel and often translating for Sheikh Rashid. The relationship was cited as the reason behind the donation of US$ 1.16 million the Dubai ruler made to the Exeter University for its library and later, for the Institute for Arab and Islamic Studies.

== Later years ==
After the death of Sheikh Rashid in 1990, Duff slowly withdrew from the Dubai administration and restricted himself to his role as an Honorary Advisor to the Ruler. He continued his life in Dubai where his wife, Irenka, managed the Dubai English Speaking School, the school he co-founded with George Chapman, till a few years before Duff's death. He died in his sleep on 14 February 2014 at his villa along the Jumeirah Beach, leaving Eleanor, his wife, Diana Barnardiston and Sheila Duff-Earles, his two daughters and four grandchildren, Michael, Andrew, Nicholas and Caroline. His mortal remains were laid to rest at the nearby Christian Cemetery in Jumeirah, which he helped establish.

== See also ==
- Rashid bin Saeed Al Maktoum
- Port of Jebel Ali
- Port Rashid
- Arabist
