= ICGS Veera =

Indian Vikram-class patrol vessels

History

India
- Name: Veera
- Owner: Indian Coast Guard
- Builder: Larsen & Toubro
- Commissioned: 15 April 2019

General characteristics
- Class & type: Vikram-class offshore patrol vessel
- Displacement: 1,180 tonnes
- Length: 98.2 m (322 ft 2 in)
- Beam: 14 m (45 ft 11 in)
- Draught: 3.6 m (11 ft 10 in)
- Installed power: 2 × MTU 20V8000M71L (9100KW each)
- Propulsion: 2 × propellers 12800 bhp
- Speed: 26 kn (48 km/h; 30 mph)
- Range: 5,000 nmi (9,300 km; 5,800 mi) at 16 kn (30 km/h; 18 mph)
- Complement: 12 officers and 91 sailors
- Sensors & processing systems: Radar : BEL make-1*Decca 1226 nav;BEL make-1*Decca 1230 nav
- Armament: 1 x 30 mm 2A42 gun; 2 x 12.7 mm MG
- Aircraft carried: HAL Chetak, ALH

ICGS Veera (Literally means Brave) is the third in a series of seven Vikram-class offshore patrol vessels built by L&T for the Indian Coast Guard, designed and constructed in India as part of Make in India concept of the Central government.

== Ship details ==
ICGS Veera, the third in the series of seven offshore patrol vessels built by L&T at its shipbuilding facility at Kattupalli in Chennai, was commissioned on 15 April 2019, at a ceremony held at Naval Jetty at the dockyard in Visakhapatnam. It enhances coastal security and is part of indigenisation and fleet augmentation under 'Make in India' programme.

The Indian Coast Guard, which was formed in 1978, has emerged as the fourth largest force in coastal security in the world.

Veera is equipped with the state-of-the-art machinery comprising an integrated bridge system, which includes advanced navigation and communication technology and integrated platform management system.

A ship of the same name, of an older Vikram class, was decommissioned in 2013.

== Service history ==
On 5 April 2024, ICGS Veera rescued nine fishermen of Indian fishing boat (IFB) Durga Bhavani when the latter one caught fire due to Gas cylinder explosion about 65 miles away from Visakhapatnam coast. The fishermen were rescued off Andhra Pradesh Coast and were provided first aid to those who were severely injured.

On 1 October 2024, Indian Navy's 1st Training Squadron (1TS), including INS Tir (A86), INS Shardul (L16) and ICGS Veera (35), reached Bandar Abbas, Iran for training purposes. The Indian flotilla was greeted by IRIS Zereh (P235) of the Islamic Republic of Iran Navy. The objective of the visit was enhancing maritime cooperation and interoperability. On 5 October, the 1st Training Squadron reached Muscat, Oman, the third time in the last decade. The flotilla was docked there until 9 October. On 12 October, Tir and Veera reached Port of Manama, Bahrain. On 12 October 2024, Shardul reached Port Rashid at Dubai, UAE. On 16 October, Shardul concluded her visit to Dubai with a Maritime Partnership Exercise with the United Arab Emirates Navy's Al Quwaisat.

She participated at the International Fleet Review 2026 held near Visakapatanam.

== See also ==
- Jija Bai-class patrol vessel
- Tara Bai-class patrol vessel
- Priyadarshini-class patrol vessel
- Sarojini Naidu-class patrol vessel
