= Vikram-class patrol vessel =

Vikram-class patrol vessel may refer to:

- Vikram-class patrol vessel (1983), the offshore patrol vessel built for the Indian Coast Guard since 1980s
- Vikram-class patrol vessel (2017), the offshore patrol vessel used by the Indian Coast Guard since 2018
