= Jack Briggs (policeman) =

British police officer (1920–2006)

Jack Briggs OBE (1920–2006) was a soldier, Arabist and police officer who served as Dubai's chief of police from 1965-1974 and defined the city's modern police force.

== Early life ==
Briggs was born in London but grew up in the Lancashire town of Accrington. Leaving school at 14 to become an apprentice printer, he enlisted and joined the Scots Guards. Transferring to the Palestine Police Force, Briggs learned Arabic and quickly gained fluency, later taking a degree in Arabic by correspondence from the School of Oriental and African Studies in London. He was to become an examiner for Arabic for the international baccalaureate.

Following the end of the British Mandate in Palestine in 1948, Briggs joined the Bahrain police before moving to Qatar to become deputy commander of police there with the rank of Major.

The decision to add a police wing to the Trucial Oman Scouts (TOS), the British paramilitary force in the Trucial States, saw Briggs recruited to head the proposed new body. It was Briggs' belief that a mobile unit on TOS lines would not work effectively and that policing the five Northern Emirates would be best accomplished by having permanent police stations in the towns (Sharjah, Ajman, Umm Al Quwain, Ras Al Khaimah and Fujairah).

In the Summer of 1963, Briggs travelled widely in the area, meeting with each of the Trucial rulers, but meeting resistance to the idea of a British backed police force - particularly from Sheikh Saqr bin Sultan Al Qasimi, an ardent Arab Nationalist, who was of the view that the TOS existed purely to protect British oil interests. Saqr's nationalism would eventually result in his removal as ruler of Sharjah. In view of this resistance to the idea, it was shelved.

== Dubai Police ==
Briggs was initially recommended to replace Bahrain's commandant of police, Robert Hugh Winder, however he accepted an offer in 1965 from Sheikh Rashid bin Saeed Al Maktoum to command the Dubai Police, taking over from Peter George Lorimer.

On Rashid's instructions, Briggs expanded the Dubai police force from 350 to 600 men, adding a mobile anti-riot and security wing in 1967. Briggs worked closely with Sheikh Rashid and also later with the young Sheikh Mohammed bin Rashid, to whom he reported when Mohammed was placed in charge of Dubai Police in 1969 and whom he counted as a personal friend.

During his time at Dubai Police, Briggs insisted on all professional communication being in Arabic, which has been cited as a factor in the smooth transition from British to local administration of Dubai Police, with the accession of Abdullah Khalfan Belhoul following Briggs' retirement as the last British commandant of the force.

Briggs' advice on the prevailing trend towards Arabisation, particularly in light of Sheikh Zayed bin Sultan Al Nahyan's desire to replace British officers in the Abu Dhabi Defence Force with Pakistani and Jordanian officers, was to hasten Union Defence Force commander Freddie De Butts' move to 'Arabise' the UDF. Although this view of the need for immediate Arabisation was not shared by the Maktoums, Briggs tendered his resignation in mid-1974 following growing unrest among his officers regarding the suitability of a British commandant of police. The move was characterised by British ambassador at the time, DJ McCarthy, as the ‘beginning of the end of an era’.

On his subsequent retirement, Briggs remained an adviser to Sheikh Rashid and inspector general of Dubai Police. Stepping down from that role, Briggs retained a 'grace and favour' house in Dubai and, as a close advisor, continued to be consulted by Sheikh Rashid.

== Civic role ==
A trusted advisor to Sheikh Rashid, Briggs was frequently called to meetings with the Trucial States rulers and British administrators on serious matters because of his Arabic language skills.

In 1963, Briggs guided a meeting between Sheikh Rashid and the visionary bishop, Reverend Father Eugenio Mattioli, during Mattioli's visit to Dubai, which was to lead to the establishment of St. Mary's Catholic Church, Dubai. In 1965, supervised by Reverend Father Eusebius Daveri, the building of St. Mary’s began in Oud Metha, with the foundation stone of the church laid by Sheikh Rashid himself on March 25, 1966.

Briggs, together with Bill Duff and George Chapman, was also responsible for setting up the Dubai International Seafarers Centre (DISC) in 1972.

== Personal life ==
Briggs married Catherine Laverty, with whom he had four children, in 1953. He was a keen and pioneering competitive cyclist and, in fact, died in the saddle. He produced many Arabic translations of literary works, including Mohammed Al Murr's celebrated 1994 short story collection, The Wink of the Mona Lisa.
