= 5th Armoured Regiment (India) =

Indian Army regiment

5 Armoured Regiment
- Active: 1983 – present
- Country: Republic of India
- Allegiance: India
- Branch: Indian Army
- Type: Cavalry
- Size: Regiment
- Mottos: निस्चय और विजय; Nischay aur Vijay (Determination and Victory)
- Colors: Satin Blue, White and Black
- Equipment: T-90

Commanders
- Colonel of the Regiment: Lieutenant General Rajesh Pushkar

Insignia
- Abbreviation: 5 Armd Regt

5 Armoured Regiment is part of the Armoured Corps of the Indian Army.

Trekking Expedition team to Pangarchulla peak, Uttarakhand, October 2021
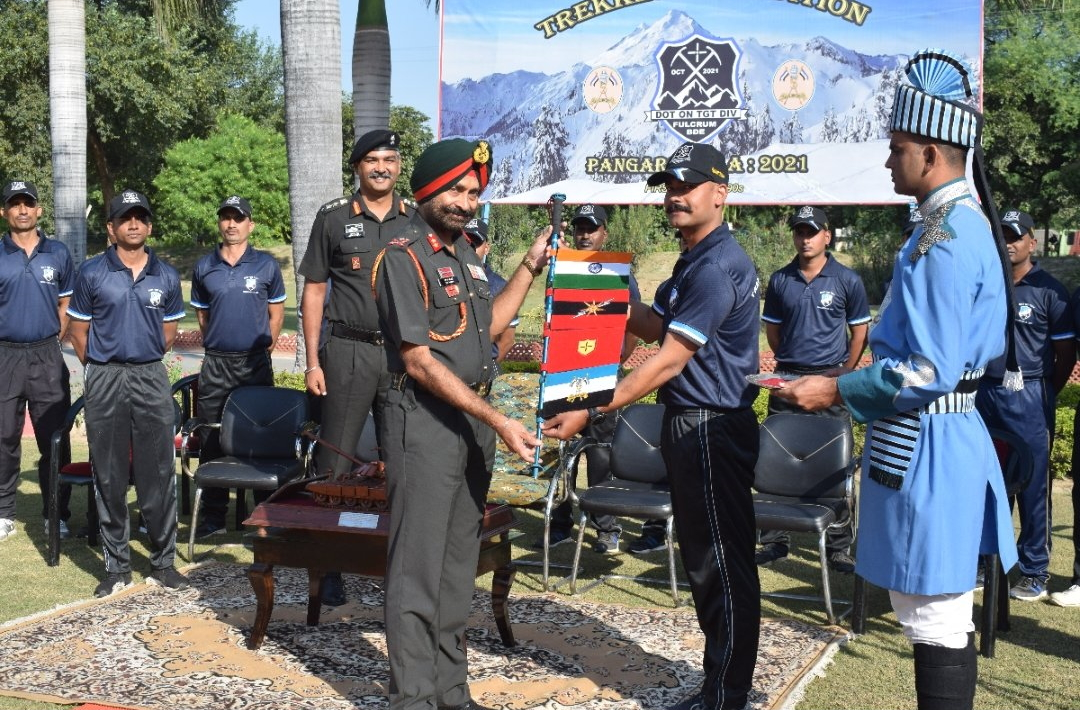

== History ==
5 Armoured Regiment was raised on 1 December, 1983 at Jodhpur, Rajasthan. The first commanding officer of the regiment was Lieutenant Colonel J.P.S. Hanspal.

The Regiment was initially equipped with Vijayanta tanks. It became the first regiment of the Indian Army to be equipped with T-90 tanks in 2002. It is also affiliated to INS Shardul, an amphibious ship of the Indian Navy.

The first Colonel of the Regiment was Lieutenant General M. Mayadas. Other Colonels have been Lieutenant General MS Shergill, Major General G.S. Malhi and Lieutenant General AK Singh. The regiment celebrated its silver jubilee in 2008.

On 27 November, 2011, the regiment was awarded the ‘President’s Standards’ by Mrs Pratibha Patil, then President of India in Patiala. 5 Armoured Regiment along with 70, 73, 74 Armoured Regiments and 6 Lancers of the 1 Armoured Division were presented the colours.

== Operations ==
The regiment has participated in Operation Trident, Operation Vijay and Operation Parakram.

== Regimental Insignia ==
The cap badge consists of a pair of crossed lances with pennons in the Regimental Colours. The numeral 5 topped by a mailed fist rests on the crossing point of the lances. A scroll in Devanagari at the bottom has the regimental motto निस्चय और विजय (Nischay aur Vijay, Determination and Victory). The shoulder title plain numeral 5 in brass on a black quadrilateral metal backing.

The Regimental Colours are Satin Blue, White and Black symbolising Compassion, Purity & Tranquility and Strength of Steel respectively.
