= Trucial Oman Scouts =

Former paramilitary force

The Trucial Oman Scouts (Arabic: كشافة ساحل عمان), known as Trucial Oman Levies prior to 1956, was a predecessor paramilitary force that operated in the Trucial States under British control from 1951 to 1971, after which they were renamed to the Union Defence Force with the formation of the United Arab Emirates in 1971. In 1976, the force was restructured and is now known as the United Arab Emirates Armed Forces.

The Trucial Oman Scouts were an impartial gendarmerie and were regarded as well trained, well paid, and efficient.

== Trucial Oman Levies ==
The Trucial Oman Scouts were established at Sharjah, in a location adjacent to the RAF base, originally as the Trucial Oman Levies (TOL) in 1951, but renamed in 1956 by Chief of the Imperial General Staff (CIGS), Field Marshal Templar. Substituting the word 'scout' for 'levies' was done to eliminate the impression that the force was conscripted, as well as to make the force sound more exotic and alluring.

The duties of the TOL as of 1951 were to (1) maintain peace and good order on the Trucial States; (2) prevent or suppress any traffic of slaves (but not slavery in the Trucial states itself as this was considered an 'internal affair' by the British); and (3) provide an escort for any British political representative traveling in the Trucial States. Their duties were later expanded to include helping maintain law and order and preventing internal tribal conflicts from interfering with the work of oil companies seeking to explore for oil under concessions agreed with the Rulers. The Rulers of the Trucial States were not consulted regarding the formation or establishment of the force and only the Ruler of Sharjah, who rented out the base to be used by the Levies on a 10-year lease, was informed of their establishment.

The force was founded following consultation between the British Foreign Office and Brigadier John Bagot Glubb ('Glubb Pasha'), at the time the British commander of the Jordanian Arab Legion. Glubb suggested an annual budget of £40,000, the Foreign Office (FO) agreed a budget of £30,000 and the Levies was established under a British commander, Major Hankin Turvin, with two Arab officers and 32 other ranks seconded from the Arab Legion. It was later expanded to 30 British officers in command positions, with a handful of Arab officers. It recruited its soldiers locally, mostly from Abu Dhabi. By 1952 the force numbered some 200 men. There were also Yemeni soldiers assigned to the Trucial Oman Scouts from the Aden Protectorate Levies (APL), a British colonial militia based in South Yemen. It finally reached battalion strength.

In November 1952, some TOL soldiers were believed to be selling ammunition to the Saudis in Buraimi. Major Otto Thwaites, the commander of the TOL, went to Buraimi to investigate. There, three Yemeni soldiers of the TOL shot him dead. A Jordanian Regimental Sergeant Major, Daud Sidqi, and a Royal Air Force doctor, Flying Officer A.L.C. Duncan, were also killed in the attack, and two British NCOs, Sergeant Chinn and Corporal Cruickshank, were wounded but were able to drive away and get help. The three Yemeni soldiers who had carried out the attack fled to Saudi Arabia, but were eventually returned to Sharjah to stand trial after the intervention of His Highness Sheikh Zayed bin Sultan Al Nahyan of Abu Dhabi. The shootings revealed a key weakness in not screening the Yemeni soldiers from the APL before they joined the Trucial Oman Levies.

The first major achievement of the Levies was the cessation of both the Buraimi slave trade into Saudi Arabia and abductions into slavery, especially in the area of the Buraimi Oasis, and by the end of 1951 this trade had reportedly ceased. By 1955, the Trucial Oman Levies had 500 personnel organized into three rifle squadrons. In 1956, the force was organised into four rifle squadrons, including one squadron based at Buraimi.

== Buraimi Dispute ==
The Trucial Oman Levies fought a brief battle at the Al Buraimi Oasis on 26 October 1955. Two rifle squadrons deployed, along with troops from the Sultan of Muscat and Oman's personal guard, forcibly to evict a 15-man Saudi Arabian armed police garrison in an old fort and the village of Hamasa. The Saudi garrison had been based there since August 1952 when they occupied the Buraimi Oasis following an armed clash in which three people were killed.

The dispute arose from Saudi Arabia's claim, first made in 1949, of sovereignty over a large part of Abu Dhabi territory where oil was suspected to be present and an area in a 20-mile circle around the centre of the Buraimi Oasis. The claim arose after a geological party from the Arabian American Oil Company (Aramco) crossed the 'Riyadh line'. This was a border line negotiated in 1935 by the British on behalf of Oman and Abu Dhabi with Saudi Arabia, which the latter had rejected. The Aramco party was accompanied by Saudi guards and was met by Patrick Stobart, then the British political officer for the Trucial States. Stobart was briefly detained by the Saudis, who disarmed his guards. The incident led the British to formally protest to the king of Saudi Arabia, King Abdul Aziz Al Saud. The Saudis responded by extending their territorial claim to include the right to negotiate with the Sheikhs of the entire Buraimi/Al Ain Oasis and areas of the southern and western part of Abu Dhabi.

The British planned to use overwhelming force to prevent bloodshed, sending in 220 men, two squadrons of the Trucial Oman Levies, against the small Saudi force. However, the operation was complicated by the presence of large numbers of Bedouin around the oasis, including Kaabis from Mahadah under Sheikh Obaid bin Juma, who were subjects of Muscat but supported Shaikh Rashid bin Hamad of the Al Bu Shamis, themselves a notable force. The Na'im were also, under Sheikh Saqr Al Nuaimi, an unknown quantity. The operation was intended to quickly displace the Saudi force and fly them out of the area.

On 25 October, the Trucial Oman Levies quickly took the oasis and captured all fifteen of the Saudi contingent under the Saudi Emir Bin Nami, who was shot and lightly wounded when attempting to resist arrest and save a chest containing some 170,000 Rupees. The Saudi force was flown out on an RAF Valetta, which took them to Sharjah and then on to Saudi Arabia by sea. Most of the fighting took place after the surrender of the Saudis, with the Bedouin force of some 200 men putting up a spirited resistance to the Levies. A Lincoln bomber was called in, but couldn't use its machine guns as the area was populated by civilians.

The TOL operation in October 1955 resulted in nine deaths, including seven Saudi policemen/military personnel and two TOL soldiers, Jundi (private) Obaid Mubarak al Katabi and Jundi Sayid al Hadhrami. Three TOL soldiers were decorated for gallantry during this battle. Captain A. R. Steggles was awarded the Military Cross for saving a wounded TOL soldier under heavy fire. Sergeant Mohammed Nakhaira was awarded the Military Medal for his "courage, cool nerve and leadership." Lance Corporal Said Salem was awarded the Military Medal for driving a vehicle under heavy fire to deliver ammunition and retrieve wounded. Lance Corporal Salem was wounded in the fighting, and showed "the highest standard of personal courage and devotion to duty."

The Buraimi Dispute resulted in a proposed move to shrink the TOL being reversed and the force being increased. This move forced the Foreign Office to seek funding and in 1956, the Foreign Office and War Office shared the burden of funding the TOL equally. In order to encourage volunteers to the force, it was decided in late 1955 to change its name to the Trucial Oman Scouts.

== Trucial Oman Scouts ==
By 1957, the Scouts included 160 British officers and soldiers and, by 1960, had 1,000 paramilitary personnel. Two companies of the Trucial Oman Scouts fought in the Jebel Akhdar War in the Sultanate of Oman between 1955 and 1959, a rebellion against the Sultan of Muscat. Sergeant Major Khamis Hareb was awarded the Military Medal for his "fine leadership and courage" on 21 August 1956. Sir George Middleton, the British Political Resident in the Trucial Coast, pinned the medal on Sergeant Major Hareb. In January 1962, John Profumo, the British War Minister visited and inspected the Scouts in Aden, and chatted to one of the British Sergeants: Bert Baverstock. The final defeat of the rebels took place in January 1959 in an action led by the British SAS that the Trucial Oman Scouts supported, along with the Sultan's Northern Frontier Regiment.

The move to use the TOS, seen as a purely internal force, to intervene in a neighbouring conflict led to criticism in the Trucial States, among both the Rulers and their people and a large number of recruits withdrew their applications.

During the 1962-1976 Dhofar Rebellion, it was believed that many members of the Dhofar Liberation Front were former soldiers from the Sultan of Oman's Armed Forces (SAF), or the Trucial Oman Scouts.

In 1960, the Scouts mounted a road-building program, leading the construction of roads from Masafi to Fujairah through the Wadi Hamm, and from Masafi to Dibba through the Wadi Ayyinah, by blasting a route through the mountains using dynamite. This route remains a key road link to the East Coast of the UAE today.

By 1964 the Scouts had 1,500 Arab officers, NCOs and men, with 100 British officers, warrant officers and NCOs. It was organized into five rifle squadrons, each with three British and three Arab officers and 145 Arab other ranks, and one group equipped with machine guns and 3-inch mortars. There were also a reserve squadron, a signals squadron, a motor transport squadron, a medical centre, a workshop, a cadet squadron, a cadet school, and a training depot. From March 1964, the Commanding Officer (COMTOS) was Freddie De Butts. Among his officers was Jack Briggs, formerly a police officer in both Palestine and Qatar, who would go on to command the Dubai Police.

By 1965, the British Government was investing some £2 million annually in maintaining the Scouts, which ultimately reported to the Political Resident of the time. Former TOS commander Freddie De Butts cites this relationship as a cause behind the formation of the Abu Dhabi Defence Force by Sheikh Shakhbut in 1965. This was followed by the formation of similar forces by the Rulers of other emirates.

In 1969, British General Roland Gibbs became Commander of British Land Forces in the Persian Gulf, where he re-organised the Trucial Oman Scouts and laid the foundations for what is now the Sultan of Oman's Land Forces. The Scouts then expanded from 1,600 to 1,700 personnel in 1970 and to 2,500 in 1971.

== Sharjah Military Base ==
The TOS was headquartered in Sharjah, with its base moving from RAF Sharjah to Mirgab, a purpose-built base located in the Northern Sharjah suburb of Al Heera. The Scouts maintained small garrisons in most of the coastal towns and other key posts, including a base in Dubai from 1952 and a permanent garrison – one Field Squadron – at Buraimi Oasis.

The Mirgab Military base included a Medical Centre, Mechanical Transport Squadron, Signals Squadron and Quartermaster, with a dhobi and coffee shop owned and operated by an Emirati, Esa bin Mousa Al Amri, as well as a camp shop owned by a Mr Lalchand and managed by a Sikh gentleman by the name of Hari Singh Bhatia. A Scouts Club was eventually built at the base, constructed by local contractor Esa Mousa. The base is still in use today, as the headquarters of the Sharjah Police Special Tasks Department.

The TOS Training School and Depot for Arab Recruits was located in Manama, Ajman, while the Desert Regiment and Mortar Troop were based at Adhen. Other TOS squadrons maintained bases at Jahili Fort, Al Ain; Masafi; Mirfa and Khatt, in Ras Al Khaimah.

=== School ===
Local recruits had been sought by the TOS since the early 1950s, with a team travelling around the villages of the interior to seek new recruits. It was eventually decided to open a school to act as a feeder for recruitment, as well as to improve the image of the government. The TOS opened its school in May 1961 in the inland village of Manama, an exclave of Ajman and in its first year enrolled 50 students. The school offered an elementary education and, after finishing three years' study, students were given preference to enter the TOS. By 1954, the school was training 65 students aged between 10 and 17. The most promising of these were sent to the UK for officer training.

== Union Defence Force ==
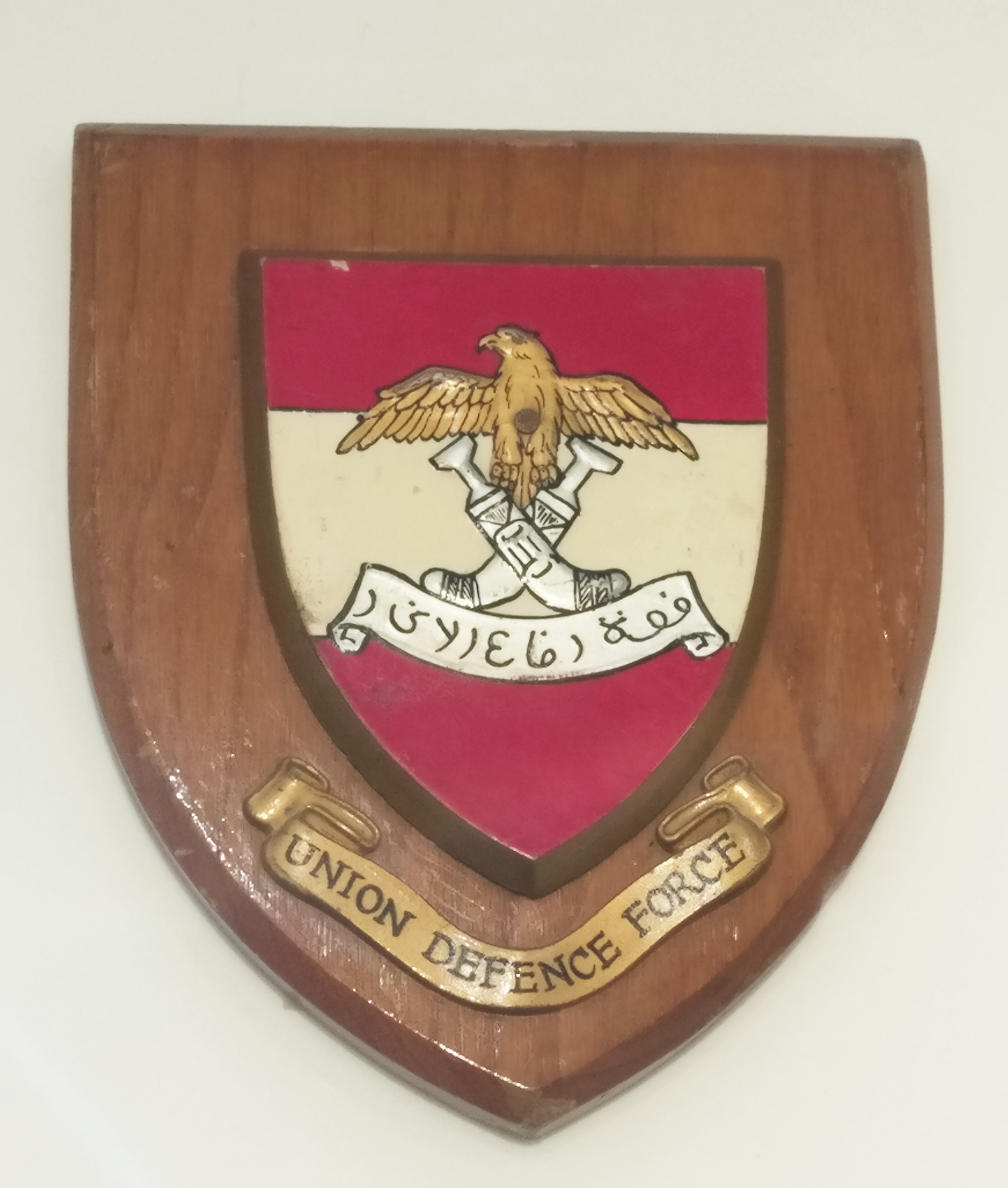
A falcon was added to the original Trucial Oman Scouts insignia to signify the union of the seven emirates and formation of the Union Defence Force.

The formation of the United Arab Emirates in 1971 resulted in the Scouts being reassigned into the Federal military body, the Union Defence Force (UDF). At the time, the Force consisted of 2,500 regular military personnel. In 1975, the UDF had 3,250 regular military personnel organised into six Mobile Squadrons and an Air Detachment with seven helicopters. The Force was equipped with Scorpion light tanks, Ferret armoured cars, Land Rovers, eight 81mm Mortars, and two dhows.

The handover from the Trucial Oman Scouts to the Union Defence Force formally took place on 22 December 1971, when UAE Minister of Defence Sheikh Mohammed bin Rashid Al Maktoum visited all the Trucial Oman Scouts bases together with UDF Commanding Officer Freddie de Butts.

In January 1972 during an attempted coup d'état in which 18 armed supporters of the former ruler of Sharjah, who included the former ruler, Sheikh Saqr bin Sultan (who ruled from 1951 until the British deposed him in 1965), attacked and seized the palace. The attackers killed Sheikh Khalid bin Mohammed Al Qasimi, ruler since 1965, along with one of his bodyguards. Sharjah soldiers and troops of the Union Defence Force then surrounded the palace. Several UDF troops were wounded, including a British captain, before the rebels surrendered next morning. Sheikh Saqr was then exiled.

In February 1972, there was a brief border war between Bedu tribesmen from Kalba and Fujairah over a disputed area that only covered a quarter of an acre but included water wells and date palm trees. Twenty-two people were killed and another 12 were wounded before UDF troops were able to impose a ceasefire.

In May 1976, the Union Defence Force unified and incorporated the military forces of the various UAE emirates. The former state units then lost their individual identities.

The UDF was organized as highly mobile light armored cavalry and included 40% locally recruited Arab personnel, including 50 Jordanian NCOs and Omanis, who formed the bulk of the troops. It also included Iranians, Indians, and Pakistanis. It remained under the command and control of 30 British officers until the mid-1980s.

== See also ==
- John Gouriet – served as an adjutant in the Trucial Oman Scouts from 1961 to 1963
