= Maritime Rescue Coordination Centre Mumbai =

The Maritime Rescue Co-ordination Centre Mumbai (MRCC) is responsible for co-ordinating air-sea rescue in Mumbai and an extensive area of the Arabian Sea. Besides the territorial waters of Mumbai. It works under Indian Coast Guard.

== Operations ==
On the evening of 12 January 2012, INCG Amrit kaur was on a training mission west of the Suheli Par atoll in the Lakshadweep archipelago. She was alerted by the Maritime Rescue Co-ordination Centre (MRCC), Mumbai about Somali pirate activity in the area to her west. INS Tir tracked the pirate skiffs to a hijacked Thai fishing trawler Prantalay 11 being used as a pirate mother ship.

On receiving distress call from MT Chios, a Greece-flagged crude oil tanker, was being chased by heavily armed pirates about 82 nautical miles west of Suheli Par in the Lakshadweep archipelago. The tanker, on its way from Singapore to Yemen, adopted best management practices and evasive manoeuvres to dodge the skiffs on the prowl. Meanwhile, an armed Dornier maritime reconnaissance aircraft launched from naval air station INS Garuda in the Southern Naval Command spotted the skiffs around 8pm on Saturday and relayed the location co-ordinates to INS Tir (A86), which was operating in close proximity.

There have been many instances of piracy in the Arabian Sea.
