= Vikram-class patrol vessel (2017) =

Patrol vessels of the Indian Coast Guard

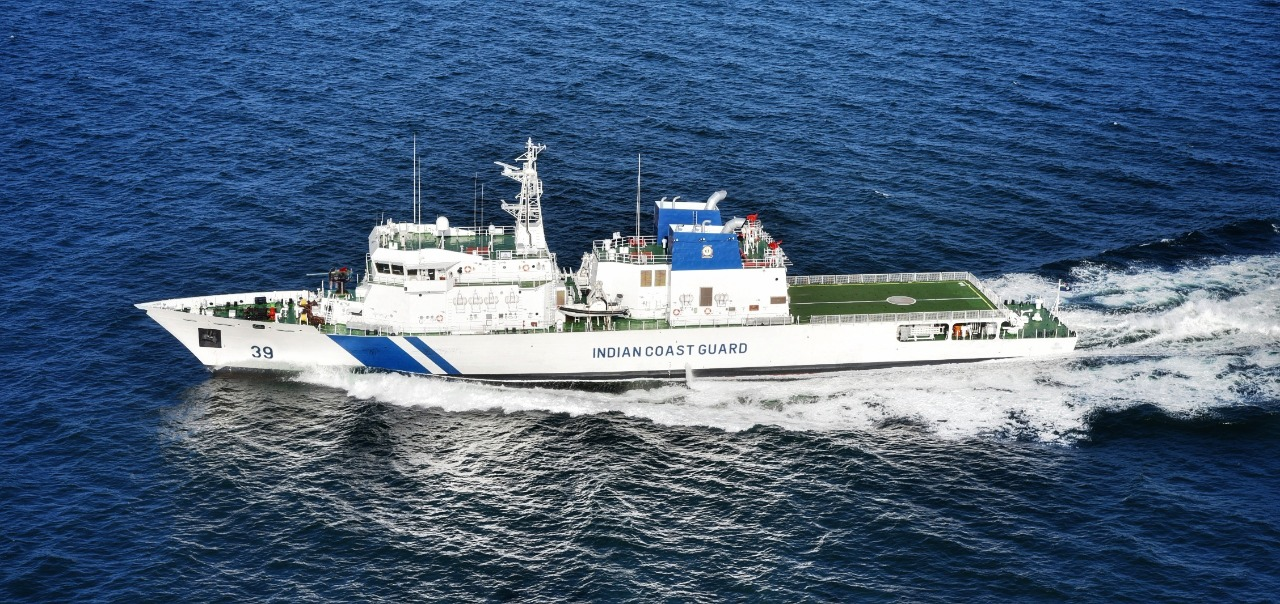
- ICGS Vigraha (39), during her sea trials.

Class overview
- Name: Vikram class
- Builders: Kattupalli Shipyard, L&T Shipbuilding, Chennai
- Operators: Indian Coast Guard
- Preceded by: Samarth class
- Succeeded by: MDL class
- Built: 2015–2021
- Planned: 7
- Completed: 7
- Active: 7

General characteristics
- Type: Offshore patrol vessel
- Displacement: 2,140 t (2,110 long tons; 2,360 short tons)
- Length: 98.2 m (322 ft 2 in)
- Beam: 15 m (49 ft 3 in)
- Draught: 3.6 m (11 ft 10 in)
- Speed: 26 knots (48 km/h; 30 mph)
- Range: 5,000 nmi (9,300 km; 5,800 mi) at 12–14 kn (22–26 km/h; 14–16 mph)
- Armament: 1 x 30 mm CRN 91 Naval Gun; 2 x 12.7 mm HMG with FCS
- Aircraft carried: 1 x HAL Dhruv

The Vikram-class offshore patrol vessel is a series of seven offshore patrol vessels (OPV) being built at the Kattupalli shipyard by L&T Shipbuilding for the Indian Coast Guard. These are long range surface ships which are capable of coastal and offshore patrolling.

== History ==
In March 2015, L&T Shipbuilding was awarded a ₹1,432 crore (US$150 million) contract by the Ministry of Defence to build seven offshore vessel patrol vessels for the Indian Coast Guard.

The last ship Vigraha was commissioned by Defence Minister Rajnath Singh on 28 August 2021.

In December 2023, a merchant ship was escorted back by ICGS Vikram to Indian waters after suffering a drone attack off the Arabian coast.

ICGS Veera also forms a part of the 1st Training Squadron (1TS) of the Indian Navy and was part of the 2024 Long Range Training Deployment (LRTD) flotilla to the Middle East.

Vigraha conducted an operational visit to Jakarta, Indonesia between 2 and 5 December 2025 while the personnel will undertake bilateral activities with Indonesian Coast Guard (Bakamla).

== Specification ==
The class is 97 metres (318 ft 3 in) long, 15 metres (49 ft 3 in) wide, with a 3.6-metre (11 ft 10 in) draught and has a displacement of 2,140 tonnes. It is capable of maximum speed of 26 knots (48 km/h; 30 mph) with a range of 5,000 nautical miles (9,300 km; 5,800 mi) at a cruising speed of 12 to 14 knots (22 to 26 km/h; 14 to 16 mph). The class will be armed with a 30 mm (1.18 in) CRN 91 Naval Gun, two 12.7 mm (0.50 in) heavy machine guns with fire control system, a helicopter for various operational, surveillance, and search and rescue missions. It also has modern radar; navigation and communication systems; front propulsion pods providing high maneuverability. It has been indigenously designed and has undergone dual certification from the American Bureau of Shipping and Indian Register of Shipping. The ships would be tasked with the roles of policing maritime zones, control and surveillance, search and rescue, pollution response, anti-smuggling and anti-piracy in the economic zones of the country.

== Ships ==
| Name | Pennant number | Keel laid | Launched | Commissioned | Status | Home Port |
|---|---|---|---|---|---|---|
| Vikram | 33 | March 2016 | 27 October 2017 | 11 April 2018 | Active | New Mangalore |
| Vijaya | 34 | | 20 January 2018 | 14 September 2018 | Active | Paradip |
| Veera | 35 | | 28 August 2018 | 15 April 2019 | Active | |
| Varaha | 41 | | 2 November 2018 | 25 September 2019 | Active | New Mangalore |
| Varad | 40 | 3 July 2018 | 31 August 2019 | 28 February 2020 | Active | Paradip |
| Vajra | 37 | 3 July 2018 | 27 February 2020 | 24 March 2021 | Active | Tuticorin |
| Vigraha | 39 | | 6 October 2020 | 28 August 2021 | Active | Vishakapatnam |

== Gallery ==
Samart-class ships at sea
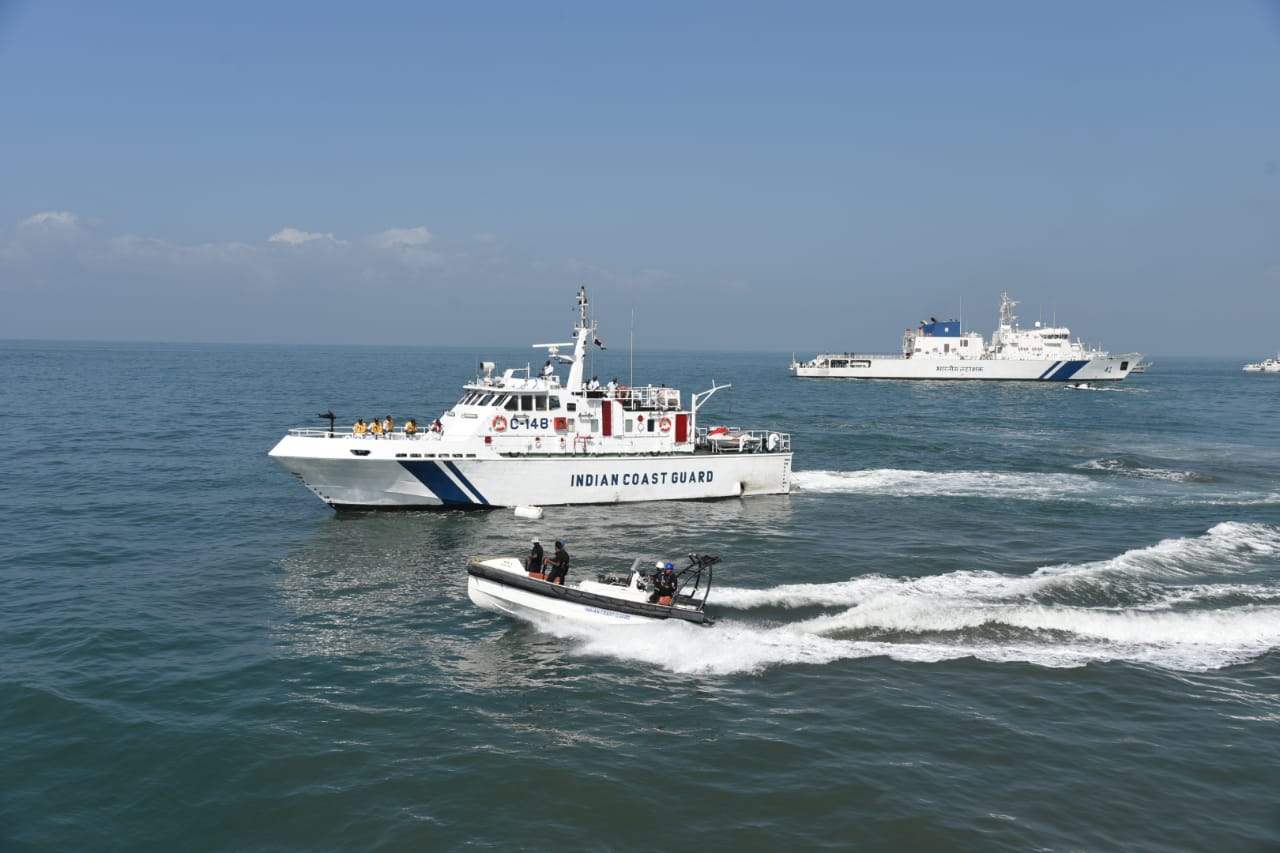
An ABG-class fast interceptor with the OPV ICGS Varaha during a rescue exercise

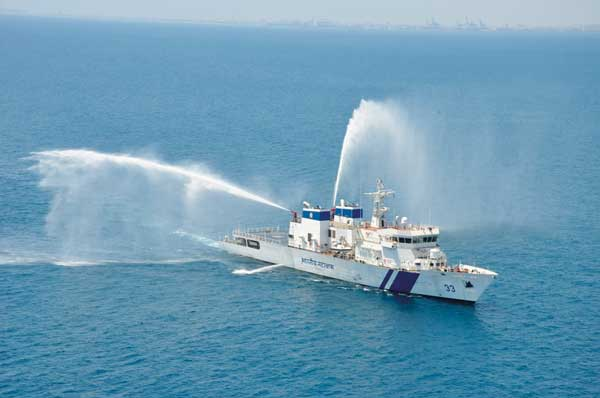
ICGS Vikram at sea

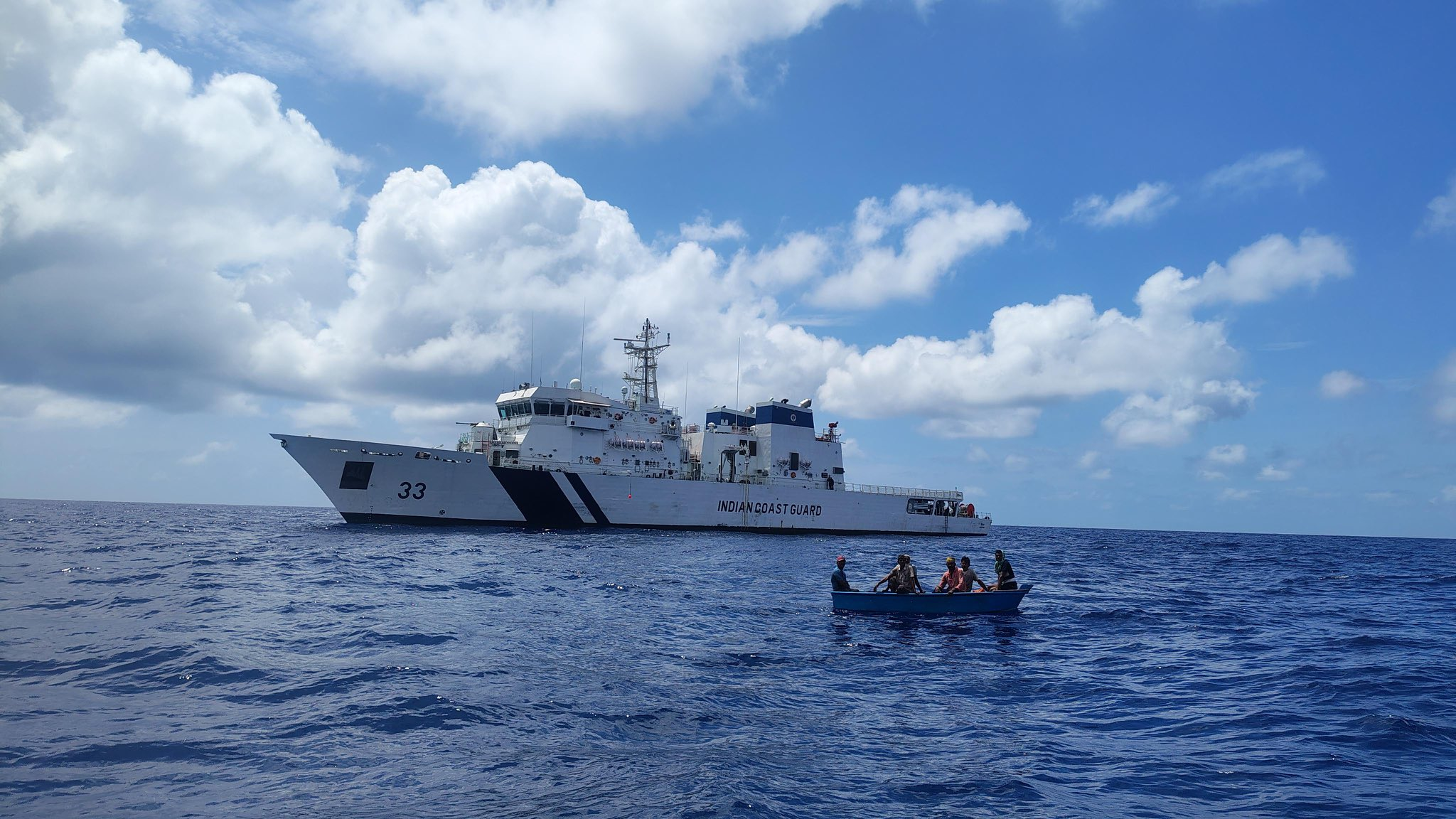
Vikram during a rescue mission.

== See also ==
- Samarth-class offshore patrol vessel
