= INS Shardul (2004) =

Indian military vessel

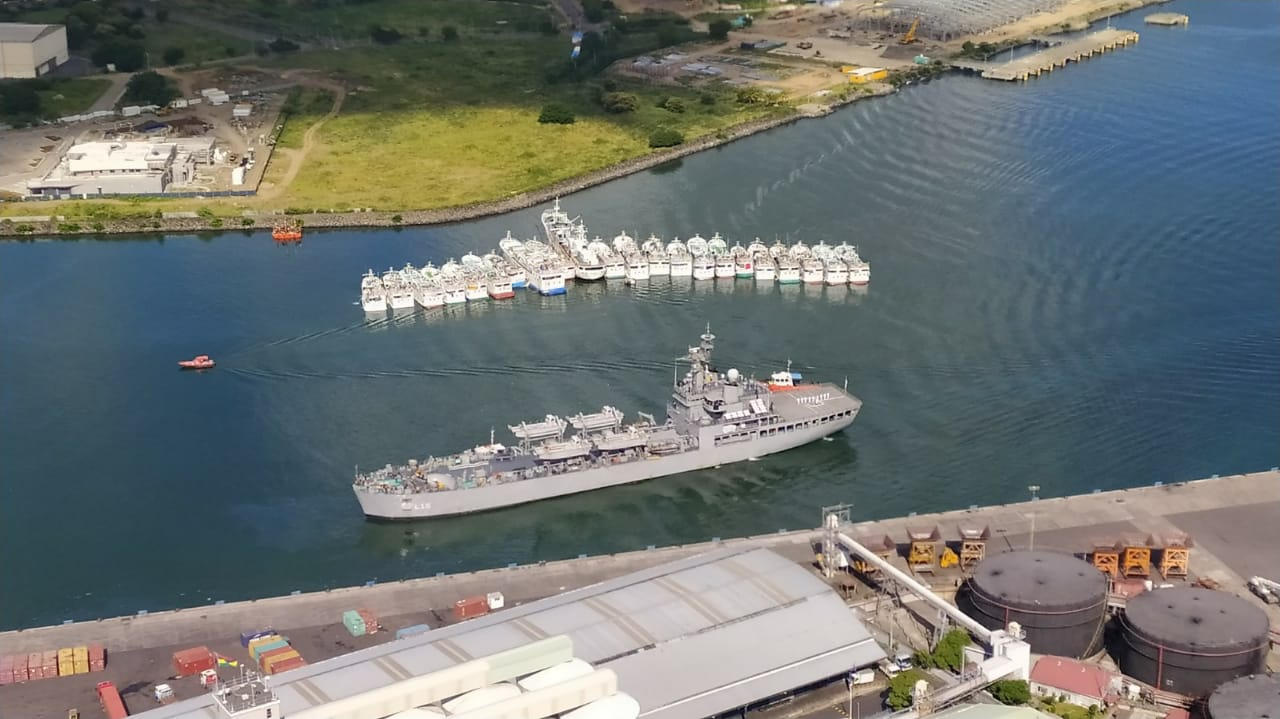
- INS Shardul (L16) at Port Luis, Mauritius

History

India
- Name: INS Shardul
- Namesake: Royal Bengal tiger
- Ordered: 2003
- Builder: Garden Reach Shipbuilders and Engineers
- Launched: 3 April 2004
- Commissioned: 4 January 2007
- Identification: Pennant number: L16; MMSI number: 419061200
- Motto: All for one, One for all
- Status: Active

General characteristics
- Class & type: Shardul-class tank landing ship
- Displacement: 5650 tons
- Length: 125 m (410 ft)
- Beam: 17.5 m (57 ft)
- Draught: 4 m (13 ft)
- Propulsion: Kirloskar PA6 STC engines
- Speed: 16 kn (30 km/h; 18 mph)
- Capacity: 11 MBT, 10 vehicles; 465.8 m^{3} (16,450 cu ft) water, 1,292.6 m^{3} (45,650 cu ft) diesel fuel
- Troops: 500
- Complement: 11 officers, 145 sailors
- Electronic warfare & decoys: Chaff launchers
- Armament: 2 × WM-18 rocket launchers; 4 × CRN-91 AA (Naval 30mm Medak) guns, MANPAD's.
- Aircraft carried: 1 Westland Sea King or HAL Dhruv

INS Shardul (L16) (lit. 'Tiger') is the lead ship of the Shardul-class tank landing ship of the Indian Navy. On 3 October 2008, Shardul was affiliated to the 5 Armoured Regiment of the Indian Army in an on-board ceremony, at the Mumbai Naval Base.

== History ==
Shardul started sea trials on 3 November 2006 and was commissioned into the Indian Navy, on 4 January 2007 by the then Defence Minister A. K. Antony at the naval base INS Kadamba in Karwar. The ship was based at the Southern Naval Command in Kochi to train cadets before their commissioning onboard INS Kesari and INS Airavat. In March 2017 the ship was deployed on a two-month long deployment in the Southern Indian Ocean to provide surveillance support in the region. On March 10, 2020, INS Shardul arrived at Port Antsiranana with relief material for Madagascar, after Cyclone Diane and floods earlier in the year. 600 tonnes of rice were handed over. This is the biggest relief load ever carried by any Indian warship.

=== 2024 ===
On 1 October 2024, Indian Navy's 1st Training Squadron (1TS), including INS Tir (A86), INS Shardul (L16) and ICGS Veera (35), reached Bandar Abbas, Iran for training purposes. The Indian flotilla was greeted by IRIS Zereh (P235) of the Islamic Republic of Iran Navy. The objective of the visit was enhancing maritime cooperation and interoperability. On 5 October, the 1st Training Squadron reached Muscat, Oman, the third time in the last decade. The flotilla was docked there until 9 October. On 12 October, Tir and Veera reached Port of Manama, Bahrain. On 12 October 2024, Shardul reached Port Rashid at Dubai, UAE. On 16 October, Shardul concluded her visit to Dubai with a Maritime Partnership Exercise with the United Arab Emirates Navy's Al Quwaisat.

=== 2025 ===
INS Shardul participated in the International Fleet Review 2025 and took part in Exercise Komodo hosted by the Indonesian Navy, along with a P-8I MPA from 15 to 22 Feb 2025.

On 1 September 2025, INS Tir, INS Shardul and ICGS Sarathi (18), as part of the 1st Training Squadron (1TS), reached Port Victoria, Seychelles on a long-range deployment to the South Western Indian Ocean Region. The visit included professional interaction with the crew of ESPS Navarra (F85) of the Spanish Navy who also visited the country during the period. The squadron departed the port on 4 September. On 16 September, the squadron, led by Captain Tijo K Joseph and joined by INS Sujata (P56), reached Maputo, Mozambique, for a four-day visit. The visit included bilateral exercises with the Mozambique Navy as well as visit of 1TS trainees to various training establishments of the Mozambique Defence Forces. The visit will conclude with a PASSEX and joint surveillance of Mozambique EEZ. The squadron also visited La Réunion during the deployment. On 25 September, the ships called at the Mombasa, Kenya. On 28 September, the fleet departed and conducted PASSEX with KNS Shupavu (P3130) of the Kenya Navy.

=== 2026 ===
INS Tir, INS Shardul, INS Sujata and ICGS Sarathi were deployed on a long-range training deployment (LRTD) to the South East Asia to train officer cadets from 110th Integrated Officers’ Training Course (IOTC). As part of the deployment, the squadron would take port calls at Singapore, Indonesia and Thailand. The course includes six international officer trainees. The deployment will also include officers from the Indian Army and the Indian Air Force.

On 15 January, the squadron called at Changi Naval Base, Singapore. Meanwhile, 2026 the has been designated ASEAN–India Year of Maritime Cooperation 2026. The Navy held harbour activities with the Republic of Singapore Navy. The Senior Officer 1TS and Commanding Officers visited the Commander of Maritime Training and Doctrine Command (MTDC). The ships departed Singapore on 18 January.

On 20 January, the ships reached Port of Belawan, Indonesia. They departed the port on 23 January.

On 25 January, the ships reached Phuket Deep Sea Port, Phuket, Thailand. Indian Navy regularly conducts Exercise Ayutthaya and Indo–Thai Coordinated Patrol (CORPAT) with the Royal Thai Navy. India will also take over the chairmanship of Indian Ocean Naval Symposium from Thailand starting February 2026. The visit concluded on 28 January as the ships left the port along with HTMS Huahin for a Passage Exercise (PASSEX).

On 18 February, the ships also participated at the International Fleet Review 2026 held at Visakapatanam.

The squadron, except Shardul, called at Port Victoria, Seychelles from 12–15 October during which they conducted a Passage Exercise (PASSEX) with PS Andromache of the Seychelles Coast Guard. The three ships thereafter reached Port of Colombo, Sri Lanka on 26 October and departed the island nation on 29 October. During the visit, the ships conducted a PASSEX with SLNS Nandimithra (P701), a Sa'ar 4-class fast attack craft of the Sri Lanka Navy.
