= Freddie De Butts =

British Army officer (1916–2005)

Brigadier Freddie De Butts (17 April 1916–24 August 2005) was a British Army officer, formerly Chief of Staff of the Trucial Oman Scouts and the first Chief of Staff of the United Arab Emirates' Union Defence Force. He played a pivotal role in the formation of the United Arab Emirates in 1971.

== Early life ==
De Butts was born on 17 April 1916 in a nursing home in Ipswich to British army officer Frederick Cromie De Butts and Kathleen Primrose O'Donnell, who died eight days after giving birth. He spent his earliest years living in Guernsey with his two aunts, Kathleen and Charlotte until the war was over. In 1920, De Butts' father married Sybil Katherine Beauchamp, who would become De Butts' godmother as well as stepmother. The family sailed to India that year with a governess employed to care for young Frederick, Miss Oakley. Originally posted to Quetta, the family spent the following three years in Jhansi in what was then the United Provinces.

In 1923, De Butts returned to England and was home schooled in the care of an aunt of military friends of his parents. He then spent a year at Melbreck pre-preparatory school in Tilford, Surrey. He went on to study as a boarder at Crowthorne Towers preparatory school and then attended Wellington School. He went on to read Modern History at Oriel College, Oxford in October 1934, where he also joined the Cavalry squadron of the University OTC. In 1936, De Butts undertook a six-week attachment to the Oxfordshire and Buckinghamshire Light Infantry in Colchester.

== Army service ==
Awarded a third-class degree, De Butts was immediately commissioned second lieutenant in the Somerset Light Infantry at Colchester, arriving there in September 1937. In January 1938 he was posted to the First Battalion in Poona, India. He was subsequently posted to the Suez Canal Zone as part of Force Heron, becoming an intelligence officer shortly after the outbreak of World War Two. He joined the newly-formed Western Desert Force in June 1940, being promoted to Major in September 1941. Having fought in North Africa and Sicily with the Eighth Army, in February 1944 De Butts was promoted to Lieutenant Colonel and posted to the Staff College at Camberley as an instructor. He was subsequently sent to serve on the staff in Germany and, following the end of the war, saw service in India and Malaya. Returning to the UK from Singapore, De Butts and his young family were shipwrecked when the Empire Windrush suffered an explosion in her engine room, losing in the process all of their personal property and effects.

== Middle East ==
Following service in Cyprus and Suez in 1955 and 1956, De Butts was promoted Brevet Lieutenant Colonel and posted to the Aden Protectorate Levies in May 1958, where he first met Sir William Luce, who was then Governor of Aden. His command of the Third Battalion of the Levies earned him an Order of the British Empire (OBE).

In Autumn 1963 De Butts was offered the opportunity to command the Trucial Oman Scouts, the paramilitary force that operated in the Trucial States under British control from 1951 to 1971, and took over command as COMTOS in March 1964. Among his officers was Jack Briggs, formerly a police officer in both Palestine and Qatar, who would go on to command the Dubai Police. In June 1966 De Butts oversaw the removal of Sheikh Shakhbut bin Sultan Al Nahyan in favour of Sheikh Zayed bin Sultan Al Nahyan, with a Trucial Oman Scouts force providing backup for British Political Resident Glencairn Balfour Paul, who conveyed the news to Shakhbut that the Al Nahyan family had called for him to step down. After a brief period of tension, the Scouts secured the situation and Shakhbut was taken to a temporary exile in a hotel in southwest Iran before later returning to Abu Dhabi, now firmly under Zayed's rule.

Following his retirement from the Army on 17 April 1971 with the rank of Colonel, De Butts was offered the opportunity by the Foreign Office to return to the newly founded United Arab Emirates, firstly to become director of the Military Liaison Office of Sir William Luce, the former British Political Resident in the Gulf (and previously Governor of Aden when De Butts headed the Aden Protectorate Levies), who was overseeing the British withdrawal from the region and was working with the Rulers of the seven emirates on the establishment of the United Arab Emirates.

He went on to head the Union Defence Force as its first commander with the rank of Brigadier, reporting to UAE Minister of Defence, Sheikh Mohammed bin Rashid Al Maktoum. On 22 December 1971, the Trucial Oman Scouts was formally handed over to the UAE to become the Union Defence Force. As an independent force following the foundation of the United Arab Emirates on 2 December 1971, the UDF was to first see action in the attempted coup that took place in Sharjah on 24 January 1972, under the command of Mohammed bin Rashid, who took the surrender of Sheikh Saqr bin Sultan Al Qasimi following the murder of the ruler of Sharjah, Sheikh Khalid bin Muhammad Al Qasimi. A further outbreak of instability post-independence took place on the east coast of the Emirates when fighting broke out between elements of the Qawasim and Sharqiyin tribes. In all, 22 of the local men were killed before peace could be restored, with two squadrons of the UDF and three from the Abu Dhabi Defence Force (ADDF), both reporting to different commands - a situation De Butts was to describe as 'absurd.'

Navy and Air Force units were added to the UDF's army under De Butts, who worked closely with Mohammed bin Rashid on the establishment of a modern defence capability for the UAE. De Butts' contract was extended in 1972 by Mohammed but increasing pressure from UAE president Sheikh Zayed to bring in non-British officers led to his retiring and leaving the Emirates at the end of that extension in April 1973.

Freddie De Butts passed on 24 August 2005.

== Personal life ==
De Butts' surname comes from a Dutch Huguenot family who moved to Ireland in the late 17th Century. De Butts married Simone Halsey on 8 July 1944 in Great Gaddesden, they had two children, David and Caroline.
