= INS Brahmaputra =

Following ships of the Indian Navy have been named Brahmaputra:

- INS Brahmaputra (F31) (1957) was a Type 41, Leopard-class frigate ordered for the Royal Navy as HMS Panther but transferred to India and renamed Brahmaputra before launching in 1957, commissioned in 1958. She was scrapped in 1986
- INS Brahmaputra (F31) (1994) is a Brahmaputra-class frigate commissioned in 2000
