= Port of Jebel Ali =

Port of Jebel Ali ميناء جبل علي
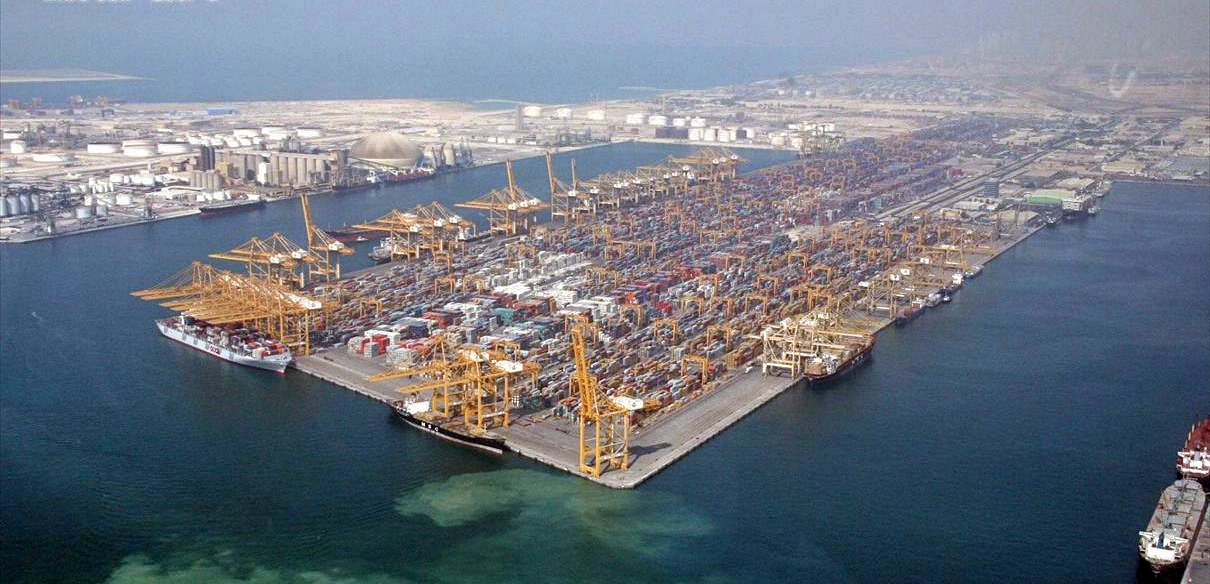
- Jebel Ali Port View
- Interactive map of Port of Jebel Ali ميناء جبل علي

Location
- Country: United Arab Emirates
- Location: Dubai
- Coordinates: 25.01126°N 55.06116°E
- UN/LOCODE: AEJEA

Details
- Opened: 26 February 1979 by Queen Elizabeth II
- Operated by: DP World
- No. of berths: 67

Statistics
- Annual container volume: 13.7 million TEU (2021) up 1.9% year-on-year
- Website www.dpworld.ae/en/home

Port of Jebel Ali, also known as Mina Jebel Ali, is a deep sea port located in Jebel Ali, Dubai, United Arab Emirates. Jebel Ali is the world's ninth busiest port, the largest man-made harbour, and the biggest and busiest port in the Middle East. Port Jebel Ali was constructed in the late 1970s to supplement the facilities at Port Rashid.

== Geography ==
Jebel Ali port is located 35 km southwest of Dubai, in the Persian Gulf. The port is part of the Maritime Silk Road that runs from the Chinese coast to the south via the southern tip of India to Mombasa, from there through the Red Sea via the Suez Canal to the Mediterranean, then to the Upper Adriatic region to the northern Italian hub of Trieste with its rail connections to Central Europe, Eastern Europe and the North Sea.

== History ==
Jebel Ali Port, credited to the efforts of Rashid bin Saeed Al-Maktoum, was constructed in the late 1970s and opened in 1979 to supplement the facilities at Port Rashid. It was inaugurated by Queen Elizabeth II on 26 February 1979. The village of Jebel Ali was constructed for port workers, and it has a population of 300 people. Covering over 134 square kilometres (52 sq mi). It is home to over 5,000 companies from 120 countries of the world. With 67 berths and a size of 134.68 square kilometres (52.00 sq mi), Jebel Ali is the world's largest man-made harbour and the biggest port in the Middle-East.

The port of Jebel Ali has become the port most frequently visited by ships of the United States Navy outside the United States. Due to the depth of the harbour and size of the port facilities, a Nimitz-class aircraft carrier and several ships of the accompanying battle group can be accommodated pier-side. Due to the frequency of these port visits, semi-permanent liberty facilities (referred to by service personnel as "The Sandbox") have been erected adjacent to the carrier berth.

== Operations ==
Port Jebel Ali encompass over one million square metres of container yard. It also contains space for medium- and long-term general cargo storage, including seven Dutch barns with a total of almost 19 thousand square metres and 12 covered sheds covering 90.5 square metres. In addition, Port Jebel Ali also consist of 960 thousand square metres of open storage.

Port Jebel Ali is linked to Dubai's expressway system and to the Dubai International Airport Cargo Village. The Cargo Village facilities capable of handling cargoes, making four-hour transit from ship to aircraft possible. The DPA's commercial trucking service transport container and general cargo transport between Port Jebel Ali, Port Rashid, and the rest of UAE every day.

Jebel Ali port is one of DP World's flagship facilities and have been ranked as 9th in Top Container Port Worldwide having handled 7.62 million TEUs in 2005, which represents a 19% increase in throughput, over 2004. Jebel Ali Port was ranked 7th in the world's largest ports in 2007. Jebel Ali port is managed by state-owned Dubai Ports World.

== Expansion ==
The expansion of Jebel Ali port commenced in 2001, which is the master plan of the port. The project comprises 15 stages, which will be completed over the decade. Stage one was completed in 2007, which has increased the storage and handling capacity by 2.2 million TEUs and a Quay length of 1,200 m.

The entire project includes 2.4 km of new berths, the container yard behind the berths and the supporting infrastructure and buildings necessary for a fully functioning terminal. The new port will be on reclaimed land extending seaward from the existing port and situated to the west of the Jumeirah Palm Island complex.

The current plan is expected to multiply the total capacity of Jebel Ali port by more than seven, making it the world's biggest container port, surpassing the ports of Shanghai and Singapore.

== Awards ==
On 9 April 2011 Port of Jebel Ali won the Golden Award for Best Seaport Overall from the Higher Committee for UAE Civil Seaports and Airports Security.

== Gallery ==
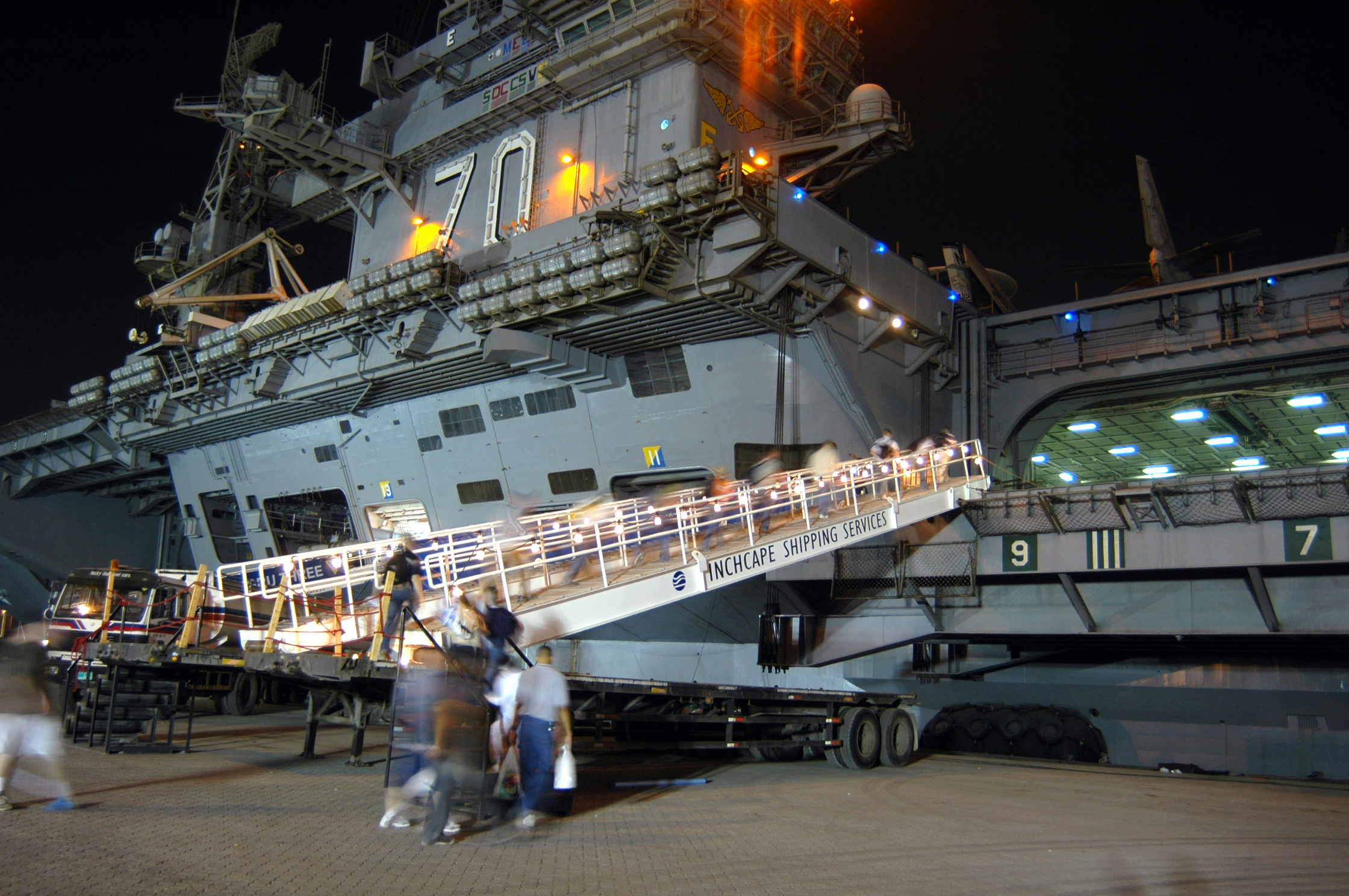
US Navy ship at Jebel Ali, UAE

== See also ==
- Container transport
- List of East Asian ports
