= 70th Armoured Regiment (India) =

Indian Army regiment

- Cap Badge of 70th Armoured Regiment
- Active: 1968 – present
- Country: India
- Allegiance: India
- Branch: Indian Army
- Type: Armoured Corps
- Size: Regiment
- Mottos: करके रहेंगे Karke Rahenge (We shall do it)
- Colors: Black and Red
- Equipment: T-90

Commanders
- Notable commanders: Lieutenant General Devendra Sharma

Insignia
- Abbreviation: 70 Armd Regt

70 Armoured Regiment is an armoured regiment of the Indian Army.

== Formation ==
The regiment was raised on February 11, 1968 at Ahmednagar by Lieutenant Colonel (later Brigadier) R Christian as 70 Guided Missile Regiment. Brigadier AN Jatar, MVC, AVSM was the first Colonel Commandant.

It was the first anti-tank guided missile regiment of the Indian Army. It also has the distinction of being the first armoured regiment with a “mixed class” composition, drawing troops from various castes and religions.

== Equipment ==
At the time of raising, the Regiment was equipped with the SS11B1 anti-tank missiles. In 1975, the Regiment handed over its missile equipment, along with some officers and other ranks to 15 Guards and was reorganised as a tank regiment and was equipped with T-55 tanks. It converted to MBT T-90 in 2010.

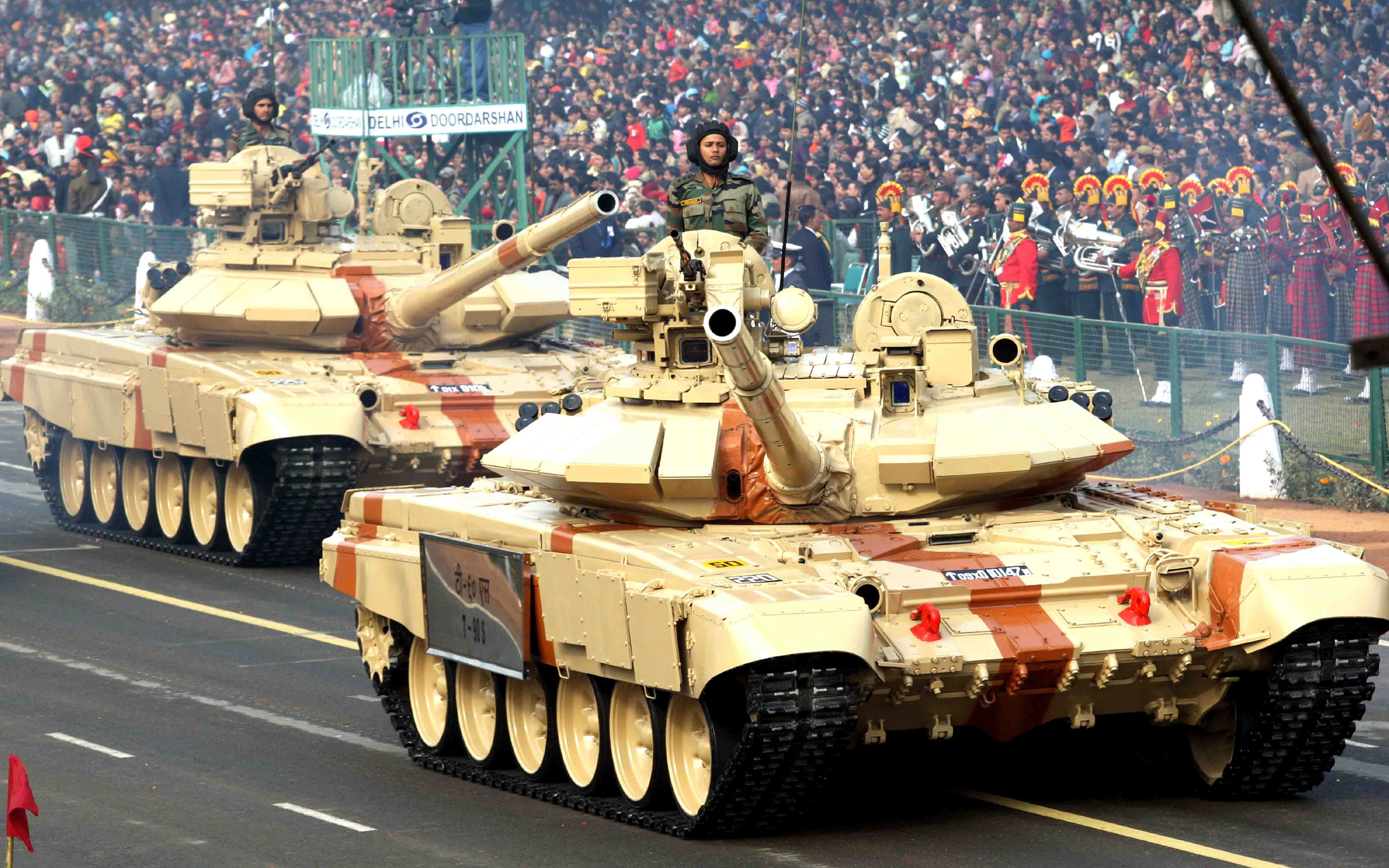
T-90 tanks of 70 Armoured Regiment during the full dress rehearsal for the Republic Day Parade, 2011

== Operations ==
Indo-Pakistani War of 1971
The regiment took part in the 1971 Indo-Pak war on the western front. Sub-units of the Regiment saw action in Jaisalmer/ Rann of Kutch, Ganganagar and Fazilka sectors. It achieved its first tank kill on the Sabuna drain in the Fazilka sector on December 7, 1971. Dafadar Uttam Singh was awarded the Sena Medal for his bravery in the Fazilka sector.

The Regiment was presented the President's Standard on 27 November 2011 by the then President of India Mrs Prathiba Patil. 70 Armoured Regiment along with four other Armoured Regiments of the 1 Armoured Division got their colours in Patiala.

== Regimental Insignia ==
The regiment has a unique cap badge for an armoured unit - it consists of a SS11B1 anti-tank missile with the numeral "70" inscribed over it. The Regiment chose Black and Red as its colours, signifying 'Death (Black) to the Enemy, at any cost (Red)'. The motto of the Regiment is करके रहेंगे Karke Rahenge (We shall do it).
