= IRIS Zereh =

Sina-class fast attack craft

History

Iran
- Name: Zereh
- Owner: Iranian Navy
- Operator: Islamic Republic of Iran Navy
- Launched: 2020
- Commissioned: 13 January 2021
- Home port: Bandar Abbas
- Identification: Pennant number: P235; IMO number: 4713722
- Status: In active service

General characteristics (as built)
- Class & type: Sina-class fast attack craft
- Displacement: 275 tons full load
- Length: 47 m (154 ft)
- Beam: 7.1 m (23 ft)
- Height: 15 m
- Draught: 2 m (6 ft 7 in)
- Propulsion: 4 MTU MD 16V 538 TB90 diesels, 4 shafts, 14,400 bhp (10,700 kW)
- Speed: 36 kn (67 km/h; 41 mph)
- Complement: 31
- Armament: 2 or 4 C802 surface-to-surface missiles; 1 Fajr-27 DP gun; 1 40 mm Fatah 40 anti-aircraft gun

The Zereh (P235) (Persian زره) is an Iranian Sina-class fast attack craft. serving in the Southern Fleet of the Islamic Republic of Iran Navy. It has advanced automated missiles and artillery.

== History ==
The Zereh is a Sina-class (or Kaman-class) fast attack craft, which is an upgrade of France's Combattante II missile vessels.

A ceremony was held on 13 January 2021 to introduce the new Zereh warship.

On 1 October 2024, Indian Navy's First Training Squadron, including INS Tir, INS Shardul and ICGS Veera, reached Bandar Abbas, Iran for training purposes. The Indian flotilla was greeted by IRIS Zereh of the Iran Navy. The objective of the visit was enhancing maritime cooperation and interoperability.

== Specifications ==
Zereh is 47 meters long, 7.1 meters wide, and 15 meters high, with a displacement tonnage ranges from 275 to 300 tonnes. The Zereh has four MTU MD 16V 538 TB90 engines that deliver 12,000 horsepower. This vessel can attain a top speed of 36 knots (67 km/h; 41 mph). The warship also has four 140 kW power generators that produce electricity for diverse uses.

=== Armaments ===
The primary weapon of the Zereh is the 76 mm 'Fajr 27', a copy of the 76mm OTO-Melara automatic cannon with a maximum range of 17 km, 12 km against surface targets, and 7 km against air targets. It also has the 'Fatah 40', a Bofors 40 mm/70 automatic cannon with a range of 4 km against air targets, 6 km against sea and ground targets, and an ultimate range of 12 km. It also has a 300 km Qadir surface-to-surface missile system, a license-produced replica of the Chinese C-802 anti-ship missile, which is an enhanced version of the Chinese YJ-8 anti-ship missile.
