= Al-Quwaisat-class landing ship =

Class overview
- Name: Al-Quwaisat class
- Builders: Shin Yang
- Operators: United Arab Emirates Navy
- Planned: 3
- Completed: 3
- Active: 3

General characteristics
- Type: Landing Ship Tank
- Displacement: 2,046 tons
- Length: 80 m (262 ft 6 in)
- Beam: 16.8 m (55 ft 1 in)
- Draught: 4 m (13 ft 1 in)
- Propulsion: 2 × Cummins KTA50-M2; 4 × Cummins KTA19-D (M1)
- Speed: Maximum: 14 knots (26 km/h; 16 mph); Cruising: 12 knots (22 km/h; 14 mph)
- Range: 2,500 nmi (4,600 km; 2,900 mi)
- Endurance: 21 days
- Capacity: Cargo, Marine troops, Tanks
- Complement: 106
- Armament: 12.7 mm Browning M2HB machine guns
- Aviation facilities: Helicopter landing platform

The Al-Quwaisat class is a series of Landing Ship Tanks (LSTs) of the United Arab Emirates Navy (UAE Navy). They were built by the Malaysian company Shin Yang based on the company's 80 m LST design. Two ships have been completed and in service with UAE Navy with one more ordered in 2020.

== Characteristics ==
The Al-Quwaisat class has a length of 80 metres (262 ft 6 in), a beam of 16.8 metres (55 ft 1 in), and a draught of 4 metres (13 ft 1 in). The ship has a complement of 106. The LSTs have a capacity to carry cargo, marine troops, tanks and helicopters. They have a displacement of 2,046 tonnes and a speed of 12 knots (22 km/h; 14 mph) for cruising and 14 knots (26 km/h; 16 mph) for maximum. The ships are armed with light defensive weapons such as 12.7 mm Browning M2HB machine guns.

== Service history ==
The Al-Quwaisat class took part in UAE Navy operations in the Yemen conflict. They were involved in a logistic role to support allied forces in the operation.

On 16 October 2024, Al-Quwaisat participated in a Maritime Partnership Exercise with Indian Navy's INS Shardul during its visit to Port Rashid, Dubai as a part of long range training deployment.

== Ships of the class ==
Pennant	Name	Builders	Launched	Commissioned
A81	Al-Quwaisat	Shin Yang	17/10/2012	2/10/2013
A82	Al-Futaisi	Shin Yang	29/10/2012	2/10/2013
A83	Al-Taweelah	Shin Yang	7/7/2020	2021
