= Shin Yang Group =

Malaysian company

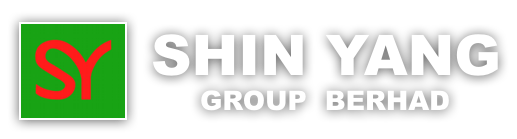
- Type: Public limited company
- Industry: Timber, Shipping and ship building, Property development and civil engineering, Plantation, Service and support
- Founded: 1983; 43 years ago
- Founder: Ling Chiong Ho
- Headquarters: Miri, Sarawak, Malaysia

Shin Yang Group (Shin Yang or SY) is a multinational conglomerate in Malaysia headquartered in Miri, Sarawak. Established on 24 February 1983, Shin Yang owned subsidiaries with various business activities such as timber, shipping and shipbuilding, property development and civil engineering, plantations, service and support.

== History ==
Shin Yang (SY) was established on 24 February 1983 and has subsidiaries operating in various sectors.

- Timber
- Shipping and shipbuilding
- Property development and civil engineering
- Plantation
- Service and support

== Timber ==
Shin Yang Group of wood based division is a leading manufacturer of wood-related products. Shin Yang is equipped with processing machines that enable it to expand its products to products such as Phenolic Film Faced Plywood, Urethane Faced Plywood, Laminated Veneer Lumber, Wood Pellets, Furniture and more. Shin Yang's total plywood production capacity can reach over 100,000m3 per month.

Shin Yang Sdn Bhd (997865-T) was incorporated on 24 February 1983. It is the main harvesting contractor for the Shin Yang Group's Forest Management Unit (FMU) for Forest Timber License of Planted Forest (LPF). In addition, Shin Yang has a number of associated companies covering Natural Forest Timber License in Sarawak, Malaysia.

== Shipping and shipbuilding ==
In the shipping division of SY, Shin Yang Shipyard Sdn Bhd, Piasau Slipways Sdn Bhd, Shinline Sdn Bhd, Thailine Sdn Bhd, Danum Shipping Sdn Bhd and Shin Yang Shipping Sdn Bhd play important roles in the marine industry both domestically and internationally.

SY's shipping division offers shipbuilding services (for domestic and international markets), ship repair, ship conversion, ship engineering, ship structures, international shipping, domestic shipping (bulk & container services), engineering fabrication and offshore structural fabrication.

== Property development and civil engineering ==
Starting in the late 70s, Miri-based Pekerjaan Piasau Konkerit Sdn. Bhd. (PPK) was established as a modest construction and development company in Miri. Over the years, PPK has grown and is now a well-diversified company within the Shin Yang Group with its core business activities spanning property development, building construction, civil engineering works such as roads, bridges and marine structural works.

Apart from that, PPK is also involved in the manufacturing of construction products such as precast concrete products, lightweight concrete, concrete pavers, cement sand bricks, concrete piles, ready-mix concrete suppliers, hot mix asphalt concrete pavement manufacturers, sand and aggregate suppliers, etc. In 2001, PPK obtained ISO 9002 certification in the manufacturing of paving blocks and cement bricks, production and delivery of ready-mix concrete.

The company has been involved in sectors such as plywood mills, sawmills, paving and potting factories, quarry factories, warehouses and workshops, state roads and bridges, ship access roads and wharves, wharves and filling and dredging wharves, earthworks, 800 units of residential houses, 220 units of shophouses, and most recently, the Boulevard Shopping Complex, a landmark shopping complex in Miri.

== Plantation ==
Linau Mewah Sdn. Bhd. As a group manager has been certified under the General Principles MS 2530-3: 2013 for Oil Palm Plantations and Organized Smallholders consisting of Linau Mewah Estate, Baramville Estate and Woodville Estate, Bakam Estate and Seramban Estate, Meting Estate, Adam Estate, Linau Sinar Estate and Kenaban Estate. Meanwhile, Shin Yang Forestry Sdn. Bhd. - Bumimas Estate underwent individual certification and was also recently certified under the same scheme.
