= Dubai English Speaking College =

Dubai English Speaking School
- Academic City; Dubai; UAE

Information
- School type: Independent school
- Motto: Dare, Excel, Share, Create
- Founded: 2005
- Founder: Peter Daly
- Authority: KHDA
- Head teacher: Chris Vizzard
- Years offered: Year 7 - Year 13
- Gender: Co-Educational
- Enrollment: 1100
- Average class size: 25
- Education system: British National Curriculum
- Language: English
- Houses: Desert, Earth, Sky, Coast
- Accreditation: BSOS & DSIB
- School fees: 75,000 AED Onwards
- Website: https://dess.sch.ae/

Dubai English Speaking School College (formerly Dubai English Speaking College), is a British private school located in the Academic City, Dubai, UAE. It follows the National Curriculum for England. DESC was founded by the first headteacher, Peter Daly, in 2005 with 35 Year 7 students, and was located at the Oud Metha site of their sister school - the Dubai English Speaking School, which is Dubai's oldest British school. As of December 2016, the college has over 1100 students from Year 7 to Year 13.

The DESS facilities are located in the Academic City, Silicon Oasis, and were officially opened in February 2007 by the Duchess of Cornwall and Princess Haya Bint Al Hussein, Princess of Jordan and Sheikha of Dubai.

== History ==
Dubai English Speaking College was founded in 2005 by the first headteacher, Peter Daly, with just 35 Year 7 students. It takes its name from its sister school, Dubai English Speaking School, which is the oldest British school in Dubai. Originally located at the Oud Metha site of their sister school, DESC relocated to the Academic City in February 2007, where its facilities were officially opened by the Duchess of Cornwall and Princess Haya Bint Al Hussein.

In 2011, Andrew Gibbs was appointed the new headteacher of the school, with the college doubling in size during that time. In 2014 he was appointed the first principal of DESSC (DESS and DESC), with Chris Vizzard (previously the Deputy Headteacher) becoming the new headteacher at DESC. After Chris Vizzard's departure in 2025, the prior deputy head teacher, Matthew Cotgrove, took over as head of the college.

In 2026, Andrew Gibbs announced his retirement from the position of CEO of both schools, "DESS," and "DESC". The school as a whole then re-branded to DESS College, replacing the previous "DESC."

== Campus ==
The main Dubai English Speaking College is split into nine separate buildings. The campus also contains 4 pitches, 2 swimming pools, and 4 netball courts. The newest addition to DESC is a sixth form centre.

Four of the buildings are house buildings - each of the four houses (Desert, Earth, Sky and Coast) is taught in a separate building. The mathematics department is located in the Desert house block, Earth Block contains science labs, art, DT an Food and Nutrition, Sky Block has English inside, and coast has MFL.The other four buildings comprise one for the reception and the arts department, the auditorium, one for the canteen and the admissions office.

The sixth form is located on its own campus that offers a range from A-levels to B-tech. The Sixth form center has its own gym, dinner area, zen garden and study areas.

Out of the 4 pitches, 1 is a football pitch, named the "Astro" pitch; the second pitch is designed for Rugby, and the other two are standard grass football pitches.

== Curriculum ==
The school offers secondary school courses for students starting from Year 7 (also known as Grade 6) - Key Stage 3, and leading up to the 2 year GCSE course starting in Year 10 (Key Stage 4). The students then proceed onto the AS and A2 (A Level) qualifications offered for Year 12 and 13 (Key Stage 5), and the school now offer the alternative qualification BTEC.

During KS3, the students study a general set of subjects.

As KS4 starts, students get the option of choosing their subjects. Some of the GCSE choices are compulsory, including:

- English Language and Literature
- Mathematics
- Science (a combination of Physics, Biology and Chemistry)
- Modern Foreign Language (French or Spanish or Arabic, with students who hold an Arab passport requiring to take Arabic A)
- 1 Humanities subject (Business Studies, Economics, Geography, History or Psychology)
- 1 Technology subject (Computer Science, ICT, Design Technology, Media Studies, Music Technology)
- 1 Subject of choice (Islamic Students have to take Islamic Studies instead of either this or the technology subject)

For the last option, the subjects offered include Art, Drama, Music and G.R.O.W/L.I.F.E (a developmental program, aimed at developing skills for future life).

Key Stage 5: Students are allowed to either continue with the subjects they have taken during GCSE, and take them at the AS and A Level, or choose a new set of subjects, which isn't recommended. The expectations are to study four AS subjects in year 12, and then choose three of the subjects to study at A level in year 13 (It is possible to take more if one wishes).

The National Curriculum for England has undergone major changes. Previously, students took their AS-level exams in year 12, and A Level exams in year 13, with both of the exam grades counting towards the final grade in year 13. However, this has changed - only the final exams in year 13 will count towards the A level grade. At DESC, the only two subjects where the AS level examinations will still count towards the grade (50% of the grade) are the Mathematics and Further Mathematics courses.

== Extracurricular activities ==
=== General activities ===
A wide range of extracurricular activities is offered, with clubs including a robotics club, multiple ecology-related activities, and several clubs aimed at the development of leadership skills (such as an enterprise club).

=== Duke of Edinburgh International Award ===
The International Award (sometimes known as the Duke of Edinburgh Award) is an international youth awards programme, founded in the UK. As of December 2016, schools from over 144 countries are participating. The award recognises adolescents and young adults for completing a series of self-improvement exercises, aimed at bringing together practical experiences and life skills in order to equip those who participate in it. Dubai English Speaking College allows students from Year 10 up to Year 13 to participate in all three awards (Bronze, Silver and Gold).

=== Sports ===
Dubai English Speaking College maintains Basketball, Football, Netball, Rounders, Rugby Sevens and Rugby Union teams. Each team competes in four age categories, namely U12 (read as under-twelves), U14, U16 and U18.

DESC won the U19 Rugby 7s tournament in Dubai at the 2017 Dubai Rugby 7s.

== KHDA Inspection Report ==
The Knowledge and Human Development Authority (KHDA) is an educational quality assurance authority based in Dubai, United Arab Emirates. It undertakes early learning, school and higher learning institution management and rates them, based on the performance of both the students and the teachers, with ratings ranging from Unsatisfactory to Outstanding.

Below is a summary of the inspection ratings for Dubai English Speaking College from 2008–2009 to 2017–2018.

School name	2017-2018	2016-2017	2015-2016	2014-2015	2013-2014	2012-2013	2011-2012	2010-2011	2009-2010	2008-2009
Dubai English Speaking College	Outstanding	Outstanding	Outstanding	Outstanding	Outstanding	Outstanding	Outstanding	Good	Good	Good

== Former Headteachers ==
1. Peter Daly - the first headteacher of the school, having founded it in 2005.
2. Andrew Gibbs- appointed as the headteacher in 2011. Under him, the school has doubled in size.
3. Chris Vizzard- previously the deputy headteacher; appointed in 2014 when Andrew Gibbs became the first principal of DESSC (both DESS and DESC).

== Dubai English Speaking School ==
Dubai English Speaking School is a private British school, following the National Curriculum for England, and a sister school to the Dubai English Speaking College. DESS is Dubai's oldest English school, founded in 1963 and located in Oud Metha, Dubai. It provides elementary education to students from Foundation Stage 1 (FS1) to year 6, and, as of December 2016, has around 900 students.
