= Port Rashid =

Port in Dubai

Mina Rashid ميناء راشد
- Community
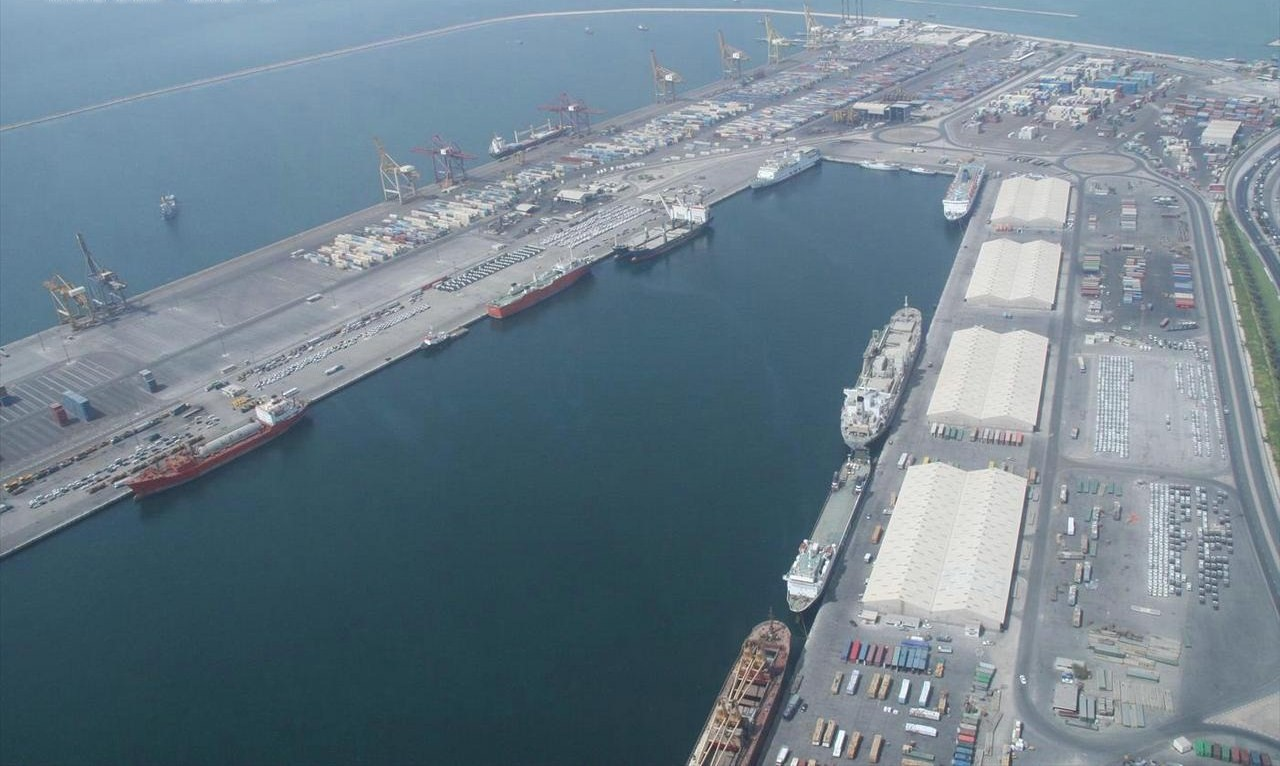
- Aerial view of Port Rashid before turning into a cruise terminal
- Interactive map of Mina Rashid
- Coordinates: 25.27481°N 55.29041°E
- Country: United Arab Emirates
- Emirate: Dubai
- City: Dubai
- Opened: 5 October 1972; 53 years ago

Area
  - Total: 3.10 km^{2} (1.20 sq mi)

Population (2000)
  - Total: 4,183
  - Density: 1,350/km^{2} (3,490/sq mi)
- Community number: 321

Port Rashid (Arabic: ميناء راشد; mina'a rāšid) is a man-made cruise terminal in Dubai, United Arab Emirates. It was Dubai's first commercial port; in 2018 cargo operations moved to Jebel Ali Port. It is a seafront coastal destination, tourist cruise destination, and residential area. It is the permanent home of Queen Elizabeth 2.

== History ==
The port is named after Sheikh Rashid bin Saeed Al Maktoum and it was opened in 1972. At the time the port only had two gantry cranes and a capacity of less than 100,000 TEUs. In 1978, the port was expanded to include 35 berths (five of which were able to be used by the largest container ships at the time). Later, the port [which has a depth of 13 metres (43 ft)] had 9 gantry cranes and a capacity of 1,500,000 TEUs.

Mina Rashid provided berths for general cargo, RoRo and passenger vessels. In the early 1980s, Mina Rashid was supplemented by Port of Jebel Ali, which is further from the commercial centre of Dubai near the Abu Dhabi border.

Adjacent to the port are Dubai Drydocks and Dubai Maritime City. Both of these facilities were built due to Mina Rashid's proximity. But, in January 2008, it was announced that the port would be redeveloped. All cargo operations will move to Jebel Ali Port by the end of March 2018. Mina Rashid will turn into a cruise terminal. Also, part of the port will be reclaimed by Nakheel Properties to create "a vibrant mixed-use urban waterfront" that will house 200,000 residents.

In collaboration with DP world, top developer Emaar had announced an exclusive launch of a new project Sirdhana at Mina Rashid, which offers 1-3 Bedroom Apartments situated within a new maritime destination of Mina Rashid, Dubai.

== Queen Elizabeth 2 ==
Port Rashid is the current location of the former Cunard Ocean Liner Queen Elizabeth 2 (QE2) which arrived there on 26 November 2008 at the end of her final voyage for the company before being handed over to her new owners. In March 2017, a Dubai-based construction company announced it had been contracted to refurbish the ship. The restored QE2 opened as a floating hotel on 18 April 2018.
