= List of historical equipment of the Indian Coast Guard =

This is a list of retired equipment of the Indian Coast Guard, including ships and aircraft.

== Former vessels ==
Vessels belonging to the Indian Coast Guard bear the prefix "ICGS" – Indian Coast Guard Ship.

Class	Picture	Origin	Type	Commissioned	Displacement	Comment
Offshore patrol vessels
Blackwood class		United Kingdom	Offshore patrol vessel (Frigate)	1978–1988	1,456 tons	Former INS Kirpan and INS Kuthar transferred from the Indian Navy in 1978. Kirpan decommissioned 1987, Kuthar decommissioned September 1988.
Vikram class		India	Offshore patrol vessel	1983–1992	1,220 tons	6 decommissioned, 1 lost, 2 transferred
Samar class		India	Offshore patrol vessel	1996–present	1,800 tons	2 decommissioned, 2 still in service
Inshore/Coastal patrol vessels
Pulicat Class		Soviet Union	Riverine Patrol Vessel	1977	92 tons	Five ships Transferred from Indian Navy in 1977. All have been Decommissioned.
Rajhans class		India	Patrol vessel	1980–1987	200 tons	All 5 have been decommissioned.
Tara Bai class		Singapore	Coastal patrol vessel	1987–2014	236 tons	All 6 have been decommissioned.
Jija Bai class		Japan India	Patrol vessel	1984-2011	181 tonnes	All retired
Priyadarshini class		India	Fast patrol vessel	1992–1998	215 tons	All 8 decommissioned.
Timblo class		India	Patrol vessel	-	-	Order for 30 vessels cancelled.
Interceptor Boats (10)
Mandovi Marine class patrol craft		India	Interceptor craft	c.1980-c.1990	10 tons	5 units built.
Vadyar class		India	Short range Interceptor craft	1988-c.2012		Used for patrolling southern coast of India near Rameshwaram.
AMPL-class interceptor boat		India	Interceptor craft	1993–2003	49 tons	10 vessels. One Leased to Mauritius in 2001
Swallow Craft-class		South Korea	Inshore Patrol vessel	1980-2001	32 tons	Inshore patrol vessel. All decommissioned.

== Former Aircraft ==
Aircraft	Origin	Type	Variant	Retired	Notes
Maritime patrol
Fokker F-27 Friendship	Netherlands India	Maritime patrol	MPA	2	Taken on dry-lease from Indian Airlines. Were based at Dum Dum Airport.

== See also ==
- List of equipment of the Indian Coast Guard
- List of future equipment of the Indian Coast Guard
- Future of the Indian Air Force
- Future of the Indian Navy
- Future of the Indian Army
