= List of equipment of the Indian Coast Guard =

Equipment of the Indian Coast Guard

Crest of the Indian Coast Guard

The Indian Coast Guard (ICG) is the maritime law enforcement and search and rescue agency of India. It was formally established on 18 August 1978. The ICG operates under the Ministry of Defence.

== Active Vessels ==
=== Vessels ===
Vessels belonging to the Indian Coast Guard bear the prefix "ICGS" – Indian Coast Guard Ship.

Class	Picture	Origin	Type	Commissioned	Displacement	Vessels	Comment
Pollution control vessels (4)
GSL class		India	Pollution control vessel	2026–present	4,100 tons	1	
Samudra class		India	Pollution control vessel	2010–present	3,960 tons	3	
Offshore patrol vessels (25)
Vikram class		India	Offshore patrol vessel	2018–present	2,140 tons	7	
Samarth class		India	Offshore patrol vessel	2015–present	2,400 tons	11	
Vishwast class		India	Offshore patrol vessel	2010–present	1,800 tons	3	
Sankalp class		India	Offshore patrol vessel	2008–present	2,325 tons	2	
Samar class		India	Offshore patrol vessel	1996–present	1,800 tons	2	2 ships out of 4 decommissioned in November 2023
Fast Patrol vessels (46)
Adamya class		India	Fast patrol vessel	2025–present	320 tons	5	
Aadesh class		India	Fast patrol vessel	2013–present	290 tons	20	
Rajshree class		India	Fast patrol vessel	2012–present	275 tons	13	1 additional unit built for the Seychelles Coast Guard.
Rani Abbaka class		India	Fast patrol vessel	2009–present	275 tons	5	
Sarojini Naidu class		India	Fast patrol vessel	2002–present	270 tons	1	6 units decommissioned by September 2026. 2 additional units built for the National Coast Guard of Mauritius.
Patrol boats (71)
Bharati class		India	Patrol boat	2013–present	107 tons	6	9 more to be commissioned
L&T class		India	Fast interceptor boat	2012–present	90 tons	54	
ABG class		India	Fast interceptor boat	2000–present	90 tons	11	
Patrol craft (14)
Timblo class		India	Interceptor craft	2010–present	7 tons	10	
Bristol class		United Kingdom	Interceptor craft	2004–present	5 tons	4	
Hovercraft (19)
Air Cushion Vehicles		India	Hovercraft	2026–present		1	6 on order. Replacement for Griffon 8000TD Flight I.
Griffon class		United Kingdom	Hovercraft	2000–present	27 tons	17	5 Griffon 8000TD Flight I (H-181 to 185). H-186 retired. Being replaced by Air Cushion Vehicles. 12 Griffon 8000TD Flight I (H-187 to 198). To be replaced by Heavy Duty Air Cushion Vehicles.
Harbour monitors (3)
Harbour class		India	Fast Interceptor Boats	2000–present	20 tons	3	
Barges (8)
Auxilary Barge		India	Resupply Barge			8	The Indian Coast Guard operates a fleet of Six Auxilary Barges to aid logistical and operational assistance to the Coast Guard fleet.: Urja Purti; Urja Prateek; Urja Shrota; Urja Sanchay; Urja Pravaha; Urja Prabha

== Active Aircraft ==
=== Aircraft ===
Aircraft	Picture	Origin	Type	Variant	In service	Notes
Maritime patrol
Dornier 228		West Germany; India	Maritime patrol	101/201	41	Further 8 ordered at a cost of ₹2,312 crore (US$240 million) on 12 February 2026.
Helicopters
HAL Dhruv		India	Utility	Mk. I	4	11 more Mk.III on order.
HAL Dhruv		India	Utility	Mk.III	19	11 more Mk.III on order.
HAL Chetak		India	Utility		19	

=== Squadrons and Flights ===
The following is a list of Coast Guard Air Squadrons

Squadron	Type	Base
CGAS 700	Do 228-101	CGAE Kolkata
CGAS 743	Do 228-101	CGAE Bhubaneswar
CGAS 744	Do 228-101	ICGAS Chennai
CGAS 745	Do 228-201	CGAE Port Blair
CGAS 746	Do 228-201	CGAE Porbandar
CGAS 747	Do 228-101	CGAE Kochi
CGAS 750	Do 228-101	CGAS Daman
CGAS 800	HAL Chetak	CGAE Dabolim
CGAS 830	HAL Dhruv Mk. III	CGAE Bhubaneswar
CGAS 835	HAL Dhruv Mk. III (Note: The third Dhruv Mk III squadron)	CGAE Porbandar
CGAS 840	HAL Dhruv Mk. III	CGAS Chennai
CGAS 841	HAL Chetak	CGAS Daman
CGAS 842	HAL Chetak	INS Kunjali, Mumbai
CGAS 845	HAL Dhruv Mk. III (Note: The second Dhruv Mk III squadron, four helicopters)	CGAE Kochi
CGAS 848	HAL Chetak	CGAS Chennai
CGAS 850	HAL Dhruv Mk. II	CGAS Ratnagiri
CGAS 851	HAL Dhruv Mk. II	CGAE Dabolim
Port Blair Chetak Flight	HAL Chetak	CGAE Port Blair
Kochi Chetak Flight	HAL Chetak	CGAE Kochi
Vishakhapatnam Chetak Flight	HAL Chetak	CGAE Dega
Dornier Training Fleet	Do 228-201	CGAS Daman

== See also ==
- List of future equipment of the Indian Coast Guard
- List of historical equipment of the Indian Coast Guard
- List of active Indian Navy ships
- List of active Indian military aircraft
- List of equipment of the Indian Army
