= List of Indian shipbuilders and shipyards =

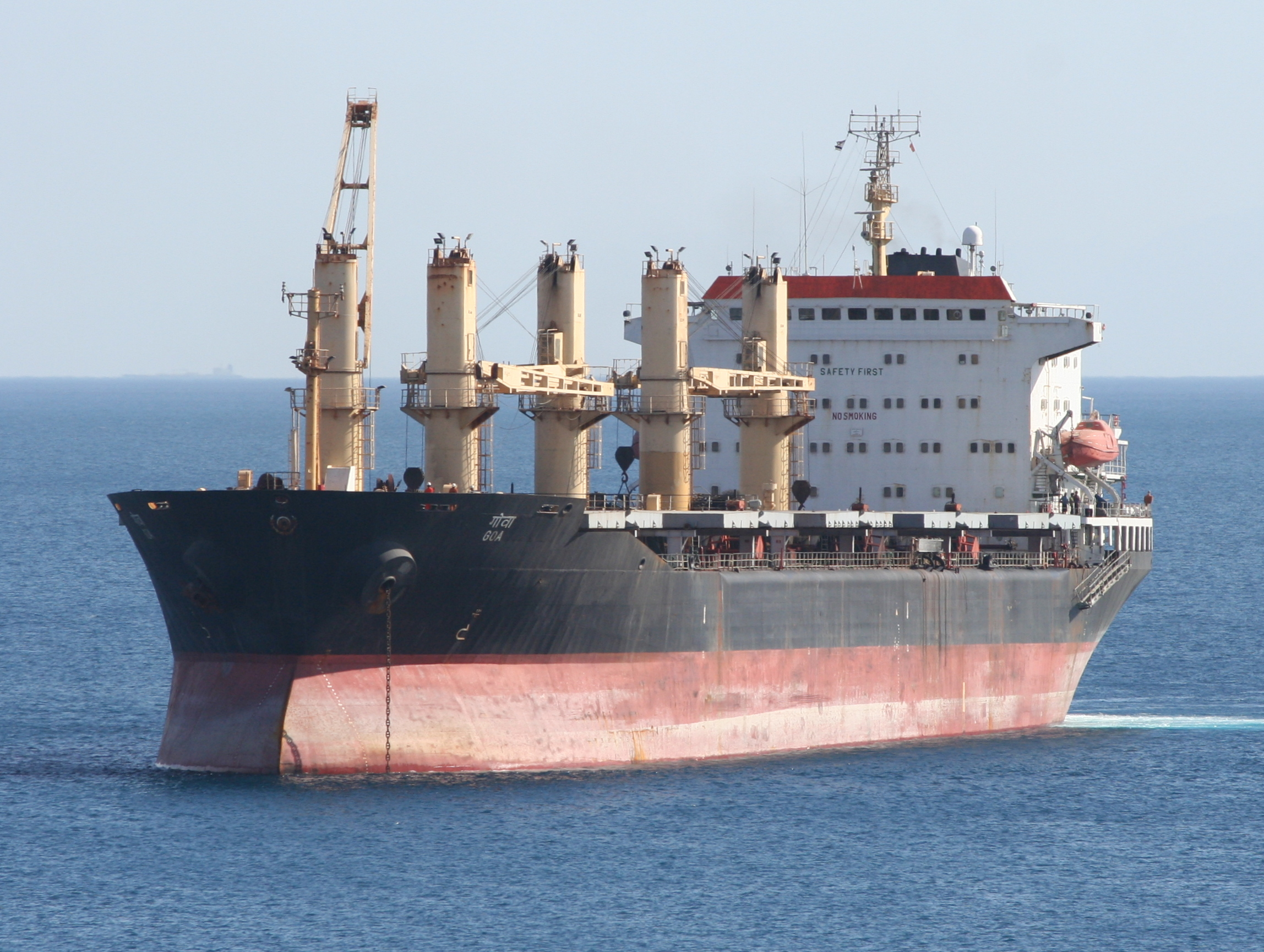
MV Goa built in 1997 in Hindustan Shipyard

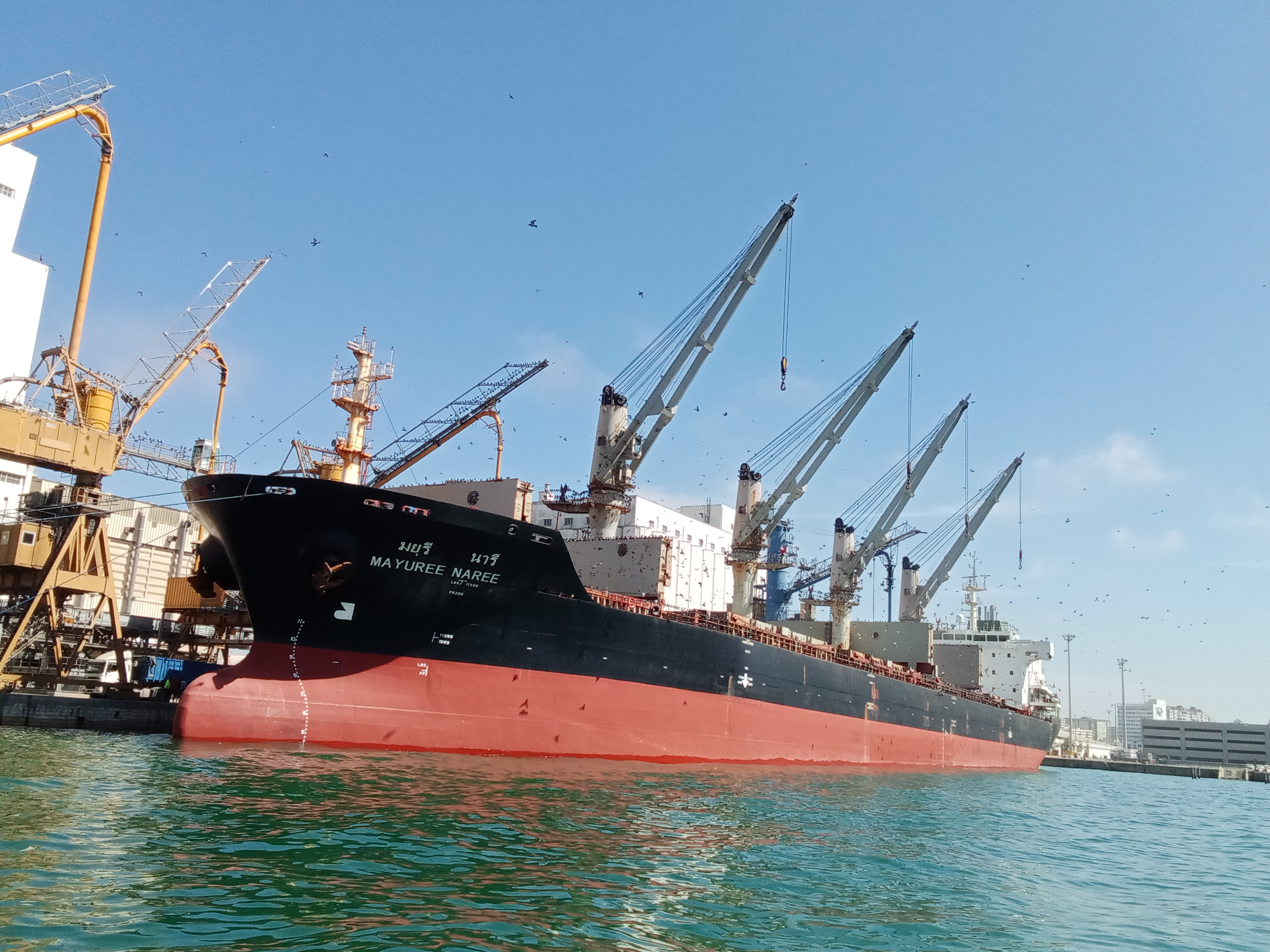
MV Mayuree Naree (2007)

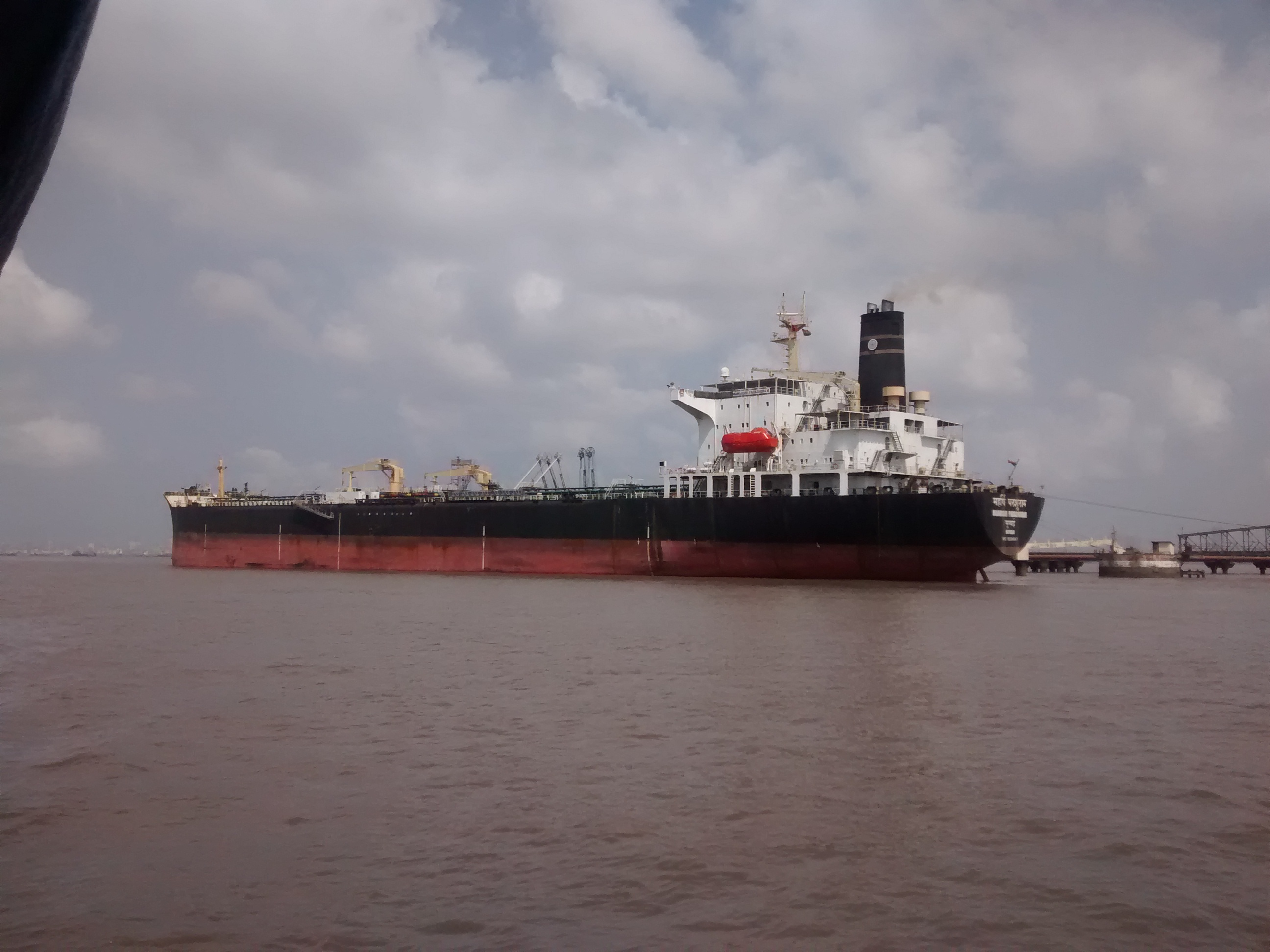
Maharishi Parshuram built in 2002 by Cochin Shipyard for SCI

In India Shipbuilding is an old sector where the various types of ship manufacturing currently. There are more than 700 Shipbuilders in India.SS Jala Usha, the first modern steamship of free India, was launched from the slipway of the Hindustan Shipyard Limited in Visakhapatnam on March 14, 1948. The first oil tanker built by Cochin Shipyard Limited (CSL) was the MV Rani Padmini, which was delivered in July 1981. This is a list of notable shipbuilders and shipyards located in India:

Name	Location	Type	Ownership	Notes
Naval Dockyard	Mumbai	State-owned	Government of India	
Bristol Boats	Kochi	Private		
Chowgule Shipyard - Drydock	Ratnagiri	Private	Chowgule Global	Chowgule Shiprepair Pvt Ltd - An Advanced Syncrolift Facility
Cochin Shipyard Limited	Kochi	State-owned	Government of India	Subsidiaries - Hooghly Cochin Shipyard Limited, Udupi Cochin Shipyard Limited
Dempo Shipbuilding & Engineering Private Limited	Goa	Private	Dempo Group	Subsidiaries - Modest Infrastructure Limited
Earnest Shipping and Shipbuilders Ltd.	Mumbai	Private	Earnest John Group of Companies	
Garden Reach Shipbuilders & Engineers	Kolkata	State-owned	Government of India	Subsidiaries - Rajabagan Dockyard
Goa Shipyard Limited	Goa	State-owned	Government of India	
Amrut Shipbuilding Private Limited	Mumbai	Private		"Amrut Shipbuilding Private Limited".
Hindustan Shipyard Limited	Visakhapatnam	State-owned	Government of India	
Kattupalli Shipyard	Chennai	Public	Adani Ports & SEZ	
Mandovi Drydocks	Goa	Private		
Marine Operating Company Private Limited	Goa	Private	MOC Shipyard, Australia	
Mazagon Dock Shipbuilders Limited	Mumbai	State-owned	Government of India	
Naval Dockyard	Visakhapatnam	State-owned	Government of India	
Navalt Solar and Electric Boats	Kochi, Alapuzha, Ayodhya	Private	Navalt Group	India's largest electric boat manufacturer
Navgathi Marine	Alapuzha	Private	Navalt Group	
Praga Marine Private Limited	Kochi	Private		
Rohini Shipyard	Rohini	Private	DAS Offshore	
San Marine	Kakinada	Private		
Samudra Shipyard Pvt Ltd	Alappuzha	Private		Leading FRP Boat Builders in Kerala
Sea Blue Shipyard Limited	Kochi	Private		
SHOFT Shipyard	Bharuch	Private	SHOFT Industries	
The Shalimar Works (1980) Limited	Kolkata	State-owned	Government of West Bengal	
Yeoman Shipyard	Ratnagiri	Private	Yeoman Marine Service Pvt Ltd	Youngest Shipyard of India
Square Port Shipyard	Usgaon Dabhol Maharashtra	Private	Square Port Shipyard Pvt Ltd	www.squareportshipyard.com
Swan Defence and Heavy Industries	Port Pipavav	Public	Swan Energy	
Timblo Drydocks Private Limited	Goa	Private		
Titagarh Marine Limited	Barrackpore (near Kolkata)	Public	Titagarh Group	
Vadyar Boats	Chennai	Private		
Vypin Shipyard Pvt Ltd.	Kochi	Private		
