= Vikram-class patrol vessel (1983) =

Indian class of heavy patrol vessels

Vikram class
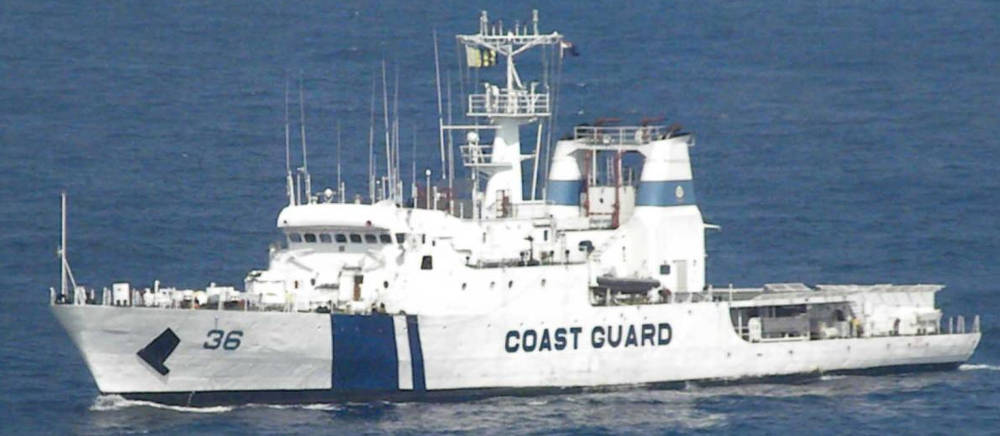
- ICGS Varuna

Class overview
- Builders: Mazagon Dock Limited; Goa Shipyard Limited
- Operators: Indian Coast Guard (historical); Sri Lanka Navy; Sri Lanka Coast Guard
- Succeeded by: Samar class
- Completed: 9
- Active: 2
- Retired: 7

General characteristics
- Displacement: 1180 tonnes
- Length: 74.10 m (243.1 ft)
- Beam: 11.4 m (37 ft)
- Draught: 3.2 m (10 ft)
- Installed power: 2 × SEMT-Pielstick 16 PA6 V280 diesel engines(4707KW each)
- Propulsion: 2 × propellers 12800 bhp
- Speed: 22 kn (41 km/h; 25 mph)
- Range: 8,500 nmi (15,700 km; 9,800 mi) at 16 kn (30 km/h; 18 mph)
- Complement: 10 officers and 98 sailors
- Sensors & processing systems: Radar : BEL make-1*Decca 1226 nav;BEL make-1*Decca 1230 nav
- Armament: 1 x 30mm 2A42; 2 x 12.7mm MG
- Aircraft carried: 1 x HAL Chetak

Vikram-class offshore patrol vessels are series of nine watercraft jointly built by Mazagon Dock Limited Mumbai and Goa Shipyard Limited, Vasco da Gama, Goa for the Indian Coast Guard.

== Introduction ==
The vessels in this class are 74 metres (243 ft) long with a beam of 11.4 metres (37 ft) and are armed with a Mantra Defense Lynx optronic-directed 40mm 60 cal Bofors Mk3 AA gun or dual 30mm CRN 91 Naval Gun. They are powered by two SEMT-Pielstick 16 PA6 V280 diesel engines driving two propellers. The vessels are equipped with pollution control equipment, two firefighting monitors, a four-tonne crane. They also carry diving equipment, two RIB inspection crafts, a grp launch, and a hangar for a light helicopter. The Vikram-class vessels have an air-conditioned accommodation for a crew of 11 officers and 85 enlisted sailors.

== List of vessels ==
Name	Pennant Number	Builder	Date of Launch	Date of commission	Date of Decommission	Status	Homeport
ICGS Vikram	33	Mazagon Dock	29 Sep 1981	26 Dec 1983	19 Jan 2012	Decommissioned	Vishakapatanam
ICGS Vijaya	34	Mazagon Dock		12 Apr 1985	23 Jan 2012	Decommissioned	Porbandar
ICGS Veera	35	Mazagon Dock	30 Jun 1984	3 May 1986	20 May 2013	Decommissioned	Tuticorin
SLCGS Suraksha (ex ICGS Varuna)	36	Mazagon Dock	1 Feb 1984	27 Feb 1988	23 August 2017 Transferred to SLCG	Active	(formerly, Kochi)
ICGS Vajra	37	Mazagon Dock	31 Jan 1987	22 Dec 1988	21 February 2018	Decommissioned	Paradip
ICGS Vivek	38	Mazagon Dock	5 Nov 1987	19 Aug 1989	Sank on 23 March 2010	Decommissioned	Visakhapatnam
ICGS Vigraha	39	Mazagon Dock	1 Dec 1988	12 Apr 1990	16 May 2019	Decommissioned	Paradip
ICGS Varad	40	Goa Shipyard	2 Sep 1989	19 Jul 1990	29 April 2017	Decommissioned	Port Blair
SLNS Sagara (ex ICGS Varaha)	41	Goa Shipyard		11 Mar 1992	Transferred to Sri Lanka Navy	Active	SLN Dockyard, Trincomalee (formerly, Chennai)

== See also ==
- Jija Bai-class patrol vessel
- Tara Bai-class coastal patrol vessel
- Priyadarshini-class patrol vessel
- Sarojini Naidu-class extra-fast patrol vessel
- Samar-class offshore patrol vessel
