= List of future equipment of the Indian Coast Guard =

This is a list of future equipment of the Indian Coast Guard, including ships and aircraft.

== Future vessels ==
The following is a table of vessel classes which are either under construction or planned, but have not yet entered service.

| Class | Origin | Type | Commission (est.) | Displacement | Planned | Comment |
|---|---|---|---|---|---|---|
| MDL-class Training Vessel | India | Training vessel | | 3200 tonnes | 1 | Contract signed: 17 Oct 23. Keel laid: 13 Jan 25. |
| GSL class | India | Pollution Control Vessel | May 2025 | 4,100 Tons | 2 | Contract signed for ₹5.83 billion in June 2021. Both ships were launched on 29 August 2024 and 23 July 2025, respectively. |
| Multi-Role Support Vessels | India | Multi-Role Support Vessels | | 2500 - 3500 Tons | 6 | (Note: RFI Document: https://indiancoastguard.gov.in/WriteReadData/Orders/202405220429539337681RFIforAcquisitionof06MRSVs-22May24.pdf) |
| Offshore Patrol Vessels (Operational Sea Training) | India | Offshore Patrol Vessel (OPV) | | ~2500 Tons | 2 | (Note: RFI document: https://indiancoastguard.gov.in/WriteReadData/Orders/202404030415322827464RFI02OPV(OST).pdf) |
| MDL class | India | Offshore Patrol Vessel (OPV) | May 2026 | 2,500 Tons | 6 | Contract signed with MDL. As of August 2025, steel cutting for first four vessels, with keel laying of the first vessel has been completed. The keel laying for the fourth vessel was conducted on 25 June 2026. |
| Next Generation FPV Class | India | Fast patrol vessel | | 700 Tons | 18 | The RFI was issued on 1 November 2017. Defence Acquisition Council (DAC) has cleared procurement on 3 September 2024. HSL has emerged as the L1 bidder. The contract is worth ₹3,000 crore (US$310 million). |
| Adamya-class fast patrol vessel | India | Fast patrol vessel | | 320 Tons | 8 | |
| MDL-class Fast Patrol Vessel | India | Fast patrol vessel | | 300 Tons | 14 | Contract signed with MDL on 24 January 2024. All to be delivered within 63 months |
| | India | Interceptor boats | | | 22 | Defence Acquisition Council (DAC) has cleared procurement on 29 July 2024. |
| Next Generation Interceptor Crafts | India | Interceptor boats | | 15 - 17 Tons | 30 | (Note: RFI Document: https://indiancoastguard.gov.in/WriteReadData/Orders/202407020344154932931RFIforAcquisitionof30NGICs.pdf) |
| Air Cushion Vehicles | India | | | | 6 | Deal signed on 24 October 2024 with Chowgule & Company Pvt. Ltd., Goa at a cost of ₹387.44 crore. Girder Laying and Commencement of Erection ceremony for first vessel, C-326, conducted on 30 July 2025 while the same for the final three vessels was conducted on 11 May 2026. C-326 was commissioned on 18 June 2026. |
| Heavy Duty Air Cushion Vehicles | India | Hovercraft | | | 12 | Defence Acquisition Council (DAC) has cleared procurement on 27 March 2026. |

== Future aircraft ==
| Aircraft | Origin | Type | Variant | Planned | Notes |
Maritime patrol
| Airbus C-295 Multi-Mission Maritime Aircraft (MMMA) | Europe; India | Maritime patrol | C-295MPA | 6 | Ministry of Defence has given clearance for procurement of 6 C-295 MPA on 16 February 2024. |
| HAL 228 | India | Maritime patrol | MPA | 8 | Eight additional units on order to augment current fleet. The deal worth₹2,312 crore was signed on 12th february 2026. |
Helicopters
| Twin Engine Heavy Helicopters (TEHH) | | Search and Rescue (SAR) | | 4 | Planned Acquisition |
| Naval Utility Helicopter | | Utility helicopter | | 25 | In August '25, the Ministry of Defence released an RFI for the procurement of 76 Naval Utility Helicopters meant for the Navy (51) and the Coast Guard (25). These will be assigned for roles like maritime SAR, CASEVAC, communication duties, and low-intensity maritime operations. While HAL is developing its 5.8-tonne Utility Helicopter-Marine, procurement from the US, France is also being considered as per reports. Adani Defence & Aerospace and Leonardo has jointly fielded the AW169M design which will be produced in India. |

== See also ==
- List of equipment of the Indian Coast Guard
- List of historical equipment of the Indian Coast Guard
- Future of the Indian Air Force
- Future of the Indian Navy
- Future of the Indian Army
