= Bristol-class interceptor craft =

Indian coast guard interceptor craft

Bristol class
History

General characteristics
- Displacement: 5.5 tonnes
- Length: 9.5 meters (31 feet)
- Beam: 3.3 meters (11 feet)
- Draught: 0.75 meters (2.5 feet)
- Propulsion: 2 diesel engine, 500 hp (370 kW)
- Speed: 35 knots
- Range: 75 nautical miles at 25 knots
- Complement: 2
- Armament: 1×7.62 mm machine gun

The Bristol class of interceptor craft are a series of watercraft built by Bristol Boats, a division of Chika Pvt. Ltd Aroor, for the Indian Coast Guard. These boats are intended for carrying out patrol duties in shallow water areas near the coastline. The contract was signed on 22 March 2004 for acquisition of eight Interceptor Boats by the Indian Coast Guard at a total cost of Rs 3.74 crores. The first craft became operational on 1 December 2004.

== See also ==
- Swallow Craft Class
- AMPL Class
- Griffon/Grse Class
- Mandovi Marine Class
- Timblo Class
