= Timblo-class patrol craft =

Cancelled Indian patrol boat class

Class overview
- Builders: Timblo Drydocks Private Limited
- Planned: 30
- Canceled: 30

General characteristics
- Type: Patrol boat
- Displacement: 15 tonnes
- Length: 13.1 m (43 ft)
- Beam: 4 m (13 ft)
- Draught: 1.1 m (3 ft 7 in)
- Installed power: 2 × 330 hp (250 kW)
- Speed: 25 knots (46 km/h; 29 mph)
- Armament: 1 × LMG gunmount

Timblo-class patrol crafts were to be a series of patrol boats built by Timblo Drydocks Private Limited, Goa.

== Description ==
Each boat in this series is 13.1 metres (43 ft) long and is made of fibre reinforced plastic. The boats are powered by twin motors of 330 horsepower (250 kW) each and have top speed of 25 knots (46 km/h; 29 mph). They are fitted with various navigation and communication equipment such as SART, EPIRB, GPS and VHF set etc.

== Order cancellation ==
A contract was concluded on 15 October 2009 for construction of 30 workboats between the Ministry of Defence (MOD) and M/s Timblo Dry Docks Pvt Ltd, Goa for the Indian Coast Guard at a cost of ₨41.54 crores, which was subsequently amended to ₨41.43 crores. As per the contract, the first workboat was to be delivered by 15 April 2011 and the subsequent workboats were to be delivered every three months each with the last workboat contractually due for delivery on 15 July 2018. The shipyard failed to deliver a single vessel and there has been no progress since June 2012. The shipyard finally submitted its inability to progress ahead with the project due to incorrect inputs from their original designer resulting non fitting of equipment as per provision of contract during the meeting held at MOD on 12 March 2013.

== See also ==
- AMPL Class
- Mandovi Marine (12.5-Meter) Class Patrol Craft
- Swallow Craft Class Inshore Patrol Vessel
- Timblo class interceptor craft
