= Next Generation Offshore Patrol Vessel (Indian Coast Guard) =

Indian Coast Guard offshore patrol vessel

Class overview
- Name: Next Generation Offshore Patrol Vessel
- Builders: Mazagon Dock, Mumbai, India
- Operators: Indian Coast Guard
- Preceded by: Vikram class
- Cost: ₹1,614.89 crore (equivalent to ₹18 billion or US$180 million in 2026); ₹269.14 crore (equivalent to ₹294 crore or US$30 million in 2026) per unit (FY 2023)
- Built: 2024 – present
- Planned: 6
- Building: 4
- Completed: 0

General characteristics
- Type: Offshore Patrol vessel
- Displacement: 3,000 t (2,953 long tons)
- Length: 117 m (383 ft 10 in)
- Beam: 16.4 m (53 ft 10 in)
- Draught: <4 m (13 ft 1 in)
- Propulsion: 2 × diesel engines; Controllable pitch propeller-based propulsion system
- Speed: >23 knots (43 km/h; 26 mph) (maximum); 14 knots (26 km/h; 16 mph) (cruise)
- Range: 6,000 nmi (11,000 km; 6,900 mi) at 14 knots (26 km/h; 16 mph) with 25% reserve fuel
- Endurance: 60 days
- Complement: 11 officers and 110 sailors
- Armament: 1 × main gun
- Aircraft carried: 1 × 10 t (9.8 long tons) helicopter with facility for UAVs
- Aviation facilities: Helipad with enclosed hangar (1 × multi-role helicopter or UAVs)

The Next Generation Offshore Patrol Vessel is a series of six offshore patrol vessel (OPVs) being built for the Indian Coast Guard by Mazagon Dock in Mumbai, Maharashtra.

== History ==
The next generation offshore patrol vessels are a follow on of Vikram class. Unlike, the previous offshore patrol vessels in service with the coast guard, the MDL class will be the largest patrol vessel with a length of 115 m (377 ft 4 in) and a displacement of 3,000 t (2,953 long tons).

The contract for the offshore patrol vessel was signed by Ministry of Defense for Indian Coast Guard on 20 December 2023 with Mazagon Dock Shipbuilders. The total value of the contract was kept at ₹1,614.89 crore (equivalent to ₹19 billion or US$190 million in 2026) or ₹269.14 crore (equivalent to ₹294 crore or US$30 million in 2026) per unit (FY 2023).

The primary aim for the procurement is to bolster Indian Coast Guard capability to carry our constabulary role and further strengthen search and rescue, pollution response, human and disaster response, anti smuggling and anti-piracy, ocean surveillance and monitoring of Sea lines of communication (SLOCs). and other coast guard duties. The other major benefit from the project is to fortify marine policing and boost the local shipbuilding capability by manufacturing the ship in-house by Mazagon Dock.

Four of these ships will replace the aging Samar class and the remaining two will further bolster the Indian coast guard capability.

On August 17, 2025, reports suggest that the Philippine Coast Guard is looking into possibly acquiring the vessels.

== Design ==
The vessels have a length of 115 metres (377 ft 4 in) and a beam of 16.4 metres (53 ft 10 in) with a design speed of over >23 knots (43 km/h; 26 mph). These vessels will be the largest ships in the Indian Coast Guard fleet at around 3,000 t (2,953 long tons).

These vessels will be equipped with twin Controllable Pitch Propellers driven by 2 diesel engines providing 9000 kW of combined power. The ship will have a provision of a Helo deck and helo hangar for stowage and operation of one integral HAL Dhruv with an all up weight (AUW) of 6 t (5.9 long tons) with further provision to house a 10 t (9.8 long tons) helicopter along with UAVs.

The ship will be equipped with 2 self contained articulated cranes of 2 tons lifting capacity along with 2 external fire fighting pumps with 1200 TPH capacity each. To tackle newer challenges these vessels will house multipurpose Drones, AI capability, and wireless controlled remote water rescue craft Lifebuoy, etc. enabling greater flexibility and operational edge to the ICG.

Some of the capabilities that the class of Offshore Patrol Vessels introduces to the Coast Guard fleet includes AI-based predictive maintenance, Remote Piloted Drones, Integrated Bridge System (IBS), and Integrated Platform Management System (IPMS).

These Multi-role State-of-the-Art vessels will be sea worthy to transits on all headings up to sea state 7. These ships will have dual certification of American Bureau of Shipping (ABS) and Indian Register of Shipping (IRS). These ships will adhere to MARPOL standards and have a service life of 30 years.

== Construction ==
The contract for the offshore patrol vessel was signed by Ministry of Defense on 20 December 2023 with Mazagon Dock Shipbuilders. The total value of the contract was kept at ₹1,614.89 crore (equivalent to ₹19 billion or US$190 million in 2026) The deal has a completion timeline of 66 months. The primary aim is to augment coast guard capability by introducing state of the facility and longer endurance to better tackle challenges arising at sea.

Construction began with the plate cutting ceremony for the first ship (Y16401) on 31 May 2024 with dignitaries from Indian Coast Guard gracing the occasion. Keel for the first OPV was laid down on 22 July 2025.

The work on the second ship (Y16402) began on 21 December 2024 coinciding with the construction of first FPV of Indian Coast Guard. Keel for the second and the third vessel was laid on 17 March 2026 at Yeoman Shipyard, Ratnagiri.

Commencement of the production of the third vessel (Y16403) was done along with the second vessel of FPV project on 24 March 2025.

The construction of the fourth vessel began on 20 August 2025, while the keel was laid on 25 June 2026.

The delivery of the project has been scheduled from 2027 onward, with the delivery of first and second ship is slated in May 2027 and December 2027 respectively.

== Ships in class ==
Name	Yard	Pennant No.	Steel Cutting	Keel Laid	Launched	Commissioned	Home Port	Status
Indian Coast Guard
—N/a	16401	—N/a	31 May 2024	22 July 2025	—N/a	May 2027	—N/a	Under construction
—N/a	16402	—N/a	21 December 2024	17 March 2026	—N/a	December 2027	—N/a	Under construction
—N/a	16403	—N/a	24 March 2025	17 March 2026	—N/a	—N/a	—N/a	Under construction
—N/a	16404	—N/a	20 August 2025	25 June 2026	—N/a	—N/a	—N/a	Under construction
—N/a	16405	—N/a	—N/a	—N/a	—N/a	—N/a	—N/a	Ordered
—N/a	16406	—N/a	—N/a	—N/a	—N/a	—N/a	—N/a	Ordered

either scheduled or estimated dates

== See also ==
- Future Equipment of the Indian Coast Guard
- Next Generation Offshore Patrol Vessel (Indian Navy)
