= Samar-class patrol vessel =

Patrol Vessel class of the Indian Coast Guard

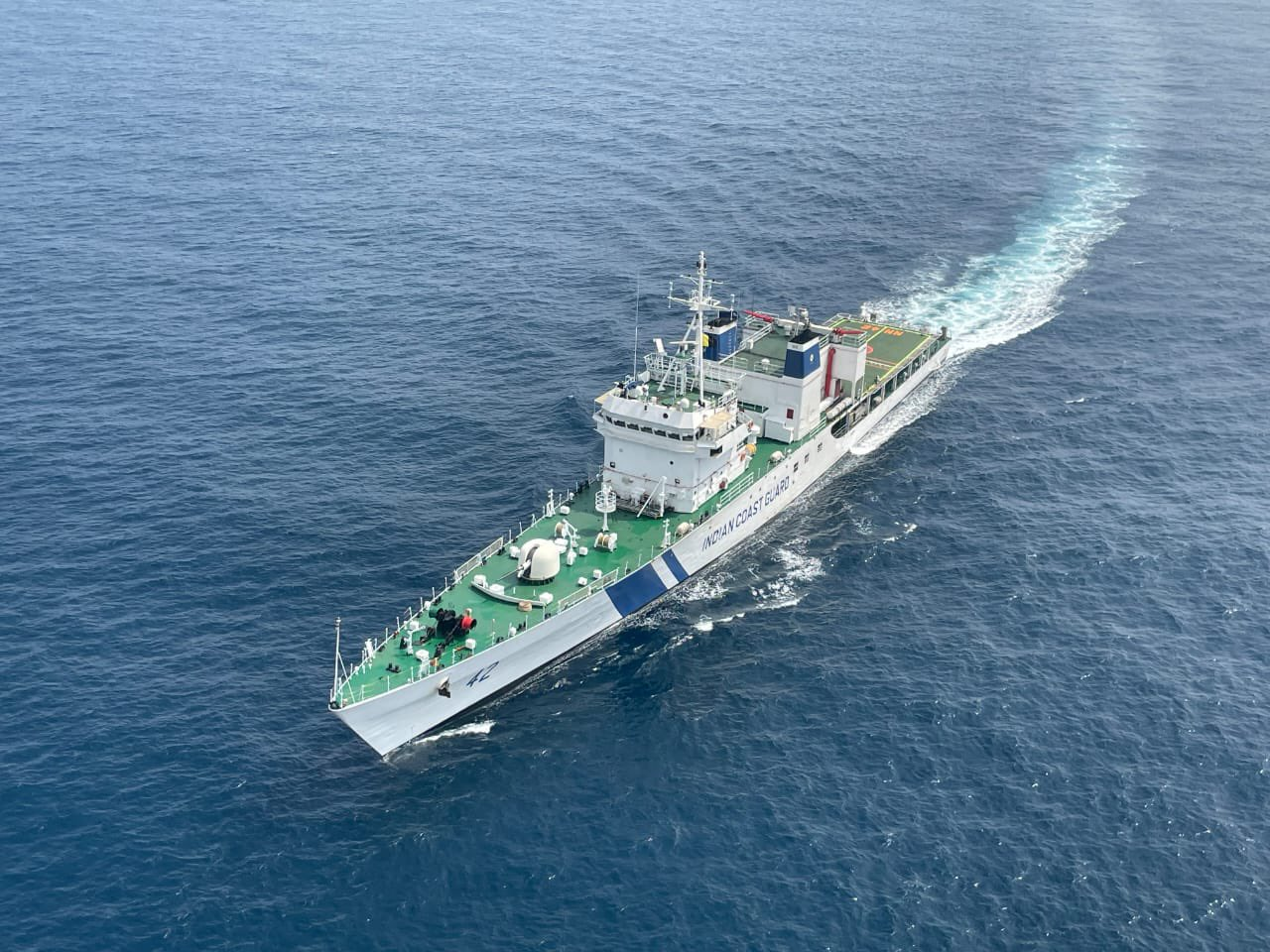
- Samar patrolling at sea

Class overview
- Name: Samar class
- Builders: Goa Shipyard Limited
- Operators: Indian Coast Guard
- Preceded by: Vikram class
- Succeeded by: Sankalp class
- Planned: 4
- Completed: 4
- Active: 2
- Retired: 2

General characteristics
- Type: Offshore patrol vessel
- Displacement: 1,800 t (1,800 long tons)
- Length: 102 m (334 ft 8 in)
- Beam: 11.5 m (37 ft 9 in)
- Draught: 3.4 m (11 ft 2 in)
- Propulsion: 2 x SEMT Pielstick 16 PA6V280 (4,707 kW or 6,312 hp each) diesel engines
- Speed: 22 knots (41 km/h; 25 mph)
- Range: 6,000 nmi (11,000 km; 6,900 mi) at 14 kn (26 km/h; 16 mph)
- Boats & landing craft carried: 5 boats
- Complement: 15 officers and 113 sailors
- Sensors & processing systems: Decca 2459 F/I-band surface search radar; BEL 1245 I-band navigation radar; BEL/Radamec optronic 2400 director
- Armament: 1 x 76 mm OTO Melara dual-purpose gun with EOFCS; 2 x 12.7 mm HMG
- Aircraft carried: 1 x Dhruv Advanced Light Helicopter OR; 1 x HAL Chetak

The Samar class of offshore patrol vessels are a series of five ships built by Goa Shipyard Limited, Vasco da Gama, Goa for the Indian Coast Guard.

== Design and description ==
The construction of vessels was ordered in April 1990 and these ships are half-sisters to seven Sukanya-class patrol vessel units in the Indian Navy. A total of twelve were originally planned and then cut to six. The vessels are intended for offshore patrol duties for the protection of oil platforms and the Indian exclusive economic zone.

The vessels in this class are 102 meters (334 ft 8 in) long with a beam of 11.6 meters (38 ft 1 in). They are powered by two Kirloskar-SEMT-Pielstick diesel engines (8,000 hp, 6,000 kW) driving two propellers and have a range 7,000 nautical miles (13,000 km; 8,100 mi) at a cruising speed of 15 knots (28 km/h; 17 mph). The Samar-class ships feature an Integrated Bridge System (IBS), Integrated Machinery Control System (IMCS), high power External Fire Fighting System, two Indian-built 30 mm gun mounts and one 76 mm OTO Melara dual-purpose gun. Besides, the ships are provided with a BEL-made onboard day/night infrared surveillance system to detect elusive targets which can evade radar detection due to their small radar cross-section (RCS) or higher sea state.

=== Capability ===
Each ship carries a single Dhruv Advanced Light Helicopter (ALH), with dedicated hangar and flight deck, and five high speed boats. The vessels also have towing capacity for salvage and Inmarsat satellite communications. They have accommodation for a crew of 12 officers and 112 enlisted sailors. Additional accommodation has also been provided for passengers.

== Operational history ==
On 25 August 2024, the Indian Coast Guard rescued 11 crew members from a sinking merchant vessel MV ITT Puma. The ship was travelling from Kolkata to Port Blair when it sank 90 nautical miles (170 km; 100 mi) south of Sagar Island due to adverse weather and sea environment. The search and rescue operation was conducted in coordination by ICGS Amogh (an Aadesh-class patrol vessel), ICGS Sarang and an ICG Dornier 228 aircraft.

Between 19 April and 14 August 2025, ICGS Sarang underwent a complicated Life Extension Refit (LER) by the Hindustan Shipyard. The ship was delivered three days ahead of schedule, in spite of the fact that the scope of the LER was increased by 35% midway which required higher number of spares and close coordination with the Indian Coast Guard, the operator. Major works included replacement of the stern tube and ‘A’ bracket bearings, renewing the shaft tunnel hull boss plates without removing the propeller shaft, and installing nine new pumps, all of which passed trials successfully. Routine tasks covered machinery, air conditioning and refrigeration, fire-fighting, and fuel systems. Additional work involved renewing 12 tonnes of steel, overhauling 140 motors, 300 valves, and 46 pumps, as well as replacing 3 km of pipelines.

== List of ships ==
Ships of the class
Name	Pennant	Builder	Laid down	Launched	Commissioned	Decommissioned	Homeport
ICGS Samar	42	Goa Shipyard	1990	26 August 1992	14 February 1996	5 November 2023	Kochi
ICGS Sangram	43	Goa Shipyard	1992	18 March 1995	29 March 1997	8 November 2023	Goa
ICGS Sarang	44	Goa Shipyard	1993	8 March 1997	21 June 1999		Chennai
ICGS Sagar	45	Goa Shipyard	1999	14 December 2001	3 November 2003		Chennai

== Gallery ==
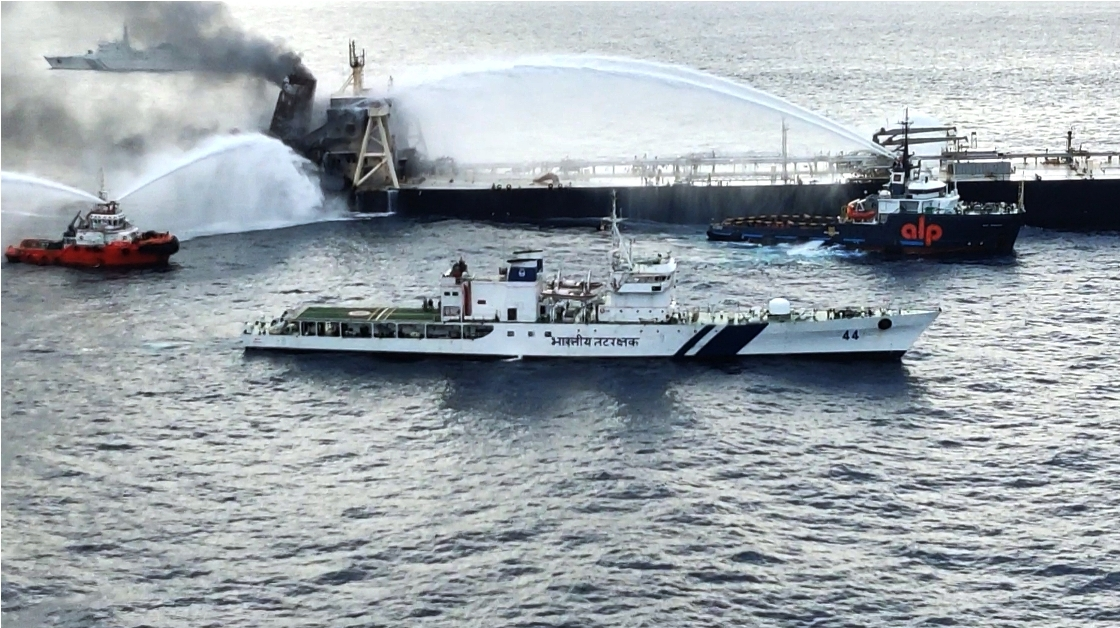
ICGS Sarang during fire dousing operation.

== See also ==
- Jija Bai-class patrol vessel
- Tara Bai-class patrol vessel
- Priyadarshini-class patrol vessel
- Sarojini Naidu-class patrol vessel
