= Anderson Marine =

External image
- Anderson Marine shipyard
- C-140 induction

Anderson Marine Pvt. Ltd. was a privately held shipbuilding company based in Vasco da Gama, Goa. It was mainly engaged in construction of Lloyds and Bureau Veritas classed barges, passenger ships, ferries, patrol boats, pilot boats and tugboats. It also had capability to construct boats with composite materials such as fibre-reinforced plastic. Its liquidation was ordered by a High Court on 22 June 2007. The units of M/s Anderson marine were later acquired on lease by Bharati Shipyard. An adjacent establishment Pinky Shipyard Pvt LTD has also been taken over by Bharati shipyard.

== Peers ==
- Praga Marine
- Vadyar Boats
- Bristol Boats

== Ships constructed ==
AMPL Class Interceptor Boat for Indian Coast Guard
