= Hooghly Cochin Shipyard Limited =

Shipbuilding and maintenance facility in India

- Type: Subsidiary
- Industry: Shipbuilding
- Founded: 2017; 9 years ago
- Headquarters: Kolkata, West Bengal, India
- Area served: India
- Key people: Shri Madhu S Nair (Chairman & Non-Executive Director); Shri Shekhar Chakravarty (CEO)
- Products: Ro-Ro Vessel; Ro-Pax; Water Metros; Ambulance Boats; Survey Class; OPV Class; Bangaram Class; FAC Class; FBOP; Tuna Liner
- Services: Ship design Shipbuilding; Ship repair
- Parent: Cochin Shipyard Ltd(100%)
- Website: hooghlycsl.com

Hooghly Cochin Shipyard Limited is a shipyard at Howrah, India. The company has two units located at Salkia and Nazirganj on the bank of River Hooghly in the city of Howrah (in the state of West Bengal, India). It manufactures various types of vessels, dredgers, floating drydock, oil pollution control vessels, passenger vessels, etc.

== Salkia Work ==
Salkia Work is one of the two units of the Hooghly Cochin Shipyard. The unit covers a 10-acre area. Salkia Work has one dry dock facility available along with 2 building berths. It manufactures a maximum size of vessels of 15,000 DWT.

== Nazirgunge Work ==
Nazirgunge Work is spread over an area of 19.60 acres. It has 2 building berths, workshops and administrative building and manufacturing maximum size of vessels of 15,000 DWT.

== Modernization ==
The Government of India planned to divest its majority stake in Hooghly Dock & Port Engineers Limited (HDPEL). Therefore, with a vision of reviving HDPEL the government brought in Cochin Shipyard as a strategic partner.

After getting acquired by Cochin Shipyard Limited, the company went on to modernize its shipbuilding facility at Nazirgunge, West Bengal at an estimated project cost of ₹169.76 crore, as per a document of the Ministry of Shipping. The modernized facility of Nazirgunge has been made well equipped for the construction of various types of vessels like Ro-Ro vessels, river-sea cargo vessels for bulk, liquids, containers, passenger vessels and other watercraft for the inland waterways.

CSL CMD Madhu S Nair on inaugural ceremony of refurbished Nazirgunge facility said that CSL at a later stage has plans to take up the modernisation of the facility at Salkia and turn it into a repair and refurbishment unit for river vessels. CSL already operates two ship repair unit for larger vessels at Kolkata Port's Netaji Subhas Docks.

To provide a major boost to the economic growth in the North-Eastern region, the Inland Water Authority of India and Hooghly Cochin Shipyard Limited signed an MoU for setting up the new 'Ship Repair Facility' at Pandu.

== See also ==
- List of shipbuilders and shipyards in India
- Cochin Shipyard Limited, Cochin
- Garden Reach Shipbuilders & Engineers, Kolkata
- Titagarh Wagons, West Bengal
- Mazagon Dock Shipbuilders, Mumbai
- Hindustan Shipyard, Visakhapatnam
- Shalimar Works (1980) Ltd, Howrah
- Goa Shipyard
- Inland Waterways Authority of India
- Shyama Prasad Mukerjee Port, Kolkata
