= Rajhans-class patrol vessel =

Indian patrol vessel class

Class overview
- Name: Rajhans class
- Builders: Garden Reach Shipbuilders & Engineers, Kolkata
- Operators: Indian Coast Guard
- Preceded by: Pulicat-class patrol boat
- Succeeded by: Jija Bai-class patrol vessel
- In commission: 1980-2011
- Planned: 5
- Completed: 5
- Active: 0
- Retired: 5

The Rajhans-class patrol vessels are series of five patrol vessels built by Garden Reach Shipbuilders & Engineers, Kolkata for Indian Coast Guard .

== Design ==
The vessels in this series are 37.8 metres (124 ft 0 in) long with a beam of 7.5 metres (24 ft 7 in) and are armed with 40 mm 60 cal Bofors Mk 3 AA and 2 single 7.62 mm machine guns. They are powered by Two 38 TB92 MTU diesels engines generating 6,820 brake horsepower (5,090 kW) and driving two propellers. The Rajhans-class vessels have an accommodation for a crew of 28 enlisted sailors. They have a range 1,400 nautical miles (2,600 km; 1,600 mi) at 14 knots (26 km/h; 16 mph). The hull's design is essentially the same as of Seaward Defence Boats (SDB) Mk 2 class in service of Indian Navy.

== Ships of the class ==
Name	Pennant Number	Date of commission	Status
ICGS Raj Hans	56	1980	
ICGS Raj Tarang	57	1981	
ICGS Raj Kiran		1984	Active
ICGS Raj Kamal			Active
ICGS Raj Shree	60		

== Specification ==
- Displacement : 200 t
- Length : 37.80 m
- Beam : 7.50 m
- Draught : 1.85 m
- Armament : 40 mm 60 cal Bofors Mk 3 AA, 2 single 7.62 mm MG
- Electronic Radar : BEL make-1*1245 nav.
- Power : 2 MTU 16V538 TB92 diesels,
- Propulsion : 2 propeller, 6,820 bh
- Range : 1400 nmi at 14 kn
- Crew : 28 enlisted

== See also ==
- Rajshree-class patrol vessel
- Rani Abbakka-class patrol vessel
- Sarojini Naidu-class patrol vessel
- Priyadarshini-class patrol vessel
- Tara Bai-class patrol vessel
- Jija Bai-class patrol vessel
