= Bharati-class interceptor boat =

Indian patrol vessel class

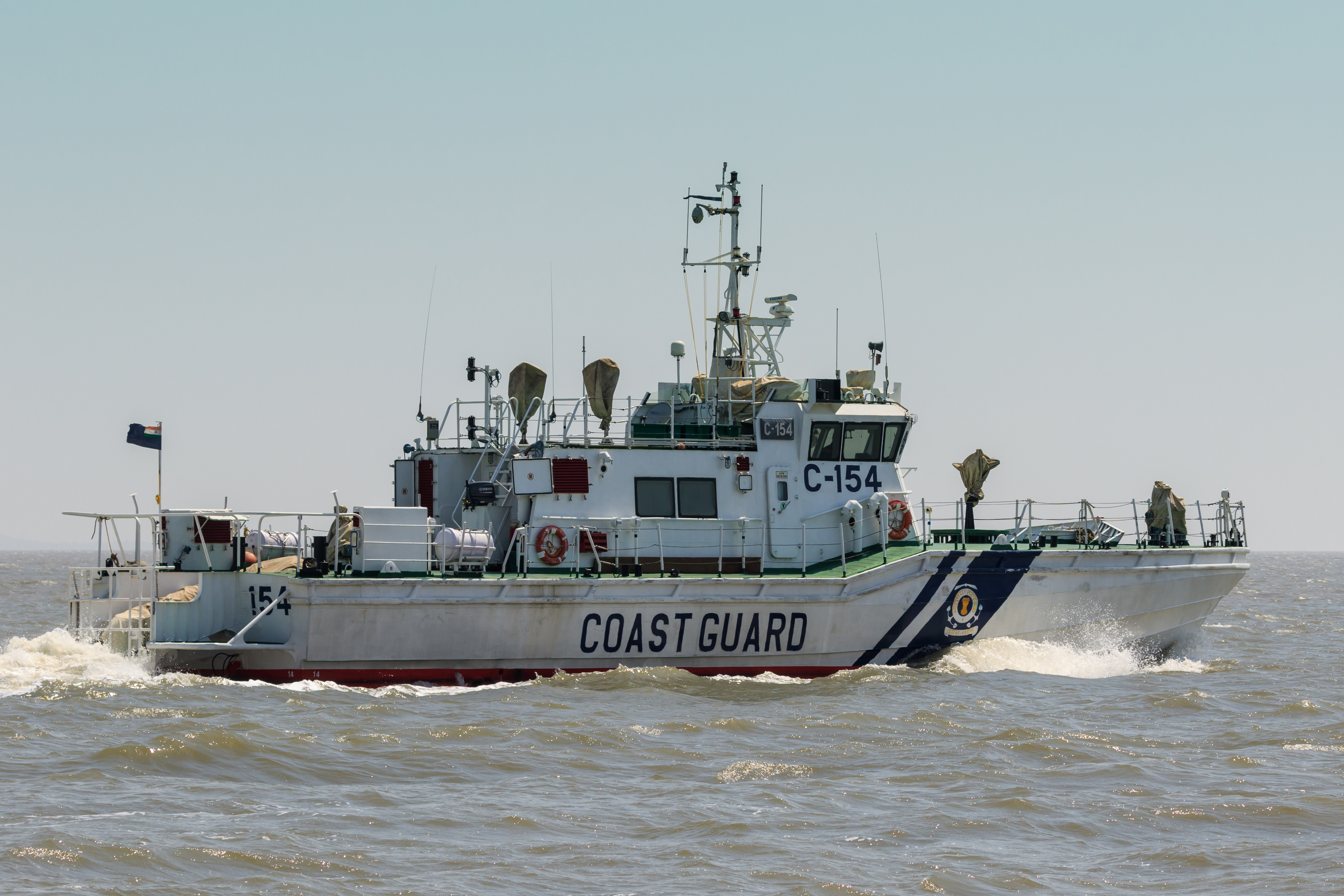
- Coast Guard Interceptor boat C-154

Class overview
- Name: Bharati-class interceptor craft
- Builders: Bharati Shipyard
- Operators: Indian Coast Guard
- Preceded by: AMPL-class interceptor boat
- Built: 2009–present
- In commission: 2013–present
- Planned: 15
- Building: 8
- Completed: 7
- Active: 6

General characteristics
- Type: Interceptor boat
- Displacement: 107 tonnes (105 long tons; 118 short tons)
- Length: 27.6 m (90 ft 7 in)
- Beam: 6.17 m (20 ft 3 in)
- Draught: 1.2 m (3 ft 11 in)
- Depth: 3.1 m (10 ft 2 in)
- Propulsion: 2 × Caterpillar MTU Friedrichshafen Gmbh 1630KW engines; 2 × 69 kW 415 V 50 Hz AC
- Speed: 35 knots (65 km/h; 40 mph)
- Complement: 1 officer and 12 enlisted

Bharati-class of interceptor boats are a series of fifteen watercraft being built by Bharati Shipyard for the Indian Coast Guard.

== Description ==
The vessels in the series have an aluminium hull, and have a length of 28 meters, with beam of 6 meters and draught of 1.2 meters. They are powered by twin MTU Caterpillar engines having capacity of 1630 kW each. They have Articulate Surface Piercing Propulsion and can attain a speed of more than 35 knots. The vessels can perform high-speed interception, close-coast patrol, low-intensity maritime operations, search-and-rescue and surveillance. They have a complement of one officer and 12 sailors. They are being constructed as per a ₹2.81 billion (US$29 million) contract signed with the Ministry of Defence, which was announced on 6 March 2009.

The first Bharati-class interceptor boat has IRS no. 40567 and its pennant no. is C-154. It was commissioned in Mumbai on 22 February 2013 in the presence of Maharashtra Chief Secretary J.K. Banthia and S.P.S. Basra, Inspector General (IG), Coast Guard Region (West). It was constructed by Bharati shipyards units at Vasco Da Gama.

== Ships of the class ==
Pennant No	Commissioned	Homeport
C-154	22 February 2013	Mumbai
C-155	14 May 2015	Karwar
C-156	12 March 2016	Pipavav
C-158	12 April 2016	Goa
C-161	5 January 2018	Vadinar
C-162	30 May 2018	Vizhinjam

== See also ==
- Cochin Fast Patrol Vessels
- L&T fast interceptor craft
- ABG fast interceptor craft
- Swallow Craft Class
- AMPL Class
