= Bristol Boats =

Bristol Boats is an Indian fiberglass boat manufacturer and marine engineering service provider. It is located in the backwaters of Cochin at Aroor Industrial Development Area, Alappuzha District, Kerala. It is a division of M/s Chika Private Limited headquartered at Mumbai.

== History ==
Bristol Boats was established in 1976 by the Ghia family with technology and know-how assistance from Bristol Yachts, Rhode Island, USA and subsequently Hunt Railton International Inc., USA. Since then, the company has manufactured various types and sizes of boats for both domestic and international clients.

== Facilities ==
The facility at Aroor is capable of manufacturing yachts up to 25 meters. It has a fully air-conditioned fibre-reinforced plastic molding shop. It also has carpentry shop and machine shop. The shop floors are designed for line production. In addition to its manufacturing operations, Bristol Boats also offer repair and retrofitting services.

== Products ==
Bristol boats builds a range of boats, including trawler type luxury boats, patrol boats, interceptor crafts, survey boats, passenger boats, whaleboats, survey vessels, pilot boats and Pollution control boats.

== Peers ==
- Vadyar Boats
- Praga Marine
- Anderson Marine

== See also ==
- Bristol Class Interceptor Craft
