= Timblo Drydocks Private Limited =

Timblo Drydocks Private Limited is a privately owned shipbuilding company based in Goa, India. It was established in the early 1970s and owns a shipyard having area of 10 hectares located on the left banks of the River Zuari in Goa, with a water frontage of more than 350 metres (1,150 ft) and is equipped with two slipways and one assembly bay with side launching facilities.

== Capabilities ==
Timblo manufactures various type of inland vessels such as twin screw dry cargo barges, pontoons, dredgers, passenger launches, small floating jetties, etc. Timblo also constructs ocean-going crafts and multi-purpose vessels of up to 8000 DWT and 118 metres (387 ft) LOA. These also include, OSVs, PSVs, AHVs and various other specialised vessels.

Timblo also manufactures fiber-reinforced plastic boats such as patrol crafts, luxury boats. It owns a floating dry dock on the southern banks of Dabhol creek in Maharashtra, with up to 200 acres (81 ha) of land and a 1.2 km (0.75 mi) water frontage. It is mainly a repair facility.

=== Ships constructed ===
- Timblo class interceptor craft
- Timblo class patrol craft

=== Peers ===
- ABG Shipyard
- Modest Infrastructure Ltd
- Tebma Shipyard Limited
- Shalimar Works (1980) Ltd
