= Praga Marine =

Indian boat manufacturing company

Praga Marine Pvt. Ltd. is a fiberglass boat manufacturing company. It owns a boatyard, located in the backwaters of Cochin at Aroor Industrial Development Area, Allappuzha District It was incorporated in 1985 and commenced business from that boatyard in 1988. It is promoted by Joe Nejedly. His father Josef Nejedly, a Prague-born Czech national was a pioneer of the fibre glass industry in India during the 1960s.

== Products ==
Praga Marine manufactures various types of fibre-reinforced plastic boats such as rigid-hulled inflatable boats, catamarans and sailboats. The company specializes in large catamarans. In 2003, it built a very large 32 meter catamaran, MV Vrinda for the Oberoi Hotels as a 5-Star cruise ship, which is one of the largest FRP vessel in India. Praga Marine also serially manufactures the Arrow and Lancer brand speedboats, of which over 250 have been sold as of 2011.

External images
- Praga Marine's Products
- MV Vrinda Catamaran
- Arrow 6 Seater
- Lancer 10 Seater

=== Ships constructed ===
- Praga class patrol boat for National Coast Guard (NSG) organisation, Mauritius

==== Peers ====
- Anderson Marine
- Bristol Boats
- Navgathi Boatyards
- Vadyar Boats
