= GSL-class pollution control vessel =

Pollution control vessels in service with the Indian Coast Guard

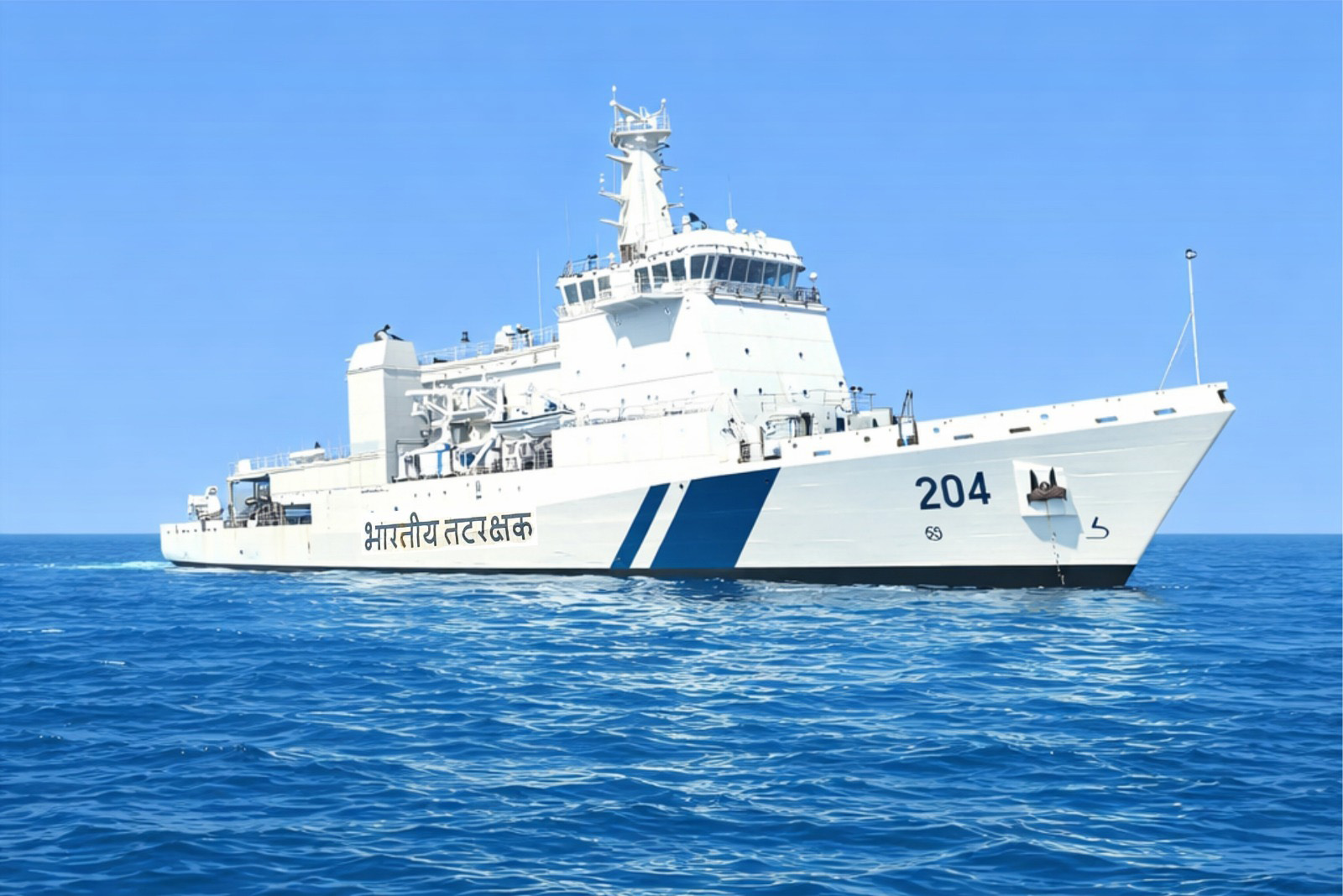
- ICGS Samudra Pratap at sea

Class overview
- Builders: Goa Shipyard Limited
- Operators: Indian Coast Guard
- Preceded by: Samudra class
- Cost: ₹583 crore (equivalent to ₹618 crore or US$64 million in 2023); ₹291.5 crore (equivalent to ₹309 crore or US$32 million in 2023) per unit (FY 2022)
- Built: 2022 – present
- Planned: 2
- Building: 1
- Completed: 2
- Active: 1

General characteristics
- Type: Pollution control vessel
- Displacement: 4,170 t (4,104 long tons)
- Length: 114.5 m (375 ft 8 in)
- Beam: 16.4 m (53 ft 10 in)
- Draught: 4.5 m (14 ft 9 in)
- Propulsion: 2 × diesel engines; Controllable pitch propeller-based propulsion system
- Speed: 22 knots (41 km/h; 25 mph) (maximum)
- Range: 6,000 nmi (11,000 km; 6,900 mi)
- Endurance: 5 days
- Complement: 14 officers and 115 sailors
- Armament: 1 × CRN 91 naval gun; 2 × 12.7 mm stabilised remote-control gun

The GSL-class pollution control vessel is a series of two pollution control vessels (PCVs) being built for the Indian Coast Guard by Goa Shipyard Limited in Vasco da Gama, Goa.

== History ==
The GSL-class pollution control vessel is a follow on of Samudra class. Unlike, the Samudra-class vessels which were built on a foreign design, the GSL class is a complete in-house design with over 72% indigenous content and built at Goa Shipyard, Goa, India.

The contract for the pollution control vessel was signed by Ministry of Defence for Indian Coast Guard on 22 June 2021 with Goa Shipyard with a completion timeline of 48 months. The total value of the contract was kept at ₹583 crore (equivalent to ₹618 crore or US$64 million in 2023) or ₹291.5 crore (equivalent to ₹309 crore or US$32 million in 2023) per unit (FY 2022).

The primary aim for the procurement is to augment Indian Coast Guard capability to tackle pollution response on the eastern front of India and ecologically sensitive zone of the Andaman and Nicobar Islands. The other major benefit from the project is to strengthen the local shipbuilding capability and bolster local Micro, Small and Medium Enterprise (MSME) by involving more than 200 vendors in this project development.

== Design ==
GSL-class vessels have a length of 114.5 metres (375 ft 8 in) and a beam of 16.4 metres (53 ft 10 in) with a design speed of over 22 knots (41 km/h; 25 mph). These vessels, will be equipped with state of the art equipment and computerized control systems, are state-of-the-art PCVs for the Indian Coast Guard.

The pollution response capabilities of the vessel will include an advanced radar with oil slick detection software, Oil Recovery Operation System (ORO System) with two Flush type integral side collector sweeping arms, Oil Spill Dispersant (OSD) Spray System, Ocean Booms, Near Shore Booms, Skimmers, RO stowage portable barges among many other state of the art features. The PCVs will be equipped with state-of-art technology, advanced and highly sensitive pollution control equipment, navigation and communication equipment, sensor and machinery. Ships will be capable of carrying out dedicated oil spill response operations for containment, recovery, separation and dispersal of pollutants. The vessel will be fitted with latest pollution control equipment including two flush type side sweeping arms enabling it to contain oil spill whilst in motion. An advanced software would assist in predicting the spread of the complex oil spill pattern and a dynamic positioning system will enable the vessel to be maneuvered in restricted areas with precision. The vessel is being designed to recover the lightest to the most viscous oil at the rate of 300 tons per hour. The vessels are also equipped with fire-fighting and salvage systems.

The ships have indigenous content of over 72%. In addition, these vessels will also be equipped with medium caliber guns with fire control systems and two main radars. The ships can be deployed with a helicopter and four high-speed boats for visit, board, search, and seizure (VBSS) operations as secondary roles. These are also the first ships to have two women officers as permanent staff.

== Construction ==
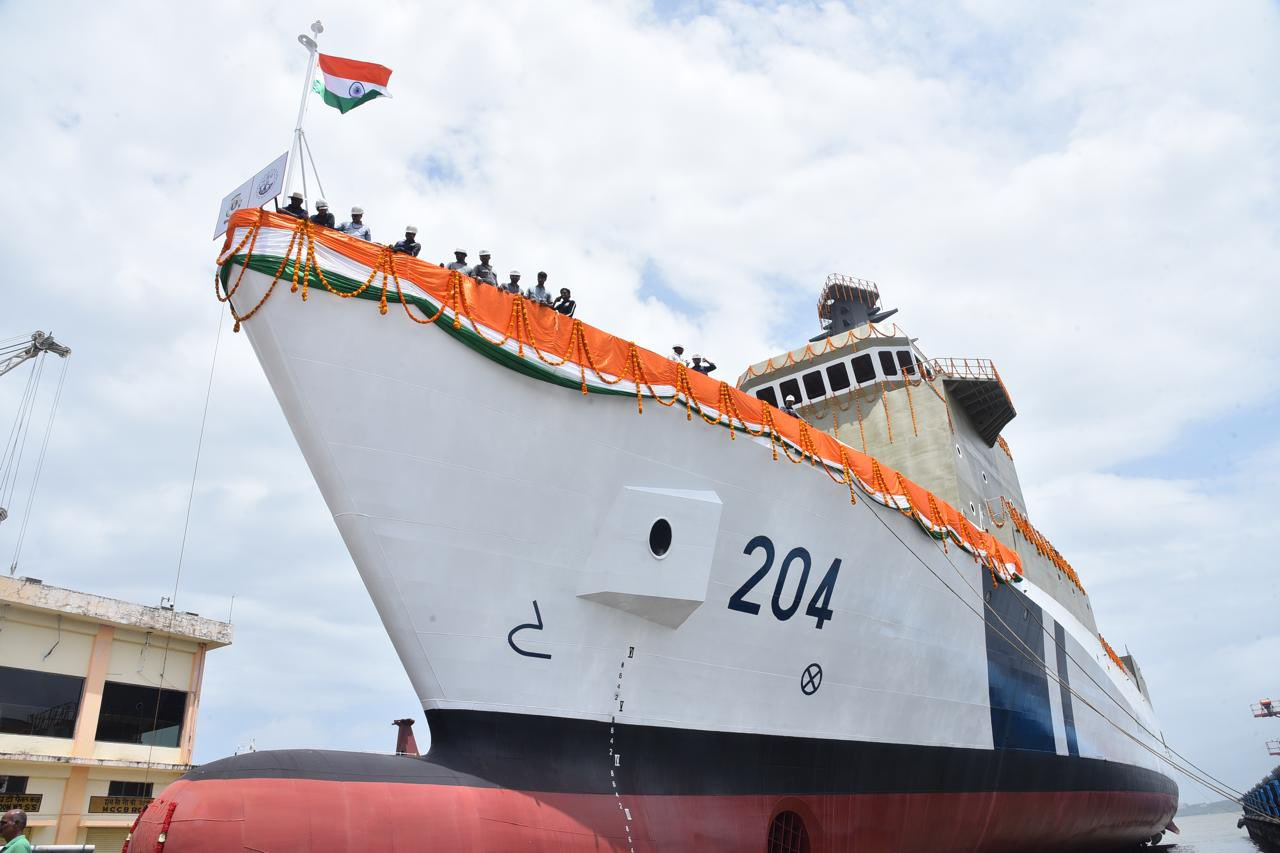
Launch of Samudra Pratap at Goa Shipyard

The deal was signed for the construction of two PCVs on 22 June 2021 with Goa Shipyard with a completion timeline of 48 months. The total value of the contract was kept at ₹583 crore (equivalent to ₹618 crore or US$64 million in 2023). The primary aim is to provide a clean and pollution free marine environment, these vessels have been designed and equipped with state of the art pollution response and control equipment.

Construction began on 23 February 2022 with the plate cutting ceremony of both the ships. The then IG and current Director general Paramesh Sivamani presided over the ceremony. The keels for both the ships Y1267 and Y1268 were laid on 21 November 2022 in the presence of the then Director general Virender Singh Pathania with expected delivery date of February 2025 and August 2025 respectively. The first ship of the class Samudra Pratap was launched on 29 August 2024, making this a key milestone of being the first indigenously designed and constructed pollution control vessel in India. The second ship of the class Samudra Prachet was launched on 23 July 2025 in the presence of the Director General of the Indian Coast Guard Paramesh Sivamani. The delivery of both the ships has been considerably delayed from the original timeline of February 2025 and August 2025.

The first ship, Samudra Pratap (204), was delivered to the Indian Coast Guard on 23 December 2025 and was inducted the following day. It is the largest ship in the Coast Guard.

== Ships in class ==
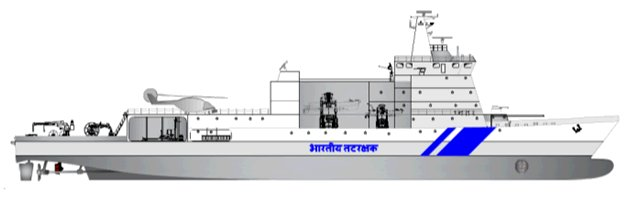
Graphic profile of GSL class Offshore pollution control vessel.

Name	Yard	Pennant	Steel Cutting	Keel Laid	Launched	Delivered	Commissioned	Home Port	Status
Indian Coast Guard
Samudra Pratap	1267	204	23 February 2022	21 November 2022	29 August 2024	23 December 2025	5 January 2026	Kochi	Active
Samudra Prachet	1268	205	23 February 2022	21 November 2022	23 July 2025	—N/a	2026	—N/a	Launched

either scheduled or estimated dates

== See also ==
- Future Equipment of the Indian Coast Guard
