= Mandovi Marine (12.5 meter)-class patrol craft =

Mandovani Marine (12.5-Meter) class of patrol crafts are a series of five watercraft built by Mandovi Marine Pvt LTD, Indore for Indian Coast Guard during the 1980s .

== Description ==
The crafts have a modified deep 'vee' hull, which is made of Glass-reinforced plastic and is fitted out with accommodation forward and the wheelhouse amidships. These boats are powered by twin Cummins diesel engines, which are linked to Hamilton water-jet units and a platform aft of the transom offers protection to these drive units. This gives a speed of 18 knots at the normal displacement of 10 tonnes. The fuel carrying capacity of the crafts is 800 liters. A high-speed version, Mandovi Marine (15 meter) class patrol craft are in service of Mauritius and Islamic Republic of Mauritania.

=== Specification ===
- Displacement : 10 tonnes
- Length : 12.5 meter
- Breath : 3.5 meter
- Draught : 0.8 meter
- Power : 2 Cummins diesels, 275 hp each
- Propulsion : 2 Hamilton waterjets, 550 bh
- Fuel : 800 Litres

== See also ==
- Swallow Craft Class
- AMPL Class
- Griffon/Grse Class
- Timblo Class
- Bristol Class
