= Vadyar Boats =

Vadyar Boats Pvt. Ltd. is a Chennai-based boat manufacturer and marine service provider.

== History and current activities ==
M/s Vadyar Boats was established in Chennai in 1969 by Late Shri P.A. Ramakrishnan, a renowned naval architect, first-generation entrepreneur, and social worker. It is a family owned concern and pioneer in the manufacture of FRP (fibre-reinforced plastic) Lifeboats in India. The company started initially with supply of wooden Fishing and small FRP Lifeboats and during this period M/s Shipping Corporation of India, largest public sector shipping company started replacing Metal with FRP Lifeboats on their ships. After inaugurating their modern boat building yard at the 400 acre Guindy Industrial Estate in Chennai on 31 January 1976, supplied various types of FRP Open Lifeboats indigenously to various shipyards and shipping companies in India and abroad certified by Ministry of Shipping, Government of India, Lloyd's Register of Shipping, London and other International Classification Societies. Prominent being the export of 12 Lifeboats to M/s Centramor Shipyard, Poland in 1979 and 24 Lifeboats to M/s Daewoo Shipbuilding and Heavy Machineries Ltd, South Korea in 1984.

The International Maritime Organisation, London amended SOLAS (Safety of Life at Sea) regulations with effect from 1 July 1986 with far reaching consequences as it introduced new rules for use of Lifeboats on ships particularly Oil and Gas Carriers etc., which proved to be a turning point. Successfully indigenously designed and manufactured the 8-metre 50-person capacity FRP Totally Enclosed Fire Protected Lifeboat after conducting all the prototype tests including the most severe fire test in the very first attempt achieved by only a few Lifeboat builders globally. For this purpose, the Lifeboat was placed in a specially erected concrete tank located in the outskirts of Chennai without human habitation, filled with 3,400 L of kerosene and petrol and burned for a continuous period of 14 minutes with a couple of mice kept inside the boat. Received the coveted National Award for Indigenous design and development from the Government of India on 14 December 1992.

Have supplied more than 500 FRP Boats including various types of Lifeboats, fast, MOB Rescue Boats, high speed Interceptor Crafts, Passenger Launches, Mooring Launches, On-Load Release Gears and Davits (Launching Appliances). Significant among them being the supply of 8 nos high speed FRP Interceptor Crafts fitted with 120 BHP Simpson P6 354 Marine Diesel Engines to the Indian Coast Guard in September 1988 certified by the Indian Register of Shipping for patrolling off the Rameshwaram Coast in Southern India and the 11-metre 25-passenger capacity high speed FRP Launch fitted with twin 200 BHP Volvo Penta Marine Diesel Engines for inter island services in Andaman & Nicobar in February 1997 complying with the stringent Dynamically Supported Craft regulations and certified as a Passenger Vessel by Ministry of Shipping, Government of India.

Due to increase in the number of accidents on Ships globally caused by improper maintenance of Lifeboats and Davits (Launching Appliances), The International Maritime Organisation in May 2006 regulated the servicing and testing of the Lifeboats, On-Load Release Gears, Rescue Boats and Davits stipulating them to be carried out only by the Original Equipment Manufacturer or their authorised service providers. Have been carrying out service, maintenance and repairs of Vadyar make and also other makes of Open, Totally Enclosed Lifeboats, Rescue Boat and Davits at various ports in India and Sri Lanka.

Among the various socially responsible initiatives undertaken by Late Shri P.A. Ramakrishnan during his tenure as managing director were the donation of 58 acres of land to Bharatiya Vidya Bhavan, Mumbai for establishment of a Woman's College and other Institutions at the outskirts of Chennai in January 1997; establishing the CBSE affiliated Bharatiya Vidya Bhavan School in Mannapra Village, Palakkad district, Kerala after inauguration of Bhavan's Puthucode Kendra in his native village in October 2000; and opening the Bharatiya Vidya Bhavan Australia Centre at Sydney inaugurated by Shri Yashwant Sinha, then Minister for External Affairs, Government of India in August 2003.

=== Boats constructed ===
- FRP Interceptor Crafts for Indian Coast Guard Vadyar-class interceptor craft
- FRP Totally Enclosed Fire Protected Lifeboat
- FRP High Speed Passenger Launch
- FRP High Speed Boats

=== Peers ===
- Praga Marine
- Bristol Boats
