= Swallow Craft-class patrol vessel =

Retired class of Patrol vessels

Swallow Craft Class of Inshore Patrol Vessels are a series of watercraft built by South Korea's Kangnam/Swallow Craft, in Pusan for the Indian Coast Guard.

== Design ==
The vessels in this series are 20 meters long with a beam of 4.8 meters. The hull of each vessel is made of Fiber reinforced plastic (FRP) and they are armed with a 7.62 mm MG. They are powered by two 12V71 TA GM Detroit diesel engines, which generate 840 bhp and drive two propellers. The Swallow Craft class vessels have a crew of 8 enlisted sailors and have a range 400 nmi at 20 knots.They are also called as the Type-65 Design.

== Ships of the class ==
| Name | Pennant Number | Date of commission | Status |
|---|---|---|---|
| ICGS | C01 | 24-7-80 | |
| ICGS | C02 | 24-7-80 | Decommissioned on 24 Sep 2001 |
| ICGS | C03 | 24-7-80 | Stricken in 1996 |
| ICGS | C04 | 24-7-80 | |
| ICGS | C05 | 24-7-80 | |
| ICGS | C06 | 24-7-80 | Decommissioned on 24 Sep 2001 |
| ICGS | C62 | | Stricken in 2000 |
| ICGS | C63 | | |

== Specification ==
- Displacement : 32 tonnes
- Length : 20.0 meter
- Beam : 4.80 meter
- Draught : 1.3 meter
- Armament : single 7.62 mm MG
- Electronic Radar : 1* nav.
- Power : 2 GM Detroit Diesel 12V71 TA
- Propulsion : 2 propellers, 840 bh
- Range : 400 nmi at 20 kn
- Crew : 8 enlisted.

== See also ==
- AMPL Class
- Griffon/Grse Class
- Mandovi Marine Class
- Timblo Class
- Bristol Class
