= Griffon Hoverwork 8000TD =

Series of hovercraft

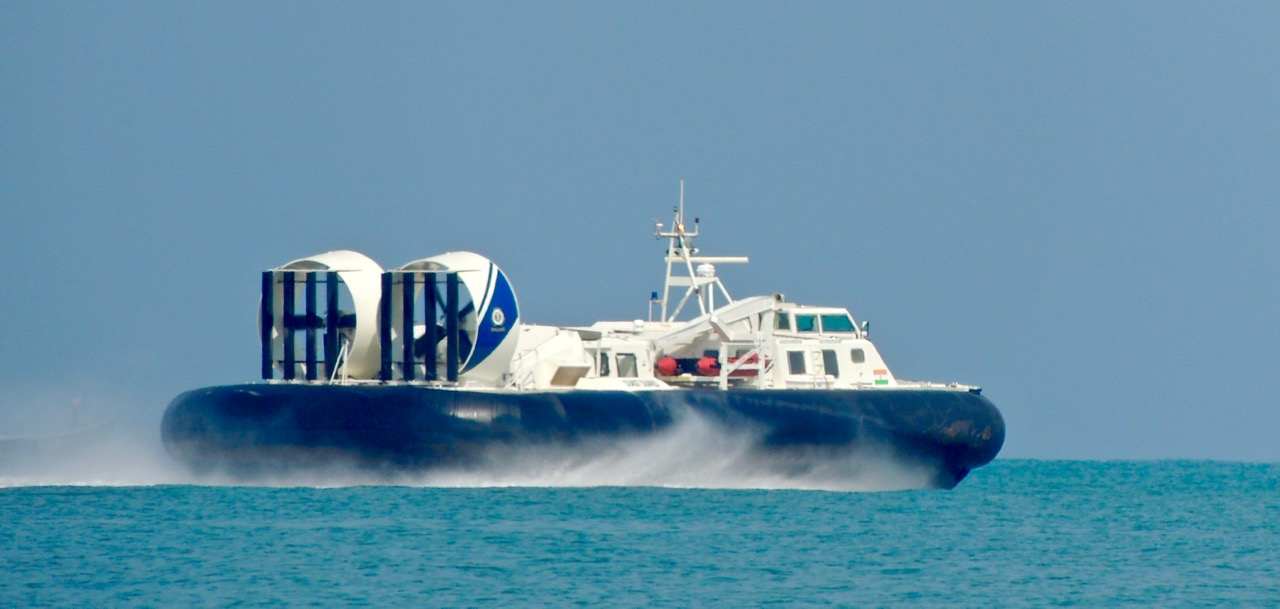
- An Indian Coast Guard Griffon 8000TD hovercraft

Class overview
- Name: Griffon Hoverwork 8000TD
- Builders: Griffon Hoverwork

General characteristics
- Type: hovercraft
- Tonnage: 8,000kg
- Length: 22.52 m (73 ft 11 in)
- Beam: 11 m (36 ft 1 in)
- Propulsion: 2 MTU 12V183 TB32 diesel engines for lift and propulsion, driving 2 variable-pitch propellers
- Speed: 53.5 knots (99.1 km/h; 61.6 mph)
- Capacity: 42-56 passengers

Griffon/GRSE 8000 TD class is a series of hovercraft designed by Griffon Hovercraft Ltd, Southampton, England. It has proven to be one of Griffon's most commercially successful hovercraft.

The 8000TD's most extensive customer has been the Indian Coast Guard, for which the order was jointly built by the Griffon Hoverwork and the Indian firm Garden Reach Shipbuilders & Engineers. It has primarily been operated by military customers, including the Korea Coast Guard and the Saudi Arabian Border Guards.

== Design ==
The Griffon Hoverwork 8000TD is a twin-engine fully-amphibious hovercraft. In Indian service, it has been typically operated by a complement of 11 personnel, which includes a pair of officers. Each craft has sufficient capacity to support payloads of up to 8,000 kilograms (18,000 lb), making it suitable to carry a mixture of passengers, vehicles and miscellaneous equipment for conducting disaster relief and medical evacuation missions. In a typical all-passenger configuration, between 42 and 56 personnel can be carried.

Power is provided by a pair of 588 kilowatts (789 hp) radiator-cooled Iveco diesel engines, supplied by the German engine manufacturer MTU, which drive the craft's 2.6 metres (8 ft 6 in) variable-pitch propellers. To minimise maintenance requirements and increase durability, many of the craft features a touchscreen-based condition monitoring system that warns the crew of excessive vibration and other unfavourable conditions in and around the drivetrain in real-time. This propulsion system reportedly enables the craft to achieve a top speed of 53.5 knots (99.1 km/h; 61.6 mph), making it suitable for high-speed patrolling while traversing coastal shallow waters, marshy areas, and creeks as well as across deep seas.

The hull of the 8000TD is primarily composed of lightweight marine grade aluminium alloy, while other elements comprise a high proportion of composite materials, which are typically moulded for greater strength and longevity. According to Griffon Hoverwork, each craft has an anticipated typical lifespan of 20 years with proper and regular servicing. It is fitted with a 1.25 metres (4 ft 1 in) skirt which has been designed to deliver consistent and safe performance over various terrain and weather conditions. Later-built craft features improved seakeeping capabilities and a higher top speed, along with greater clearance, and more advanced onboard navigation and surveillance systems. For military operators, the craft has also typically been fitted with a single 12.7 millimetres (0.50 in) machine gun, which can be equipped to be remotely operated. Some operators have opted to fit their 8000TDs with bow ramps, enabling road vehicles to be readily embarked and disembarked as required.

== Operational history ==
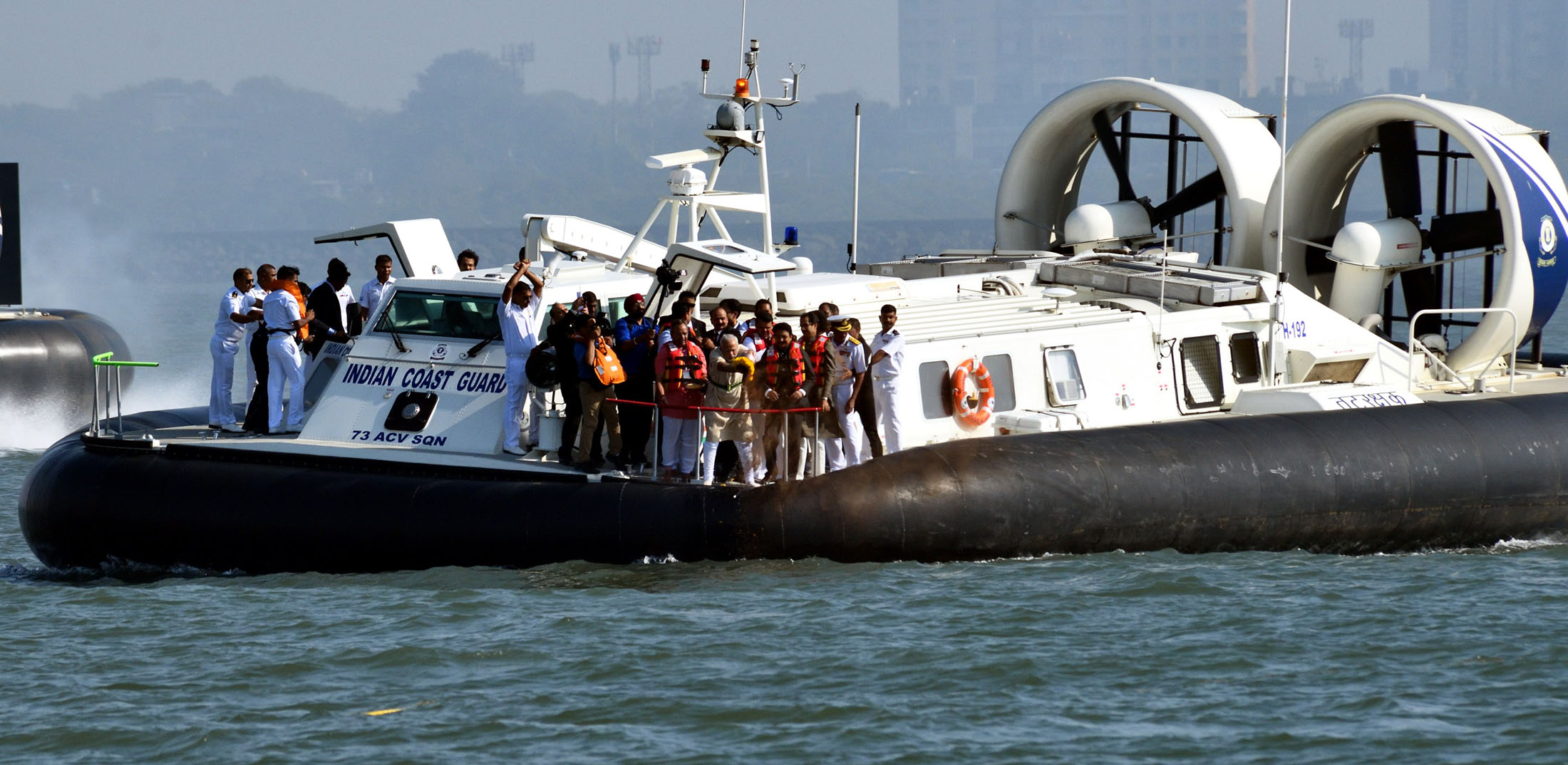
The Prime Minister, Narendra Modi performing Jal Pujan for the Chhatrapati Shivaji Maharaj Memorial in the Arabian Sea, 4 km off Mumbai's Marine Drive, in Mumbai on 24 December 2016 from an hovercraft of the Indian Coast Guard

During 2001, it was announced that the Indian Coast Guard had formed an agreement with Griffon Hoverwork to supply an initial batch of six 8000TD hovercraft, two of which were to be manufactured at GHL's boatyard in Southampton, England, while the remaining four craft were assembled from complete knocked-down kits (CKDs) supplied to the Indian company Garden Reach Shipbuilders & Engineers (GRSE), based in Kolkata, India.

In October 2010, Griffon Hoverwork was awarded a follow-on contract valued at £34 million to supply the Indian Coast Guard with a further 12 8000TD hovercraft. At the time, this deal was the largest to ever be made by the company. These craft are not identical to the earlier batch, featuring several enhancements and additional pieces of equipment, often intended to improve serviceability and incorporate technical advances. This order was fulfilled almost half a year ahead of schedule, the final craft being delivered at a ceremony held in Mumbai on 5 September 2014. The Indian Coast Guard has deployed its 8000TDs in various roles, including search and rescue operations, to assist vessels in various forms of distress, as well as the surveillance and interception of offending vessels under both day and night conditions.

Additional operators for the 8000TD series have included three examples supplied to the Korea Coast Guard, five craft for the Saudi Arabian Border Guards, and a single example bought for use at Singapore's Changi Airport.

=== Replacement ===
The type is being replaced by India's indigenous Air Cushion Vehicles from 18 June 2026 onwards. The type is being constructed by the Chowgule & Company Private Limited in Goa, India. The contract for six units of the design was signed on 24 October 2026 for ₹387.44 crore (equivalent to ₹413 crore or US$43 million in 2026). The girder laying and commencement of erection ceremony for the first vessel, C-326, was conducted on 30 July 2025. The same for the last three vessels was conducted on 11 May 2026.

C-326 was commissioned on 18 June 2026. Thereafter, H-186 was retired from service with full military honours on 29 June 2026 at its home port, Haldia, West Bengal.

The rest will be replaced by the Heavy Duty Air Cushion Vehicles, 12 units of which has been cleared by the Defence Acquisition Council (DAC) on 27 March 2026.

== Ships of the class ==
=== Indian Coast Guard service ===
Pennant Number	Date of commission	Date of decommission	Homeport	Remark
Indian Coast Guard
Flight I
H 181	18 September 2000		Haldia	Made by Griffon
H 182	21 September 2001		Paradip	Made by Griffon
H 183	21 September 2001		Mandapam	
H 184			Okha	Delivered in October 2001
H 185			Okha	Delivered in November 2001
H 186	21 March 2002	29 June 2026	Haldia	
Flight II
H 187	11 June 2012		Okha	
H 188	12 December 2012		Haldia	
H 189	20 November 2012		Okha	
H 190	19 February 2013		Mandapam	
H 191	10 Apr 2013		Okha	
H 192	23 December 2013		Mumbai	
H 193	13 February 2014		Haldia	
H 194	23 December 2013		Mumbai	
H 195	13 May 2014		Mandapam	
H 196	10 November 2014		Manglore	
H 197	11 October 2014		Mandapam	
H 198	10 November 2014		Mangalore	

== Specifications ==
- Crew: 15
- Empty weight: 30,000 kg
- Payload: 8,000 kg
- Length: 22.52 m
- Height: 5.52 m
- Beam: 11 m
- Maximum speed: 50 knots or 92 km/h
- Armament: 1 x 12.7 mm machine gun
- Power: 2 × MTU 12V183 TB32 diesel engines
- Propulsion: 2 × ducted CP aircrew propellers, 1,600 bhp
- Range: 365/42
- Fuel capacity: 2,000 litres

== See also ==
- Jija Bai class patrol vessel
- Priyadarshini class patrol vessel
- Sarojini Naidu class Extra-fast patrol vessel
- Tara Bai class patrol vessel
