= Timblo-class interceptor craft =

Indian coast guard fast interceptor craft

Class overview
- Name: Timblo
- Builders: Timblo Drydocks Pvt. Ltd, Goa
- Operators: Indian Coast Guard
- Built: 2010–2011
- In service: 2010–present
- Completed: 10

General characteristics
- Type: Interceptor craft
- Displacement: 7 long tons (7 t)
- Length: 9.8 m (32 ft)
- Beam: 3.1 m (10 ft)
- Draught: 0.6 m (2.0 ft)
- Propulsion: Twin mercury on-board motors of 250 hp each
- Speed: 37 knots (69 km/h; 43 mph)
- Range: 600 litres of fuel
- Armament: Mounting for light machine gun

The Timblo class interceptor craft is a class of ten vessels built by Timblo Drydocks Pvt. Ltd, Goa for the Indian Coast Guard.

== Description ==
The rigid hull watercraft in this class are 9.8 meters long with a displacement of 7 tonnes. The beam of each craft is 3.1 m and the draught is 0.6 m. The hull of crafts is made of fibre reinforced plastic. These boats are powered by twin mercury on-board motors of 250 hp each. This gives a speed of 37 knots which is comfortably in excess of the contractual requirement of 32 knots. The crafts have a partially enclosed cabin with ballistic protection of MIJ111 standards. The fuel carry capacity of the craft is 600 litres. There is also a gunmount for a light machine gun. The vessels are equipped with VHF communication, search and rescue transponder and GPS, along with other navigation and communication equipment.

== Vessels in the class ==
Pennant number	Date built	IR number
IC 117	16 November 2010	37651
IC 118	23 December 2010	38136
IC 119	24 January 2011	38459
IC 120	15 March 2011	38954
IC 121	15 March 2011	38966
IC 122	8 April 2011	39116
IC 123	8 April 2011	39128
IC 124	27 May 2011	41884
IC 125	27 May 2011	41896
IC 126	1 August 2011	39647

== See also ==
- Timblo class patrol craft
- Mandovi Marine (12.5-Meter) Class Patrol Craft
- Swallow Craft Class Inshore Patrol Vessel
- AMPL Class
