= Vadyar-class interceptor craft =

Indian patrol boat

The Vadyar-class interceptor crafts are a series of eight rigid collar high speed boats designed and supplied to the Indian Coast Guard in 1988 certified by the Indian Register of Shipping for patrolling off the Rameswaram coast in Southern India.

The hulls of each boat in the series have a length of 6.2 to 7.0 m with a beam of 2.1 m and draft of 0.45 m. With provision for light weaponry and a bulletproof screen for the coxswain, the all-up weight of craft is 2.4 tonnes and were initially powered by Simpson P6 354 120 BHP Diesel Engines after successful marinisation and thereafter fitted with two 40 HP on-board motors and has a range of 120 nautical miles.

The collar of each boat is constructed from closed-cell polyethylene foam contained in a heavy duty armoured polyvinyl covering. This makes puncturing a remote possibility. Even when the outer skin is damaged, the boat is still fully usable as the outer skin can be easily repaired by applying glued patches.
