= AMPL-class interceptor boat =

Class overview
- Name: AMPL (P-2000) class interceptor boats
- Builders: M/s Anderson Marine Private Limited
- Operators: Indian Coast Guard
- Succeeded by: Bharati-class interceptor boat
- In commission: 1993–2003
- Planned: 10 (with an option for additional 6)
- Building: 0
- Completed: 10
- Active: 5 + 1 (leased to Mauritius)

General characteristics
- Type: Interceptor boat
- Displacement: 49 tonnes (48 long tons; 54 short tons)
- Length: 20.8 m (68 ft 3 in)
- Beam: 5.8 m (19 ft 0 in)
- Draught: 1 m (3 ft 3 in)
- Propulsion: 2 Deutz-MWM TBD 234 V12 diesel engine (823 Bhp each) 1 Deutz-MWM TBD 234 V8 550-bhp loiter diesel center-line engine
- Speed: 15 knots (28 km/h; 17 mph)
- Range: 600 nmi (1,100 km)
- Complement: 1 officer and 11 enlisted

AMPL (P-2000) class of interceptor boats are series of ten watercraft built by M/s Anderson Marine Private Limited, Goa, India for the Indian Coast Guard.

== Design ==
The vessels in this series are 20 meters (65 ft 7 in) long with a beam of 5.8 meters (19 ft 0 in) and are armed with single 7.62 mm machine gun.

They are powered by two Deutz-MWM TBD 234 V12 diesel engines (823 bhp, 614 kW each) and one Deutz-MWM TBD 234 V8 550 bhp (410 kW) diesel engine driving three Hamilton 402-series water-jet, 2,200 bhp (1,600 kW). Initially 10 vessels were ordered in September 1990 with an option for 6 more, however the option was never invoked. They were built in cooperation with Sea King industries. Glass-reinforced plastic hulls were laid up by Anderson Marine, employing molds originally built by M/s Watercraft Marine, Shoreham, UK for the Royal Navy Archer class (P-2000).

In order to meet the speed and performance requirements, vessels were configured in a triple-engine water jet arrangement and the machinery, superstructure and deck arrangement were redesigned by Amgram Ltd, Sussex, UK. The vessels were originally to have had a 20 mm Oerlikon AA forward but a remotely controlled 7.62 mm machine gun has been substituted.

== Role ==
The vessels are intended for patrolling the coast, interdiction of smugglers and infiltrators, and search and rescue operations. The AMPL class interceptors have a complement of 1 officer and 11 sailors. They have a range 600 nmi (1,100 km) at 15 knots (28 km/h; 17 mph). The vessels have been based at various Indian coast guard station such as Mandapam, Mangalore, Visakhapatnam, Okha, Chennai, Kochi and Goa, and one boat was leased to Mauritius in 2001.

External image
- AMPL Class Interceptor Boat
- image icon

== Ships of the class ==
| IMO no. | Name | Pennant no. | Date of commission | Date of Decommission | Homeport |
|---|---|---|---|---|---|
| 9050838 | ICGS | C 131 | 16 November 1993 | 23 October 2013 | Kandla |
| 9050840 | ICGS | C 132 | 16 November 1993 | 23 October 2013 | Kandla |
| 9050852 | ICGS | C 133 | 20 May 1995 | 26 March 2014 | Goa |
| 9050864 | ICGS | C 134 | 20 May 1995 | 29 February 2016 | Mandapam |
| 9050876 | ICGS | C 135 | 25 May 1995 | | Okha |
| 9050888 | ICGS | C 136 | 25 March 1995 | | Okha |
| 9050890 | ICGS | C 137 | 4 September 1996 | | Mandapam |
| 9050917 | ICGS | C 138 | 4 September 1996 | | Mandapam |
| 9050929 | ICGS | C 139 | 16 October 1997 | Leased to Mauritius in 2001 | |
| 9050905 | ICGS | C 140 | 15 November 2003 | 04-July-2019 | Port Blair |

== See also ==
- Swallow Craft class
- Griffon/Grse class
- Mandovi Marine class
- Timblo class
