= Sarojini Naidu-class patrol vessel =

Indian Fast patrol vessel class

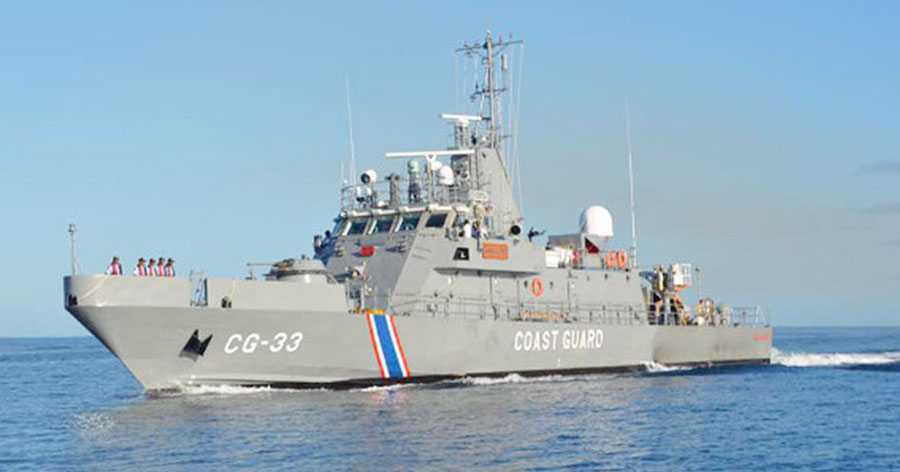
- MCGS Valiant

Class overview
- Name: Sarojini Naidu class fast patrol vessel
- Builders: Goa Shipyard Ltd., Panaji, India
- Operators: Indian Coast Guard; National Coast Guard of Mauritius
- Preceded by: Tara Bai-class patrol vessel
- Succeeded by: Rani Abbakka-class
- Built: 2002–2006
- In commission: 2002–present
- Planned: 9
- Completed: 9
- Active: 3
- Retired: 6

General characteristics
- Type: Inshore patrol vessel
- Displacement: 259 tonnes
- Length: 48 m (157 ft 6 in)
- Beam: 7.5 m (24 ft 7 in)
- Draught: 2 m (6 ft 7 in)
- Propulsion: 3 × MTU 4000 diesel engines, each 2,720 kW (3,648 hp) at 2100 rpm
- Speed: 35 knots (65 km/h; 40 mph)
- Range: 1,500 nmi (2,800 km; 1,700 mi) at 12 kn (22 km/h; 14 mph)
- Complement: 6 Officers and 36 Sailors
- Armament: 1 x 30mm CRN 91 Naval Gun OR; 1 x 30mm 2A42; 2 x 12.7mm HMG

Sarojini Naidu Class Fast Patrol Vessels are series of seven Mid Shore Patrol Vessels built by Goa Shipyard Limited at Vasco da Gama, Goa for the Indian Coast Guard produced between 2002 and 2006.

== Introduction ==
The Sarojini class of watercraft are seagoing, high speed, armed surveillance platform, capable of shallow water operations.

These vessels are primarily designed for anti-smuggling operations, anti-terrorist deployment, fisheries protection and search and rescue operations. These vessels can also support the navy during wartime, as a coastal convoy escort and a communication link.

== Design ==
Powered by three 2,720 kW MTU diesel engines, driving independent Kamewa water-jets, these vessels are designed for good maneuverability and are capable of operating in up to Sea State 4 and can withstand Sea State 6. The vessels have a top speed of 35 knots and have an operational range of 1,500 nm. They are equipped with a 30 mm CRN 91 Naval Gun at forward with two 7.62 mm or 12.7 mm machine guns, each installed on both sides of the board.

They are fitted with the latest satellite communication and navigation systems including differential global positioning system (DGPS), electronic chart display and information system (ECDIS) and global maritime distress and safety system (GMDSS). They have air-conditioned accommodation for a crew of 35 and have endurance of 7 days. The vessels in this series are eco-friendly, featuring an on-board sewage treatment plant and the gases used for air-conditioning are ozone layer friendly.

== Ships of the class ==
Name (Namesake)	Pennant Number	Launched	Commissioned	Decommissioned	Homeport
Indian Coast Guard
Sarojini Naidu	229	2002	11 November 2002	25 November 2022	Paradip
Durgabai Deshmukh	230	2002	29 April 2003	27 April 2023	Port Blair
Kasturba Gandhi	231	6 July 2005	28 October 2005		Mangalore
Aruna Asaf Ali	232	20 October 2005	28 January 2006	18 July 2026	Port Blair
Subhadra Kumari Chauhan	233	30 December 2005	28 April 2006	27 August 2026	Mumbai
Meera Behn	234	28 January 2006	25 July 2006	21 August 2026	Okha
Savitribai Phule	235	28 April 2006	28 October 2006	19 August 2026	Mangalore
National Coast Guard of Mauritius
Victory	32	29 February 2016	10 December 2016		
Valiant	33	2 February 2017	16 August 2017		

== Gallery ==
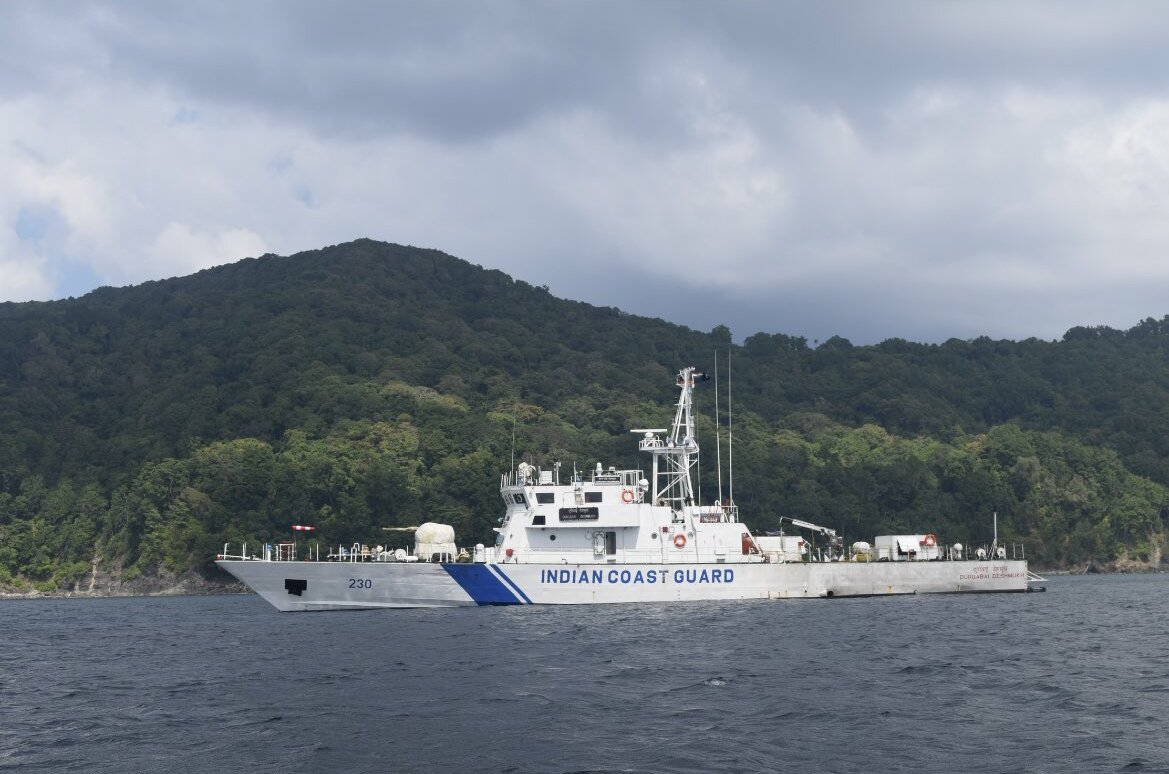
Durgabai Deshmukh (230) patrolling the water.

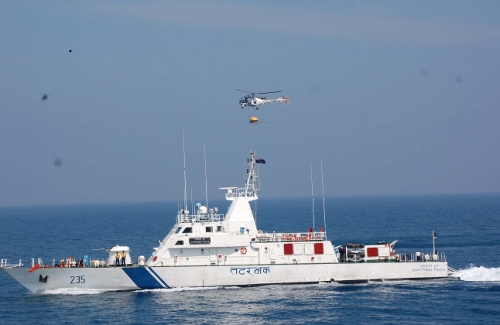
Indian Coast Guard helicopter using an oil spill disperse with ICGS Savitribai Phule.

== See also ==
- Rajshree class
- Rani Abbaka class
- Priyadarshini Class
- Tarabai Class
- Rajhans Class
- Jijabai Class
