= Jija Bai-class patrol vessel =

Class overview
- Name: Jija Bai class
- Builders: Sumidagawa Shipyard Co., Tokyo; Garden Reach Shipbuilders & Engineers, Kolkata
- Operators: Indian Coast Guard
- Preceded by: Rajhans-class patrol vessel
- Succeeded by: Priyadarshini-class patrol vessel
- In commission: 1984–2011
- Completed: 7
- Retired: 7

General characteristics
- Type: Patrol vessel
- Displacement: 181 tonnes (178 long tons; 200 short tons)
- Length: 44.02 m (144 ft 5 in)
- Beam: 7.4 m (24 ft 3 in)
- Draught: 1.5 m (4 ft 11 in)
- Installed power: 3 × 80 kW, 315V, 50 Hz diesel generators
- Propulsion: 2 × MTU 12V538 TB82 diesel engines, 5,940 bhp (4,429 kW), 2 shafts
- Speed: 25 knots (46 km/h; 29 mph)
- Range: 2,375 nmi (4,398 km; 2,733 mi) at 14 kn (26 km/h; 16 mph)
- Complement: 7 officers, 27 enlisted
- Sensors & processing systems: BEL make-1* Decca 1226 navigation radar
- Armament: 1 × Bofors 40 mm AA gun; 2 × 7.62 mm (0.3 in) machine guns

The Jija Bai class were seven mid-shore patrol vessels of the Indian Coast Guard, designed by Sumidagawa Shipyard Co. Ltd., Tokyo, and jointly built by Sumidagawa and Garden Reach Shipbuilders & Engineers, Kolkata between 1983 and 1985.

== Design ==
The 44-metre (144 ft 4 in) long vessels, with a displacement of 181 tonnes, had a top speed of 25 knots (46 km/h; 29 mph). The vessels were powered by two MTU 12V538 diesel engines driving two independent four-bladed propellers. The class had a range of 2,375 nautical miles (4,398 km; 2,733 mi) at a cruise speed of 14 knots (26 km/h; 16 mph). The crew of the patrol vessel consisted of 7 officers and 27 enlisted sailors. The vessels were armed with a 40 mm 60 cal Bofors Mk 3 AA. A plan to build eight more boats of the same class was cancelled in favour of Tara Bai class.

External images
- Jija Bai class patrol vessel
- image icon
- image icon

== Ships of the class ==
Name	Pennant Number	Commissioned	Decommissioned	Homeport
ICGS Jija Bai	64	22 February 1984	27 June 2011	Chennai
ICGS Chand Bibi	65	22 February 1984	19 January 2012	Vishakapatanam
ICGS Kittur Chinnama	66	21 May 1983	27 June 2011	Chennai
ICGS Rani Jindan	67	21 October 1983	6 February 2012	Chennai
ICGS Habbah Khatun	68	27 April 1985	6 February 2012	Chennai
ICGS Rama Devi	69	3 August 1985	19 January 2012	Vishakapatanam
ICGS Avvaiyar	70	19 October 1985	6 February 2012	Chennai

== See also ==
- Rajshree-class patrol vessel
- Rani Abbakka-class patrol vessel
- Sarojini Naidu-class patrol vessel
- Priyadarshini-class patrol vessel
- Tara Bai-class patrol vessel
- Rajhans-class patrol vessel
