= Tara Bai-class patrol vessel =

Indian class of Patrol vessels

Tara Bai class
Class overview
- Builders: Singapore Slipway & Engineering; Garden Reach Shipbuilders & Engineers
- Operators: Indian Coast Guard
- Preceded by: Priyadarshini-class patrol vessel
- Succeeded by: Sarojini Naidu-class patrol vessel
- Built: 1987–1990
- Completed: 6
- Active: 0
- Retired: 6

General characteristics
- Type: Coastal patrol vessel
- Displacement: 236 tonnes
- Length: 44.9 m (147 ft)
- Beam: 7.0 m (23.0 ft)
- Draught: 1.89 m (6 ft 2 in)
- Installed power: 2 × MTU 12V538 TB82 diesels
- Propulsion: 2 × 4-blade propellers, 5,940 bhp (4,430 kW)
- Range: 2,400 nmi (4,400 km; 2,800 mi) at 12 kn (22 km/h; 14 mph)
- Endurance: 7 days
- Complement: 5 officers, 29 enlisted
- Sensors & processing systems: BEL make-1; Decca 1226 navigation radar
- Armament: 40 mm 60 cal Bofors Mk 3 AA; 2 × single 7.62 mm MG

The Tara Bai class of coastal patrol vessels is a series of six watercraft built by Singapore Slipway & Engineering and Garden Reach Shipbuilders & Engineers, Kolkata for Indian Coast Guard. They are intended for search and rescue, fisheries patrol and sovereignty patrol.

== Design ==
The vessels in this class are 45 metres (148 ft) long with a beam of 7 metres (23 ft) and are armed with a 40 mm 60 cal Bofors Mk 3 AA. The hull design of Tara Bai class is based on standard Lürssen 45-m hull steel construction. They are powered by two MTU 12V538 TB82 diesel engines and have two propellers with four blades. The vessels have various communication and navigation equipment including HF/DF and echo sounder and an autopilot.

== Capacity ==
The vessels carries 30 tonnes of fuel and has a range 2,400 nautical miles (4,400 km; 2,800 mi) at a cruising speed of 12 knots (22 km/h; 14 mph). They carry ten tonnes of fresh water with a three ton/day distiller and have an endurance of 7 days. They have a five-ton bollard towing hook and a rigid inflatable boat. They have air-conditioned accommodation for a crew of 5 officers and 29 enlisted sailors.

== Ships of the class ==
Tara Bai-class coastal patrol vessels
Name	Pennant Number	Date of Commission	Date of Decommission	Homeport
ICGS Tara Bai	71	26 June 1987	18 July 2013	Porbandar
ICGS Ahalya Bai	72	9 September 1987	21 December 2013	Tuticorin
ICGS Lakshmi Bai	73	20 March 1989		Kochi
ICGS Akka Devi	74	9 August 1990	20 March 2014	Andaman & Nicobar Islands
ICGS Naiki Devi	75	19 March 1990	20 March 2014	Tuticorin
ICGS Ganga Devi	76	19 November 1990		Andaman & Nicobar Islands

== See also ==
- Rajshree class
- Rani Abbaka class
- Sarojini Naidu class
- Priyadarshini class
- Rajhans class
- Jija Bai class
