= Priyadarshini-class patrol vessel =

Patrol Vessel class of the Indian Coast Guard

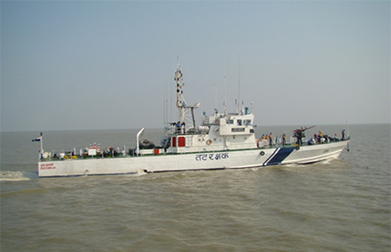

Class overview
- Name: Priyadarshini class fast patrol vessel
- Builders: Goa Shipyard Ltd., GRSE
- Operators: Indian Coast Guard
- Preceded by: Jija Bai-class patrol vessel
- Succeeded by: Tara Bai-class patrol vessel
- Built: 2002–2006
- In commission: 1982-2018
- Planned: 8
- Completed: 8
- Active: 0
- Retired: 8

Priyadarshini-class patrol vessels (also referred to as Jija Bai Mod 1 class) are a series of 8 mid-shore fast patrol boats, built by Garden Reach Shipbuilders & Engineers, Kolkata and Goa Shipyard Limited, Vasco da Gama, Goa for Indian Coast Guard between 1991 and 1998.

== Design ==
The 46 metre-long vessels with a displacement of 215 tonnes have a top speed of 24 knots. The vessels are powered by two MTU 12V538 diesel engines driving two independent four-blade propellers. The Priyadarshini class has a range of 2400 nm at cruise speed of 12 knots. The crew of the patrol vessels consists of 5 officers and 29 enlisted sailors. The vessels are armed with a 40 mm 60 cal Bofors Mk 3 AA. In early 1998, ICGS Amrit Kaur (225) acted as a trial platform for the 30 mm CRN 91 Naval Gun.

Last ship Rajiya Sulatana was decommissioned on 1 June 2021.

== Ships of the class ==
Name	Pennant	Builder	Commissioned	Decommissioned	Homeport	Status
ICGS Priyadarshini	221	GRSE	25 May 1992	29 August 2014	Visakhapatnam	Decommissioned
ICGS Razia Sultana	222	GRSE	18 November 1992	1 June 2021	Paradip	Decommissioned
ICGS Annie Beseant	223	GSL	7 December 1991	10 January 2014	Manglore	Decommissioned
ICGS Kamla Devi	224	GSL	20 May 1992		Goa	Decommissioned
ICGS Amrit Kaur	225	GSL	20 March 1993	20 March 2015	Mumbai	Decommissioned
ICGS Kanak Lata Barua	226	GRSE	27 March 1997	23 June 2017	Port Blair	Decommissioned
ICGS Bhikaji Cama	227	GRSE	24 September 1997	28 March 2018	Port Blair	Decommissioned
ICGS Sucheta Kripalani	228	GRSE	16 March 1998	23 March 2018	Kolkata	Decommissioned

== Specification ==
- Displacement: 215 tonnes
- Length: 46 meter
- Beam: 7.5 meter
- Draught: 1.85 meter
- Speed: 24 Knots
- Armament: 40 mm 60 cal Bofors Mk 3 AA or 1x30 CRN 91; 2x7.62 mm MG
- Radar: BEL make-1*Decca 1245/6X or Decca 1226 for navigation
- Power: 2 MTU 12V538 TB82 diesel
- Propulsion: 2*4 Blade propeller, 5940 bhp
- Electric: 240 kW (3*80 kW, 315 V,50 Hz Diesel driven)
- Range: 2400 nm at 12 knots
- Crew: 5 officers. 29 enlisted.
- Fuel: 20 Tonnes

== See also ==
- Jija Bai class patrol vessel
