= National Hydrographic Office =

Indian government agency

- Logo of National Hydrographic Office, headquarters of Indian Naval Hydrographic Department stationed at Dehradun.

Military overview
- Formed: 1 June 1954; 72 years ago
- Preceding agencies: Marine Survey of India (1947-1954); Naval Hydrographic Office (1954-1997)
- Headquarters: National Hydrographic Office, 107-A, Rajpur Road, Dehradun, India; 30.3447888°N 78.0580398°E
- Minister responsible: Rajnath Singh, Defence Ministry
- Deputy Minister responsible: Shripad Yesso Naik, Defence Ministry
- Military executive: Vice Admiral Lochan Singh Pathania, Chief Hydrographer to Government of India
- Parent department: Indian Navy
- Website: NHO Official

The National Hydrographic Office, formerly the Indian Naval Hydrographic Department (INHD), headed by the Chief Hydrographer to the Government of India, is an Indian government agency responsible for hydrographic surveys and nautical charting in India. Its headquarters National Hydrographic Office is located in Dehradun, Uttarakhand beside the Principal Controller of Defense Accounts Office (Air Force). Presently, the department is equipped with seven indigenously built survey ships including a catamaran hull survey vessel (CHSV). The National Institute of Hydrography is the training institute to impart knowledge regarding hydrography and to train its personnel. Two more ships are currently being constructed and expected to be commissioned by 2025-26.

The department is also responsible for making electronic navigational charts officially on behalf of the Government of India. The department has also signed memoranda of understanding with various countries for surveying their waters as part of international cooperation.

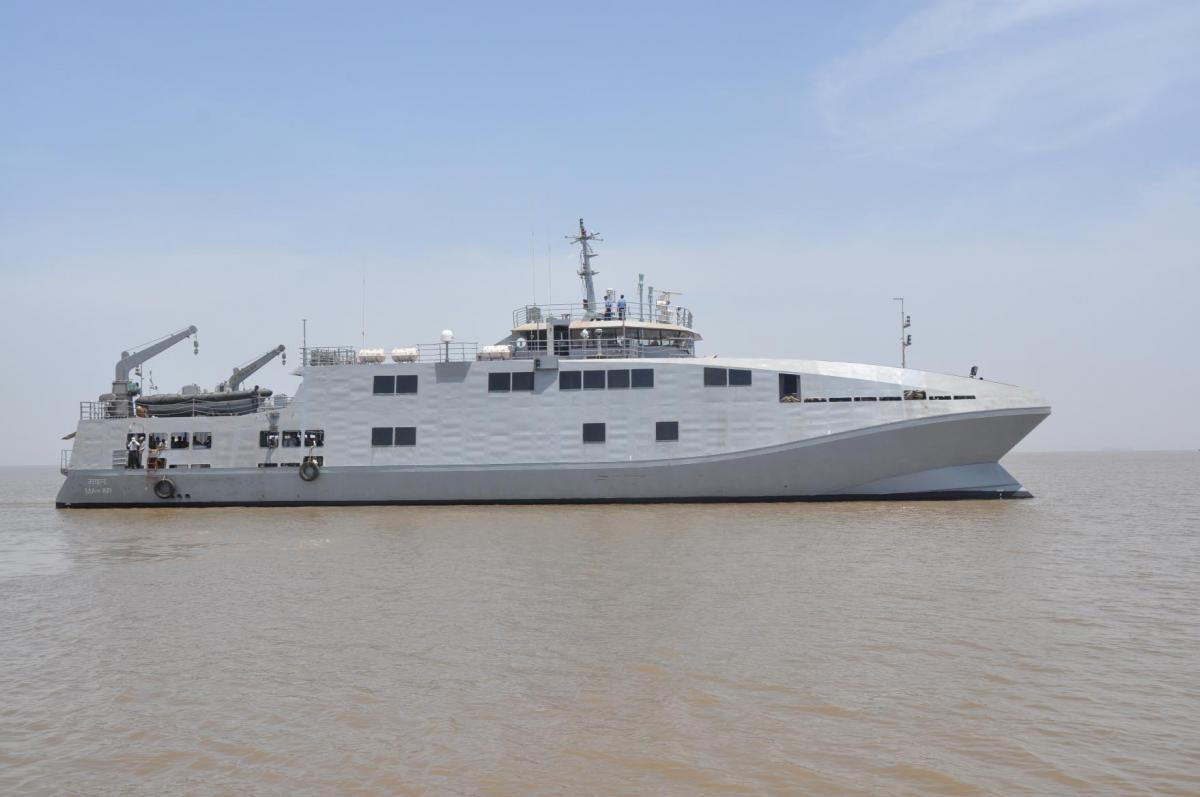
INS Makar used by INHD for surveys

== History ==
=== Pre-independence ===
Hydrography in India originated back in the 17th century. The first chart of the Indian Ocean was compiled by Thorntons of the British East India Company in 1703, which is considered as a major step towards the development of nautical charts of India. In 1874, the Indian Marine Survey Department was established in Calcutta; later it became a part of Royal Indian Navy.

=== Post-independence ===
After Indian independence in 1947, the department continued its functions under the Surveyor-in-Charge of the Marine Survey of India from Bombay. Later the office was shifted to Dehradun by renaming it as Naval Hydrographic Office headed by Chief Hydrographer of the Navy, which was later re-designated Chief Hydrographer to the Government of India in 1964. In view of international role of India in hydrography, the office was renamed once again in 1997 as National Hydrographic Office. Captain (later Admiral and Chief of the Naval Staff) Jal Cursetji was the first Indian to serve as the Chief Hydrographer of the Navy.

== National Hydrographic Office ==
The National Hydrographic Office, headquartered at Dehradun, is responsible for the publication of nautical charts relating to India on behalf of the Government of India. It is the National Authority for publication of nautical charts and publications.

=== Chief Hydrographer to the Government of India ===
The Chief Hydrographer to the Government of India is the executive head of the Indian Naval Hydrographic Department. The Chief Hydrographer is a vice admiral from the Indian Navy. The Chief Hydrographer is also the coordinator for charting Area "J" in the North Indian Ocean and NAVAREA VIII coordinator.

== Organisational structure ==
The department is headed by Chief Hydrographer, assisted by a staff officer. The organisation is further divided into 6 divisions.

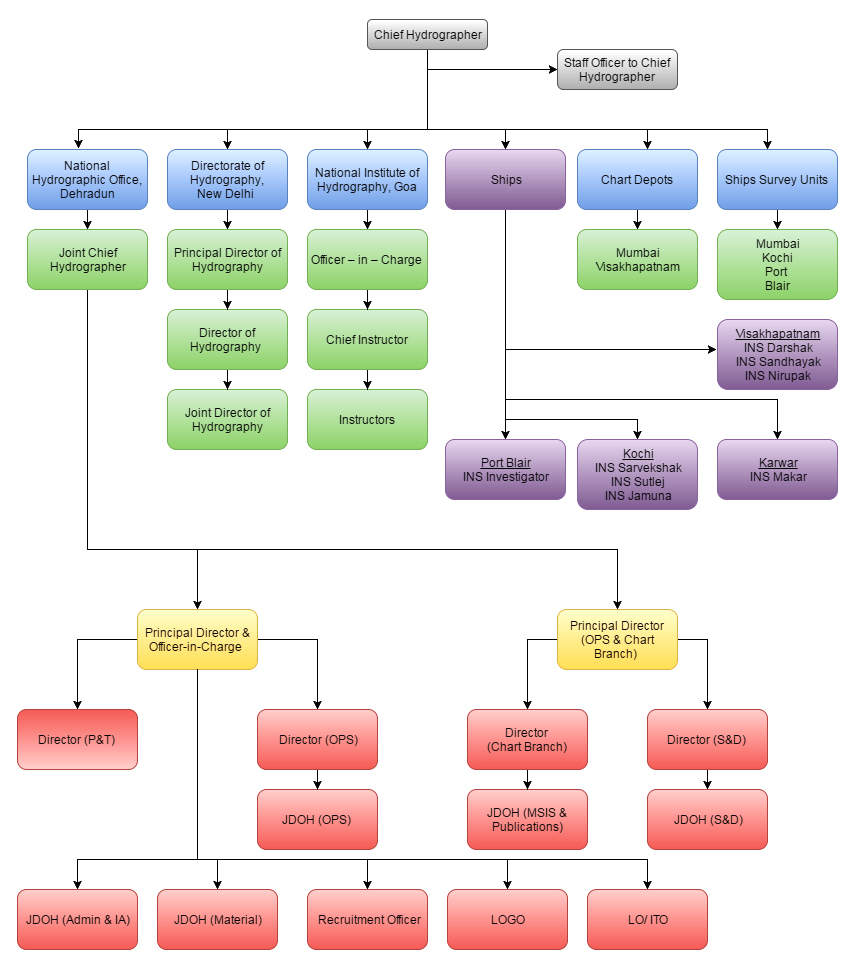

== Ships ==
Presently 7 ocean-going survey ships are in service with the department. All these ships belong to Sandhayak class, whose design was adopted as basic one, and later added on with minor changes in tandem with the existing technology, except INS Makar which belongs to the Makar class.

Ships in Sandhayak class
Name	Pennant No.	Date of Commission	Home Port	Crest\ Emblem\ Image
INS Nirupak	J 20	14 August 1985	Visakhapatnam	
INS Investigator	J 15	11 January 1990	Mumbai	
INS Jamuna	J 16	31 August 1991	Kochi	INS Jamuna in the foreground
INS Sutlej	J 17	19 February 1993	Kochi	
INS Sandhayak	J 18	14 March 1981 (Decommissioned on 04 June 2021)	Visakhapatnam	
INS Darshak	J 21	28 April 2001	Visakhapatnam	
INS Sarvekshak	J 22	14 January 2002	Kochi	INS Sarvekshak in the background

Ships in Makar class
Name	Pennant No.	Date of Commission	Homeport	Crest\ Emblem\ Image
INS Makar	J 31	21 Sep 2012	Karwar	
