= List of ship launches in 1925 =

The list of ship launches in 1925 is a chronological list of ships launched in 1925.

	Ship	Class	Builder	Location	Country	Notes
6 January	Emden	Light cruiser	Reichsmarinewerft	Wilhelmshaven	Germany	For Reichsmarine
8 January	Hebburn	Cargo ship	Blyth Shipbuilding & Dry Docks Co. Ltd	Blyth	United Kingdom	For Huddart Parker Ltd.
12 January	Topeka	Cargo ship	Deutsche Werke	Kiel	Germany	For A/S Norge-Mexico Gulflinjen.
15 January	Alynbank	Cargo ship	Harland & Wolff	Belfast	United Kingdom	For Bank Line.
23 January	Príncipe Alfonso	Almirante Cervera-class light cruiser	Sociedad Española de Construcción Naval	Ferrol	Spain	For Spanish Navy.
10 February	Thisbe	Cargo ship	Blyth Shipbuilding & Dry Docks Co. Ltd	Blyth	United Kingdom	For Sociètè Navale Caennaise.
12 February	Elmbank	Cargo ship	Harland & Wolff	Belfast	United Kingdom	For Bank Line.
23 February	Ro-68	Type L4 submarine	Mitsubishi	Kobe	Japan	For Imperial Japanese Navy
24 February	Inanda	Cargo liner	Swan, Hunter & Wigham Richardson Ltd	Newcastle upon Tyne	United Kingdom	For Charente Steamship Co Ltd
25 February	Inverlago	Tanker	Harland & Wolff	Belfast	United Kingdom	For Lago Shipping Co.
13 March	Patrick Stewart	Cable ship	William Simons and Co. Ltd.	Renfrew	United Kingdom	renamed HMIS Investigator and converted into a survey ship for the Royal Indian Navy
14 March	Schwarzenfels	Merchant ship	Deutsche Werke	Kiel	Germany	renamed Schwabenland and converted to a seaplane tender for Deutsche Luft Hansa's South Atlantic airmail in 1934
25 March	Inverossa	Tanker	Harland & Wolff	Belfast	United Kingdom	For Lago Shipping Co.
26 March	Rawalpindi	Passenger ship	Harland & Wolff	Govan	United Kingdom	For Peninsular and Oriental Steam Navigation Company.
4 April	B-5	B-class submarine	SECN	Cartagena	Spain	For Spanish Navy.
6 April	Inverpool	Tanker	Harland & Wolff	Belfast	United Kingdom	For British Mexican Petroleum Company.
7 April	Saratoga	Lexington-class aircraft carrier	New York Shipbuilding	Camden, New Jersey	United States	For United States Navy
8 April	Forresbank	Cargo ship	Harland & Wolff	Belfast	United Kingdom	For Bank Line.
23 April	Invercaibo	Tanker	Harland & Wolff	Belfast	United Kingdom	For Lago Shipping Co.
24 April	Hythe	Ferry	Harland & Wolff	Belfast	United Kingdom	For Southern Railway.
8 May	Dronning Maud	Passenger ship	Fredrikstad Mekaniske Verksted	Fredrikstad	Norway	For Det Nordenfjeldske Dampskipsselskap
8 May	King James	Cargo ship	Harland & Wolff	Belfast	United Kingdom	For King Line.
21 May	Nairnbank	Cargo ship	Harland & Wolff	Belfast	United Kingdom	For Bank Line.
22 May	Haslemere	Ferry	Harland & Wolff	Belfast	United Kingdom	For Southern Railway.
26 May	Inverruba	Tanker	Harland & Wolff	Belfast	United Kingdom	For Lago Shipping Co.
May	Weser	Fishing trawler	Seebeckwerft	Wesermünde	Germany	For Hochseefischerei Bremerhaven
18 June	Weirbank	Cargo ship	Harland & Wolff	Belfast	United Kingdom	For Bank Line.
23 June	Whitstable	Ferry	Harland & Wolff	Belfast	United Kingdom	For Southern Railway.
7 July	Asturias	Passenger ship	Harland & Wolff	Belfast	United Kingdom	For Royal Mail Line.
7 July	King Malcolm	Cargo ship	Harland & Wolff	Belfast	United Kingdom	For King Line.
14 July	Larchbank	Cargo ship	Harland & Wolff	Belfast	United Kingdom	For Bank Line.
21 July	Sulaco	Reefer ship	Cammell Laird	Birkenhead	United Kingdom	For Fyffes Line
5 August	I-53 (I-153)	Kaidai III-type submarine	Kure Naval Arsenal	Kure	Japan	For Imperial Japanese Navy
6 August	Rajputana	Ocean liner	Harland & Wolff Ltd	Greenock	United Kingdom	For P&O.
18 August	Fratton	Ferry	Harland & Wolff	Belfast	United Kingdom	For Southern Railway.
26 August	Jääkarhu	Icebreaker	P. Smit Jr. Shipbuilding and Machine Factory	Rotterdam	Netherlands	For the Finnish Board of Navigation.
1 September	Riga	Cargo ship	Travewerk Gebroeders Goedhardt AG	Lübeck	Germany	For Lübeck Linie AG
1 September	Temuco	Tender	Harland & Wolff	Belfast	United Kingdom	For Peninsular & Oriental Steam Navigation Company.
2 September	Gascony	Cargo ship	Harland & Wolff	Belfast	United Kingdom	For David MacIver & Co.
2 September	I-55 (I-155)	Kaidai III-type submarine	Kure Naval Arsenal	Kure	Japan	For Imperial Japanese Navy
3 September	Nelson	Nelson-class battleship	Armstrong Whitworth	Walker	United Kingdom	For Royal Navy
18 September	Ferdinand Niedermeyer	Fishing trawler	Seebeckwerft	Wesermünde	Germany	For Grundmann & Gröschel
24 September	Levernbank	Cargo ship	Harland & Wolff	Belfast	United Kingdom	For Bank Line.
25 September	Ro-65	Type L4 submarine	Mitsubishi	Kobe	Japan	For Imperial Japanese Navy
3 October	I-58 (I-158)	Kaidai III-type submarine	Yokosuka Naval Arsenal	Yokosuka	Japan	For Imperial Japanese Navy
3 October	Lexington	Lexington-class aircraft carrier	Bethlehem Shipbuilding Fore River Shipyard	Quincy, Massachusetts	United States	For United States Navy
28 October	Madrid	Cargo ship	Harland & Wolff	Belfast	United Kingdom	For Argentine Navigation Co.
29 October	Myrtlebank	Cargo ship	Harland & Wolff	Belfast	United Kingdom	For Bank Line.
14 November	Hamburg	Ocean liner	Blohm & Voss	Hamburg	Germany	For Hamburg America Line.
17 November	Scillonian	Ferry	Ailsa Shipbuilding Company	Troon	United Kingdom	For Isles of Scilly Steamship Company.
25 November	Childar	Merchant	Kockums	Malmö	Sweden	For Weil & Amundsen Rederi A/S, Halden, Norway
28 November	Marthara	Cargo ship	Harland & Wolff	Belfast	United Kingdom	For MacLay& MacIntyre Ltd.
30 November	Southgate	Tanker	Amble Shipbuilding Co. Ltd.	Amble	United Kingdom	For Anglo-American Oil Co. Ltd.
3 December	Olivebank	Cargo ship	Harland & Wolff	Belfast	United Kingdom	For Bank Line.
17 December	Rodney	Nelson-class battleship	Cammell Laird	Birkenhead	United Kingdom	For Royal Navy
17 December	Duquesne	Duquesne-class cruiser	Brest Dock Yard	Brest	France	For French Navy
19 December	Colonial	Cargo ship	Harland & Wolff	Belfast	United Kingdom	For T. & J. Harrison.
29 December	Roma	Cargo ship	Harland & Wolff	Belfast	United Kingdom	For Argentine Navigation Co.
31 December	William Scoresby	Research vessel	Cook, Welton & Gemmell	Beverley	United Kingdom	For the Crown Agents for the Colonies.
Unknown date	Aidie	Thames barge	Aldous Ltd.	Brightlingsea	United Kingdom	For R. & W. Paul Ltd.
Unknown date	Anna Leonie	Towed riverboat	Gebrüder Schäfer	Völklingen	Germany	
Unknown date	Barbara Jean	Thames barge	Aldous Ltd.	Brightlingsea	United Kingdom	For R. & W. Paul Ltd.
Unknown date	Carinthia	Refrigerated cargo liner	Vickers-Armstrongs Ltd.	Barrow-in-Furness	United Kingdom	For Cunard Line.
Unknown date	Grohm	Fishing trawler	Reiherstieg Schiffswerfte & Maschinenfabrik AG	Hamburg	Germany	For Deutsche Hochseefischerei Bremen-Cuxhaven AG
Unknown date	Las Palmas	Cargo ship	Deutsche Werft.	Hamburg	Germany	For Oldeburg Portuguese Line.
Unknown date	Leander	Cargo ship	Atlas Werke	Bremen	Germany	For Neptun Line AG
Unknown date	Pieter Corneliszoon Hooft	Ocean liner	Société des Ateliers et Chantiers de la Loire	St. Nazaire	France	For Stoomvaart Maatschappij Nederland, Amsterdam
Unknown date	Antinous	Cargo ship	Workman, Clark and Company	Belfast	United Kingdom	For New Egypt & Levant Shipping Co. Ltd.
Unknown date	Hubert	Tug	Abdela & Mitchell Ltd.	Brimscombe	United Kingdom	For F. A. Ashmead & Co. Ltd.
Unknown date	Lumen	Tanker	John Brown & Co. Ltd.	Glasgow	United Kingdom	For H. E. Moss & Co. Ltd.
Unknown date	Michael H.	Motor barge			United Kingdom	For J. Harker Ltd.
Unknown date	Nobleman	Tug	Cochrane & Son Ltd.	Selby	United Kingdom	For United Towing Co. Ltd.
Unknown date	Prizeman	Tug	Cochrane & Son Ltd.	Selby	United Kingdom	For United Towing Co. Ltd.
Unknown date	Ranchi	Ocean Liner	R. & W. Hawthorn, Leslie & Co. Ltd.	Newcastle upon Tyne	United Kingdom	For Peninsular & Oriental Steam Navigation Company.
Unknown date	Ranpura	Ocean Liner	R. & W. Hawthorn, Leslie & Co. Ltd.	Newcastle upon Tyne	United Kingdom	For Peninsular & Oriental Steam Navigation Company.
Unknown date	Reval	Cargo ship	Schiffs-und Dockbauwerft Flender	Lübeck	Germany	For Lübeck Linie AG
Unknown date	Skåneland	Cargo ship	Kockums Mekaniska Verkstad	Malmö	Sweden	For Angfartyg AB Tirfing
Unknown date	Sorrento	Cargo ship	AG Weser	Bremen	Germany	For Robert M Sloman Jr
Unknown date	Wiedau	Cargo ship	Norderwerft.	Hamburg	Germany	For Budsier Reederei & Berugungs AG.
Unknown date	4 unnamed vessels	barges	Alabama Drydock and Shipbuilding Company	Mobile, Alabama	United States	For private owners.
