= HMS Investigator =

Nine ships of the Royal Navy have borne the name HMS Investigator. Another was planned, but renamed before being launched. The name Investigator passed on to the Royal Indian Navy and after India's Independence, to its successor the Indian Navy where the lineage of naming survey ships Investigator continues unbroken.

- HMS Investigator (1801) was the mercantile Fram, launched in 1795, that the Royal Navy purchased in 1798 and renamed HMS Xenophon, and then in 1801 converted to a survey ship under the name HMS Investigator. In 1802, under the command of Matthew Flinders, she was the first ship to circumnavigate Australia. The Navy sold her in 1810 and she returned to mercantile service under the name Xenophon. She was probably broken up c.1872.
- HMS Investigator (1811) was a 16-gun survey brig launched in 1811. She was used as a police ship from 1837 and was broken up in 1857.
- HMS Investigator (1823) was a survey sloop purchased in 1823. Her fate is unknown.
- HMS Investigator (1848) was a discovery vessel purchased in 1848 to search for Sir John Franklin's lost expedition, and abandoned in the Arctic in 1853.
- HMS Investigator (1861) was a wooden paddle survey vessel launched in 1861 and sold in 1869.
- HMS Investigator (1881) was a wooden paddle survey vessel launched in 1881 and sold in 1906.
- HMS Investigator was to have been a paddle survey vessel. She was renamed HMS Research in 1887, before being launched in 1888.
- HMS Investigator (1903) was a survey vessel purchased in 1903. She was renamed HMS Sealark in 1904 and was sold in mercantile service in 1919.
- HMS Investigator (1907) was a survey vessel launched in 1907 and sold in 1934.
- HMIS Investigator was a survey vessel of the Royal Indian Navy and later the Indian Navy purchased in 1934 and sold in 1951.

== See also ==
- HMS Trent was renamed Investigator in 1951 after being converted to a survey ship for the Indian Navy.
- INS Investigator later Indian ships of that name
  - INS Investigator currently in service with the Indian Navy continues this lineage.
- RV Investigator, Australian research vessel built in 2013
