= INS Investigator =

List of ships named INS Investigator

The following ships of the Indian Navy have been named Investigator:

- HMIS Investigator was a survey ship of the Royal Indian Navy, launched in 1925 as the mercantile Patrick Stewart she was acquired by the Indian navy in 1934 and on conversion to a survey ship renamed Investigator. She was sold in 1951.
- INS Investigator (1951) was a River-class frigate of the Royal Indian Navy, launched in 1942 as HMS Trent she was transferred to India and renamed Kukri in 1946. Subsequently became INS Khukri and on conversion into a surveying ship in 1951 renamed Investigator. She was scrapped in 1975
- INS Investigator (J15) is a Sandhayak-class survey ship launched in 1987

== See also ==
- HMS Investigator - earlier Indian survey ships, from the British colonial era
