= INS Sutlej (J17) =

Ship built in 1993

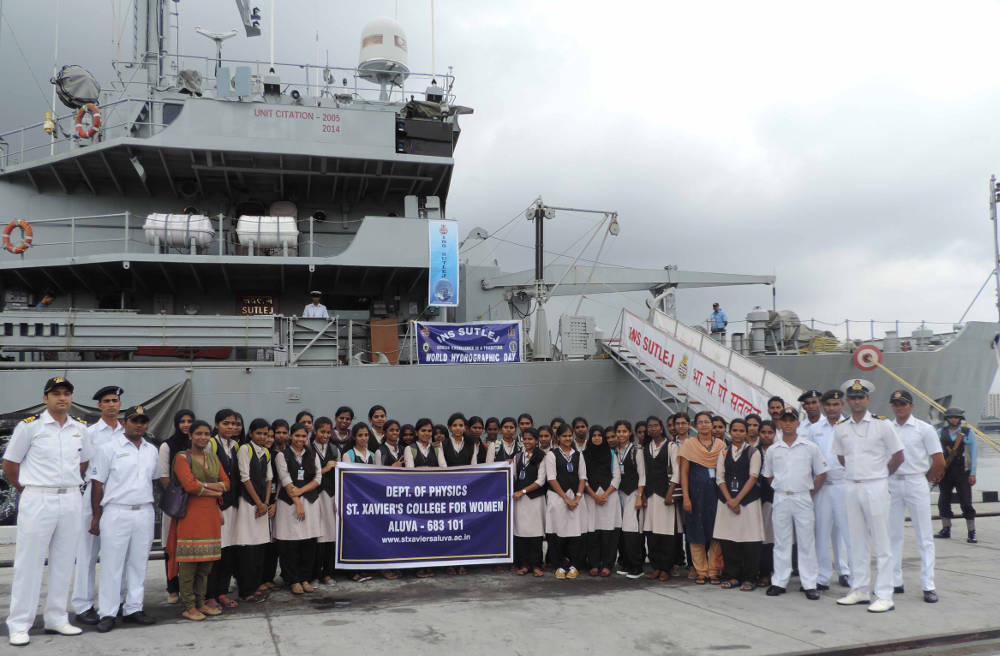

History

India
- Name: INS Sutlej
- Namesake: Sutlej River
- Builder: Goa Shipyard Limited
- Launched: 1 December 1991
- Commissioned: 19 February 1993
- Identification: IMO number: 9012020; Hull number: J17
- Status: Active

General characteristics
- Class & type: Sandhayak-class survey ship
- Displacement: 1,929 long tons (1,960 t) full
- Length: 87.8 m (288 ft 1 in)
- Beam: 12.8 m (42 ft 0 in)
- Draft: 3.3 m (10 ft 10 in)
- Speed: 16 knots (30 km/h; 18 mph)
- Range: 6,000 nmi (11,000 km; 6,900 mi) at 14 knots (26 km/h; 16 mph); 14,000 nmi (26,000 km; 16,000 mi) at 10 kn (19 km/h; 12 mph)
- Complement: 18 officers + 160 enlisted
- Armament: 1 × Bofors 40 mm gun
- Aircraft carried: 1 × HAL Chetak helicopter
- Aviation facilities: Helipad

INS Sutlej (J17) is a hydrographic survey ship in the Indian Navy, under the Southern Naval Command. Like other ships of the Sandhayak class, the ship is equipped with an Operating Theater and necessary equipment to attend to medical emergencies at sea.

== History ==
The ship was built by Goa Shipyard Limited and commissioned into service at Kochi Naval Base on 19 February 1993. The INS Sutlej was named after the HMIS Sutlej, the Black Swan-class sloop, which served in the Royal Indian Navy (RIN) during World War II.

The Sutlej is powered by two diesel engines and is capable of sustaining high speeds. It is equipped with a range of surveying, navigational, and communication systems. Its surveying systems include the multi-beam swath echo sounding system, differential GPS, motion sensors, sea gravimeter, magnetometer oceanographic sensors, side scan sonars, and an automated data logging system. These are designed to meet the stringent ISO 9002 international digital survey accuracy standards required for the production of electronic navigation charts and publications. A medium refit of the ship was completed from 2010 to 2012 at Cochin Shipyard, and from 2019 to March 2021.

The Sutlej was the first ship to enter the newly-built harbor of Karwar Naval Base in 2004. It has won several honors, including the Best Ship 2022–23, Best Survey Ship 2022–23, unit citation 2021, and Best Ship 2024–25.

== Survey work ==
In 2016, INS Sutlej completed the joint hydrographic survey of Mkoani harbour in Tanzania in order to prepare a navigational chart for port authorities. In the aftermath of the 2004 tsunami, the ship was deployed to Sri Lanka on the request of Sri Lankan authorities to conduct a hydrographic survey off the coast of Galle and Colombo harbours.

INS Sutlej has completed hydrographic surveys of Porbandar, Kandla, Kerala Coast, and Lakshadweep Islands. Special meteorological, geophysical, tidal, and tidal stream observations were carried out at Azhikkal, Kannur, Vadakara (Murat), Beypore, and Kadalundi River at the request of an external agency. In late 2021, it surveyed the Andaman and Nicobar Islands, Port Blair, and Myanmar. It also surveyed the Maldives in April 2022. The ship surveyed Gujarat and Goa in December 2022. In February 2023, it went back to Myanmar for three month survey.

On 29 September 2025, Sutlej called at Port Louis, Mauritius to undertake 18th Joint Hydrographic Survey with the Mauritius Hydrographic Service. Being conducted under the long lasting memorandum of understanding (MoU) signed during the 14th Joint Committee Meeting on Hydrography held in early 2025, the survey spanned over 35,000 sq nmi (120,000 km^{2}). Six officers from various Mauritian ministries had also embarked onboard the ship to receive training. The survey was completed on 26 October.

== Relief work ==
In the aftermath of the 2004 tsunami, the Sutlej, alongside sister ships INS Jamuna, INS Sarvekshak, INS Ghorpad and INS Kirch, were deployed as part of Operation Rainbow. The ships provided relief assistance in Sri Lanka in both government- and rebel-held areas. In 2016, the Sutlej and the patrol vessel INS Sunayna were sent from Southern Naval Command in Kochi to Colombo, to aid in relief work after Cyclone Roanu. In late 2016, the Sutlej provided relief assistance to the stricken fishing vessel Judan by towing them to the Kanyakumari port. The ship was also deployed to Kandla in the aftermath of the Gujarat earthquake to treat the injured.
