= Kongresshalle =

Kongresshalle (German for "congress hall") may refer to:

- Haus der Kulturen der Welt, formerly known as Kongresshalle, Berlin
- Alte Kongresshalle, Munich
- Kongresshalle on the Nazi party rally grounds, Nuremberg
- Congresshalle (Saarbrücken)
- Sport- und Kongresshalle, Schwerin
