= Chief Hydrographer =

Senior Appointment in the Indian Navy

- Flag of the Vice Admiral

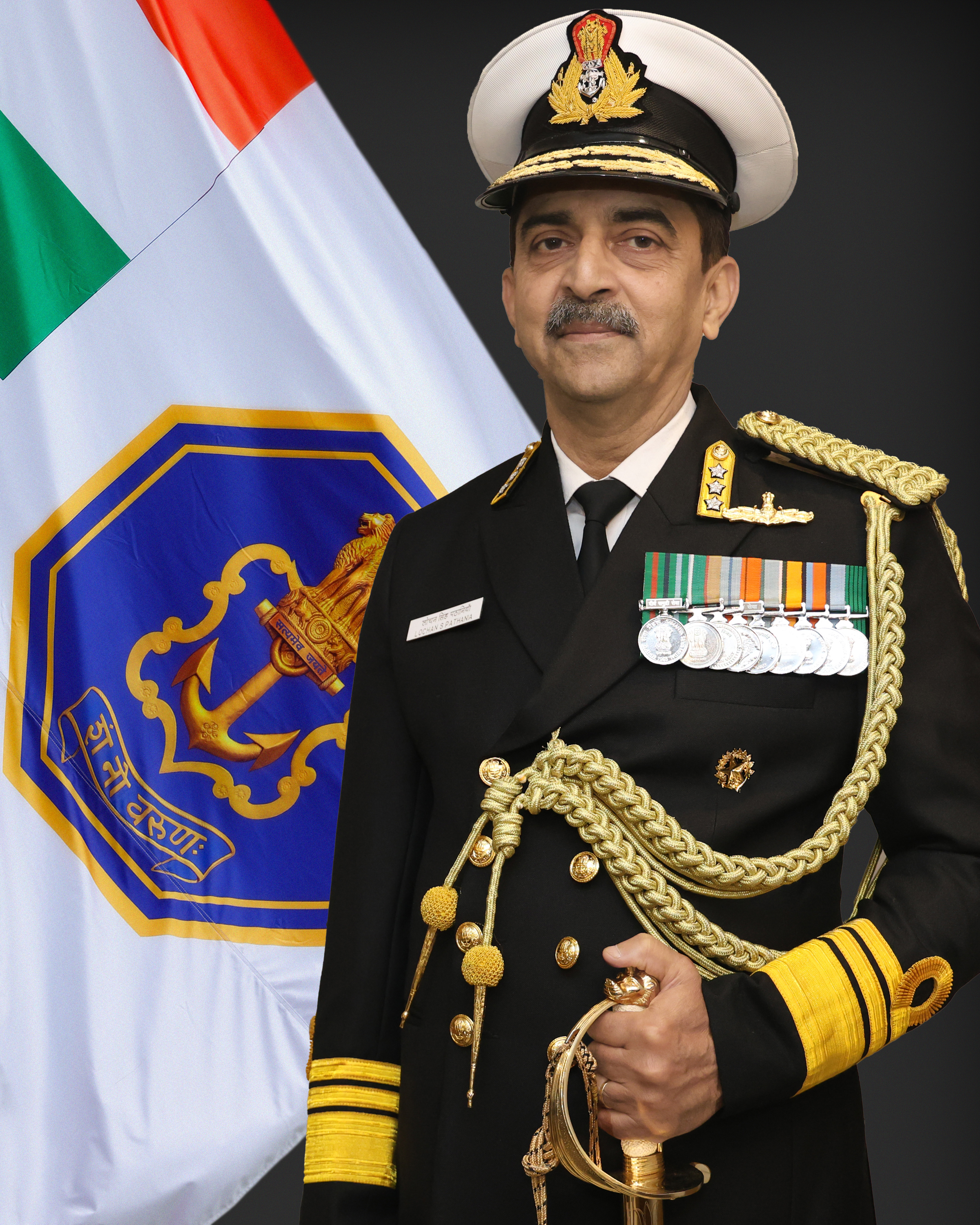
- Incumbent; Vice Admiral Lochan Singh Pathania since 1 February 2024
- Indian Navy
- Reports to: Vice Chief of the Naval Staff
- Seat: National Hydrographic Office, Dehradun
- Salary: Joint Chief Hydrographer

The Chief Hydrographer to the Government of India is a senior appointment in the Indian Navy. The Chief Hydrographer is the executive head of the National Hydrographic Office. The appointment is held by a Three star officer in the rank of Vice Admiral. The current Chief Hydrographer, Vice Admiral Lochan Singh Pathania, took over on 1 February 2024.

== History ==
The Marine Survey of India (MSI) was established in 1874 at Kolkata and was responsible for hydrographic surveys. It was headed by the Surveyor-in-Charge, who functioned under the Surveyor General of India. After the partition of India, the only survey vessel HMIS Investigator was allotted to the MSI. On 1 Jun 1954, MSI was relocated to Dehradun, its present location, and was renamed Naval Hydrographic Office. The appointment of Surveyor-in-Charge Marine Survey of India was re-designated Chief Hydrographer of the Navy. Captain SJ Hennessy took over as the first Chief Hydrographer.

The following year, on 26 November 1955, Captain Jal Cursetji, the senior most Indian officer in the Hydrographic Survey branch was appointed the first Chief Hydrographer. In 1964, with the increase in the responsibilities of the appointment, the Chief Hydrographer was re-designated as the Chief Hydrographer to the Government of India.

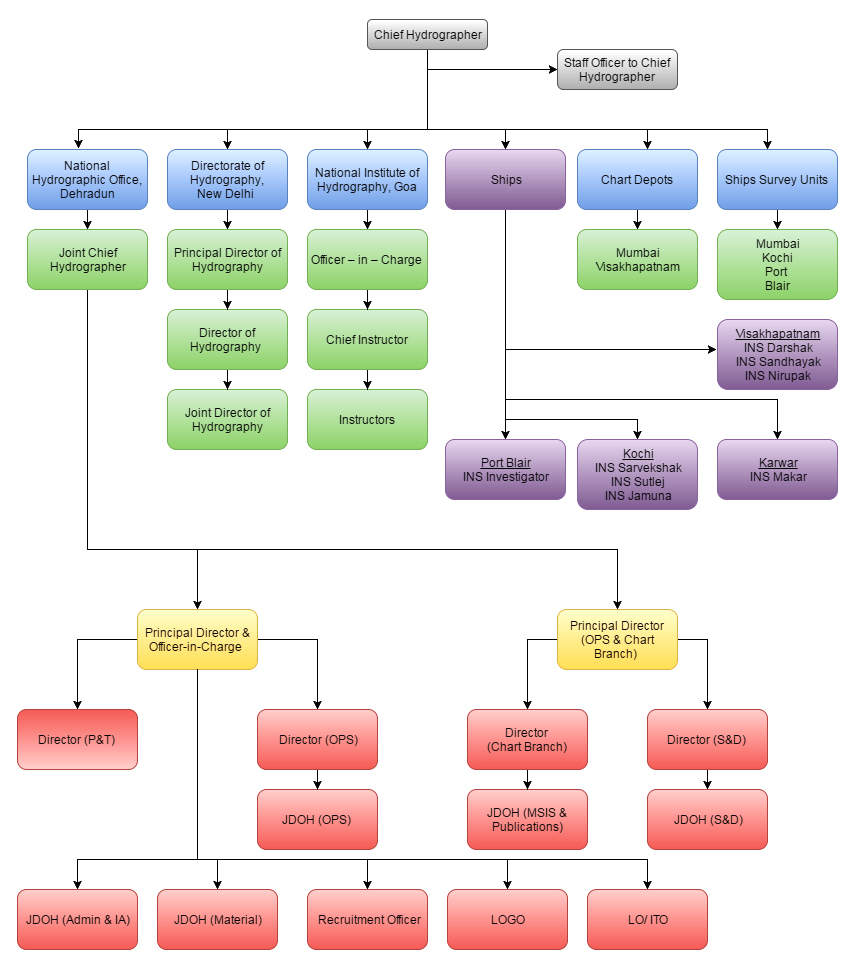
Organisational structure of the NHO.

Rear Admiral F. L. Fraser was the first Chief Hydrographer to be promoted to Flag rank, in 1977. Rear Admiral K. R. Srinivasan had the longest tenure, almost 10 years. Vice Admiral B. R. Rao was the first Chief Hydrographer to be promoted to three-star rank.

== Current organisation ==
The Chief Hydrographer is assisted by the Joint Chief Hydrographer, a two-star officer of the rank of Rear Admiral. The units under the Chief Hydrographer are:

- National Hydrographic Office, Dehradun
- Directorate of Hydrography, Naval Headquarters
- National Institute of Hydrography, Goa
- Survey vessels at Chennai, Karwar, Kochi and Visakhapatnam
- Survey Units at Karwar, Kochi, Mumbai, Sri Vijayapuram and Visakhapatnam
- Charts Depots at Mumbai and Visakhapatnam

== Chief Hydrographers ==
S.No.	Name	Assumed office	Left office	Notes
1	Captain S. J. Hennessy OBE, FRICS	15 August 1954	25 November 1955	
2	Captain Jal Cursetji	26 November 1955	27 October 1957	Later Chief of the Naval Staff.
3	Captain I. K. Puri	27 October 1957	28 May 1961	
4	Captain J. S. Mehra	29 May 1961	4 June 1962	
5	Captain S. Rajendra	5 June 1962	3 January 1966	
6	Commodore D. C. Kapoor AVSM	4 January 1966	30 July 1972	First Asian to serve as Director of International Hydrographic Organization.
7	Rear Admiral F. L. Fraser AVSM	31 July 1972 (Note: Promoted to Rear Admiral in 1977)	31 May 1982	First Chief Hydrographer to be promoted to Flag rank.
8	Rear Admiral A. G. Moraes	1 June 1982	29 December 1986	
9	Rear Admiral V. K. Singh VSM	30 December 1986	31 May 1991	
10	Rear Admiral P. P. Nandi AVSM, VSM	1 June 1991	8 June 1994	Died in harness.
11	Rear Admiral K. R. Srinivasan AVSM, NM, VSM	30 August 1994	30 June 2004	Longest tenure as Chief Hydrographer.
11	Vice Admiral B. R. Rao AVSM, NM, VSM	1 July 2004	30 September 2011	First Chief Hydrographer to be promoted to Vice Admiral.
12	Vice Admiral S. K. Jha AVSM, NM	1 October 2011	31 December 2015	
13	Vice Admiral Vinay Bhadwar AVSM, NM	1 January 2016	30 September 2021	
14	Vice Admiral Adhir Arora AVSM, NM	1 October 2021	31 January 2024	
15	Vice Admiral Lochan Singh Pathania AVSM	1 February 2024	30 June 2026	

== See also ==
- Survey of India

== Bibliography ==
- Doraibabu, M; Godbole, Amrut (2023), A Decade of Transformation: The Indian Navy 2011-2021, Harper Collins Publishers India, ISBN 9789394407909
- Hiranandani, G. M. (1999), Transition to Triumph: History of the Indian Navy, 1965-1975, Spantech & Lancer, ISBN 978-1897829721
- Hiranandani, G M (2005), Transition to eminence : the Indian navy 1976-1990, Lancer Publishers, ISBN 978-8170622666
- Hiranandani, G. M. (2010), Transition to Guardianship: The Indian Navy 1991-2000, Lancer InterConsult, Incorporated, ISBN 978-1935501268
- Singh, Anup (2018), Blue Waters Ahoy!: The Indian Navy 2001-2010, HarperCollins Publishers India, ISBN 978-9353025526
