= Munich Science Days =

The Munich Science Days (German: Münchner Wissenschaftstage) are a yearly four-day event in Munich since 2001.

== History ==
The Munich Science Days were led until 2008 by Karl Daumer and until 2007 were organized by the Association of German biologists. In 2008, the Münchner Wissenschaftstage e. V. association was founded and has organized the event since then.

The association includes representatives of the major scientific institutions from the Munich area, including all universities in Munich, Max Planck Society, Fraunhofer Society, German Aerospace Center, Helmholtz Zentrum München and others. In 2008, Frank Holl took over as lead, and the managing director since then is Steffi Bucher.

== Venue ==
Central venue areas of the previous events were the Marienhof (2001), the Technical University of Munich (2002-2003), the Bundesgartenschau (2005) and LMU Munich (2004, 2006–2008, 2010, 2011). In 2009, the Munich Science Days decentralized and took place in more than 50 locations in the greater Munich area. In 2012 the event took place at the Alte Kongresshalle at Theresienhöhe and Deutsches Museum for the first time.

At the Munich Science Days, experts from research groups, organizations, and institutes are prepared to explain, through dialogues, the sometimes difficult issues of science and technology, and to discuss questions of actual and perceived risks and benefits with visitors.

Lectures, discussions, panel discussions, workshops, films, exhibitions, Science booths, field trips, open house, and tours are offered during the event.

In conjunction to the event, are other events that take place at about 30 to 40other locations in and around Munich. The educational channel ARD-alpha records lectures and broadcasts them as a series since 2011. They can then be accessed in the Multimedia library of Bayerischer Rundfunk.

Participation in all events is free.

The Munich Science Days have become a permanent fixture in Bavaria, and attracts about 25,000 interested visitors annually and encourages participants to think and ask.

== Themes ==
- 2001: Life Science live
- 2002: Living Earth
- 2003: Threads of life
- 2004: Life and Technology
- 2005: Light and Life
- 2006: Living Research
- 2007: Life and Culture
- 2008: Mathematics – in the midst of life
- 2009: Ideas for the Future
- 2010: Energy: Basis of Life - Motor for the future
- 2011: Health Challenge!
- 2012: Sustainability - the basis of our future
- 2013: change in society - change the world
- 2014: Digital Worlds
- 2015: Cities of the Future
