= INS Nirdeshak (J19) =

Indian survey vessel

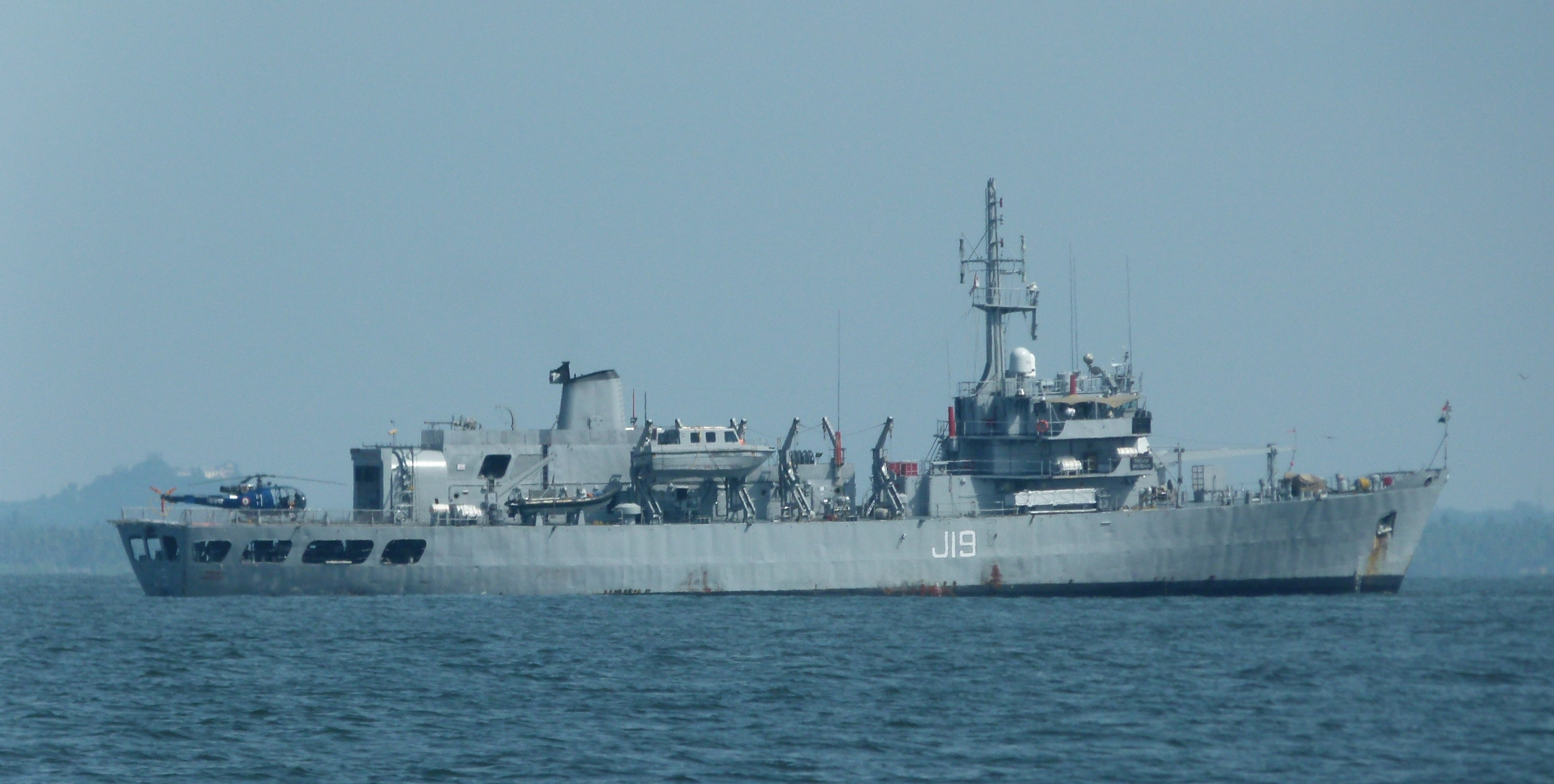

History

India
- Name: INS Nirdeshak
- Builder: Garden Reach Shipbuilders & Engineers
- Launched: 16 November 1978
- Commissioned: 4 October 1982
- Decommissioned: 19 December 2014
- Identification: IMO number: 7529275; Hull number: J19
- Status: Decommissioned

General characteristics
- Class & type: Sandhayak-class survey ship
- Displacement: 1,929 long tons (1,960 t) full
- Length: 87.8 m (288 ft 1 in)
- Beam: 12.8 m (42 ft 0 in)
- Draft: 3.3 m (10 ft 10 in)
- Speed: 16 knots (30 km/h; 18 mph)
- Range: 6,000 nmi (11,000 km; 6,900 mi) at 14 knots (26 km/h; 16 mph); 14,000 nmi (26,000 km; 16,000 mi) at 10 kn (19 km/h; 12 mph)
- Complement: 18 officers + 160 enlisted
- Armament: 1 × Bofors 40 mm gun
- Aircraft carried: 1 × HAL Chetak helicopter
- Aviation facilities: Helipad

INS Nirdeshak (J19) (Hindi: निर्देशक lit. director) was the sixth ship of the Sandhayak class of the Indian Navy. The ship operated as a hydrographic survey ship in the Indian Navy, under the Eastern Naval Command. Nirdeshak was equipped to prepare a variety of marine charts and maps for ECDIS system. The ship's secondary role was to conduct humanitarian aid and disaster management operations, wherein the ship could be converted into a hospital ship. The ship was also equipped with an operating theater and associated equipment needed to attend to medical emergencies at sea.

== Ship history ==
Built by Garden Reach Shipbuilders & Engineers and launched in 1978 and commissioned at the Visakhapatnam naval base, Nirdeshak was a hydrographic survey ship within a series of indigenously designed and constructed ships. The ship was equipped with a helicopter and a Bofors 40mm gun for self-defense as well as four survey motor boats, and two small boats.

Nirdeshak was also equipped with a wide range of surveying, navigational and communication systems. The next-generation surveying systems fitted on-board included a multi-beam swath echo sounding system, a differential GPS, motion sensors, a sea gravimeter, a magnetometer, oceanographic sensors, side scan sonars, an automated data logging system, a sound velocity profiling system, and a digital survey and processing system. The equipment allows the ship to meet stringent international ISO 9002 digital survey accuracy standards required for the production of electronic navigation charts and publications as per the International Hydrographic Organization.

Nirdeshak was powered by two diesel engines for propulsion that provide the ship a capability of sustained speed and the ability to undertake a variety of tasks and rescue operations. In the aftermath of a 2004 tsunami, the ship was equipped with 45 beds, seven doctors and 35 medical attendants and was deployed to Indonesia to aid in the relief work. The ship was also involved in a survey to excavate the ancient lost city of Dwarka in 2006.

INS Nirdeshak was decommissioned on 19 December 2014 at INS Kadamba, the naval base at Karwar.

== Survey task ==
The primary tasks of Nirdeshak included conducting hydrographic surveys, nautical chart preparation, cartography and training. To effectively conduct its work Nirdeshak was also equipped with ROVs, AUVs and USVs. In 2009, the ship conducted a hydrographic survey of St Brandon, Black River Bay, Tamarin Bay, Grand Bay and Riviere des Galets as per the Memorandum of understanding signed between India and Mauritius. In 2010, the ship conducted a hydrographic survey off the coast of Mauritius. The ship also performed a hydrographic survey off the coast of Seychelles around Praslin and Mahe, including approaches to the Port of Victoria. In 2006 the ship was involved in an archaeological survey off the coast of Dwarka, using its sonar equipment to survey and generate a 3D model of the seabed in preparation for the work. The excavation was carried out in association with Archaeological Survey of India, who guided the navy divers.

== Anti-piracy ops ==
In 2009 the ship conducted anti-piracy operations on request from the Military of Seychelles off the coast of Seychelles around the EEZ. While carrying out this duty, the ship, in coordination with Spanish frigate Numancia, apprehended nine Somali pirates when they were trying to hijack the Italian cruise liner MS Melody. Since 2010 India has permanently deployed a warship in Seychelles' waters to combat piracy.
