= INS Sutlej =

The following ships of the Indian Navy have been named Sutlej:

- INS Sutlej (U95), a Black Swan-class sloop de-commissioned in 1978
- INS Sutlej (J17), a Sandhayak-class survey ship commissioned in 1993
