= Anna Leonie =

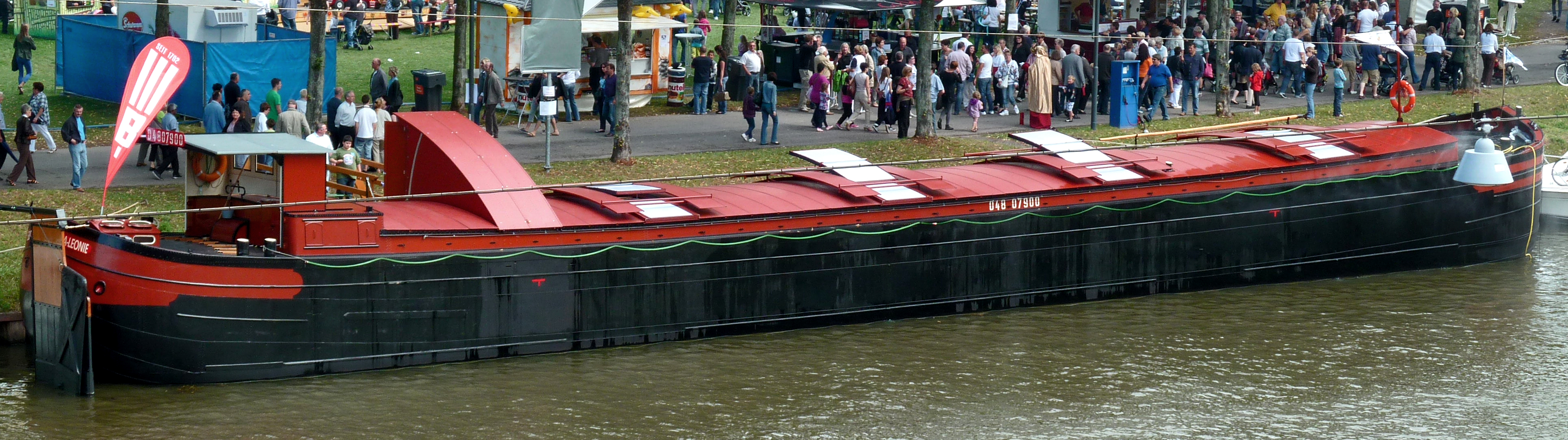
The Anna Leonie in 2011

Anna Leonie is a barge on the Saar maintained museum ship in Saarland, Germany built in 1925–26. Initially horse-drawn, she was later, from around 1939, towed by a tractor.

Towed vessels on the Saar were designated Penichen. Until 1992 there were towpaths along the waterways (Treidelpfad or Leinpfad in German). After these were eliminated the Anna Leonie was unable to be used any longer, because she remained without her own drive motor. In any case, she had lain tied up since the 1960s alongside the Congresshalle in Saarbrücken.

The Anna Leonie was ordered from the shipyard of the Gebrüder Schäfer in Völklingen on order from the boatman Johann Kind. He lived on board with his family, and named the ship after his two youngest daughters. His son continued to live on the ship until his death in 1987. By 2006 the Anna Leonie was the last of its kind and it was determined that it should continue to be maintained. The Saar fishermen's association (Fischereiverband Saar) was able to purchase her in 2007, and in 2008 send her to a shipyard for restoration. At the end of 2009 an exhibition "Ocean of the Future" (Ozean der Zukunft) was presented. In the future she will be used as an exhibition and museum ship along the Saar.
