= Naval Physical and Oceanographic Laboratory =

Indian government agency

Coordinates: 10.026°N 76.334°E

- Established: 1958
- Director: Dr. Duvvuri Seshagiri
- Location: Thrikkakara P.O., Kochi - 682 021., Kochi, Kerala
- Operating agency: DRDO

The Naval Physical and Oceanographic Laboratory or NPOL is a laboratory of the Defence Research and Development Organisation (DRDO), under the Ministry of Defence, India. It is situated in Thrikkakara, Kochi, Kerala. NPOL is responsible for the research and development of sonar systems, technologies for underwater surveillance, study of Underwater environment and underwater materials.

== History ==
The Indian Naval Physical Laboratory (INPL) was established in Kochi by the Indian Navy in 1952. It worked initially as a field laboratory for fleet support activities. It was merged with the Defence Research and Development Organisation (DRDO) in 1958 and started working on underwater systems. INPL was rechristened as Naval Physical Oceanographic Laboratory (NPOL).

Till 1990, NPOL functioned from within the Naval Base in Kochi. In 1990, it moved into a new 60-acre (240,000 m^{2}) campus at Thrikkakara, a suburb of Kochi. The new campus has a main technical complex and two residential complexes - SAGAR and VARUNA. The technical complex houses the main building, Abhinavam building and several test facilities including an acoustic tank. Besides the campus in Thrikkakara, NPOL has an offsite setup of underwater acoustic research facility at Idukki Lake, 100 km east of Kochi. Since 1995, NPOL has operated INS Sagardhwani, a 2000-ton oceanographic research vessel used for oceanographic data collection.

== Areas of work ==
NPOL is developing a technology called seabed arrays that will be laid over the seabed surface for ocean surveillance which will provide measurements and inform the control centre about the happenings underneath through satellite. DRDO is planning a dedicated satellite for the coastal surveillance system.

All the future inductions planned by the Indian Navy are to be fitted with NPOL designed sonars. The sonars under development are HUMSA NG (upgrade of the HUMSA sonar), the submarine sonars USHUS (for the Sindhugosh class) and PAYAL for the Arihant class.

Underwater acoustics is another area which NPOL is looking at. The Physical Oceanographic conditions which will decide the propagation of the sound waves inside water is studied with the help of DRDO's Research Vessel INS Sagardhwani and in-house developed Ocean models. Different Sonar Range Prediction models are also developed by NPOL in the recent years which are used by Indian Navy.

On 29 October 2024, NPOL placed an order for a new Acoustic Research Ship (ARS) with the Garden Reach Shipbuilders & Engineers, Kolkata. The order worth ₹490.98 crore (US$51 million) was signed in Kochi. The ARS will have an overall length of 90 m (300 ft) and a beam of 14 m (46 ft). It will be able to achieve speeds ranging up to 12 kn (22 km/h; 14 mph). The ship will have a minimum endurance of 30 days or 4,500 nmi (8,300 km; 5,200 mi). It will have a complement of 70 personnel. The vessel will have diesel-electric propulsion and 3 deck cranes will be fitted on board to handle research equipment. The ARS will be able to deploy, tow, and retrieve a variety of equipment, including acoustic modules; conduct high-resolution surveys of sound velocity profiles in time and/or space; and gather data on ocean tides and currents for use in survey optimisation, underwater mooring design, and offshore deployments. Additionally, it will be able to launch, moor, and maintain independent sonobuoys as well as gather data from them. The ship will be able to conduct acoustic system experiments at various speed regimes while remaining silent due to its broad speed range. The ARS will also be equipped with a Dynamic positioning mechanism that will enable it to hold its place until Sea State 4.
