= INS Darshak =

Indian survey ship

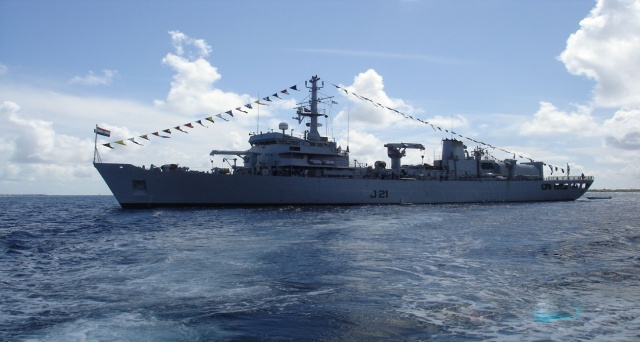
- INS Darshak in Seychelles

History

India
- Name: INS Darshak
- Builder: Goa Shipyard Limited
- Launched: 28 April 1998
- Commissioned: 28 April 2001
- Identification: IMO number: 9129536; MMSI number: 419207000; Callsign: VVYV; Hull number: J21
- Status: Active

General characteristics
- Type: Sandhayak-class survey ship
- Displacement: 1,929 long tons (1,960 t) full
- Length: 87.8 m (288 ft 1 in)
- Beam: 12.8 m (42 ft 0 in)
- Draft: 3.3 m (10 ft 10 in)
- Speed: 16 knots (30 km/h; 18 mph)
- Range: 6,000 nmi (11,000 km; 6,900 mi) at 14 knots (26 km/h; 16 mph); 14,000 nmi (26,000 km; 16,000 mi) at 10 kn (19 km/h; 12 mph)
- Complement: 18 officers + 160 enlisted
- Armament: 1 × Bofors 40 mm gun
- Aircraft carried: 1 × HAL Chetak helicopter
- Aviation facilities: Helipad

INS Darshak (J21) (Hindi: दर्शक lit.audience) is a Sandhayak-class hydrographic survey ship in the Indian Navy, under the Eastern Naval Command.

== Ship history ==
Built by Goa Shipyard Limited and commissioned into the Naval service at Visakhapatnam under the command of Captain S.S. Karnik in 2001, Darshak is the Indian Navy's eighth hydrographic survey ship to have been indigenously designed and constructed. Incidentally, the first indigenously built survey ship of the Navy, inducted in 1964 and decommissioned in 1990, was also named INS Darshak.

The new Darshak is equipped with a range of surveying, navigational and communication systems. The next-generation surveying systems provided onboard include the multi-beam swath echo sounding system, differential global positioning system, motion sensors, sea gravimeter, magnetometer oceanographic sensors, side scan sonars and an automated data logging system. These are designed to meet the stringent international/ISO 9002 digital survey accuracy standards required for the production of electronic navigation charts and publications.

The Darshak is powered by two diesel engines. The ship has a multi-role capability and can undertake a variety of tasks.

== Archaeological investigations ==
INS Darshak was used to investigate historically significant shipwrecks off the coast of Tamil Nadu. This included exploring the submerged remains of the lost city of Poompuhar in Tamil Nadu.

Darshak, under the command of Captain P. Jayapal, was deployed off Poompuhar, about 15 nautical miles (28 km) north of Nagapattinam. The ship carried out an extensive hydrographic survey and diving operations in the area off the Tharangambadi coast. During the operations, which lasted for nearly a month, the ship recovered some objects of archaeological importance. A U-shaped structure, located three miles (5 km) off the coast at a depth of 23 metres, was discovered during one of the dives. The structure was 85 metres in peripheral length and about two metres in height while the distance between the arms was about 13 metres. The structure was covered with marine growth and the centre was buried under silt. Local fishermen claimed that the structure was one of six such submerged structures.

Darshak also recovered a shipwreck supposed to be of a Dutch ship sunk by the French near the end of the 18th century. Three lead ingots, each about a metre long and weighing approximately 80 kg, were recovered by divers. They were marked with "W. Blackett" which was the name of a British company and the marking "1792" which is presumed to be the date of their manufacture. Moreover, the ingots bear the emblem of the Dutch East India Company.

Navy divers carried out further dives at the site and identified a two-metre long cannon which, although attached to the wreck, was deeply embedded in the seabed. The ship's diving team managed to recover the cannon, despite adverse sea conditions and the ship not being equipped to carry out excavations. The cannon, which was covered with extensive marine growth, is 2.1 metres in length and weighs approximately 700 kg.

== Survey work ==
INS Darshak in 2016 completed the hydrographic survey of Tanga Port, Tanzania coast for the Government of Tanzania. This survey work was of particular importance for the country's government due to upcoming oil pipeline being laid at the port from Uganda. In late 2016 the ship also carried out survey work off the waters of Mauritius to prepare two new charts of the Mauritian waters as per charting scheme agreed the two governments. The survey was useful for the tourism industry based in northern Mauritius. Areas off Mon Choisy, Grand Bay and other smaller islands in the north were surveyed comprehensively. Also survey data was collected for aquaculture site off Anse La Raie and deep sea transacts for scientific research at request of Mauritius Oceanography Institute. The survey is also expected to help in Deep Ocean Water Application Projects done on request of Continental Shelf Department of Prime Minister's Office. Earlier in 2015, INS Darshak conducted hydrographic survey in Seychelles for a period of 1 month concentrating off the coast of Port Victoria and in nearby areas covering the north east of the island of Mahé, Seychelles. On 3 March 2017 the ship was deployed to Sri Lanka for a two-month-long hydrographic survey trip in collaboration with Sri Lanka Navy. During the trip Sri Lanka Navy personnel joined their counterparts on the ship to undertake advanced hydrographic practices. The ship also made port calls to Colombo and Galle.

She participated at the International Fleet Review 2026 held at Visakapatanam.
