= INS Sandhayak (J18) =

Former survey ship of the Indian Navy

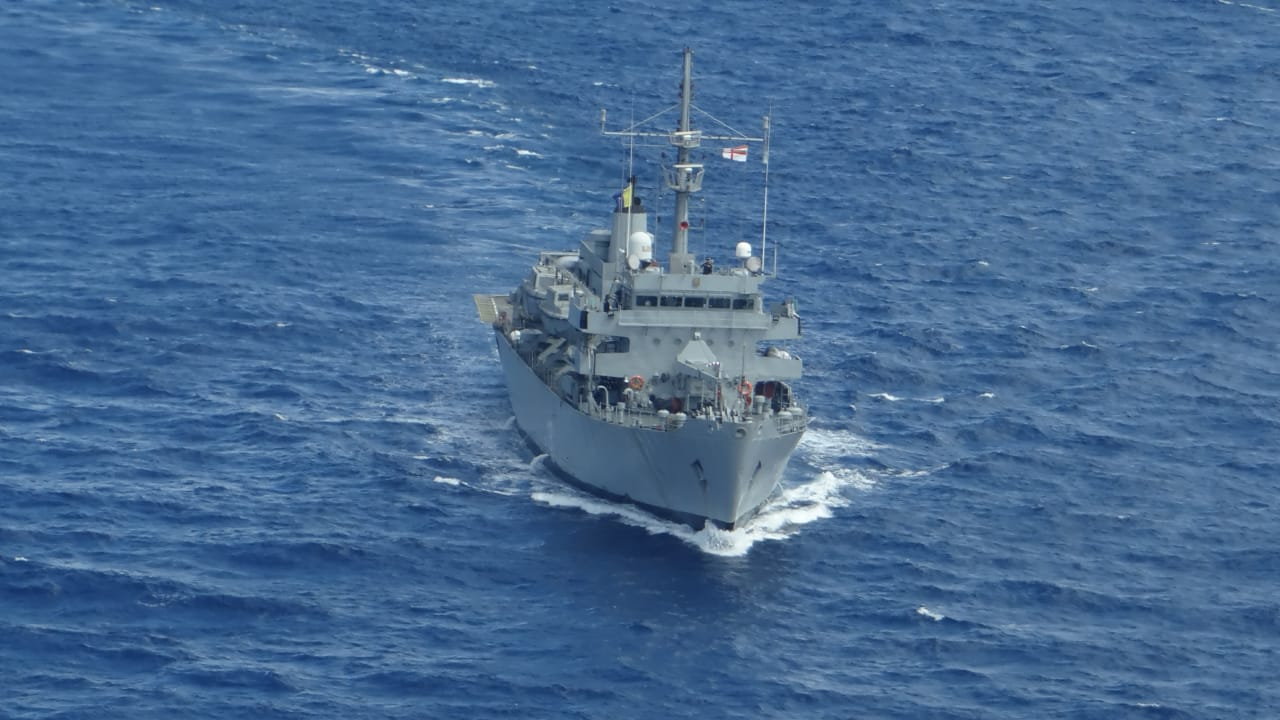
- INS Sandhayak (J18) at sea

History

India
- Name: INS Sandhayak
- Builder: Garden Reach Shipbuilders & Engineers
- Launched: 6 April 1977
- Commissioned: 14 March 1981
- Decommissioned: 4 June 2021
- Identification: IMO number: 7356771; MMSI number: 419100103; Callsign: ATZC; Hull number: J18
- Status: Decommissioned

General characteristics
- Class & type: Sandhayak-class survey ship
- Displacement: 1,929 long tons (1,960 t) full
- Length: 87.8 m (288 ft 1 in)
- Beam: 12.8 m (42 ft 0 in)
- Draft: 3.3 m (10 ft 10 in)
- Speed: 16 knots (30 km/h; 18 mph)
- Range: 6,000 nmi (11,000 km; 6,900 mi) at 14 knots (26 km/h; 16 mph); 14,000 nmi (26,000 km; 16,000 mi) at 10 kn (19 km/h; 12 mph)
- Complement: 18 officers + 160 enlisted
- Armament: 1 × Bofors 40 mm gun
- Aircraft carried: 1 × HAL Chetak helicopter
- Aviation facilities: Helipad

INS Sandhayak (J18) (Hindi: संधायक lit. coordinator) was the lead ship of the Sandhayak class of survey ships. The ship operates as a hydrographic survey ship in the Indian Navy, under the Eastern Naval Command. Apart from a helicopter and Bofors 40 mm gun for self defence, the ship is also equipped with four survey motor boats, two small boats. The ship can also analyse the level of pollution, sea level at various places, sea bed and marine wealth. Sandhayak is capable of conducting shallow coastal and deep oceanic hydrographic survey and collect oceanographic and geophysical data. The ship was decommissioned on 4 June 2021 after 40 years in service.

== Ship history ==
Built by Garden Reach Shipbuilders & Engineers and commissioned into the Naval service at Visakhapatnam naval base in 2001, Sandhayak is actually the Indian Navy's fifth hydrographic survey ship in the series indigenously designed and constructed.

Sandhayak is equipped with a range of surveying, navigational, and communication systems. The next-generation surveying systems provided onboard include multi-beam swath echo sounding system, differential global positioning system, motion sensors, sea gravimeter, magnetometer, oceanographic sensors, side scan sonars and an automated data logging system as well as Digital Survey and Processing System, sound velocity profiling system among others. The equipment allow the ship to meet the stringent international/ISO 9002 digital survey accuracy standards required for the production of electronic navigation charts and publications as laid down by the International Hydrographic Organization. Sandhayak is powered by two diesel engines and is capable of sustained speeds and can also undertake a variety of tasks including rescue operations. In March 2017, in a rare case of insubordination and indiscipline, three sailors were airlifted from the ship while it was conducting a training session off the coast of Paradip, Odisha in the Bay of Bengal.

== Survey Task ==
The primary task of Sandhayak includes hydrographic surveys, nautical chart preparation, with cartography and training. Sandhayak is also equipped with ROV, AUV & USV. In 2013 Sandhayak conducted hydrographical survey of the Islands of Andaman & Nicobar to update charts, as the seabed in the area has undergone drastic hydrological changes with regard to coastal, underwater profile after the 2004 Tsunami In 2015 Sandhayak was used to conduct a search of the sea floor of the missing Dornier 228 of the Indian Coast Guard and was successful in detecting the beacon signals of the missing aircraft. In 2016 Sandhayak conducted a survey off the coast of Rameswaram in a bid to find a new seaway that will allow larger ships to traverse the narrow Palk Strait.
