= INS Sagardhwani =

Marine acoustic research ship of the Indian Navy

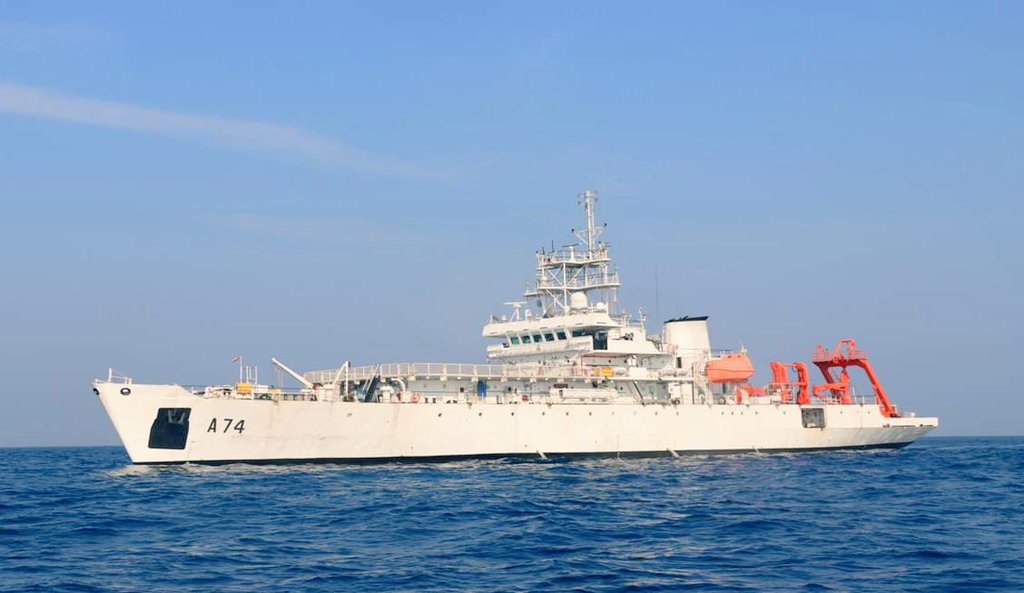
- Sagardhwani (A74) at sea

History

India
- Name: INS Sagardhwani
- Builder: Garden Reach Shipbuilders & Engineers, Kolkata
- Launched: May 1991
- Commissioned: 30 July 1994
- Home port: Kochi, India
- Identification: IMO number: 8802818; Callsign: VVXQ
- Status: Active

General characteristics
- Type: Research ship
- Displacement: 2,050 long tons (2,083 t) full load
- Length: 85.1 m (279 ft) o/a
- Beam: 12.8 m (42 ft)
- Propulsion: 2 × diesel engines; 3,860 hp (2,880 kW) sustained; 2 shafts; 2 auxiliary thrusters
- Speed: 16 knots (30 km/h; 18 mph)
- Range: 6,000 nmi (11,000 km) at 16 kn (30 km/h; 18 mph)
- Endurance: 200 days
- Complement: 80, plus 16 scientists
- Sensors & processing systems: Racal Decca 1629 radar at I-band frequency
- Aircraft carried: 1 × HAL Chetak
- Aviation facilities: Helicopter landing pad

INS Sagardhwani (A74) (Hindi : सागरध्वनि - Voice of the Sea) is a marine acoustic research ship (MARS) owned by the Naval Physical and Oceanographic Laboratory (NPOL), a Defence Research and Development Organisation (DRDO) laboratory, and is maintained and operated by the Indian Navy and based at Southern Naval Command in Kochi.

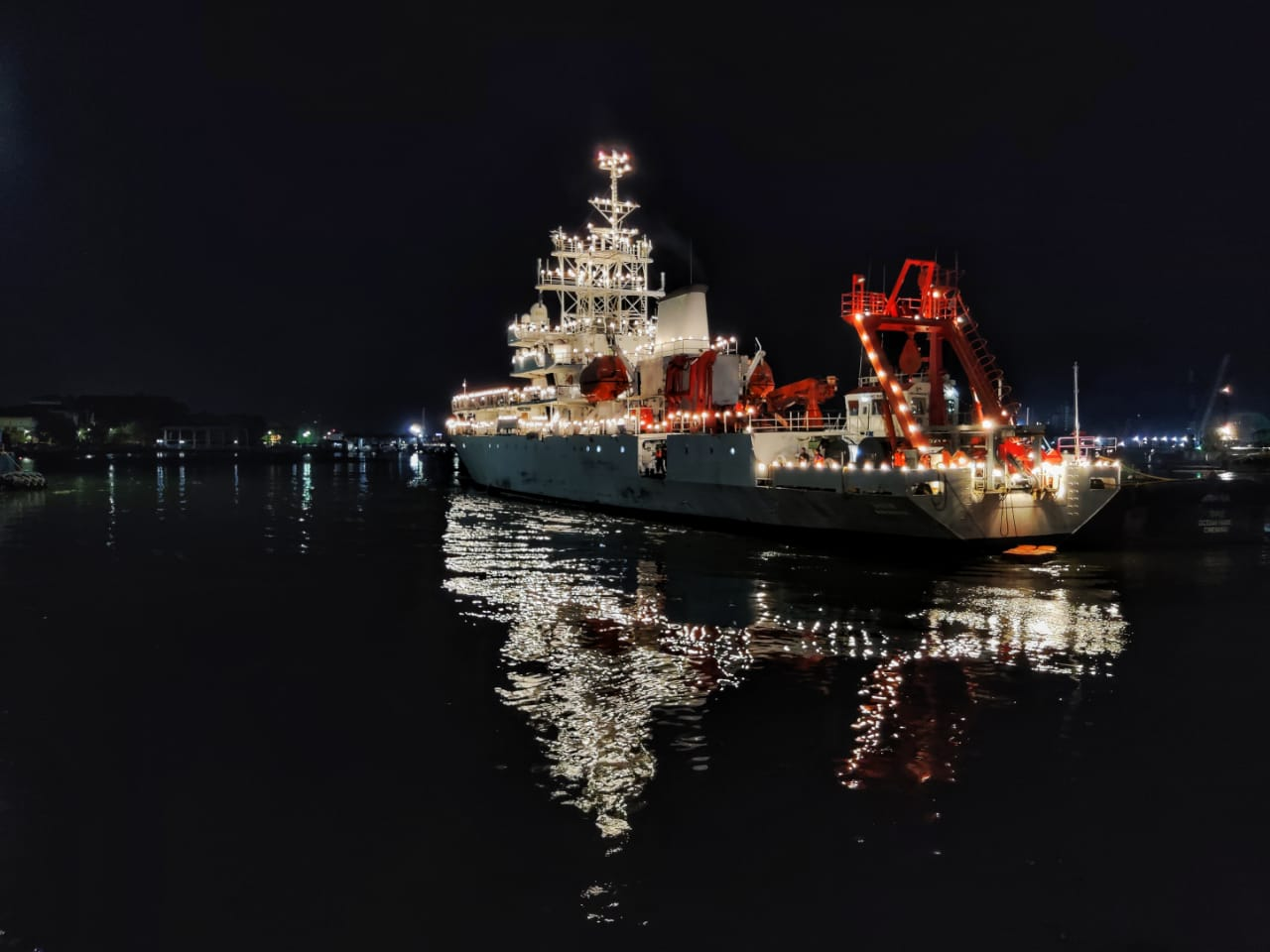
INS Sagardhwani in Kochi on the occasion of Navy Day in 2020

The ship was designed by DRDO's Naval Physical and Oceanographic Laboratory, Kochi, built by Garden Reach Shipbuilders & Engineers, Kolkata, launched in May 1991, and commissioned in 1994. It is similar in design to the Sandhayak-class survey ships, but with the superstructure positioned amidships and the helipad built forward. The vessel is designed to facilitate low noise and low vibration while carrying out acoustic programmes. It has floating floors for scientific laboratories, anti-vibration mountings for machinery and equipment, balloon launching container and wind weather radar to carry out those experiments. It is also equipped with VHF sets, marine radio and auto telephone exchange. It is operated in conjunction with DRDO.

Internally, the ship has eight laboratories for various scientific disciplines, and a mini-operating theatre with medical staff. At the stern is handling equipment for mooring and retrieving oceanographic and acoustic buoys. It can accommodate up to 82 persons, including 16 scientists, and a crew of 8 officers and 58 sailors.

== See also ==
- List of active Indian Navy ships
