= German trawler V 304 Breslau =

German trawler and patrol boat (1925–1940)

History
- Name: Weser (1925–39); Breslau (1939–40)
- Owner: Hochseefischerei Bremerhaven (1925–29); Nordsee Deutsche Hochseefischerei Bremen-Cuxhaven AG (1929–39); Kriegsmarine (1939–40)
- Port of registry: (Weimar Republic) Bremerhaven, Germany (1925–29); (Weimar Republic) Nordenham, Germany (1929–33); (Nazi Germany) Nordenham, Germany (1933-39); (Nazi Germany) Wesermünde, Germany (1939); Kriegsmarine (1939–40)
- Builder: Seebeckwerft
- Yard number: 462
- Launched: May 1925
- Completed: July 1925
- Commissioned: 30 September 1939
- Out of service: 17 September 1940
- Identification: Code Letters QVKM (1925–34); Fishing boat registration BX 178 (1925–29); Fishing boat registration ON 117 (1929–34); Code Letters DNNS (1934–40); Fishing boat registration PG 467 (1934–39); Pennant Number V 304 (1939–40)
- Fate: Wrecked 1940

General characteristics
- Class & type: Fishing trawler (1925–39); Vorpostenboot (1939–40)
- Tonnage: 295 GRT, 115 NRT
- Length: 43.90 m (144 ft 0 in)
- Beam: 7.35 m (24 ft 1 in)
- Draught: 3.35 m (11 ft 0 in)
- Depth: 4.16 m (13 ft 8 in)
- Installed power: Triple expansion steam engine, 64nhp
- Propulsion: Single screw propeller
- Speed: 10 knots (19 km/h)

V 304 Breslau was a German fishing trawler that was requisitioned in the Second World War by the Kriegsmarine for use as a vorpostenboot. Built in 1925 as Weser, she was renamed Breslau in 1939. She was wrecked at the entrance to the Noordzeekanaal in 1940.

== Description ==
The ship was 43.90 metres (144 ft 0 in) long, with a beam of 7.35 metres (24 ft 1 in). She had a depth of 4.16 metres (13 ft 8 in) and a draught of 3.35 metres (11 ft 0 in). She was assessed at 295 GRT, 115 NRT. She was powered by a triple expansion steam engine, which had cylinders of 35 centimetres (13 3/4 in), 55 centimetres (21 5/8 in) and 90.0 centimetres (35 7/16 in) diameter by 64.9 centimetres (25 9/16 in) stroke. The engine was built by Seebeckwerft, Wesermünde, Germany. It was rated at 64nhp. It drove a single screw propeller, and could propel the ship at 11 knots (20 km/h).

== History ==
Weser was built as yard number 462 by Seebeckwerft, Wesermünde, Germanay for the Hochseefischerei Bremerhaven. She was launched in May 1925 and completed in July. The Code Letters QVKM were allocated, as was the fishing boat registration BX 178. On 7 June 1929, she was sold to the Nordsee Deutsche Hochseefischerei Bremen-Cuxhaven AG. Her registration was changed to ON 117. Her port of registry was changed to Nordenham. In 1934, her registration was changed to PG 467 and her Code Letters were changed to DNNS.

Weser had been renamed Breslau by February 1939 and her port of registry was changed to Wesermünde. On 30 September, she was requisitioned by the Kriegsmarine for use as a vorpostenboot. She was allocated to 3 Vorpostenflotille as V 304 Breslau. On 17 September 1940, she was wrecked in a storm at the entrance to the Noordzeekanaal near IJmuiden, North Holland, Netherlands with the loss of four of her crew. The wreck could still be seen in 1969 near the north mole at the entrance to the canal.

== Sources ==
- Gröner, Erich (1993). Die deutschen Kriegsschiffe 1815-1945 (in German). Vol. 8/I: Flußfahrzeuge, Ujäger, Vorpostenboote, Hilfsminensucher, Küstenschutzverbände (Teil 1). Koblenz: Bernard & Graefe. ISBN 3-7637-4807-5.
