= INS Jamuna (J16) =

Indian research vessel

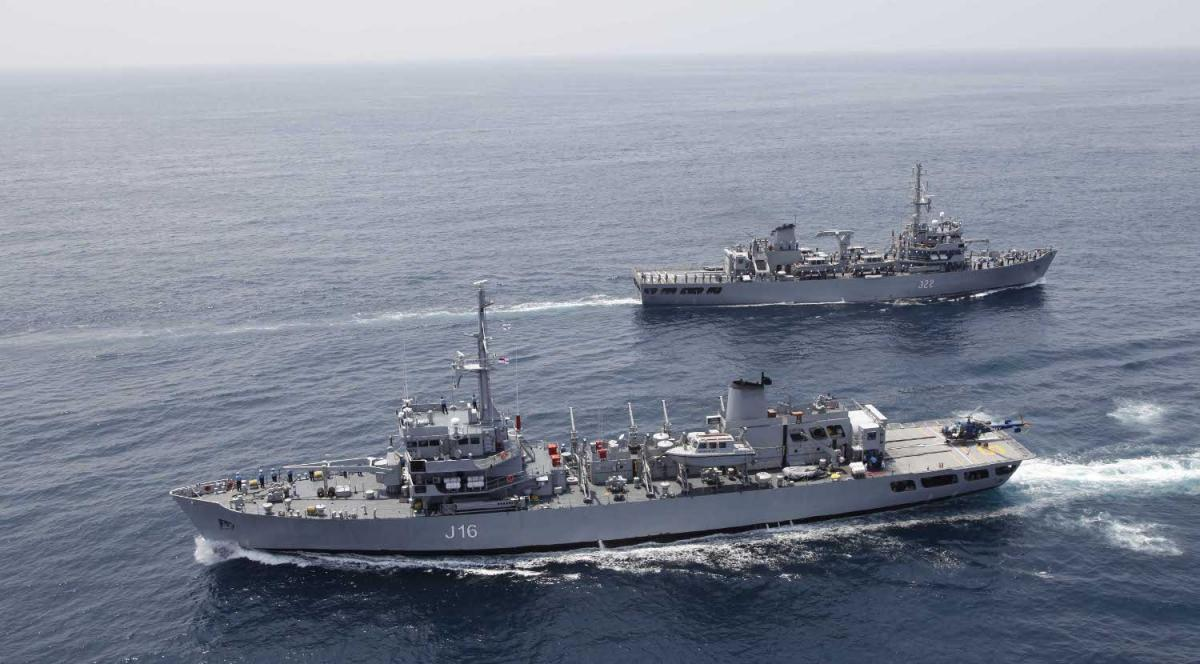
- INS Jamuna in the foreground

History

India
- Name: INS Jamuna
- Namesake: Jamuna River
- Builder: Goa Shipyard Limited
- Launched: 4 September 1989
- Commissioned: 31 August 1991
- Identification: IMO number: 9012018; Hull number: J16
- Status: Active

General characteristics
- Type: Hydrographic survey ship
- Displacement: 1,929 long tons (1,960 t) full
- Length: 87.8 m (288 ft 1 in)
- Beam: 12.8 m (42 ft 0 in)
- Draft: 3.3 m (10 ft 10 in)
- Speed: 16 knots (30 km/h; 18 mph)
- Range: 6,000 nmi (11,000 km; 6,900 mi) at 14 knots (26 km/h; 16 mph); 14,000 nmi (26,000 km; 16,000 mi) at 10 kn (19 km/h; 12 mph)
- Complement: 18 officers + 160 enlisted
- Armament: 1 × Bofors 40 mm gun
- Aircraft carried: 1 × HAL Chetak helicopter
- Aviation facilities: Helipad

INS Jamuna (J16) is a hydrographic survey ship in the Indian Navy, under the Southern Naval Command. Jamuna is equipped with a helicopter, a Bofors 40 mm gun, four survey motor boats, and two small boats. The ship has the distinction of being associated with relief work in the wake of the Gujarat earthquake, Tsunami 2004, as well as Operation Vijay during the Kargil war. Jamuna was also awarded a Mention in Dispatches.

== Ship history ==
Built by Goa Shipyard Limited and commissioned into the Naval service at Kochi in 1991, Jamuna is the Indian Navy's third hydrographic survey ship of the Sandhayak-class survey ships to have been indigenously designed and constructed. The ship is the namesake of HMIS Jumna, a Black Swan-class sloop, which served in the Royal Indian Navy (RIN) during World War II.

The new Jamuna is equipped with a range of surveying, navigational and communication systems. The next-generation surveying systems provided onboard include the multi-beam swath echo sounding system, differential global positioning system, motion sensors, sea gravimeter, magnetometer oceanographic sensors, side scan sonars, and an automated data logging system. These are designed to meet the stringent international/ISO 9002 digital survey accuracy standards required for the production of electronic navigation charts and publications as laid down by the International Hydrographic Organization.

The primary tasks of INS Jamuna include hydrographic surveys, nautical chart preparation, cartography, and training. The ship is also equipped with ROV, AUV and USV, similar to other sister ships of the Sandhayak class. Jamuna is powered by two diesel engines and is capable of sustained speeds. The ship is one of the most versatile survey vessels in the world. It can undertake a variety of tasks under trying conditions. After the tsunami of 2004, INS Jamuna undertook relief operations for the people of Sri Lanka when it was temporarily converted into a hospital ship. She participated at the International Fleet Review 2026 held at Visakapatanam.

== Search for INS Khukri ==
INS Jamuna was instrumental in locating the wreckage of INS Khukri (F149), a British Type 14 (Blackwood-class) frigate of the Indian Navy, which was the first warship sunk in action by a submarine since World War II. The ship sunk off the coast of Diu, Gujarat, India by the Pakistan Navy Daphné-class submarine PNS Hangor on 9 December 1971 during the Indo-Pakistani War. Furthermore, it also remains the post-Independence era Indian Navy's only warship to be lost in war to date.

Between 4 February and 6 February 2009, INS Jamuna was dispatched to search for Khukri. The survey ship deployed its side scan sonar, to take a picture of the bottom of the sea. One of the images obtained was of a large silt-covered hump on the seabed. This was located 80 metres (260 ft) below the sea surface and close to Khukri's last reported position. Jamuna's magnetometer also confirmed the presence of steel inside this hump. The object was nearly 300 feet (91 m) long, had a northeast-southwest orientation and seemed to be sitting on its keel with its mast sticking out of the silt, confirming that it was the sunken ship.

== Survey work ==
In 2013, INS Jamuna conducted a hydrographic survey off the Kenya coastline on the request of the Kenyan government to survey Manda Bay and Kiwaiyu Bay. Subsequently, the "first updated navigational charts" of the areas were presented to Kenyan authorities in 2014 by the Chief of the Naval Staff, Admiral RK Dhowan. The ship also conducted a hydrographic survey off the Dar es Salaam port in Tanzania.

== Ship upgrade ==
INS Jamuna is set for refit/upgrade by Reliance Defence and Engineering as part of the Rs 300 crores, 3 naval warship refit deal the company won in 2016. The refit is to be carried out at a facility at Pipavav in Gujarat. Apart from INS Jamuna, the two other warships to be refit are fleet tanker INS Deepak and offshore patrol vessel INS Savitri. The refit work is expected to be completed by April 2017.
