= INS Sarvekshak =

Indian hydrographic survey ship

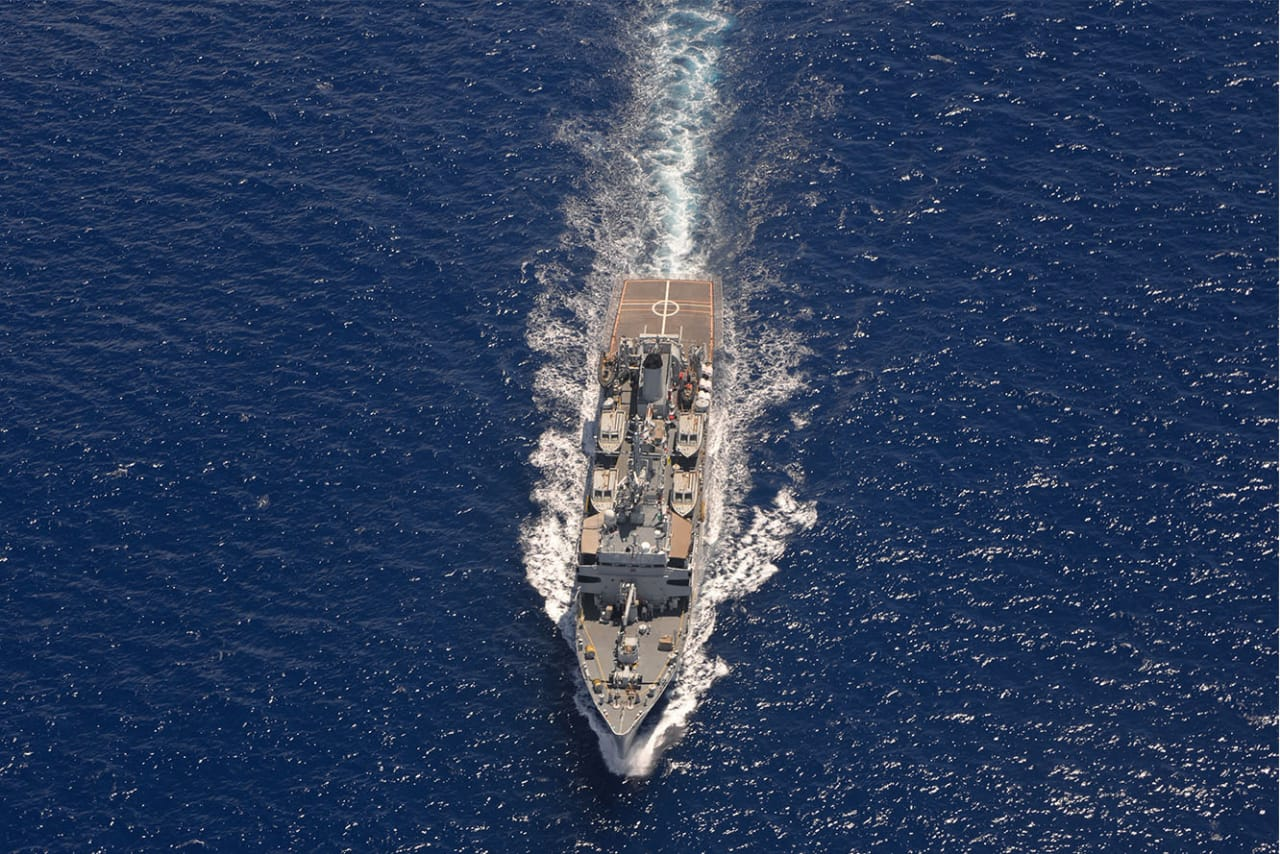
- INS Sarvekshak en-route to Mauritius.

History

India
- Name: INS Sarvekshak
- Builder: Goa Shipyard Limited
- Launched: 24 November 1999
- Commissioned: 14 January 2002
- Identification: IMO number: 9129548; Hull number: J22
- Status: Active

General characteristics
- Class & type: Sandhayak-class survey ship
- Displacement: 1,929 long tons (1,960 t) full
- Length: 87.8 m (288 ft 1 in)
- Beam: 12.8 m (42 ft 0 in)
- Draft: 3.3 m (10 ft 10 in)
- Speed: 16 knots (30 km/h; 18 mph)
- Range: 6,000 nmi (11,000 km; 6,900 mi) at 14 knots (26 km/h; 16 mph); 14,000 nmi (26,000 km; 16,000 mi) at 10 kn (19 km/h; 12 mph)
- Complement: 18 officers + 160 enlisted
- Armament: 1 × Bofors 40 mm gun
- Aircraft carried: 1 × HAL Chetak helicopter
- Aviation facilities: Helipad

INS Sarvekshak (J22) (Hindi: सर्वेक्षक, lit.surveyor) is a hydrographic survey ship in the Indian Navy, under the Southern Naval Command. Apart from a helicopter and Bofors 40 mm gun, the ship is also equipped with four survey motor boats, two small boats. The ship was awarded the runner-up trophy in the 2015 Innovation Trophy awards given out on Navy Day as an operational unit by Prime Minister Narendra Modi. The award was given for developing an innovative solution for tidal measurement during hydrographic surveys by use of land based terrain mapping equipment and floating buoys mounted with prisms. The award was accepted by Captain Rajesh Bargoti, the commanding officer of INS Sarvekshak.

== Ship history ==
Built by Goa Shipyard Limited and commissioned into the Naval service at Kochi naval base in 2002, Sarvekshak is the Indian Navy's eight hydrographic survey and perhaps the last ship under Sandhayak class to have been indigenously designed and constructed.

INS Sarvekshak is equipped with a range of surveying, navigational, and communication systems. The next-generation surveying systems provided onboard include multi-beam swath echo sounding system, differential global positioning system, motion sensors, sea gravimeter, magnetometer, oceanographic sensors, side scan sonars and an automated data logging system as well as state-of-the-art Digital Survey and Processing System, sound velocity profiling system among others. These systems allow the ship to meet the stringent international/ISO 9002 digital survey accuracy standards required for the production of electronic navigation charts and publications as laid down by the International Hydrographic Organization.

Capable of sustained speeds, Sarvekshak is powered by two diesel engines.

== Primary task ==
The primary task of INS Sarvekshak includes hydrographic surveys, nautical chart preparation, cartography and training. The ship is also equipped with ROV, AUV & USV. As part of protocol the ship also took part in International Defence Exhibition 2009 held at Abu Dhabi. In 2015 Sarvekshak, was deployed to Mauritius for five weeks to help in survey operations. INS Sarvekshak was also deployed in 2011 to Mauritius as part of survey operations to execute the following tasks in three phases.

1. Survey off Rodrigues for delineation of Continental shelf
2. Survey of Port Louis Harbour
3. Survey of passes off Mauritian Coast
4. Checking serviceability of survey equipment held with Government of Mauritius
5. Undertake training of Mauritian survey officers and NCG personnel

INS Sarvekshak had previously visited Mauritius in February 2006 and March 2007 to undertake hydrographic surveys. The survey work by INS Sarvekshak was of immense help to Mauritius with regards to fishing, ecosystem preservation and management, establishment of artificial reefs, delimitation of the Continental Shelf of Mauritius and safe navigation of ships and crafts. In 2007 the ship surveyed Port Mathurin, Rodrigues, which was last surveyed 133 years ago. In 2011 the ship was also deployed in Seychelles to carry out hydrographic surveys off the atoll of Aldabra, Picard Island, Polyminie and part of Malabar Island and Grande-Terre island on the request of Government of Seychelles as the last survey of the area was done back in 1960s. As a part of goodwill tour 20 students from Jammu and Kashmir also toured the ship in 2011.

On 26 December 2024, INS Sarvekshak reached Port Louis, Mauritius for Joint Hydrographic Survey.

She participated at the International Fleet Review 2026 held at Visakhapatnam.

== Solar power ==
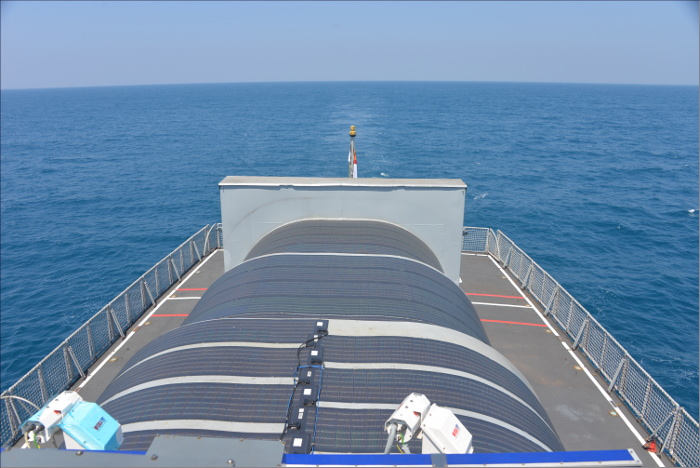
Flexible solar panels on board the ship

In 2017, Sarvekshak became the 1st ship of Indian Navy ever to deploy solar power. The installation cost was around Rs. 19 lakh. The estimated savings for a lifespan of about 15 years is around Rs. 1 crore. The current diesel generator consumes a litre of diesel to produce five units of electricity. Captain Rajesh Bargoti, the commanding officer of the ship, said, "It took about six months to put the entire system in place. We are now using solar energy for lights and a couple of air conditioners." The estimated profit generated in a ship service life of 25 years is Rs 2.7 crore in this small project alone. "Even if the system is used for 25 days in one year, the system can repay its cost in less than 10 years while protecting the nature," the Navy said.

Indian Navy claimed that the 300-Watt panels will generate about 5.4 kW solar power system, and avoid around 165 kg of carbon a day, "So in its 25 years life the total carbon saved is around 15 lakhs kg and 5.75 lakh litres of diesel by this innovation". Noting that the world is looking for clean, renewable sources of energy in order to protect and reduce the harm caused to the environment, the Navy said the deterioration of the environment is highly correlated to the production and usage of fossil-based fuels worldwide. The Navy said it has created a new mechanism to encourage the utilization and development of renewable energy resources.
