= Sandhayak-class survey ship (1981) =

Indian class of survey ships

Sandhayak class
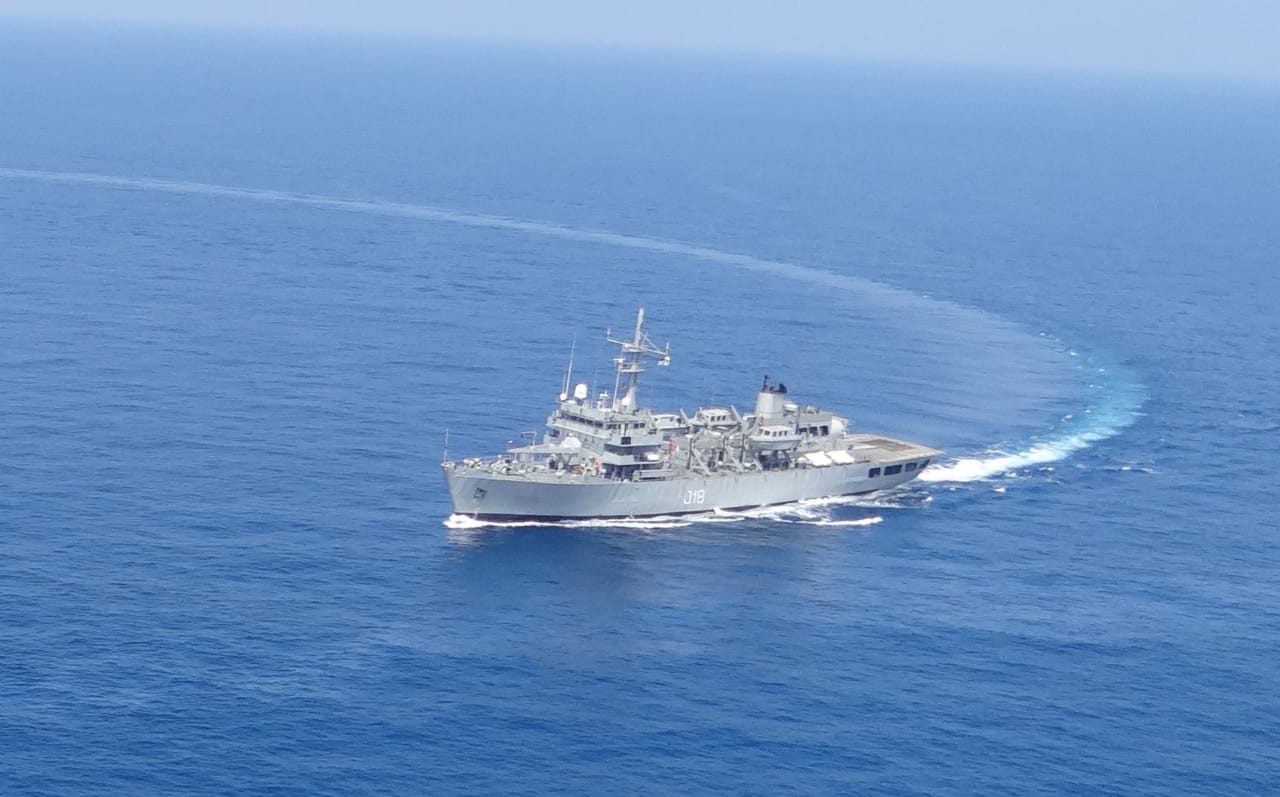
- INS Sandhayak (J-18) survey vessel at sea.

Class overview
- Builders: Garden Reach Shipbuilders and Engineers; Goa Shipyard, Ltd.
- Operators: India
- Succeeded by: Makar class
- Planned: 8
- Completed: 8
- Active: 5
- Retired: 3

General characteristics
- Type: Hydrographic survey ship
- Displacement: 1,929 long tons (1,960 t) full
- Length: 87.8 m (288 ft 1 in)
- Beam: 12.8 m (42 ft 0 in)
- Draft: 3.3 m (10 ft 10 in)
- Speed: 16 knots (30 km/h; 18 mph)
- Range: 6,000 nmi (11,000 km; 6,900 mi) at 14 knots (26 km/h; 16 mph); 14,000 nmi (26,000 km; 16,000 mi) at 10 kn (19 km/h; 12 mph)
- Complement: 18 officers + 160 enlisted
- Armament: 1 × Bofors 40 mm gun
- Aircraft carried: 1 × HAL Chetak helicopter
- Aviation facilities: Helipad

The Sandhayak-class survey ships are a series of eight vessels built by Garden Reach Shipbuilders and Engineers (GRSE), Kolkata and Goa Shipyard, Vasco for the Indian Navy. While Sandhayak, Investigator, Nirdeshak, Nirupak were built in GRSE; Sarveshak, Jamuna, Darshak, Sutlej were built by Goa Shipyard. The vessels equipped with four survey motorboats, two small boats and are powered by two diesel engines with a top speed of 16 knots (30 km/h; 18 mph). They have a helicopter deck and are also armed with a Bofors 40 mm/60 gun mount for self-defense.

The ships are equipped with variety of next-generation surveying systems fitted onboard including multi-beam swath echo sounding system, differential GPS, motion sensors, sea gravimeter, magnetometer, oceanographic sensors, side scan sonars, automated data logging system, sound velocity profiling system, digital survey and processing system, amongst others.

Working as part of the Indian Naval Hydrographic Department the Sandhayak-class survey ships are equipped with a range of surveying, navigational and communication systems. The ships are designed to undertake shallow coastal and deep oceanic hydrographic survey and collect oceanographic and geophysical data required for the production of digital navigational charts and publications. Besides carrying out their primary role of hydrographic survey, they can also assist in times of war and natural calamities as troop transports and casualty holding ships. The ships are also equipped with ROV, AUV & USV.

== Service history ==
Nirdeshak was decommissioned on 19 December 2014.

The lead ship of the class Sandhayak was decommissioned on 4 June 2021 after 40 years in service.

The third ship in the class Nirupak was decommissioned after 38 years of service on 29 January 2024 in Visakhapatnam.

== Ships in the class ==
Ships in the class
Name	Pennant No.	Builder	Commission	Decommission	Homeport	Status
Sandhayak	J 18	GRSE	14 March 1981	4 June 2021	Visakhapatnam	Decommissioned
Nirdeshak	J 19	GRSE	4 October 1982	19 December 2014	Visakhapatnam	Decommissioned
Nirupak	J 20	GRSE	14 August 1985	29 January 2024	Visakhapatnam	Decommissioned
Investigator	J 15	GRSE	11 January 1990	—N/a	Kochi	Active
Jamuna	J 16	Goa Shipyard Limited	31 August 1991	—N/a	Kochi	Active
Sutlej	J 17	Goa Shipyard Limited	19 February 1993	—N/a	Kochi	Active
Darshak	J 21	Goa Shipyard Limited	28 April 2001	—N/a	Visakhapatnam	Active
Sarvekshak	J 22	Goa Shipyard Limited	14 January 2002	—N/a	Kochi	Active

== Gallery ==
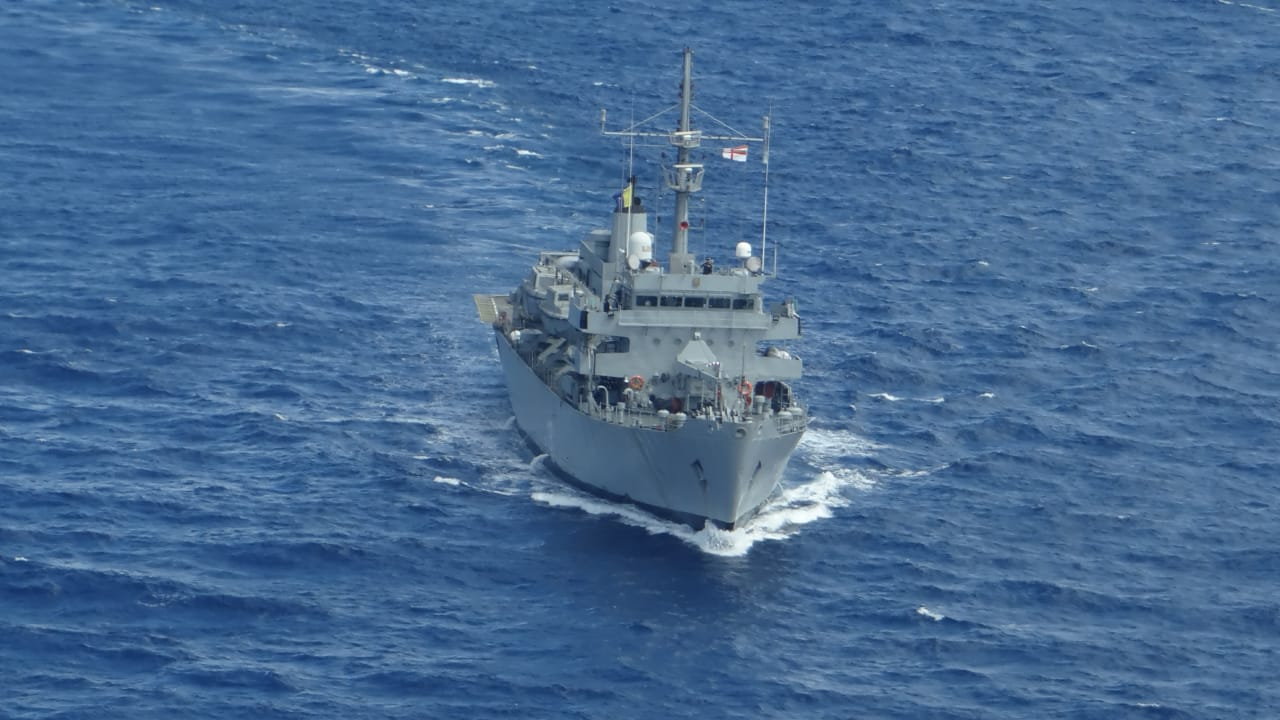
Sandhayak at sea.

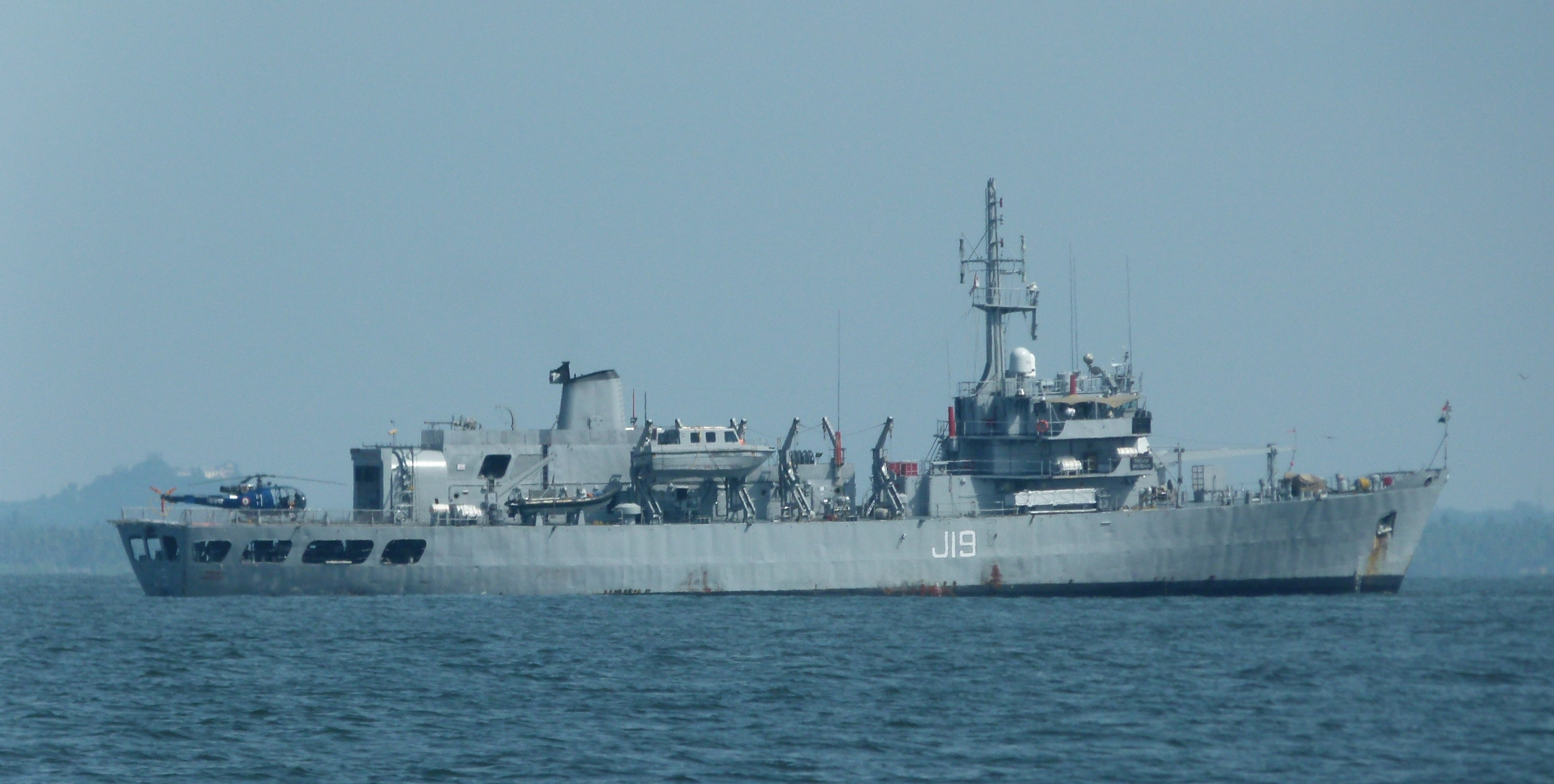
Nirdeshak during a survey mission.

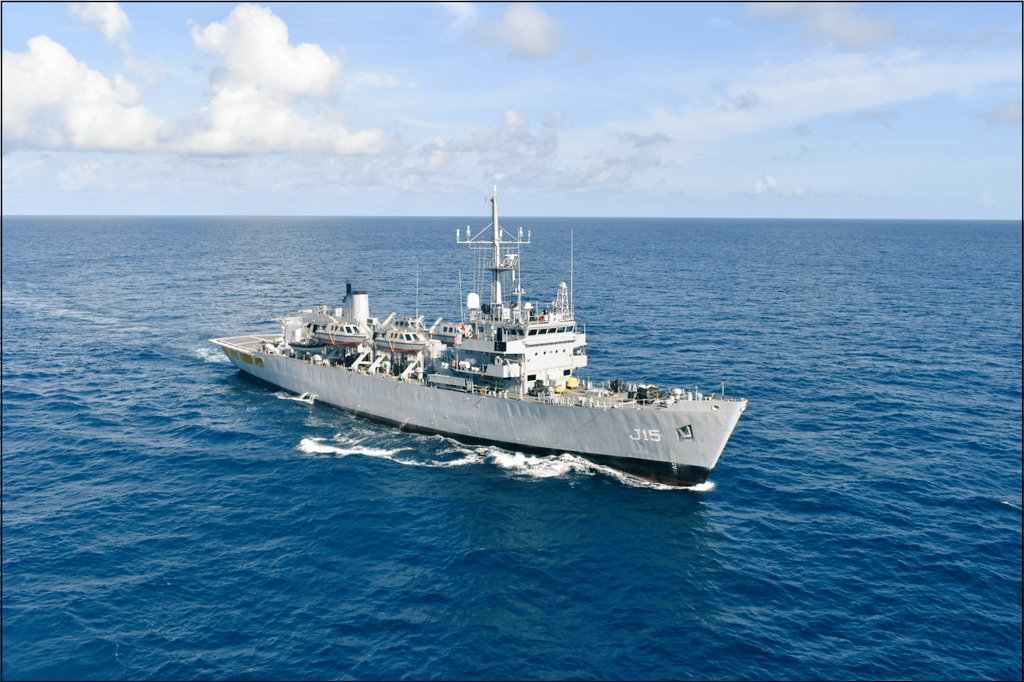
Investigator at sea.

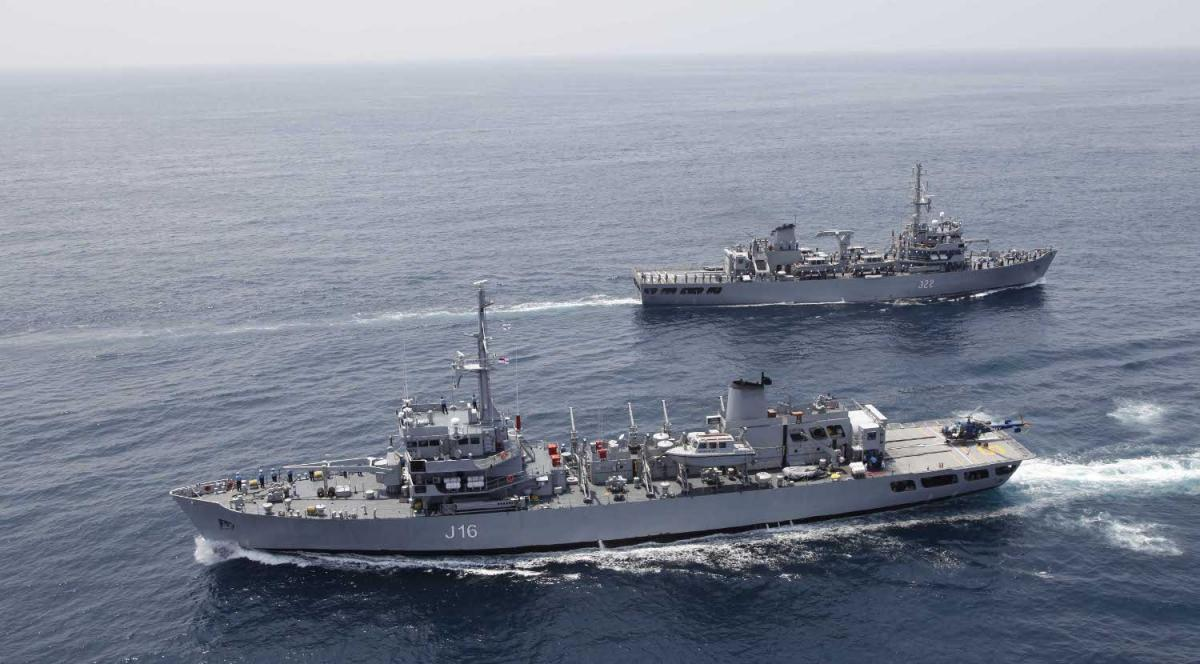
Survey tasking being undertaken by Southern Naval Command ships Jamuna and Sarvekshak on World Hydrography Day 2014.

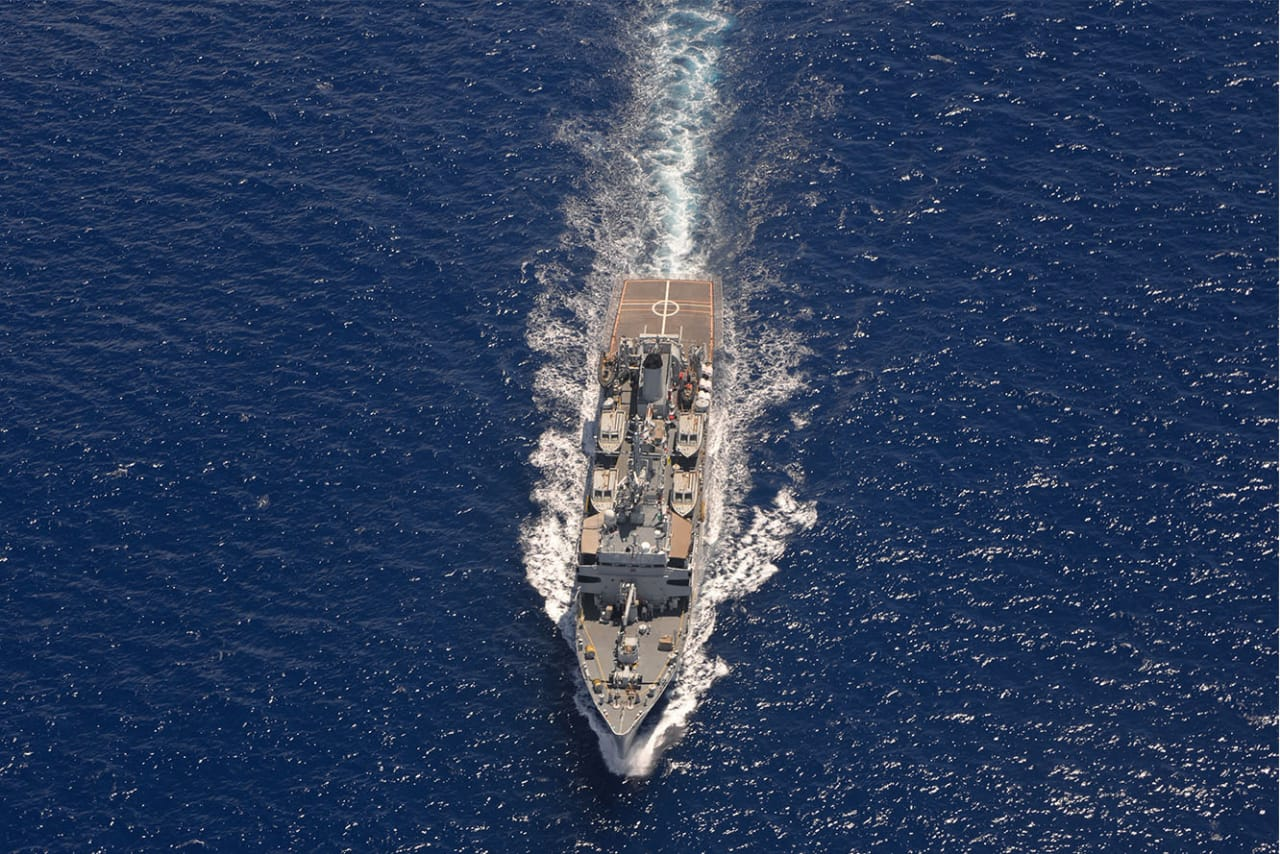
Sarvekshak en-route to Mauritius

== See also ==
- List of active Indian Navy ships
- INS Sagardhwani
