= German trawler V 413 Ferdinand Niedermeyer =

German fishing trawler and patrol boat

History
- Name: Ferdinand Niedermeyer
- Owner: Grundmann & Gröschel (1925–41); Kriegsmarine (1941–44)
- Port of registry: (Weimar Republic) Wesermünde, Germany (1925–33); (Nazi Germany) Wesermünde, Germany (1933–41); Kriegsmarine (1941–44)
- Builder: Deschimag Seebeckwerft
- Yard number: 439
- Launched: 18 September 1925
- Completed: November 1925
- Identification: Code Letters KRCJ (1928–34); Code Letters DEAB (1934–44); Fishing boat registration PG 367 (1925–39); Pennant Number V 413 (1939–44)
- Fate: Sunk 21 August 1944

General characteristics
- Class & type: Fishing trawler (1925–41); Vorpostenboot (1941–44)
- Tonnage: 266 GRT, 103 NRT (1925–35); 286 GRT, 12 NRT (1935–44)
- Length: 43.21 m (141 ft 9 in) (1925–35)
- Beam: 7.14 m (23 ft 5 in)
- Draught: 4.14 m (13 ft 7 in)
- Depth: 3.30 m (10 ft 10 in)
- Installed power: Triple expansion steam engine, 53nhp
- Propulsion: Single screw propeller
- Speed: 10 knots (19 km/h)

Ferdinand Niedermeyer was a German fishing trawler that was requisitioned in the Second World War by the Kriegsmarine for use as a vorpostenboot, serving as V 413 Ferdinand Niedermeyer. She was bombed and sunk off St. Peter Port, Guernsey, Channel Islands on 24 July 1944.

== Description ==
Ferdinand Niedermeyer was 43.21 metres (141 ft 9 in) long, with a beam of 7.14 metres (23 ft 5 in). She had a depth of 3.30 metres (10 ft 10 in) and a draught of 4.15 metres (13 ft 7 in). She was assessed at 266 GRT, 103 NRT. She was powered by a triple expansion steam engine, which had cylinders of 38 centimetres (15 in), 51.9 centimetres (20 7/16 in) and 90 centimetres (35 1/2 in) diameter by 60 centimetres (23 5/8 in) stroke. The engine was made by Deschimag Seebeckwerft, Wesermünde. It was rated at 53nhp. The engine powered a single screw propeller. It could propel the ship at 10 knots (19 km/h).

== History ==
Ferdinand Niedermeyer was built as yard number 439 by Deschimag Seebeckwerfte, Wesermünde for Grundmann & Gröschel, Wesermünde. She was launched on 18 September 1925 and completed in November. The Code Letters KRCJ were allocated, as was the fishing boat registration PG 367. In 1934, her Code Letters were changed to DEAB. In 1935, she was lengthened. She was now assessed at 286 GRT, 112 NRT.

She was scheduled to take part in Unternehmen Seelöwe. On 23 May 1941, Ferdinand Niedermeyer was requisitioned by the Kriegsmarine for use as a vorpostenboot. She was allocated to 4 Vorpostenflotille as V 413 Ferdinand Niedermeyer. On 21 August 1944, she was sunk in the Bay of Biscay in an attack by Allied aircraft off Bayonne, Basses-Pyrénées, France. Also reported as sunk by Bristol Beaufighter aircraft of 236 Squadron, Royal Air Force and 404 Squadron, Royal Canadian Air Force off Le Verdon-sur-Mer, Gironde, France.

== Sources ==
- Gröner, Erich (1993). Die deutschen Kriegsschiffe 1815-1945 (in German). Vol. 8/I: Flußfahrzeuge, Ujäger, Vorpostenboote, Hilfsminensucher, Küstenschutzverbände (Teil 1). Koblenz: Bernard & Graefe. ISBN 3-7637-4807-5.
