= HMS Investigator (1823) =

History

United Kingdom
- Name: HMS Investigator
- Acquired: 1823
- Fate: Unknown

General characteristics
- Class & type: survey sloop
- Tons burthen: 450 tons
- Propulsion: Sails
- Sail plan: sloop

HMS Investigator was a survey sloop of the Royal Navy. She was purchased in 1823 for service in Indian waters.

On 1 November 1825 the eight-man crew of Investigator′s tender, the cutter Star, abandoned Star in the North Sea; the British merchant ship Amity rescued them. On 8 November 1825, Investigator herself was "wrecked" in the North Sea, but she survived and reached Harwich, Essex, England, on 11 November 1825.

Investigator′s fate is unknown.
