= INS Nirupak =

Indian Survey vessel

History

India
- Name: INS Nirupak
- Builder: Garden Reach Shipbuilders and Engineers
- Launched: 4 June 1981
- Commissioned: 14 August 1985
- Decommissioned: 29 January 2024
- Identification: IMO number: 7529287; Hull number: J20
- Status: Decommissioned

General characteristics
- Class & type: Sandhayak-class survey ship
- Displacement: 1,929 long tons (1,960 t) full
- Length: 87.8 m (288 ft 1 in)
- Beam: 12.8 m (42 ft 0 in)
- Draft: 3.3 m (10 ft 10 in)
- Speed: 16 knots (30 km/h; 18 mph)
- Range: 6,000 nmi (11,000 km; 6,900 mi) at 14 knots (26 km/h; 16 mph); 14,000 nmi (26,000 km; 16,000 mi) at 10 kn (19 km/h; 12 mph)
- Complement: 18 officers + 160 enlisted
- Armament: 1 × Bofors 40 mm gun
- Aircraft carried: 1 × HAL Chetak helicopter
- Aviation facilities: Helipad

INS Nirupak (J20) (Hindi: निरूपक lit. Indicator) was a Sandhayak-class hydrographic survey ship in the Indian Navy. The ship was built by Garden Reach Shipbuilders & Engineers and commissioned into the Indian navy at Visakhapatnam naval base in 1985 under Eastern Naval Command.

The third ship in the class Nirupak was decommissioned after 38 years of service on 29 January 2024 in Visakhapatnam.

== Equipment ==
The ship is equipped with ROV, AUV & USV. Apart from a helicopter and Bofors 40 mm gun for self defense, the ship is also equipped with four survey motor boats and two small boats. Nirupak is the second ship to have been indigenously designed and constructed, commissioned after INS Sandhayak under the Sandhayak class. As a hospital ship, Nirupak has taken part in disaster relief exercises. On a goodwill mission in 2010 the ship visited Trincomalee Port.

== Tasks ==
The primary tasks of INS Nirupak include hydrographic surveys, nautical chart preparation, cartography & training. The ship also has disaster relief capabilities because it can operate as a hospital.

== Operations ==
Nirupak was one of the first ships of the Indian Navy alongside INS Khukri to be involved in relief operations after a 2004 Tsunami where it provided relief operations under Operation Gambhir as a hospital ship to Indonesia. INS Nirupak was awarded the Admiral Jal Cursetji Rolling Trophy for best survey ship in the years 1994, 1995, 2005 and 2009. It was actively engaged in Humanitarian Assistance and Disaster Relief (HADR) operations, including Operation Gambhir in 2004, offering critical relief as a hospital ship to Indonesia. In 2016 the ship was also involved in searching for the missing Antonov 32 of the Indian Navy that crashed over the Bay of Bengal. Some articles of wreckage of the aircraft were later found .
