= Alte Kongresshalle =

Coordinates: 48°07′55.5″N 11°32′40″E

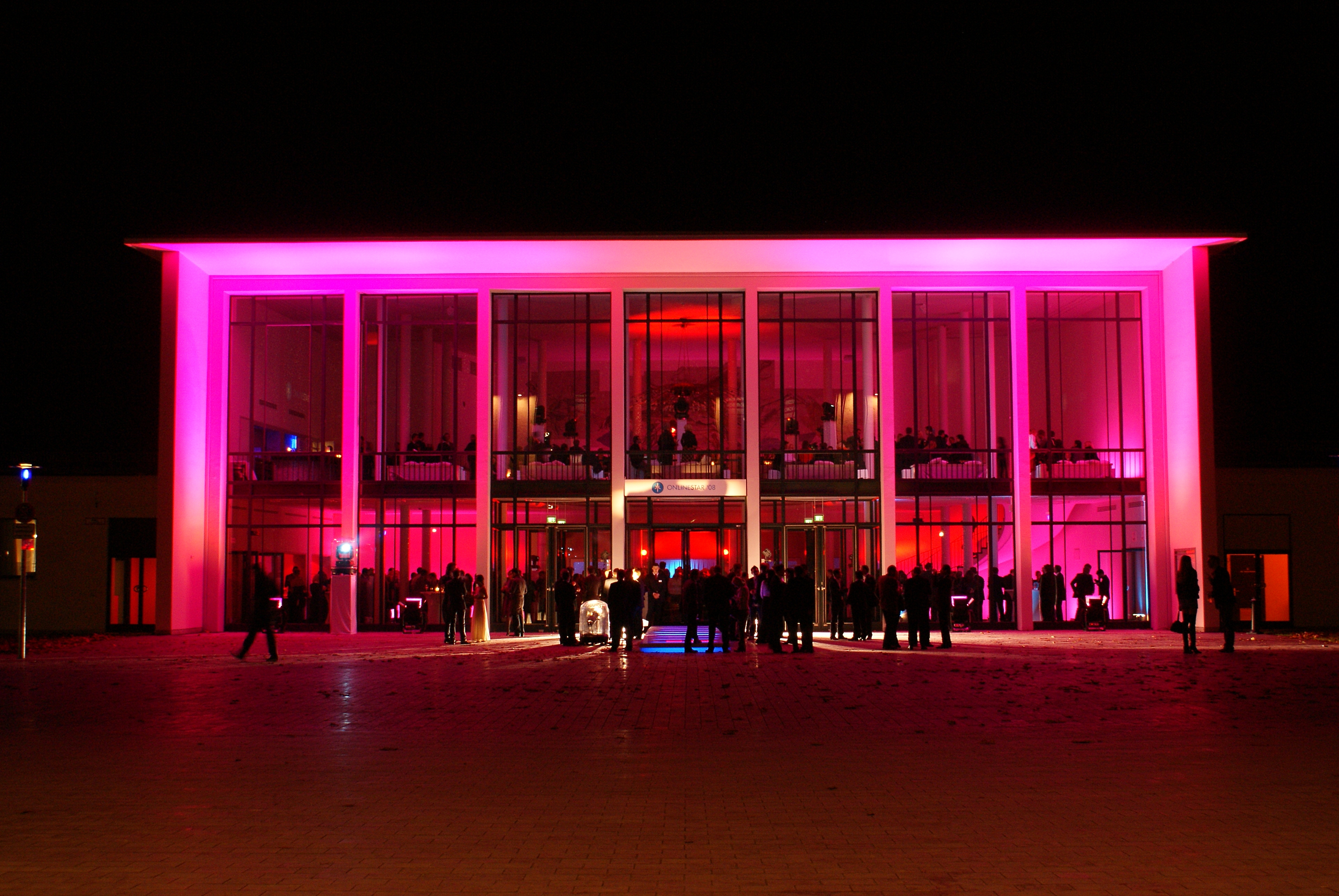
Alte Kongresshalle

The Alte Kongresshalle is a cultural and event center in Munich, Germany.

== History ==
The architects Etzold, Strobl and Freymuth designed Alte Kongresshalle as part of the Convention Center at Messe München, which was modern for its time, in the years 1952/53. In its day, it was the largest hall of its kind. After the departure of Messe München in 1998, the hall was temporarily used by the Munich Construction Agency.

== Current situation ==
The Edith-Haberland-Wagner Foundation took over the property in 2004. The foundation restored and renovated the building in compliance with the monument protection provisions. The outdated technical components and the suspended ceilings were renewed, and the covered patio that existed during the Messe was exposed. The replanting was based on the original plan from the 1950s.

== Literature ==
- Büttner, Claudia (2004). Kunstprojekte Riem: öffentliche Kunst für einen Münchner Stadtteil (in German). Vienna: Springer. p. 245. ISBN 3-211-20346-X.
