= Congresshalle (Saarbrücken) =

Concert hall in Saarbrücken, Germany

Coordinates: 49°14′16″N 6°59′15″E

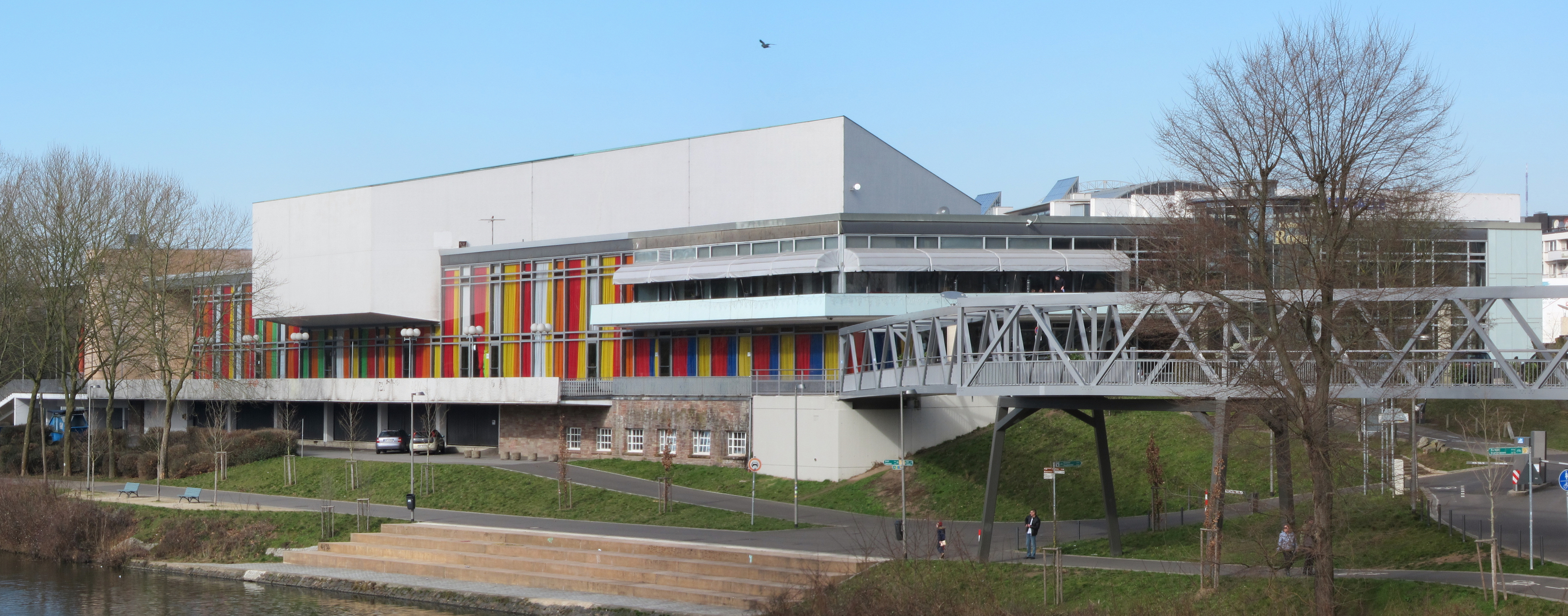
- Main hall, Kongreßhalle
- Interactive map of Congresshalle
- Location: Saarbrücken, Germany
- Capacity: 1300
- Type: Concert hall

Construction
- Opened: 1967
- Architect: Dieter Oesterlen

Website
- www.ccsaar.de/en/locations/congresshalle/

The Congresshalle is a concert hall located in Saarbrücken, Germany, which was designed by German architect Dieter Oesterlen. The main hall can seat 1,300 and can hold 1,800 for standing events. The Congresshalle opened in 1967 and was expanded and moved to new premises in 1995.
