= INS Investigator (J15) =

Indian hydrographic survey ship

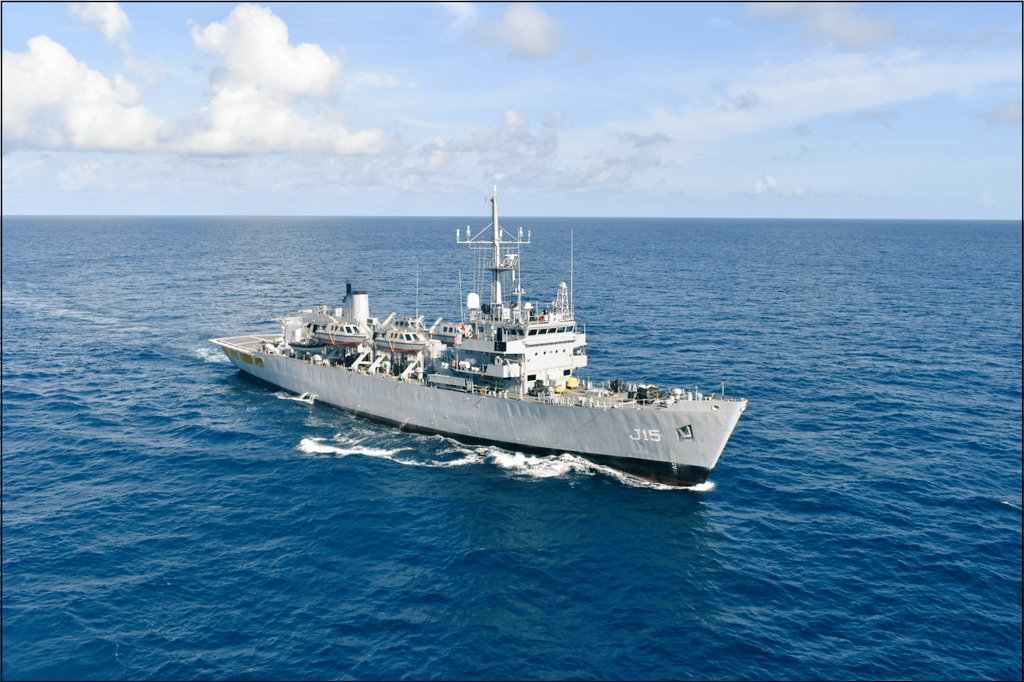
- INS Investigator at sea

History

India
- Name: INS Investigator
- Builder: Garden Reach Shipbuilders & Engineers
- Launched: 8 August 1987
- Commissioned: 1990
- Identification: IMO number: 9088964; Hull number: J15
- Status: Active

General characteristics
- Class & type: Sandhayak-class survey ship
- Type: Hydrographic survey ship
- Displacement: 1,929 long tons (1,960 t) full
- Length: 87.8 m (288 ft 1 in)
- Beam: 12.8 m (42 ft 0 in)
- Draft: 3.3 m (10 ft 10 in)
- Speed: 16 knots (30 km/h; 18 mph)
- Range: 6,000 nmi (11,000 km; 6,900 mi) at 14 knots (26 km/h; 16 mph); 14,000 nmi (26,000 km; 16,000 mi) at 10 kn (19 km/h; 12 mph)
- Complement: 18 officers + 160 enlisted
- Armament: Bofors 40 mm gun
- Aircraft carried: HAL Chetak helicopter
- Aviation facilities: Helipad

INS Investigator (J15) (Hindi: अन्वेषक) is the fourth ship in the Sandhayak class, and operates as a hydrographic survey ship in the Indian Navy's Andaman and Nicobar Naval Command. Investigator is equipped to prepare marine charts and electronic maps for the Electronic Chart Display and Information System (ECDIS). It can provide humanitarian aid and disaster-management support, and can be quickly converted into a hospital ship; the ship is equipped with an operating theater and associated equipment to deal with medical emergencies at sea.

== Description ==
Investigator, powered by two diesel engines, was built by Garden Reach Shipbuilders & Engineers and launched in 1987 by West Bengal chief minister Jyoti Basu. It was commissioned into naval service at the Mumbai naval base in 1990. One of a series of indigenously-designed and -constructed ships, Investigator is used for hydrographic surveys. In addition to surveying equipment, the ship is armed with a Bofors 40 mm gun for self defence and carries a helicopter, four survey motorboats, and two small boats.

Like its other Sadhayak-class sister ships, Investigator is equipped with a wide range of navigational and communications systems. Its modern surveying systems include a multi-beam swath echo-sounding system, differential GPS, motion sensors, a sea gravimeter, a magnetometer, oceanographic sensors, side-scan sonar equipment, an automated data-logging system, a sound-velocity profiling system, and a digital survey and processing system. This equipment allows the ship to meet the ISO 9002 digital-survey accuracy standards required for the production of electronic navigation charts and publications in accordance with the International Hydrographic Organization.

== Tasks ==
Investigator's primary tasks are hydrographic survey, nautical chart preparation, cartography and training, and it is equipped with a remotely operated underwater vehicle (ROV), an autonomous underwater vehicle (AUV) and an unmanned surface vehicle (USV). In early 2008, the ship conducted a hydrographic survey in Seychelles in cooperation with the Seychelles Coast Guard (SCG) and the Seychelles People's Defence Force (SPDF). The survey covered the entire 32-nautical-mile (59 km; 37 mi) coast, from North Point to Petite Anse, replacing navigational charts made in 1890. Investigator conducted survey work in and around western Mahe that year (to facilitate the preparation of a new navigational chart that year), In the same year, Investigator also conducted survey work in Mauritius, and surveyed 30 percent of the St. Brandon shoals (part of the Outer Islands of Mauritius) to update charts first prepared in 1851 and create a profile for a Mauritius Oceanography Institute–Commission on the Limits of the Continental Shelf survey. The survey of the Saya de Malha Bank allowed the government of Mauritius to claim an extended continental shelf beyond its exclusive economic zone. In 2013, the Investigator surveyed the seas around the Andaman and Nicobar Islands. This survey was necessitated by the 2004 Indian Ocean earthquake and tsunami, which made massive geomorphological changes to the islands and their surrounding seafloor (affecting the movement of ships and smaller watercraft).

In May 2019, it was brought under Southern Naval Command and was rebased to Kochi.

== Anti-piracy operation ==
In late 2011, Investigator was involved in an anti-piracy operation when it intercepted and disabled a pirate dhow. While traversing the Gulf of Aden, the ship received a distress call from the merchant vessel Naftocement 18. Although other ships (including INS Gomati) were on anti-piracy duty at the time, Investigator took swift action to intercept the dhow. A boarding party was launched to disable it; a search revealed that the dhow held six skiffs with outboard motors, armed with AK-47s and ammunition and supplied with food and water.
