= HMIS Investigator =

Indian Navy survey ship

History
- Name: CS Patrick Stewart
- Namesake: Patrick Stewart, the first Director-General of the Indian Telegraph Service
- Owner: (British Raj) Government of India (1925-1930)
- Operator: Indo-European Telegraph Company (1925-1930), Eastern Telegraph Company (1930-1934)
- Port of registry: (British Raj) Bombay (1925-1930), (United Kingdom) London (1930-1934)
- Builder: William Simons and Co. Ltd., Renfrew
- Yard number: 670
- Laid down: 1924
- Launched: 13 March 1925
- Completed: May 1925
- In service: 1925
- Out of service: 1934
- Identification: Official Number 5606405
- Fate: Sold to the Royal Indian Marine

India
- Name: HMIS Investigator
- Owner: (British Raj) Royal Indian Navy, (India) Indian Navy
- Acquired: 1934
- Out of service: 1951
- Renamed: INS Investigator
- Stricken: 19 June 1951
- Fate: Sold for breaking at Bombay

General characteristics
- Tonnage: 1,572 GRT
- Length: 233 ft 6 in (71.17 m)
- Beam: 37 ft 6 in (11.43 m)
- Draught: 13 ft 3 in (4.04 m) mean
- Propulsion: 2x triple expansion engines (W. Simons)
- Armament: None

HMIS Investigator (known as INS Investigator after independence) was a survey ship of the Royal Indian Navy. Launched as the cable layer Patrick Stewart in 1925, she was acquired by the RIN in 1934, serving in the surveying role until 1951, when she was sold.

== History ==
The cable ship CS Patrick Stewart was built by W. Simons of Renfrew in 1925 for the government-owned Indo-European Telegraph Company to replace an earlier ship of the same name, built in 1879. The cable laying equipment was supplied by Clarke, Chapman and Company. Patrick Stewart continued to serve with the IETC maintaining the Persian Gulf submarine cables until 1930, when the she was sold by the struggling IETC to the Eastern Telegraph Company amid serious financial problems.

After four years' service with the ETC, Patrick Stewart was sold to the Royal Indian Navy, converted to a survey ship, and renamed HMIS Investigator. Investigator served throughout the Second World War, being based at Calcutta in 1940 under the command of Martin Henry St. Leger Nott from 2 February 1940 to April of that year.

From 1941 onwards, she served as an anti-submarine patrol sloop. For this role, armament, including a 4.7 inch gun, was installed.
