= Echo =

Reflection of sound delayed after direct sound as heard by listener

In audio signal processing and acoustics, an echo is a reflection of sound that arrives at the listener with a delay after the direct sound. The delay is directly proportional to the distance of the reflecting surface from the source and the listener. Typical examples are the echo produced by the bottom of a well, a building, or the walls of enclosed and empty rooms.

== Etymology ==
The word echo derives from the Greek ἠχώ (ēchō), itself from ἦχος (ēchos), 'sound'. Echo in Greek mythology was a mountain nymph whose ability to speak was cursed, leaving her able only to repeat the last words spoken to her.

== Nature ==
Echolocation organs of a toothed whale, which produce echoes and receive sounds. Arrows illustrate the outgoing and incoming path of sound.

Some animals, such as cetaceans (dolphins and whales) and bats, use echo for location sensing and navigation, a process known as echolocation. Echoes are also the basis of sonar technology.

== Acoustic phenomenon ==
Walls or other hard surfaces, such as mountains and privacy fences, reflect acoustic waves. The reason for reflection may be explained as a discontinuity in the propagation medium. This can be heard when the reflection returns with sufficient magnitude and delay to be perceived distinctly. When sound, or the echo itself, is reflected multiple times from multiple surfaces, it is characterized as a reverberation.

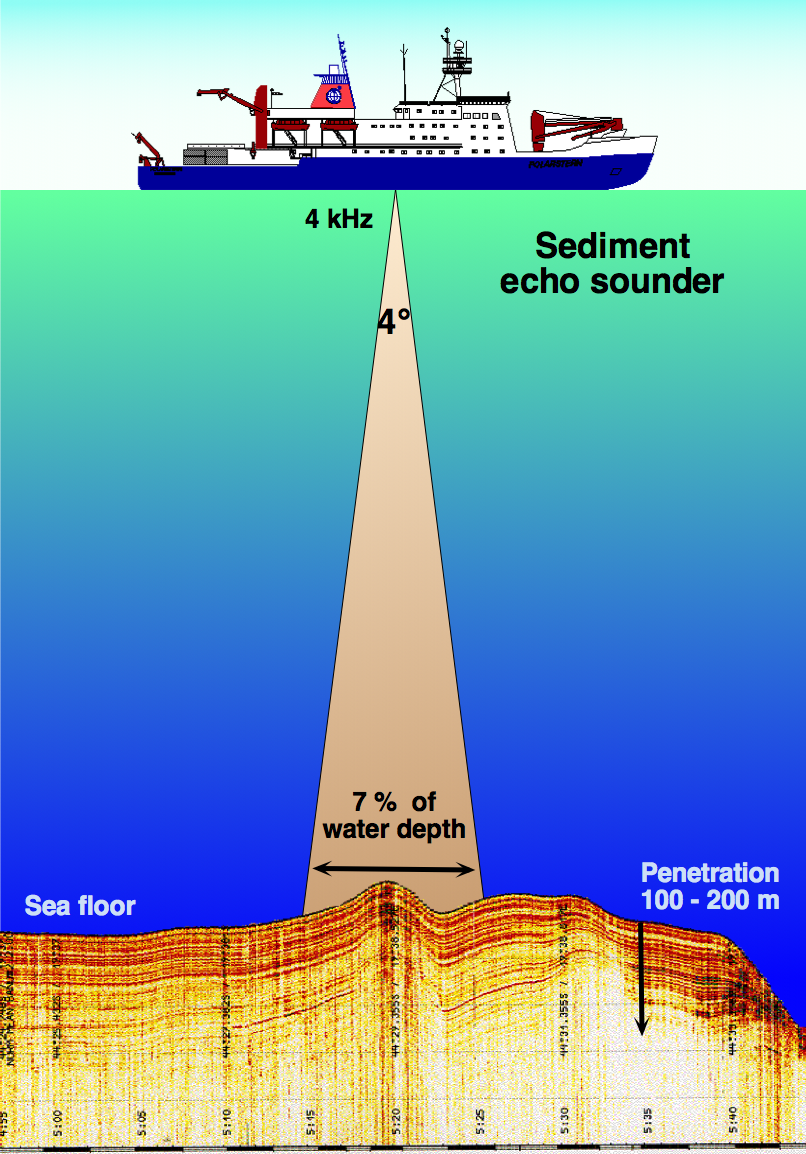
This illustration depicts the principle of sediment echo sounding, which uses a narrow beam of high energy and low frequency

The human ear cannot distinguish echo from the original direct sound if the delay is less than 1/10 a second. The speed of sound in dry air is approximately 341 m/s at a temperature of 25 °C. Therefore, the reflecting object must be more than 17.2m from the sound source for the echo to be perceived by a person at the source. When a sound produces an echo in two seconds, the reflecting object is 343m away. In nature, canyon walls or rock cliffs facing water are the most common natural settings for hearing echoes. The echo strength is frequently measured in sound pressure level (SPL) relative to the directly transmitted wave. Echoes may be desirable (as in systems).

== Use of echo ==
In sonar, ultrasonic waves are more energetic than audible sounds. They can travel undeviated through a long distance, confined to a narrow beam, and are not easily absorbed in the medium. Hence, sound ranging and echo depth sounding uses ultrasonic waves. Ultrasonic waves are sent in all directions from the ship and are received at the receiver after the reflection from an obstacle (enemy ship, iceberg, or sunken ship). The distance from the obstacle is found using the formula d = (V*t)/2. Echo depth sounding is the process of finding the depth of the sea using this process. In the medical field, ultrasonic waves of sound are used in ultrasonography and echo cardiography.

== Echo in music ==
Electric echo effects have been used since the 1950s in music performance and recording. The Echoplex is a tape delay effect, first made in 1959, that recreates the sound of an acoustic echo. Designed by Mike Battle, the Echoplex set a standard for the effect in the 1960s and was used by most of the notable guitar players of the era; original Echoplexes are highly sought after. While Echoplexes were used heavily by guitar players (and the occasional bass player, such as Chuck Rainey, or trumpeter, such as Don Ellis), many recording studios also used the Echoplex. Beginning in the 1970s, Market built the solid-state Echoplex for Maestro. In the 2000s, most echo effects units used electronic or digital circuitry to recreate the echo effect.

== See also ==
- Light echo
