= List of Indian Naval deployments =

The list of deployments of the Indian Navy from 2013.

== Background ==
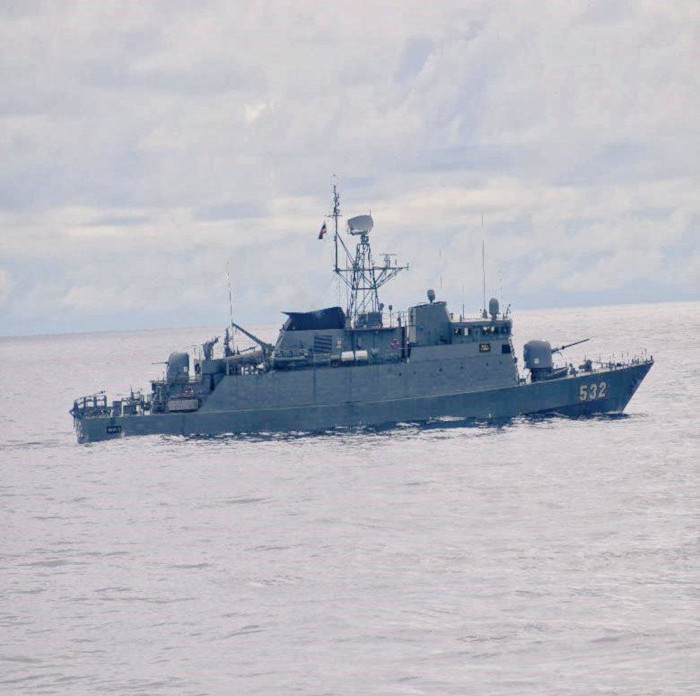
HTMS Tayanchon during 32nd Indo-Thai Coordinated Patrol, 2021.

In the 1970s and 1980s, Indian Navy's deployments outside the Indian Ocean were largely limited to delivery of new vessels. Over years, the Indian leadership looked at the Navy as an effective tool for foreign policy and this was reflected in the pattern of Indian navy deployments. The Indian Navy hosted its first International Fleet Review in February 2001. This event was termed "Bridges of Friendship" and was attended by 24 warships form 19 countries. An office dedicated to international co-operation was created in 2005. This term has been used by the Navy since then to undertake humanitarian and security missions by engaging with nations primarily in the Indian Ocean littoral region and South-east Asia. These engagements include mutual port visits, international forums and joint naval exercises.

In late 2017, the Indian Navy adopted a new plan for deployment of warships which was aimed to counter the increasing presence of Chinese presence in the Indian Ocean. Under the new plan, 14–15 mission ready warships are deployed across multiple regions including the Malacca Strait and Andaman Sea; North Andaman Sea and Bay of Bengal (Bangladesh and Myanmar), Lakshadweep islands and Maldives; Madagascar; the Persian Gulf and the Arabian Sea.

== Summary of naval deployments ==
| Year | List of countries visited | Number of countries visited |
|---|---|---|
| 2013 | Sri Lanka, Singapore, Malaysia, Vietnam, Philippines, Kuwait, Qatar, UAE, Oman | 9 |
| 2014 | Indonesia, China, United States, Australia, Philippines, Russia, Japan, Maldives, Kenya, South Africa, France, Mauritius, Seychelles, Mozambique, Madagascar | 15 |
| 2015 | Sri Lanka, Spain, Indonesia, Egypt, France, United Kingdom, United States, Malaysia, Singapore, Australia, Cambodia, Thailand, Seychelles, Iran, UAE, Bahrain, Saudi Arabia, Kuwait, Qatar, Oman, South Korea, Vietnam, Djibouti, Malta, Philippines, Israel, Turkey, Germany, Denmark, Norway, Portugal | 31 |
| 2016 | Bangladesh, Brunei, Fiji, Indonesia, Kuwait, Kenya, Malaysia, Maldives, Marshall Islands, Mozambique, New Zealand, South Africa, Russia, South Korea, Japan, Mauritius, Madagascar, Micronesia, Qatar, Sri Lanka, Seychelles, Singapore, Thailand, Tanzania, Oman, Philippines, UAE, United States, Vietnam | 29 |
| 2017 | UAE, Sri Lanka, Myanmar, Mauritius, Seychelles, Greece, France, United Kingdom, Egypt, Indonesia, Israel, Singapore, Malaysia, Portugal, Saudi Arabia, Morocco, Bangladesh, Nigeria, Angola, Papua New Guinea, Australia, Namibia, South Africa, China, Oman, Vietnam, Philippines, Japan, Maldives, Russia, Tanzania. Thailand, Cambodia, Brunei, New Zealand, Spain | 36 |
| 2018 | Falkland Islands (UK) and United Kingdom, Thailand, Seychelles, South Africa, Mauritius, Qatar, UAE, Tanzania, Oman, Saudi Arabia, Singapore, Reunion Islands (France) and France, Maldives, Comoros, Malaysia, Madagascar, Vietnam, Malta, Portugal, Yemen, Indonesia, United States, Bangladesh, Sri Lanka, Djibouti, Iran, Norway, Fiji, Myanmar, Australia, Kenya, South Korea, Denmark, Netherlands | 34 |
| 2024 | Singapore, Malaysia, Vietnam, Philippines, Brunei, Japan, USA, Seychelles, Mauritius, Bangladesh, Egypt, Germany, Russia, United Kingdom, Sweden, Denmark, Spain, France, Sri Lanka, Iran, Kenya, Australia, Oman and Morocco | 24 |
| 2025 | Senegal, Nigeria, South Africa, Seychelles, Indonesia, Mauritius, Malaysia, Singapore, Vietnam, Philippines, Sri Lanka, Morocco, Italy, Papua New Guinea, Egypt, Saudi Arabia, Greece, Fiji, Mozambique, Cyprus, Kenya, Italy, South Korea, Japan and United States | 24 |
| 2026 | Antigua, Australia, Bahrain, Cambodia, Cape Verde, Egypt, France, Indonesia, Italy, Japan, Kenya, Malaysia, Maldives, Malta, Mauritius, Morocco, Mozambique, Oman, Philippines, Portugal, Russia, Seychelles, Singapore, South Africa, South Korea, Spain, Sri Lanka, Tanzania, Thailand, United Kingdom, United States, and Vietnam. | 32 |

== List of deployments (2013–15) ==
The following is a list of naval deployments, Coordinated Patrols (CORPATs) and naval exercises of the Indian Navy.

| Fleet | Deployment | Ships | Date | Port Visited | Notes and References |
|---|---|---|---|---|---|
2013
| | India-Myanmar CORPAT 2013 | | 9 – 13 March | Visakhapatnam, India | |
| | Indo-Thai CORPAT 2013 | | April | | |
| Southern Naval Command | Visit to Sri Lanka – Captain Vinay Kumar Sawhney: INS Sujata – Commander Dalip Singh; INS Tarangini – Commander T Sugreev; ICGS Varuna – Commander KM Arun Kumar | INS Sujata INS Tarangini ICGS Varuna | 17 – 21 April | Colombo, Sri Lanka | |
| | India-Indonesia CORPAT 2013 | | May | | |
| Eastern Naval Command | South China Sea and Western Pacific – Rear Admiral P. Ajit Kumar: INS Ranvijay; INS Satpura; INS Kirch; INS Shakti | INS Satpura INS Kirch | 16 – 23 May | Singapore | IMDEX and SIMBEX 2013 |
| Eastern Naval Command | South China Sea and Western Pacific – Rear Admiral P. Ajit Kumar: INS Ranvijay; INS Satpura; INS Kirch; INS Shakti | INS Ranvijay INS Satpura INS Kirch INS Shakti | 26 -31 May | Port Klang, Malaysia | |
| Eastern Naval Command | South China Sea and Western Pacific – Rear Admiral P. Ajit Kumar: INS Ranvijay; INS Satpura; INS Kirch; INS Shakti | INS Ranvijay INS Satpura INS Kirch INS Shakti | 5 – 8 June | Danang, Vietnam | |
| Eastern Naval Command | South China Sea and Western Pacific – Rear Admiral P. Ajit Kumar: INS Ranvijay; INS Satpura; INS Kirch; INS Shakti | INS Ranvijay INS Satpura INS Kirch INS Shakti | 12 – 15 June | Manila, Philippines | |
| Western Naval Command | Persian Gulf – Rear Admiral Anil Kumar Chawla: INS Mysore; INS Tarkash; INS Tabar- Captain S. Venkat Raman; INS Aditya | INS Mysore INS Tarkash | 9 – 12 September | Kuwait City, Kuwait | |
| Western Naval Command | Persian Gulf – Rear Admiral Anil Kumar Chawla: INS Mysore; INS Tarkash; INS Tabar- Captain S. Venkat Raman; INS Aditya | INS Tabar INS Aditya | 10 – 13 September | Doha, Qatar | |
| Western Naval Command | Persian Gulf – Rear Admiral Anil Kumar Chawla: INS Mysore; INS Tarkash; INS Tabar- Captain S. Venkat Raman; INS Aditya | INS Mysore INS Tarkash INS Tabar INS Aditya | 15 – 18 September | Dubai, United Arab Emirates | |
| Western Naval Command | Persian Gulf – Rear Admiral Anil Kumar Chawla: INS Mysore; INS Tarkash; INS Tabar- Captain S. Venkat Raman; INS Aditya | INS Mysore INS Tarkash INS Tabar INS Aditya | 19 – 26 September | Muscat, Oman | Naseem Al Bahar IX |
| | India-Indonesia CORPAT 2013 | | September | | |
| Western Naval Command | Konkan 2013: INS Delhi – Captain Sandeep Mehta | INS Delhi | 14 – 19 October | Goa, India | |
| | Indo-Thai CORPAT 2013 | | November | | |
| Eastern Naval Command | Malabar 2013: INS Ranvijay; INS Shivalik | INS Ranvijay INS Shivalik | 5 – 11 November | Chennai, India | |
| | SLINEX 2013 | | November | | |
| Eastern Naval Command | JIMEX 2013: INS Ranvijay; INS Satpura; INS Kuthar | INS Ranvijay INS Satpura INS Kuthar | 19 – 22 December | Bay of Bengal | |
2014
| Andaman & Nicobar Command | MILAN 2014: INS Saryu; INS Kesari; INS Investigator; INS Batti Malv; INS Baratang; INS Bangaram | INS Saryu INS Kesari INS Investigator INS Batti Malv INS Baratang INS Bangaram | 4 – 9 February | Port Blair, India | |
| | MH-370 Search: INS Satpura; INS Sahyadri; INS Saryu; INS Kesari; INS Kumbhir; INS Batti Malv | INS Satpura INS Sahyadri | 13 – 20 March | Bay of Bengal | |
| | MH-370 Search: INS Satpura; INS Sahyadri; INS Saryu; INS Kesari; INS Kumbhir; INS Batti Malv | INS Saryu INS Kesari INS Kumbhir INS Batti Malv | 13 – 20 March | Andaman Sea | |
| Andaman & Nicobar Command | Exercise KOMODO 2014: INS Sukanya | INS Sukanya | 28 March – 3 April | Batam, Indonesia | |
| | International Fleet Review: INS Shivalik | INS Shivalik | 20 – 25 April | Qingdao, China | |
| Eastern Naval Command | SIMBEX 2014: INS Karmuk; INS Kuthar | INS Karmuk INS Kuthar | 22 – 28 May | Port Blair, India | |
| Eastern Naval Command | Western Pacific: INS Sahyadri'- Captain Jyotin Raina | INS Sahyadri | 10 – 13 June | Darwin, Australia | |
| Eastern Naval Command | Western Pacific: INS Sahyadri'- Captain Jyotin Raina | INS Sahyadri | 1 July – 2 August | Hawaii, United States | RIMPAC 2014 |
| Eastern Naval Command | Western Pacific: INS Sahyadri'- Captain Jyotin Raina | INS Sahyadri | 20 – 24 August | Manila, Philippines | |
| Eastern Naval Command | Western Pacific- Rear Admiral Atul Kumar Jain: INS Ranvijay; INS Shivalik; INS Shakti | INS Ranvijay INS Shivalik INS Shakti | 14 – 19 July | Vladivostok, Russia | Indra 2014 |
| Eastern Naval Command | Western Pacific- Rear Admiral Atul Kumar Jain: INS Ranvijay; INS Shivalik; INS Shakti | INS Ranvijay INS Shivalik INS Shakti | 23 – 30 July | Sasebo, Japan | Malabar 2014 |
| Southern Naval Command | Persian Gulf – Vice Admiral Surinder Pal Singh Cheema: INS Tir; INS Sujata; INS Tarangini | INS Tir INS Sujata INS Tarangini | 12 – October | Port Sultan Qaboos, Oman | |
| Western Naval Command | East Africa and South Indian Ocean – Rear Admiral R. Hari Kumar: INS Mumbai; INS Talwar; INS Teg; INS Deepak | INS Mumbai INS Talwar INS Teg INS Deepak | 9 – 12 October | Antsiranana, Madagascar | |
| Western Naval Command | East Africa and South Indian Ocean – Rear Admiral R. Hari Kumar: INS Mumbai; INS Talwar; INS Teg; INS Deepak | INS Mumbai INS Talwar INS Deepak | 15 October | Mombasa, Kenya | |
| Western Naval Command | East Africa and South Indian Ocean – Rear Admiral R. Hari Kumar: INS Mumbai; INS Talwar; INS Teg; INS Deepak | INS Teg | 20 October – 10 November | Simon's Town, South Africa | IBSAMAR 2014 |
| Western Naval Command | East Africa and South Indian Ocean – Rear Admiral R. Hari Kumar: INS Mumbai; INS Talwar; INS Teg; INS Deepak | INS Mumbai INS Talwar INS Deepak | 27 October | Saint-Denis, Reunion | |
| Western Naval Command | East Africa and South Indian Ocean – Rear Admiral R. Hari Kumar: INS Mumbai; INS Talwar; INS Teg; INS Deepak | INS Mumbai INS Talwar INS Deepak | 31 October | Port Louis, Mauritius | |
| Western Naval Command | East Africa and South Indian Ocean – Rear Admiral R. Hari Kumar: INS Mumbai; INS Talwar; INS Teg; INS Deepak | INS Mumbai INS Talwar INS Deepak | 6 – 9 November | Port Victoria, Seychelles | |
| Western Naval Command | East Africa and South Indian Ocean – Rear Admiral R. Hari Kumar: INS Mumbai; INS Talwar; INS Teg; INS Deepak | INS Teg | 17 November | Nacala, Mozambique | |
| | Maldives Water Crisis: INS Deepak; INS Sukanya | INS Deepak INS Sukanya (Commander M. Dorai Babu) | 5 – 12 December | Male, Maldives | |
2015
| Southern Naval Command | Lokayan 2015: INS Tarangini – Commander Gaurav Gautam | INS Tarangini | 27 April | Kochi, India | |
| Southern Naval Command | Lokayan 2015: INS Tarangini – Commander Gaurav Gautam | INS Tarangini | 14 – 17 May | Salalah, Oman | |
| Southern Naval Command | Lokayan 2015: INS Tarangini – Commander Gaurav Gautam | INS Tarangini | 2 – 4 June | Jeddah, Saudi Arabia | |
| Southern Naval Command | Lokayan 2015: INS Tarangini – Commander Gaurav Gautam | INS Tarangini | 10 – 12 June | Alexandria, Egypt | |
| Southern Naval Command | Lokayan 2015: INS Tarangini – Commander Gaurav Gautam | INS Tarangini | 21 June | Valletta, Malta | |
| Southern Naval Command | Lokayan 2015: INS Tarangini – Commander Gaurav Gautam | INS Tarangini | | Cadiz, Spain | |
| Southern Naval Command | Lokayan 2015: INS Tarangini – Commander Gaurav Gautam | INS Tarangini | | Plymouth, United Kingdom | |
| Southern Naval Command | Lokayan 2015: INS Tarangini – Commander Gaurav Gautam | INS Tarangini | | Kristiansand, Norway | |
| Southern Naval Command | Lokayan 2015: INS Tarangini – Commander Gaurav Gautam | INS Tarangini | | Aalborg, Denmark | |
| Southern Naval Command | Lokayan 2015: INS Tarangini – Commander Gaurav Gautam | INS Tarangini | | Rostock, Germany | |
| Southern Naval Command | Lokayan 2015: INS Tarangini – Commander Gaurav Gautam | INS Tarangini | | Bremerhaven, Germany | |
| Southern Naval Command | Lokayan 2015: INS Tarangini – Commander Gaurav Gautam | INS Tarangini | | Amsterdam, Netherlands | |
| Southern Naval Command | Lokayan 2015: INS Tarangini – Commander Gaurav Gautam | INS Tarangini | | Le Havre, France | |
| Southern Naval Command | Lokayan 2015: INS Tarangini – Commander Gaurav Gautam | INS Tarangini | | Lisbon, Portugal | |
| Southern Naval Command | Lokayan 2015: INS Tarangini – Commander Gaurav Gautam | INS Tarangini | | Valletta, Malta | |
| Southern Naval Command | Lokayan 2015: INS Tarangini – Commander Gaurav Gautam | INS Tarangini | | Port Said, Egypt | |
| Southern Naval Command | Lokayan 2015: INS Tarangini – Commander Gaurav Gautam | INS Tarangini | | Djibouti | |
| Southern Naval Command | Lokayan 2015: INS Tarangini – Commander Gaurav Gautam | INS Tarangini | 22 -24 November | Port Sultan Qaboos, Oman | |
| Southern Naval Command | Lokayan 2015: INS Tarangini – Commander Gaurav Gautam | INS Tarangini | 4 December | Kochi, India | |
| Andaman & Nicobar Command | ARF-DiREx 2015: INS Saryu – Commander Sreekumar Pillai | INS Saryu | 24 – 28 May | Penang, Malaysia | |
| Eastern Naval Command | South Indian Ocean and South China Sea – Rear Admiral Ajendra Bahadur Singh: INS Ranvir – Captain Jaswinder Singh; INS Satpura – Captain Hari Krishnan; INS Kamorta – Commander Manoj Kumar Jha; INS Shakti | INS Satpura INS Kamorta | 18 – 26 May | Singapore | IMDEX and SIMBEX-15 |
| Eastern Naval Command | South Indian Ocean and South China Sea – Rear Admiral Ajendra Bahadur Singh: INS Ranvir – Captain Jaswinder Singh; INS Satpura – Captain Hari Krishnan; INS Kamorta – Commander Manoj Kumar Jha; INS Shakti | INS Ranvir INS Shakti | 22 – 26 May | Singapore | |
| Eastern Naval Command | South Indian Ocean and South China Sea – Rear Admiral Ajendra Bahadur Singh: INS Ranvir – Captain Jaswinder Singh; INS Satpura – Captain Hari Krishnan; INS Kamorta – Commander Manoj Kumar Jha; INS Shakti | INS Ranvir INS Shakti | 31 May – 4 June | Jakarta, Indonesia | |
| Eastern Naval Command | South Indian Ocean and South China Sea – Rear Admiral Ajendra Bahadur Singh: INS Ranvir – Captain Jaswinder Singh; INS Satpura – Captain Hari Krishnan; INS Kamorta – Commander Manoj Kumar Jha; INS Shakti | INS Ranvir INS Satpura INS Kamorta INS Shakti | 17 – 21 June | Kuantan, Malaysia | |
| Eastern Naval Command | South Indian Ocean and South China Sea – Rear Admiral Ajendra Bahadur Singh: INS Ranvir – Captain Jaswinder Singh; INS Satpura – Captain Hari Krishnan; INS Kamorta – Commander Manoj Kumar Jha; INS Shakti | INS Satpura INS Kamorta | 4 – 6 June | Fremantle, Australia | |
| Eastern Naval Command | South Indian Ocean and South China Sea – Rear Admiral Ajendra Bahadur Singh: INS Ranvir – Captain Jaswinder Singh; INS Satpura – Captain Hari Krishnan; INS Kamorta – Commander Manoj Kumar Jha; INS Shakti | INS Ranvir INS Kamorta | 23 – 26 June | Sihanoukville, Cambodia | |
| Eastern Naval Command | South Indian Ocean and South China Sea – Rear Admiral Ajendra Bahadur Singh: INS Ranvir – Captain Jaswinder Singh; INS Satpura – Captain Hari Krishnan; INS Kamorta – Commander Manoj Kumar Jha; INS Shakti | INS Satpura INS Shakti | 28 – 30 June | Sattahip, Thailand | |
| Western Naval Command | Seychelles' National Day celebrations: INS Teg – Captain AY Sardesai | INS Teg | 26 June – 9 July | Port Victoria, Seychelles | |
| Western Naval Command | Visit to Iran: INS Betwa – Captain KM Ramakrishnan; INS Beas – Captain Deepak Bhatia | INS Betwa INS Beas | 28 July – 1 August | Bandar Abbas, Iran | |
| Eastern Naval Command | AUSINDEX 2015 – Rear Admiral Ajendra Bahadur Singh: INS Ranvijay; INS Shivalik; INS Shakti | INS Ranvijay INS Shivalik INS Shakti | 11 – 16 September | Visakhapatnam, India | |
| Western Naval Command | Persian Gulf: INS Delhi; INS Tabar; INS Trishul; INS Deepak | INS Delhi INS Tabar INS Trishul INS Deepak | 5 – 8 September | Dubai, United Arab Emirates | |
| Western Naval Command | Persian Gulf: INS Delhi; INS Tabar; INS Trishul; INS Deepak | INS Tabar INS Deepak | 9 – 12 September | Manama, Bahrain | |
| Western Naval Command | Persian Gulf: INS Delhi; INS Tabar; INS Trishul; INS Deepak | INS Delhi INS Trishul | 10 – 13 September | Jubail, Saudi Arabia | |
| Western Naval Command | Persian Gulf: INS Delhi; INS Tabar; INS Trishul; INS Deepak | INS Tabar INS Deepak | 13 – 16 September | Kuwait City, Kuwait | |
| Western Naval Command | Persian Gulf: INS Delhi; INS Tabar; INS Trishul; INS Deepak | INS Delhi INS Trishul | 14 – 17 September | Doha, Qatar | |
| Western Naval Command | Persian Gulf: INS Delhi; INS Tabar; INS Trishul; INS Deepak | INS Delhi INS Tabar INS Trishul INS Deepak | 19 – 22 September | Muscat, Oman | |
| Eastern Naval Command | North West Pacific region and South China Sea: INS Sahyadri – Captain Kunal Singh Rajkumar | INS Sahyadri | 2 – 5 October | Danang, Vietnam | |
| Eastern Naval Command | North West Pacific region and South China Sea: INS Sahyadri – Captain Kunal Singh Rajkumar | INS Sahyadri | 23 – 37 October | Incheon, South Korea | |
| Eastern Naval Command | North West Pacific region and South China Sea: INS Sahyadri – Captain Kunal Singh Rajkumar | INS Sahyadri | 2 – 4 November | Manila, Philippines | |
| Western Naval Command | West Asia, Africa and Europe: INS Trikand – Captain Vinay Kalia | INS Trikand | 10 – 13 August | Djibouti, Djibouti | |
| Western Naval Command | West Asia, Africa and Europe: INS Trikand – Captain Vinay Kalia | INS Trikand | 19 – 23 August | Haifa, Israel | |
| Western Naval Command | West Asia, Africa and Europe: INS Trikand – Captain Vinay Kalia | INS Trikand | 5 – 11 September | Devonport, United Kingdom | Konkan 2015 |
| Western Naval Command | West Asia, Africa and Europe: INS Trikand – Captain Vinay Kalia | INS Trikand | 26 – 28 September | Toulon, France | |
| Western Naval Command | West Asia, Africa and Europe: INS Trikand – Captain Vinay Kalia | INS Trikand | 4 – 6 October | Istanbul, Turkey | |
| Western Naval Command | West Asia, Africa and Europe: INS Trikand – Captain Vinay Kalia | INS Trikand | 11 – 13 October | Safaga, Egypt | |
| Andaman & Nicobar Command | India-Indonesian CORPAT-2015 26th Edition: INS Saryu | INS Saryu | 1 – 21 October | Port Belawan, Indonesia | |
| | SLINEX-2015 4th Edition: INS Kora – Commander Ashok Rao; INS Kirpan – Commander Abraham Samuel; INS Savitri – Commander Prashant Negi | INS Kora INS Kirpan INS Savitri | 27 October – 1 November | Trincomalee, Sri Lanka | |
| | Hydro-graphic survey: INS Darshak | INS Darshak | 8 November – 8 December | Port Victoria, Seychelles | |

== List of deployments (2016–20) ==
| Fleet | Deployment | Ships | Date | Port Visited | Notes and References |
|---|---|---|---|---|---|
2016
| Western Naval Command | Exercise Naseem Al Bahr X: INS Trikand; INS Trishul | INS Trikand INS Trishul | 22 – 27 January | Goa, India | |
| Western Naval Command | Visit to Sri Lanka – Rear Admiral Ravneet Singh: INS Vikramaditya – Captain Krishna Swaminathan; INS Mysore – Captain M Paul Samuel; INS Deepak – Captain Sujit Kumar Chhetri | INS Vikramaditya INS Mysore INS Deepak | 21 – 23 January | Colombo, Sri Lanka | |
| Western Naval Command | Visit to Sri Lanka – Rear Admiral Ravneet Singh: INS Vikramaditya – Captain Krishna Swaminathan; INS Mysore – Captain M Paul Samuel; INS Deepak – Captain Sujit Kumar Chhetri | INS Vikramaditya INS Mysore INS Deepak | 15 – 18 February | Male, Maldives | |
| Southern Naval Command | Indo-Myanmar CORPAT 2016: INS Saryu – Commander Sreekumar Pillai; INS Bitra | INS Saryu INS Bitra | 17 – 19 February | Yangon, Myanmar | |
| Western Naval Command | IBSAMAR V: INS Mumbai; INS Trishul; INS Shalki | INS Mumbai INS Trishul INS Shalki | 19 – 26 February | Goa, India | |
| Western Naval Command | Mauritius National Day celebrations: INS Tabar – Captain Ashutosh Ridhorkar | INS Tabar | 10–12 March | Port Louis, Mauritius | |
| Eastern Naval Command & Andaman & Nicobar Command | Exercise Jal Prahar 2016: INS Jalashwa; INS Airavat; INS Kumbhir; INS Guldar; LCU 36, 38 & 39 | INS Jalashwa INS Airavat INS Kumbhir INS Guldar LCU 36, 38 & 39 | 27 March – 18 April 2016 | Andaman & Nicobar Islands, India | |
| Western Naval Command | DIMDEX 2016: INS Beas – Captain Deepak Bhatia | INS Beas | 28 March – 2 April | Doha, Qatar | |
| Southern Naval Command | South East Asia – Vice Admiral Girish Luthra: INS Tir – Captain S.R. Ayyar; INS Sujata; INS Sudarshini; ICGS Varuna | INS Tir INS Sujata INS Sudarshini ICGS Varuna | 4 – 8 April | Phuket, Thailand | |
| Southern Naval Command | South East Asia – Vice Admiral Girish Luthra: INS Tir – Captain S.R. Ayyar; INS Sujata; INS Sudarshini; ICGS Varuna | INS Tir INS Sujata ICGS Varuna | 15 – 18 April | Colombo, Sri Lanka | |
| Andaman & Nicobar Command | Indo-Thai CORPAT-2016 22nd Edition: INS Karmuk – Commodore Girish Kumar Garg | INS Karmuk | 19 – 27 April | Andaman Sea | |
| Andaman & Nicobar Command | India-Indonesian CORPAT-2016 27th Edition: INS Karmuk – Commodore Girish Kumar Garg | INS Karmuk | 29 April – 16 May | Port Belawan, Indonesia | |
| | ASEAN ADMM Plus: INS Airavat – Commander Jayant Mahadik | INS Airavat | 1 – 9 May | Brunei | |
| Western Naval Command | Anti-piracy patrol in Gulf of Aden: INS Sharda | INS Sharda | 2 May | Duqm, Oman | |
| Western Naval Command | Persian Gulf – Rear Admiral Ravneet Singh: INS Delhi – Captain Sandeep Singh Sandhu; INS Tarkash – Captain Pradeep Singh; INS Deepak – Captain Sujit Kumar Chhetri | INS Delhi INS Tarkash INS Deepak | 12–15 May | Kuwait City, Kuwait | |
| Western Naval Command | Persian Gulf – Rear Admiral Ravneet Singh: INS Delhi – Captain Sandeep Singh Sandhu; INS Tarkash – Captain Pradeep Singh; INS Deepak – Captain Sujit Kumar Chhetri | INS Delhi INS Tarkash INS Deepak | 18–19 May | Dubai, United Arab Emirates | |
| Western Naval Command | Persian Gulf – Rear Admiral Ravneet Singh: INS Delhi – Captain Sandeep Singh Sandhu; INS Tarkash – Captain Pradeep Singh; INS Deepak – Captain Sujit Kumar Chhetri | INS Delhi INS Tarkash INS Deepak | 21–24 May | Muscat, Oman | |
| Eastern Naval Command | South China Sea and the Western Pacific Ocean – Rear Admiral S. V. Bhokare: INS Satpura – Captain A. N. Pramod; INS Sahyadri – Captain K S Rajkumar; INS Kirch – Commander Sharad Sinsunwal; INS Shakti – Captain Gagan Kaushal | INS Sahyadri INS Shakti | 30 May – 2 June | Subic Bay, Philippines | |
| Eastern Naval Command | South China Sea and the Western Pacific Ocean – Rear Admiral S. V. Bhokare: INS Satpura – Captain A. N. Pramod; INS Sahyadri – Captain K S Rajkumar; INS Kirch – Commander Sharad Sinsunwal; INS Shakti – Captain Gagan Kaushal | INS Satpura INS Kirch | 30 May – 3 June | Cam Ranh Bay, Vietnam | |
| Eastern Naval Command | South China Sea and the Western Pacific Ocean – Rear Admiral S. V. Bhokare: INS Satpura – Captain A. N. Pramod; INS Sahyadri – Captain K S Rajkumar; INS Kirch – Commander Sharad Sinsunwal; INS Shakti – Captain Gagan Kaushal | INS Sahyadri INS Kirch INS Shakti | 14–17 June | Sasebo, Japan | Malabar 2016 |
| Eastern Naval Command | South China Sea and the Western Pacific Ocean – Rear Admiral S. V. Bhokare: INS Satpura – Captain A. N. Pramod; INS Sahyadri – Captain K S Rajkumar; INS Kirch – Commander Sharad Sinsunwal; INS Shakti – Captain Gagan Kaushal | INS Sahyadri INS Kirch INS Shakti | 21–25 June | Busan, South Korea | |
| Eastern Naval Command | South China Sea and the Western Pacific Ocean – Rear Admiral S. V. Bhokare: INS Satpura – Captain A. N. Pramod; INS Sahyadri – Captain K S Rajkumar; INS Kirch – Commander Sharad Sinsunwal; INS Shakti – Captain Gagan Kaushal | INS Sahyadri INS Kirch INS Shakti | 27 June – 1 July | Vladivostok, Russia | |
| Eastern Naval Command | South China Sea and the Western Pacific Ocean – Rear Admiral S. V. Bhokare: INS Satpura – Captain A. N. Pramod; INS Sahyadri – Captain K S Rajkumar; INS Kirch – Commander Sharad Sinsunwal; INS Shakti – Captain Gagan Kaushal | INS Satpura | 30 June – 4 August | Hawaii, United States | 25th edition of the RIMPAC Exercise |
| Eastern Naval Command | South China Sea and the Western Pacific Ocean – Rear Admiral S. V. Bhokare: INS Satpura – Captain A. N. Pramod; INS Sahyadri – Captain K S Rajkumar; INS Kirch – Commander Sharad Sinsunwal; INS Shakti – Captain Gagan Kaushal | INS Sahyadri INS Kirch INS Shakti | 15 – 18 July | Port Klang, Malaysia | |
| Eastern Naval Command | South China Sea and the Western Pacific Ocean – Rear Admiral S. V. Bhokare: INS Satpura – Captain A. N. Pramod; INS Sahyadri – Captain K S Rajkumar; INS Kirch – Commander Sharad Sinsunwal; INS Shakti – Captain Gagan Kaushal | INS Satpura | 13 – 15 August | Port Majuro, Marshall Islands | |
| Eastern Naval Command | South China Sea and the Western Pacific Ocean – Rear Admiral S. V. Bhokare: INS Satpura – Captain A. N. Pramod; INS Sahyadri – Captain K S Rajkumar; INS Kirch – Commander Sharad Sinsunwal; INS Shakti – Captain Gagan Kaushal | INS Satpura | 18 – 20 August | Pohnpei, Micronesia | |
| Eastern Naval Command | South China Sea and the Western Pacific Ocean – Rear Admiral S. V. Bhokare: INS Satpura – Captain A. N. Pramod; INS Sahyadri – Captain K S Rajkumar; INS Kirch – Commander Sharad Sinsunwal; INS Shakti – Captain Gagan Kaushal | INS Satpura | 31 August – 3 September | Singapore | |
| Western Naval Command | East Africa and the Southern Indian Ocean – Rear Admiral Ravneet Singh: INS Kolkata – Captain Rahul Vilas Gokhale; INS Trikand – Captain Arjun Dev Nair; INS Aditya – Captain Vidyanshu Srivastava | INS Kolkata INS Aditya | 28 – 30 August | Port Victoria, Seychelles | Enhance defence ties with the Seychelles People Defense Forces |
| Western Naval Command | East Africa and the Southern Indian Ocean – Rear Admiral Ravneet Singh: INS Kolkata – Captain Rahul Vilas Gokhale; INS Trikand – Captain Arjun Dev Nair; INS Aditya – Captain Vidyanshu Srivastava | INS Trikand | 31 August-3 September | Antsirananna, Madagascar | Relief material for people affected by bush fires. |
| Western Naval Command | East Africa and the Southern Indian Ocean – Rear Admiral Ravneet Singh: INS Kolkata – Captain Rahul Vilas Gokhale; INS Trikand – Captain Arjun Dev Nair; INS Aditya – Captain Vidyanshu Srivastava | INS Kolkata INS Aditya | 1 – 4 September | Port Louis, Mauritius | |
| Western Naval Command | East Africa and the Southern Indian Ocean – Rear Admiral Ravneet Singh: INS Kolkata – Captain Rahul Vilas Gokhale; INS Trikand – Captain Arjun Dev Nair; INS Aditya – Captain Vidyanshu Srivastava | INS Trikand | 6 – 9 September | Dar es Salaam, Tanzania | |
| Western Naval Command | East Africa and the Southern Indian Ocean – Rear Admiral Ravneet Singh: INS Kolkata – Captain Rahul Vilas Gokhale; INS Trikand – Captain Arjun Dev Nair; INS Aditya – Captain Vidyanshu Srivastava | INS Kolkata INS Aditya | 10 – 13 September | Mombasa, Kenya | |
| Western Naval Command | East Africa and the Southern Indian Ocean – Rear Admiral Ravneet Singh: INS Kolkata – Captain Rahul Vilas Gokhale; INS Trikand – Captain Arjun Dev Nair; INS Aditya – Captain Vidyanshu Srivastava | INS Trikand | 17 – 20 September | Maputo, Mozambique | |
| Western Naval Command | East Africa and the Southern Indian Ocean – Rear Admiral Ravneet Singh: INS Kolkata – Captain Rahul Vilas Gokhale; INS Trikand – Captain Arjun Dev Nair; INS Aditya – Captain Vidyanshu Srivastava | INS Kolkata INS Trikand INS Aditya | 20 – 23 September | Durban, South Africa | |
| | South Western Pacific Ocean: INS Sumitra – Commander KP Shreeshan | INS Sumitra | 10 – 12 October | Surabaya, Indonesia | |
| | South Western Pacific Ocean: INS Sumitra – Commander KP Shreeshan | INS Sumitra | 26 – 29 October | Suva, Fiji | |
| | South Western Pacific Ocean: INS Sumitra – Commander KP Shreeshan | INS Sumitra | 4 – 7 November | Sydney, Australia | |
| | South Western Pacific Ocean: INS Sumitra – Commander KP Shreeshan | INS Sumitra | 16 – 22 November | Auckland, New Zealand | |
| | South Western Pacific Ocean: INS Sumitra – Commander KP Shreeshan | INS Sumitra | 6 – 9 December | Darwin, Australia | |
| | South Western Pacific Ocean: INS Sumitra – Commander KP Shreeshan | INS Sumitra | 16 December | Jakarta, Indonesia | |
| Andaman & Nicobar Command | India-Indonesian CORPAT-2016 28th Edition: INS Karmuk – Commodore Girish Kumar Garg | INS Karmuk | 10 – 27 October | Belawan, Indonesia | |
| Southern Naval Command | South East Asia – Vice Admiral AR Karve: INS Tir – Captain DJ Revar; INS Sujata; INS Sudarshini; ICGS Varuna | INS Tir INS Sujata INS Sudarshini ICGS Varuna | 27 – 31 October | Phuket, Thailand | |
| Southern Naval Command | South East Asia – Vice Admiral AR Karve: INS Tir – Captain DJ Revar; INS Sujata; INS Sudarshini; ICGS Varuna | INS Tir INS Sujata INS Sudarshini ICGS Varuna | 2 – 6 November | Yangon, Myanmar | |
| Southern Naval Command | South East Asia – Vice Admiral AR Karve: INS Tir – Captain DJ Revar; INS Sujata; INS Sudarshini; ICGS Varuna | INS Tir INS Sujata INS Sudarshini ICGS Varuna | 11 – 15 November | Chittagong, Bangladesh | |
| | Hydro-graphic survey: INS Darshak – Captain Peush Pawsey | INS Darshak | 28 October – 29 November | Dar es Salaam, Tanzania | |
| | Hydro-graphic survey: INS Darshak – Captain Peush Pawsey | INS Darshak | 3 December – 3 January | Port Louis, Mauritius | |
| Eastern Naval Command | SIMBEX 2016 – Rear Admiral Biswajit Dasgupta: INS Ranvijay; INS Kamorta; Sindhugosh-class submarine | INS Ranvijay INS Kamorta Sindhugosh-class submarine | 31 October – 5 November | Visakhapatnam, India | |
| | Southern Indian Ocean: INS Shardul – Commander Abhishek Kumar | INS Shardul | 8 – 10 November | Port Louis, Mauritius | |
| | Southern Indian Ocean: INS Shardul – Commander Abhishek Kumar | INS Shardul | 23 November | Port Victoria, Seychelles | |
| | Sailing race: INSV Mhadei – Lt Commander Vartika Joshi | INSV Mhadei | 9 November | Goa, India | |
| | Sailing race: INSV Mhadei – Lt Commander Vartika Joshi | INSV Mhadei | 23 December – 1 January | Cape Town, South Africa | |
| | Sailing race: INSV Mhadei – Lt Commander Vartika Joshi | INSV Mhadei | May 2017 | Goa, India | |
| Western Naval Command | Konkan 2016 | | 5 – 16 December | Mumbai, India | |
| Eastern Naval Command | Operation Madad – Vice Admiral HCS Bisht: INS Shivalik; INS Kadmatt | INS Shivalik INS Kadmatt | 12 December | Chennai, India | HADR Operation for Cyclone Vardah |
| Eastern Naval Command | Indra 2016: INS Ranvir; INS Satpura; INS Kamorta | INS Ranvir INS Satpura INS Kamorta | 14 – 21 December | Visakhapatnam, India | |
| Western Naval Command | PASSEX with Japan Maritime Self-Defense Force: INS Trishul | INS Trishul | 22 December | Goa, India | |
| | Exercise Sagar Kavach | | 15 – 17 December | Kerala & Lakshdweep, India | Joint Exercise with other agencies |
| Eastern Naval Command & Andaman & Nicobar Command | Exercise Jal Prahar – Rear Admiral Biswajit Dasgupta: INS Jalashwa; INS Gharial; INS Cheetah | INS Jalashwa INS Gharial INS Cheetah | 22 December | Kakinada, India | Amphibious exercise with 108 Mountain Brigade and 91 Infantry Brigade |
2017
| Eastern Naval Command & Western Naval Command | Exercise Taiyaar 2017 | | January | | |
| Eastern Naval Command & Western Naval Command | TROPEX 2017 – Admiral Sunil Lanba: 60 ships; 5 submarines; 70 naval aircraft | | 24 January – 23 February | Arabian Sea and North Central Indian Ocean | A month long exercise with Indian Coast Guard, Indian Army and Indian Air Force |
| | IDEX 2017 & NAVDEX 2017: INS Sunayna | INS Sunayna | 18 February – 12 March | Abu Dabhi, UAE | |
| Eastern Naval Command | Hydro-graphic survey: INS Darshak – Captain Peush Pawsey | INS Darshak | 3 March – 12 May | Colombo & Galle, Sri Lanka | |
| Southern Naval Command | Southern Indian Ocean – Vice Admiral AR Karve: INS Tir; INS Sujata; INS Shardul; INS Sudarshini; ICGS Sarathi | INS Tir INS Sujata INS Sudarshini ICGS Sarathi | 11 March | Port Louis, Mauritius | |
| Southern Naval Command | Southern Indian Ocean – Vice Admiral AR Karve: INS Tir; INS Sujata; INS Shardul; INS Sudarshini; ICGS Sarathi | INS Tir INS Sujata INS Sudarshini ICGS Sarathi | 18 March | Port Victoria, Seychelles | |
| Southern Naval Command | Southern Indian Ocean – Vice Admiral AR Karve: INS Tir; INS Sujata; INS Shardul; INS Sudarshini; ICGS Sarathi | INS Tir INS Sujata INS Sudarshini ICGS Sarathi | 29 March – 2 April | Male, Maldives | |
| Southern Naval Command | Southern Indian Ocean – Vice Admiral AR Karve: INS Tir; INS Sujata; INS Shardul; INS Sudarshini; ICGS Sarathi | INS Sudarshini | 5 March – 4 April | Port Victoria, Seychelles | |
| Andaman & Nicobar Command | Indo-Myanmar CORPAT 2017 – 5th Edition: INS Karmuk – Commodre Ashutosh Ridhorkar; INS Bangaram | INS Karmuk INS Bangaram | 12 – 18 March | Yangon, Myanmar | |
| | Southern Indian Ocean EEZ Surveillance: INS Shardul – Commander Rohit Mishra | INS Shardul | 8 – 26 March | Port Louis, Mauritius | |
| | Southern Indian Ocean EEZ Surveillance: INS Shardul – Commander Rohit Mishra | INS Shardul | 27 March – Mid April | Port Victoria, Seychelles | |
| | Joint Amphibious Workup: INS Jalashwa; INS Gharial; 91 Infantry Brigade (Indian Army) | INS Jalashwa INS Gharial | 19 – 31 March | Karwar, India | |
| Andaman & Nicobar Command | LIMA 2017: INS Kora | INS Kora | 20 – 26 March | Langkawi, Malaysia | |
| | Assistance to MV MSC Daniela: INS Darshak; INS Gharial; ICGS Shoor | INS Darshak INS Gharial ICGS Shoor | 4 – 6 April | Colombo, Sri Lanka | |
| Andaman & Nicobar Command | Indo-Thai CORPAT-2016 24th Edition | | 9 – 21 April | Port Blair, India | |
| Western Naval Command | West Africa and Mediterranean Sea – Rear Admiral R. B. Pandit: INS Mumbai – Captain Sunil Kumar Roy; INS Tarkash – Captain Rituraj Sahu; INS Trishul – Captain S Sachdeva; INS Aditya | INS Mumbai INS Trishul INS Tarkash INS Aditya | 18 – 21 April | Souda Bay, Greece | PASSEX with Hpellenic Navy |
| Western Naval Command | West Africa and Mediterranean Sea – Rear Admiral R. B. Pandit: INS Mumbai – Captain Sunil Kumar Roy; INS Tarkash – Captain Rituraj Sahu; INS Trishul – Captain S Sachdeva; INS Aditya | INS Mumbai INS Trishul INS Aditya | 24 – 30 April | Toulon, France | VARUNA 2017 with French Navy |
| Western Naval Command | West Africa and Mediterranean Sea – Rear Admiral R. B. Pandit: INS Mumbai – Captain Sunil Kumar Roy; INS Tarkash – Captain Rituraj Sahu; INS Trishul – Captain S Sachdeva; INS Aditya | INS Mumbai INS Trishul INS Aditya | | Valencia, Spain | |
| Western Naval Command | West Africa and Mediterranean Sea – Rear Admiral R. B. Pandit: INS Mumbai – Captain Sunil Kumar Roy; INS Tarkash – Captain Rituraj Sahu; INS Trishul – Captain S Sachdeva; INS Aditya | INS Tarkash | 2 – 5 May | Plymouth, United Kingdom | KONKAN 2017 with Royal Navy |
| Western Naval Command | West Africa and Mediterranean Sea – Rear Admiral R. B. Pandit: INS Mumbai – Captain Sunil Kumar Roy; INS Tarkash – Captain Rituraj Sahu; INS Trishul – Captain S Sachdeva; INS Aditya | INS Mumbai INS Trishul INS Aditya | 5 – 8 May | Alexandria, Egypt | |
| Western Naval Command | West Africa and Mediterranean Sea – Rear Admiral R. B. Pandit: INS Mumbai – Captain Sunil Kumar Roy; INS Tarkash – Captain Rituraj Sahu; INS Trishul – Captain S Sachdeva; INS Aditya | INS Tarkash | 7 – 10 May | London, United Kingdom | |
| Western Naval Command | West Africa and Mediterranean Sea – Rear Admiral R. B. Pandit: INS Mumbai – Captain Sunil Kumar Roy; INS Tarkash – Captain Rituraj Sahu; INS Trishul – Captain S Sachdeva; INS Aditya | INS Mumbai INS Trishul INS Aditya | 9 -12 May | Haifa, Israel | |
| Western Naval Command | West Africa and Mediterranean Sea – Rear Admiral R. B. Pandit: INS Mumbai – Captain Sunil Kumar Roy; INS Tarkash – Captain Rituraj Sahu; INS Trishul – Captain S Sachdeva; INS Aditya | INS Tarkash | 14 – 17 May | Lisbon, Portugal | |
| Western Naval Command | West Africa and Mediterranean Sea – Rear Admiral R. B. Pandit: INS Mumbai – Captain Sunil Kumar Roy; INS Tarkash – Captain Rituraj Sahu; INS Trishul – Captain S Sachdeva; INS Aditya | INS Mumbai INS Trishul INS Aditya | 16 – 20 May | Jeddah, Saudi Arabia | |
| Western Naval Command | West Africa and Mediterranean Sea – Rear Admiral R. B. Pandit: INS Mumbai – Captain Sunil Kumar Roy; INS Tarkash – Captain Rituraj Sahu; INS Trishul – Captain S Sachdeva; INS Aditya | INS Tarkash | 19 May | Casablanca, Morocco | |
| Western Naval Command | West Africa and Mediterranean Sea – Rear Admiral R. B. Pandit: INS Mumbai – Captain Sunil Kumar Roy; INS Tarkash – Captain Rituraj Sahu; INS Trishul – Captain S Sachdeva; INS Aditya | INS Tarkash | 31 May | Lagos, Nigeria | |
| Western Naval Command | West Africa and Mediterranean Sea – Rear Admiral R. B. Pandit: INS Mumbai – Captain Sunil Kumar Roy; INS Tarkash – Captain Rituraj Sahu; INS Trishul – Captain S Sachdeva; INS Aditya | INS Tarkash | 10 June | Luanda, Angola | |
| Western Naval Command | West Africa and Mediterranean Sea – Rear Admiral R. B. Pandit: INS Mumbai – Captain Sunil Kumar Roy; INS Tarkash – Captain Rituraj Sahu; INS Trishul – Captain S Sachdeva; INS Aditya | INS Tarkash | 15 – 18 June | Walvis Bay, Namibia | |
| Western Naval Command | West Africa and Mediterranean Sea – Rear Admiral R. B. Pandit: INS Mumbai – Captain Sunil Kumar Roy; INS Tarkash – Captain Rituraj Sahu; INS Trishul – Captain S Sachdeva; INS Aditya | INS Tarkash | 21 – 24 June | Cape Town, South Africa | |
| Western Naval Command | West Africa and Mediterranean Sea – Rear Admiral R. B. Pandit: INS Mumbai – Captain Sunil Kumar Roy; INS Tarkash – Captain Rituraj Sahu; INS Trishul – Captain S Sachdeva; INS Aditya | INS Tarkash | 3 – 6 July | Port Louis, Mauritius | |
| Andaman & Nicobar Command | India-Indonesian CORPAT-2017 29th Edition | | 9 – 12 May | Port Blair, India | |
| Andaman & Nicobar Command | India-Indonesian CORPAT-2017 29th Edition | | 22 – 25 May | Belawan, Indonesia | |
| Eastern Naval Command | INS Rajput – Captain R A Shah | INS Rajput | 11 – 13 May | Yangon, Myanmar | Operational Turn around (OTR) |
| Eastern Naval Command | South East Asia – Rear Admiral Biswajit Dasgupta: INS Shivalik – Captain R Vinod Kumar; INS Sahyadri – Captain Anil Jaggi; INS Kamorta – Commander Vipin Gupta; INS Jyoti – Captain S Shyam Sundar | INS Sahyadri INS Kamorta | 11 – 24 May | Singapore | International Maritime Review and SIMBEX 2017 |
| Eastern Naval Command | South East Asia – Rear Admiral Biswajit Dasgupta: INS Shivalik – Captain R Vinod Kumar; INS Sahyadri – Captain Anil Jaggi; INS Kamorta – Commander Vipin Gupta; INS Jyoti – Captain S Shyam Sundar | INS Shivalik INS Jyoti | 14 – 19 May | Kuantan, Malaysia | |
| Eastern Naval Command | South East Asia – Rear Admiral Biswajit Dasgupta: INS Shivalik – Captain R Vinod Kumar; INS Sahyadri – Captain Anil Jaggi; INS Kamorta – Commander Vipin Gupta; INS Jyoti – Captain S Shyam Sundar | INS Shivalik INS Jyoti | 21 – 24 May | Singapore | SIMBEX 2017 |
| Eastern Naval Command | South East Asia – Rear Admiral Biswajit Dasgupta: INS Shivalik – Captain R Vinod Kumar; INS Sahyadri – Captain Anil Jaggi; INS Kamorta – Commander Vipin Gupta; INS Jyoti – Captain S Shyam Sundar | INS Sahyadri INS Kamorta INS Shivalik INS Jyoti | 26 – 30 May | Jakarta, Indonesia | |
| Eastern Naval Command | South East Asia – Rear Admiral Biswajit Dasgupta: INS Shivalik – Captain R Vinod Kumar; INS Sahyadri – Captain Anil Jaggi; INS Kamorta – Commander Vipin Gupta; INS Jyoti – Captain S Shyam Sundar | INS Sahyadri INS Kamorta INS Shivalik INS Jyoti | 1 – 5 June | Surabaya, Indonesia | |
| Eastern Naval Command | South East Asia – Rear Admiral Biswajit Dasgupta: INS Shivalik – Captain R Vinod Kumar; INS Sahyadri – Captain Anil Jaggi; INS Kamorta – Commander Vipin Gupta; INS Jyoti – Captain S Shyam Sundar | INS Sahyadri | 12 – 15 June | Port Moresby, Papua New Guinea | |
| Eastern Naval Command | South East Asia – Rear Admiral Biswajit Dasgupta: INS Shivalik – Captain R Vinod Kumar; INS Sahyadri – Captain Anil Jaggi; INS Kamorta – Commander Vipin Gupta; INS Jyoti – Captain S Shyam Sundar | INS Kamorta INS Shivalik INS Jyoti | 13 – 17 June | Fremantle, Australia | AUSINDEX 2017 |
| Western Naval Command | Joint Humanitarian Assistance and Disaster Relief (HADR) Exercise – Karavali Karunya | | 18 – 20 May | Karwar, India | |
| | Maria3 landing craft search: INS Kirch | INS Kirch | 20 May | Maldives | |
| Southern Naval Command | Training Mission: INS Sumedha | INS Sumedha | 21 – 24 May | Colombo, Sri Lanka | |
| Eastern Naval Command | HADR to Sri Lanka: INS Kirch; INS Jalashwa; INS Shardul | INS Kirch INS Jalashwa INS Shardul | 27 May | Colombo, Sri Lanka | |
| Eastern Naval Command | SAR during Cyclone Mora in Bay of Bengal: INS Sumitra – Commander K P Shreesan; INS Gharial | INS Sumitra | 30 May – 2 June | Chittagong, Bangladesh | |
| Eastern Naval Command | SAR during Cyclone Mora in Bay of Bengal: INS Sumitra – Commander K P Shreesan; INS Gharial | INS Gharial | 31 May – 2 June | Chittagong, Bangladesh | |
| Eastern Naval Command | SAR during Cyclone Mora in Bay of Bengal: INS Sumitra – Commander K P Shreesan; INS Gharial | INS Sumitra | 6 – 8 June | Yangon, Myanmar | |
| Western Naval Command | Deployment to Mauritius EEZ: INS Teg – Captain Nirbhay Bapna | INS Teg | 3 – 6 June | Port Louis, Mauritius | |
| Southern Naval Command | INSV Tarini – Lieutenant Commander Vartika Joshi | INSV Tarini | 6 June | Port Louis, Mauritius | |
| Western Naval Command | SAR for Mexican Sail Training Ship (STS) Cuauhtemoc: INS Teg – Captain Nirbhay Bapna; INS Mysore | INS Mysore INS Teg | 12 – 13 June | Arabian Sea | |
| Southern Naval Command | Seychelles National Day Celebrations: INS Sunyana | INS Sunyana | 26 – 30 June | Port Victoria, Seychelles | |
| Southern Naval Command | PASSEX with HMAS Newcastle: INS Sunyana | INS Sunyana | 7 July | Kochi, India | |
| Eastern Naval Command | Malabar 2017: INS Vikramaditya; INS Ranvir; INS Shivalik; INS Sahyadri; INS Kamorta; INS Kora; INS Kirpan; Sindhughosh class submarine; INS Jyoti | INS Vikramaditya INS Ranvir INS Shivalik INS Sahyadri INS Kamorta INS Kora INS Kirpan Sindhughosh class submarine INS Jyoti | 10 – 17 July | Chennai, India | |
| Eastern Naval Command | INS Ranvir – Captain R Ashok | INS Ranvir | 24 – 27 July | Chittagong, Bangladesh | |
| | Guangzhou Nansha International Regatta | | 28 – 30 July | Guangzhou city, China | |
| Western Naval Command | Anti-Piracy Patrol: INS Tabar | INS Tabar | 1 August | Gulf of Aden | |
| Eastern Naval Command | SLINEX 2017: INS Gharial; INS Kora | INS Gharial INS Kora | 7 – 14 September | Visakhapatnam, India | |
| Southern Naval Command | Navika Sagar Parikrama: INSV Tarini – Lt. Commander Vartika Joshi | INSV Tarini | 10 September | Goa, India | |
| Southern Naval Command | Navika Sagar Parikrama: INSV Tarini – Lt. Commander Vartika Joshi | INSV Tarini | 23 October – 5 November | Fremantle, Australia | |
| Southern Naval Command | Navika Sagar Parikrama: INSV Tarini – Lt. Commander Vartika Joshi | INSV Tarini | 29 November – 12 December | Lyttleton, New Zealand | |
| Southern Naval Command | Navika Sagar Parikrama: INSV Tarini – Lt. Commander Vartika Joshi | INSV Tarini | 22 January – 4 February (2018) | Port Stanley, Falkland Islands | |
| Southern Naval Command | Navika Sagar Parikrama: INSV Tarini – Lt. Commander Vartika Joshi | INSV Tarini | 2 – 14 March (2018) | Cape Town, South Africa | |
| Southern Naval Command | Navika Sagar Parikrama: INSV Tarini – Lt. Commander Vartika Joshi | INSV Tarini | 18 – 26 April (2018) | Port Louis, Mauritius | Unscheduled repair stop |
| Southern Naval Command | Navika Sagar Parikrama: INSV Tarini – Lt. Commander Vartika Joshi | INSV Tarini | 21 May (2018) | Goa, India | |
| Eastern Naval Command | East and South-East Asia: INS Satpura – Captain Rahul Shankar; INS Kadmatt – Commander Nithin Cariappa | INS Satpura INS Kadmatt | 14 – 17 September | Singapore | |
| Eastern Naval Command | East and South-East Asia: INS Satpura – Captain Rahul Shankar; INS Kadmatt – Commander Nithin Cariappa | INS Satpura INS Kadmatt | 23 – 26 September | Haiphong, Vietnam | |
| Eastern Naval Command | East and South-East Asia: INS Satpura – Captain Rahul Shankar; INS Kadmatt – Commander Nithin Cariappa | INS Satpura INS Kadmatt | 3 – 6 October | Manila, Philippines | |
| Eastern Naval Command | East and South-East Asia: INS Satpura – Captain Rahul Shankar; INS Kadmatt – Commander Nithin Cariappa | INS Satpura INS Kadmatt | 12 – 15 October | Sasebo, Japan | |
| Eastern Naval Command | East and South-East Asia: INS Satpura – Captain Rahul Shankar; INS Kadmatt – Commander Nithin Cariappa | INS Satpura INS Kadmatt | 18 – 29 October | Vladivostok, Russia | INDRA 2017 |
| Eastern Naval Command | East and South-East Asia: INS Satpura – Captain Rahul Shankar; INS Kadmatt – Commander Nithin Cariappa | INS Satpura INS Kadmatt | 6 November | Sea of Japan | PASSEX with USN |
| Eastern Naval Command | East and South-East Asia: INS Satpura – Captain Rahul Shankar; INS Kadmatt – Commander Nithin Cariappa | INS Satpura INS Kadmatt | 17 – 22 November | Pattaya, Thailand | ASEAN IFR |
| Eastern Naval Command | East and South-East Asia: INS Satpura – Captain Rahul Shankar; INS Kadmatt – Commander Nithin Cariappa | INS Kadmatt | 24 – 26 November | Sihanoukville, Cambodia | |
| Eastern Naval Command | East and South-East Asia: INS Satpura – Captain Rahul Shankar; INS Kadmatt – Commander Nithin Cariappa | INS Satpura | 25 – 28 November | Muara, Brunei | |
| Eastern Naval Command | East and South-East Asia: INS Satpura – Captain Rahul Shankar; INS Kadmatt – Commander Nithin Cariappa | INS Kadmatt | 30 November – 2 December | Belawan, Indonesia | |
| Eastern Naval Command | East and South-East Asia: INS Satpura – Captain Rahul Shankar; INS Kadmatt – Commander Nithin Cariappa | INS Satpura INS Kadmatt | 2 – 5 December | Malaysia | HADR exercise and PASSEX |
| Western Naval Command | Western Arabian Sea and Southern Indian Ocean: INS Kochi; INS Mumbai; INS Shishumar | INS Mumbai INS Shishumar | 20 September | Duqm, Oman | |
| Eastern Naval Command | Operation Insaniyat – HADR Bangladesh for Rohingya crisis: INS Gharial – Commander Suraj J Rebeira | INS Gharial | 25 – 29 September | Chittagong, Bangladesh | |
| Western Naval Command | Northern Arabian Sea: INS Trishul | INS Trishul | 5 October | Arabian Sea | |
| Southern Naval Command | South-East Asia: INS Tir – Captain DJ Revar; INS Sujata; INS Sudarshini; INS Shardul; ICGS Sarathi | INS Tir INS Sujata INS Shardul ICGS Sarathi | 3 – 12 October | Penang, Malaysia | |
| Southern Naval Command | South-East Asia: INS Tir – Captain DJ Revar; INS Sujata; INS Sudarshini; INS Shardul; ICGS Sarathi | INS Tir INS Sujata INS Shardul ICGS Sarathi | 18 – 22 October | Jakarta, Indonesia | |
| Southern Naval Command | South-East Asia: INS Tir – Captain DJ Revar; INS Sujata; INS Sudarshini; INS Shardul; ICGS Sarathi | INS Tir INS Sujata INS Shardul ICGS Sarathi | 1 – 6 November | Colombo, Sri Lanka | |
| Southern Naval Command | South-East Asia: INS Tir – Captain DJ Revar; INS Sujata; INS Sudarshini; INS Shardul; ICGS Sarathi | INS Sudarshini | 3 October – 7 November | Jakarta, Indonesia | |
| Andaman & Nicobar Command | INS Sumedha | INS Sumedha | 8 – 15 October | Male, Maldives | |
| Andaman & Nicobar Command | India-Indonesian CORPAT-2017 30th Edition: INS Sukanya | INS Sukanya | 24 October – 5 November | Belawan, Indonesia | |
| Southern Naval Command | Hydrographic Survey of Southern and Western coast: INS Sutlej | INS Sutlej | 26 October – 21 December | Colombo, Sri Lanka | |
| Western Naval Command | EEZ Surveillance: INS Tarkash | INS Tarkash | 21 October – 1 November | Port Victoria, Seychelles | |
| Western Naval Command | EEZ Surveillance: INS Tarkash | INS Tarkash | 2 – 9 November | Port Louis, Mauritius | |
| Southern Naval Command | Hydrographic Survey of Pemba Island: INS Sarvekshak – Captain Peush Pawsey | INS Sarvekshak | 15 November | Dar es Salaam, Tanzania | |
| Western Naval Command | National Day Celebrations and Presence-Surveillance mission: INS Trikand | INS Trikand | 18 – 25 November | Muscat, Oman | |
| Andaman & Nicobar Command | DANX | | 20 – 24 November | Andaman & Nicobar Islands, India | |
| Eastern Naval Command | IMMSAREX: INS Ranvir; INS Sahyadri; INS Gharial; INS Sukanya | INS Ranvir INS Sahyadri INS Gharial INS Sukanya | 26 – 28 November | Chittagong, Bangladesh | |
| Southern Naval Command and Western Naval Command | HADR and SAR for Cyclone Okhi: INS Kolkata; INS Chennai; INS Mumbai; INS Trikand; INS Shardul; INS Sharda; INS Subhadra; INS Nireekshak; INS Jamuna; INS Kabra; INS Kalpeni; INS Koswari; INS Sagardhwani; ICGS Samar; ICGS Sarathi; ICGS Sanklap; ICGS Samrat; ICGS Shoor; ICGS Abhinav; ICGS Aadesh; ICGS Abhiraaj; ICGS Vaibhav; ICGS Kasturba Gandhi | INS Kolkata INS Chennai INS Mumbai INS Trikand INS Shardul INS Sharda INS Subhadra INS Nireekshak INS Jamuna INS Kabra INS Kalpeni INS Koswari INS Sagardhwani ICGS Samar ICGS Sarathi ICGS Sanklap ICGS Samrat ICGS Shoor ICGS Abhinav ICGS Aadesh ICGS Abhiraaj ICGS Kasturba Gandhi ICGS Kasturba Gandhi | 30 November – 10 December | Vizhinjam and Lakshadweep, India | |
| Western Naval Command | Anti-piracy deployment in Gulf of Aden: INS Trishul – Captain Ajay Shukla | INS Trishul | 4 December | Salalah, Oman | |
| Western Naval Command | Persian Gulf: INS Teg – Captain Nirbahy Bapna; INS Trikand – Captain Upal Kundu; INS Shankush | INS Teg INS Trikand INS Shankush | 17 – 23 December | Muscat, Oman | Exercise Naseem Al Bahr XI |
| Western Naval Command | Persian Gulf: INS Teg – Captain Nirbahy Bapna; INS Trikand – Captain Upal Kundu; INS Shankush | INS Teg INS Trikand | 23 – 26 December | Abu Dabhi, UAE | |
| Western Naval Command | PASSEX with French Navy: INS Tarkash | INS Tarkash | 24 December | Goa, India | |
| | Hydrographic Survey: INS Sarvekshak | INS Sarvekshak | 30 December | Port Louis, Mauritius | |
2018
| Western Naval Command | Operational Exercise: INS Vikramaditya; INS Kolkata; INS Deepak | INS Vikramaditya INS Kolkata INS Deepak | 8 – 9 January | Arabian sea | |
| Eastern Naval Command, Western Naval Command, Andaman & Nicobar Command and Indian Coast Guard | Eastern Naval Command Operational Readiness Exercise (Encore) | | January – 7 February | Indian Ocean Region | |
| Western Naval Command | SAR operation for ONGC Helicopter: INS Teg; INS Tarasa; T11; T45; ICGS Samudra Prahari; ICGS Agrim; ICGS Achook | INS Teg INS Tarasa T11 T45 ICGS Samudra Prahari ICGS Agrim ICGS Achook | 13 January | Mumbai High North | |
| Andaman & Nicobar Command | India-Thai CORPAT-2018 25th Edition – Commodore A Ridhorkar: INS Saryu – Commander Syed Qais Sayat | INS Saryu | 23 – 31 January | Phuket, Thailand | |
| Eastern Naval Command | PASSEX with Bangladesh Navy: INS Ranjit; INS Khukri | INS Ranjit INS Khukri | 12 – 14 February | Chennai, India | |
| Western Naval Command and Eastern Naval Command | Paschim Lehar – Tri service exercise with Indian Air Force, Indian Army and Indian Coast Guard: INS Vikramaditya – Captain Ajay Kochhar; Kolkata-class destroyers; Veer-class corvettes | INS Vikramaditya | 12 February – 1 March | Arabian sea | |
| Southern Naval Command | Southern Indian Ocean: INS Tir; INS Sujata; ICGS Sarathi | INS Tir INS Sujata ICGS Sarathi | 20 – 28 February | Port Victoria, Seychelles | |
| Southern Naval Command | Southern Indian Ocean: INS Tir; INS Sujata; ICGS Sarathi | INS Tir INS Sujata ICGS Sarathi | 10 March | Port Louis, Mauritius | |
| Southern Naval Command | Southern Indian Ocean: INS Tir; INS Sujata; ICGS Sarathi | INS Tir INS Sujata ICGS Sarathi | 20 March | Dar es Salaam, Tanzania | |
| Andaman & Nicobar Command | MILAN 2018: INS Sahyadri – Captain Anil Jaggi; INS Kirch; INS Kulish; INS Saryu; INS Kesari; INS Jyoti; INLCU 51 | INS Sahyadri INS Kirch INS Kulish INS Saryu INS Kesari INS Jyoti INLCU 51 | 6 – 13 March | Port Blair, India | |
| Western Naval Command | Persian Gulf: INS Kolkata – Captain Susheel Menon; INS Gomati – Captain Ravi Kumar Dhingra | INS Kolkata | 11 – 15 March | Doha, Qatar | DIMDEX and PASSEX with Qatari Emiri Navy |
| Western Naval Command | Persian Gulf: INS Kolkata – Captain Susheel Menon; INS Gomati – Captain Ravi Kumar Dhingra | INS Kolkata INS Gomati | 18 – 22 March | Port Zayed, UAE | Gulf Star 1 naval exercise |
| Andaman & Nicobar Command | Indo-Myanmar CORPAT 6th Edition: INS Kulish; INS Baratang | INS Kulish INS Baratang | 14 – 18 March | Port Blair, India | |
| Western Naval Command | Varuna 2018 (Phase I) with French Navy: INS Mumbai; INS Trikand; INS Kalvari | INS Mumbai INS Trikand INS Kalvari | 15 – 24 March | Goa, India | |
| Eastern Naval Command | INMEX 1st Edition with Myanmar Navy: INS Sahyadri – Captain Anil Jaggi; INS Kamorta; Sindhughosh-class submarine | INS Sahyadri INS Kamorta | 25 March – 3 April | Visakhapatnam, India | |
| Western Naval Command | Training Exercise with US Navy: INS Tarkash | INS Tarkash | 26 March | Persian Gulf | |
| Western Naval Command | Operational exercise: INS Vikramaditya; INS Kolkata; INS Chennai; INS Teg; INS Trishul; INS Vidyut; INS Kalvari | INS Vikramaditya INS Kolkata INS Chennai INS Teg INS Trishul INS Vidyut INS Kalvari | 4 April | Arabian sea | |
| Southern Naval Command | Exercise Chakravath – HADR | | 5 – 6 April | Kochi, India | |
| Eastern Naval Command | Varuna 2018 (Phase II) with French Navy: INS Rana; INS Kirch | INS Rana INS Kirch | 7 – 8 April | Chennai, India | |
| Eastern Naval Command | DefExpo 2018: INS Sahyadri – Captain Anil Jaggi; INS Kamorta; INS Kirch; INS Airavat; INS Sumitra | INS Sahyadri INS Kamorta INS Kirch INS Airavat INS Sumitra | 13 – 15 April | Chennai, India | |
| Southern Naval Command | Lokayan 2018: INS Tarangini – Commander Rahul Mehta | INS Tarangini | 11 April | Kochi, India | |
| Southern Naval Command | Lokayan 2018: INS Tarangini – Commander Rahul Mehta | INS Tarangini | 22 April | Salalah, Oman | |
| Southern Naval Command | Lokayan 2018: INS Tarangini – Commander Rahul Mehta | INS Tarangini | 6 – 9 May | Jeddah, Saudi Arabia | |
| Southern Naval Command | Lokayan 2018: INS Tarangini – Commander Rahul Mehta | INS Tarangini | 27 May | Valletta, Malta | |
| Southern Naval Command | Lokayan 2018: INS Tarangini – Commander Rahul Mehta | INS Tarangini | 4 – 6 June | Lisbon, Portugal | |
| Southern Naval Command | Lokayan 2018: INS Tarangini – Commander Rahul Mehta | INS Tarangini | 14 June | Bordeaux, France | Tall Regatta Ship Festival |
| Southern Naval Command | Lokayan 2018: INS Tarangini – Commander Rahul Mehta | INS Tarangini | 13 July | Sunderland, United Kingdom | Tall Ship Races |
| Southern Naval Command | Lokayan 2018: INS Tarangini – Commander Rahul Mehta | INS Tarangini | | Esbjerg, Denmark | |
| Southern Naval Command | Lokayan 2018: INS Tarangini – Commander Rahul Mehta | INS Tarangini | | Stavanger, Norway | |
| Southern Naval Command | Lokayan 2018: INS Tarangini – Commander Rahul Mehta | INS Tarangini | | Harlingen, Netherlands | |
| Southern Naval Command | Lokayan 2018: INS Tarangini – Commander Rahul Mehta | INS Tarangini | | Amsterdam, Netherlands | |
| Southern Naval Command | Lokayan 2018: INS Tarangini – Commander Rahul Mehta | INS Tarangini | | Le Havre, France | |
| Southern Naval Command | Lokayan 2018: INS Tarangini – Commander Rahul Mehta | INS Tarangini | 30 October | Kochi, India | |
| Western Naval Command | Southern Indian Ocean: INS Mumbai; INS Trikand | INS Mumbai INS Trikand | 23 April | Port Victoria, Seychelles | |
| Western Naval Command | Southern Indian Ocean: INS Mumbai; INS Trikand | INS Mumbai INS Trikand | 1 May | Port Louis, Mauritius | |
| Western Naval Command | Southern Indian Ocean: INS Mumbai; INS Trikand | INS Mumbai INS Trikand | 1 – 7 May | Réunion, France | Varuna 2018 (Phase II|) with French Navy |
| Western Naval Command | Southern Indian Ocean: INS Mumbai; INS Trikand | INS Mumbai INS Trikand | 13 May | Moroni, Comoros | |
| Western Naval Command | Southern Indian Ocean: INS Mumbai; INS Trikand | INS Mumbai INS Trikand | 18 May | Antsiranana, Madagascar | |
| Southern Naval Command | Exercise Sagar Kavach | | 24 – 26 April | Kochi, India | |
| | Exercise Ekatha 2018 with MNDF: MARCOS | | 28 April – 15 May | Maafilhafushi, Maldives | |
| Eastern Naval Command | East and South-East Asia – Rear Admiral Dinesh K Tripathi: INS Sahyadri – Captain Shantanu Jha; INS Kamorta – Commander S Chatterjee; INS Shakti – Captain Joglekar | INS Sahyadri INS Kamorta INS Shakti | 6 – 8 May | Singapore | |
| Eastern Naval Command | East and South-East Asia – Rear Admiral Dinesh K Tripathi: INS Sahyadri – Captain Shantanu Jha; INS Kamorta – Commander S Chatterjee; INS Shakti – Captain Joglekar | INS Sahyadri INS Shakti | 13 – 16 May | Sattahip, Thailand | |
| Eastern Naval Command | East and South-East Asia – Rear Admiral Dinesh K Tripathi: INS Sahyadri – Captain Shantanu Jha; INS Kamorta – Commander S Chatterjee; INS Shakti – Captain Joglekar | INS Kamorta | 14 – 17 May | Kota Kinabalu, Malaysia | PASSEX with Royal Malaysian Navy |
| Eastern Naval Command | East and South-East Asia – Rear Admiral Dinesh K Tripathi: INS Sahyadri – Captain Shantanu Jha; INS Kamorta – Commander S Chatterjee; INS Shakti – Captain Joglekar | INS Sahyadri INS Kamorta INS Shakti | 21 – 25 May | Da Nang, Vietnam | |
| Eastern Naval Command | East and South-East Asia – Rear Admiral Dinesh K Tripathi: INS Sahyadri – Captain Shantanu Jha; INS Kamorta – Commander S Chatterjee; INS Shakti – Captain Joglekar | INS Sahyadri INS Kamorta INS Shakti | 7 – 15 June | Guam, United States | Malabar 2018 exercise with US Navy and JMSDF |
| Eastern Naval Command | East and South-East Asia – Rear Admiral Dinesh K Tripathi: INS Sahyadri – Captain Shantanu Jha; INS Kamorta – Commander S Chatterjee; INS Shakti – Captain Joglekar | INS Kamorta INS Jyoti | 24- 26 June | Makassar, Indonesia | |
| Eastern Naval Command | East and South-East Asia – Rear Admiral Dinesh K Tripathi: INS Sahyadri – Captain Shantanu Jha; INS Kamorta – Commander S Chatterjee; INS Shakti – Captain Joglekar | INS Sahyadri | 27 June – 2 August | Pearl Harbor, United States | Exercise RIMPAC 2018 |
| Eastern Naval Command | East and South-East Asia – Rear Admiral Dinesh K Tripathi: INS Sahyadri – Captain Shantanu Jha; INS Kamorta – Commander S Chatterjee; INS Shakti – Captain Joglekar | INS Sahyadri | 13 – 16 August | Suva, Fiji | |
| Eastern Naval Command | East and South-East Asia – Rear Admiral Dinesh K Tripathi: INS Sahyadri – Captain Shantanu Jha; INS Kamorta – Commander S Chatterjee; INS Shakti – Captain Joglekar | INS Sahyadri | 29 August – 15 September | Darwin, Australia | Exercise Kakadu 2018 |
| Andaman & Nicobar Command | Economic Zone (EEZ) Surveillance (9–17 May): INS Sumedha | INS Sumedha | 11 -12 May | Male, Maldives | |
| Andaman & Nicobar Command | India-Indonesian CORPAT-2018 31st Edition – Commodore Ashutosh Ridhorkar: INS Kulish – Commander Deepak Bali | INS Kulish | 24 – 25 May | Port Blair, India | |
| Andaman & Nicobar Command | India-Indonesian CORPAT-2018 31st Edition – Commodore Ashutosh Ridhorkar: INS Kulish – Commander Deepak Bali | INS Kulish | 6 – 9 June | Belawan, Indonesia | |
| Eastern Naval Command | South east Asia deployment: INS Satpura | INS Satpura | 2 June | Singapore | |
| Southern Naval Command | Operation Nistar – HADR for cyclone Mekenu: INS Sunayna | INS Sunayna | 3 June | Socotra, Yemen | |
| Andaman & Nicobar Command | India-Thai CORPAT-2018 26th Edition: INS Kesari | INS Kesari | 16 – 22 June | Port Blair, India | |
| Eastern Naval Command | India-Bangladesh CORPAT-2018 1st Edition: INS Satpura; INS Kadmatt | INS Satpura INS Kadmatt | 27 June | Chittagong, Bangladesh | |
| Western Naval Command | INS Trikand – Captain Upal Kundu | INS Trikand | 7 – 9 July | Colombo, Sri Lanka | |
| Andaman & Nicobar Command | Malacca straits operational deployment: INS Sumitra – Commander Rajesh Rana | INS Sumitra | 11 July | Sabang, Indonesia | |
| Western Naval Command | Anti-piracy patrol in Gulf of Aden under Combined Task Force: INS Teg | INS Teg | 16 July | Djibouti, Djibouti | |
| Western Naval Command | Arabian Sea operational deployment: INS Tarkash | INS Tarkash | 18 July | Mombasa, Kenya | |
| Western Naval Command | Arabian Sea operational deployment: INS Tarkash | INS Tarkash | 24 – 26 July | Bandar Abbas, Iran | |
| Eastern Naval Command | Operational Turn-around: INS Khanjar – Commander V Shirdikant | INS Khanjar | 18 – 20 August | Yangon, Myanmar | |
| Eastern Naval Command | SLINEX 2018 – Rear Admiral Dinesh Kumar Tripathi: INS Kirch; INS Sumitra; INS Cora Divh | INS Kirch INS Sumitra INS Cora Divh | 7 – 13 September | Trincomalee, Sri Lanka | |
| Western Naval Command | East Africa and the Southern Indian Ocean – Vice Admiral Girish Luthra: INS Kolkata – Captain Susheel Menon; INS Tarkash – Captain Ajay D. Theophilus | INS Kolkata INS Tarkash | 15 – 18 September | Mombasa, Kenya | |
| Western Naval Command | East Africa and the Southern Indian Ocean – Vice Admiral Girish Luthra: INS Kolkata – Captain Susheel Menon; INS Tarkash – Captain Ajay D. Theophilus | INS Kolkata INS Tarkash | 1 -13 October | Simon's Town, South Africa | IBSAMAR IV |
| Western Naval Command | West Asia: INS Mumbai – Captain Amit Srivastava | INS Mumbai | 19 – 21 September | Hamad, Qatar | |
| Eastern Naval Command | Southern Indian Ocean deployment and Golden Globe Rescue Mission: INS Satpura – Captain Alok Ananda; INS Jyoti | INS Satpura INS Jyoti | 21 September – 2 October | South Indian Ocean | |
| Andaman & Nicobar Command | Indo-Myanmar CORPAT 7th Edition: INS Kulish – Commander Deepak Bali; INS Battimalv – Lt Commander M C Chandeep | INS Kulish INS Battimalv | 24 – 26 September | Yangon, Myanmar | |
| Southern Naval Command | INS Sudarshini; INS Sujata; INS Sarathi; INS Shardul; INS Tir | INS Sudarshini INS Sujata INS Sarathi INS Shardul INS Tir | 30 September – 2 October | Singapore | |
| Eastern Naval Command | Operational deployment to the North West Pacific: INS Rana – Captain Atul Deswal | INS Rana | 27 – 30 September | Ho Chi Minh City, Vietnam | |
| Eastern Naval Command | Operational deployment to the North West Pacific: INS Rana – Captain Atul Deswal | INS Rana | 8 – 15 October | Jeju Naval Base, South Korea | IFR and PASSEX |
| Eastern Naval Command | Operational deployment to the North West Pacific: INS Rana – Captain Atul Deswal | INS Rana | 12 – 18 November | Surabaya, Indonesia | Exercise Samudra Shakti |
| Eastern Naval Command | JIMEX 18 – Rear Admiral Dinesh K Tripathi: INS Satpura; INS Kadmatt; INS Shakti | INS Satpura INS Kadmatt INS Shakti | 7 – 15 October | Visakhapatnam, India | |
| Southern Naval Command | Anti-piracy patrol in Gulf of Aden: INS Sunayna – Commander Harish Srinivasan | INS Sunayna | 11 October | Djibouti, Djibouti | |
| Southern Naval Command | Anti-piracy patrol in Gulf of Aden: INS Sunayna – Commander Harish Srinivasan | INS Sunayna | 18 November | Gulf of Aden | PASSEX with JMSDF |
| Eastern Naval Command | Operational deployment to Central Indian Ocean Region: INS Rajput | INS Rajput | 11 October | Colombo, Sri Lanka | |
| Andaman & Nicobar Command | India-Indonesian CORPAT-2018 32nd Edition – Commodore Ashutosh Ridhorkar: INS Kulish – Commander Deepak Bali | INS Kulish | 11 – 27 October | Belawan, Indonesia | |
| Eastern Naval Command | SIMBEX-2018 25th Edition – Rear Admiral Dinesh K Tripathi: INS Ranvijay; INS Satpura; INS Sahyadri; INS Shakti; INS Kirch; INS Kadmatt; INS Sumedha; INS Sukanya; INS Sindhukirti | INS Ranvijay INS Satpura INS Sahyadri INS Shakti INS Kirch INS Kadmatt INS Sumedha INS Sukanya INS Sindhukirti | 10 – 21 November | Port Blair and Visakhapatnam, India | |
| Western Naval Command | Konkan 2018 with Royal Navy: INS Kolkata; Submarine | INS Kolkata | 28 November – 6 December | Goa, India | |

== List of deployments (2022–2025) ==
| Fleet | Deployment | Ships | Date | Port Visited | Notes and References |
|---|---|---|---|---|---|
2022
| Western Naval Command Eastern Naval Command | Maritime exercise | INS Trikand (F51); INS Sumitra | 19–24 November | | 13th edition of Indo-Oman maritime exercise ‘Naseem Al Bahr’ (Sea Breeze) with RNOS Al-Seeb and Al-Shinas. |
2023
| Western Naval Command | Extended range deployment – Commander Divakar S. | INS Vagir | 19 June – 20 August | Port of Colombo, Sri Lanka; Fremantle, Australia | This is the longest ever deployment (7,000 km) for any Indian Submarine or Scorpène-class submarine in a single stretch. |
2024
| Western Naval Command | Friendly visit – Lieutenant Commander Ajith Mohan | INS Kabra | 8 – 10 January | Port of Colombo, Sri Lanka | |
| Western Naval Command | Friendly visit – Commander Arunabh | INS Karanj | 3 – 5 February | Port of Colombo, Sri Lanka | |
| Eastern Naval Command | Operational Deployment of the Eastern fleet to the South China Sea – Rear admiral Rajesh Dhankar | INS Delhi; INS Kiltan; INS Shakti | 6 – 23 May | Singapore; Kota Kinabalu, Malaysia; Cam Ranh Bay, Vietnam; Manila, Philippines; Muara, Brunei | |
| Eastern Naval Command | Operational Deployment of the Eastern fleet to the South China Sea and Northern Pacific Ocean – Rear admiral Rajesh Dhankar | INS Shivalik | 30 May – 20 August | Changi Naval Base, Singapore; Yokosuka, Japan; Hawaii, United States; Guam | Participated in JIMEX 24 and RIMPAC 2024 |
| Southern Naval Command | Foreign EEZ surveillance patrol – Commander Prabhat Ranjan Mishra | INS Sunayna | 15 – 29 June | Port Victoria, Seychelles; Port Louis, Mauritius | |
| Eastern Naval Command | Friendly visit and Passage Exercise (PASSEX) – Commander Prashant Kumar Mishra | INS Kamorta | 20 – 23 June | Port of Trincomalee, Sri Lanka | |
| Eastern Naval Command | Maritime Partnership Exercise with the Bangladesh Navy | INS Ranvir | 29 June | Chattogram, Bangladesh | |
| Western Naval Command | Operational Deployment of the Western fleet to the Africa and Europe – Captain MR Harish | INS Tabar | 27 June – 6 September | Alexandria Port, Egypt; Casablanca, Morocco; Hamburg, Germany; Saint Petersburg, Russia; London, UK; Gothenburg, Sweden; Esbjerg, Denmark; Málaga, Spain; Toulon, France | Participated in Exercise Varuna 2024. |
| Western Naval Command | Friendly visit – Commander Rahul Patnaik | INS Shalki | 2 – 4 August | Port of Colombo, Sri Lanka | |
| Eastern Naval Command | Friendly visit – Captain Sandeep Kumar | INS Mumbai | 26 August | Port of Colombo, Sri Lanka | |
| Western Naval Command | Exercise Kakadu – Captain Ajay Kanwar | Boeing P-8I Neptune (aircraft) | 8 – 20 September | RAAF Base Darwin, Australia | A P-8I aircraft from INAS 316 participated in 16th edition of Exercise Kakadu of Royal Australian Navy. |
| Western Naval Command | Indian Ocean Region deployment – Captain Jithu George | INS Talwar | 22 September – 28 October | Mombasa, Kenya; Simon's Town, South Africa (for Exercise IBSAMAR); Réunion, France | |
| Southern Naval Command | Long Range Training Deployment, Persian Gulf | First Training Squadron: INS Tir (A86); INS Shardul (L16); ICGS Veera (35) | 1–15 October | Bandar Abbas, Iran; Muscat, Oman; Port of Manama, Bahrain (Tir, Veera); Port Rashid, Dubai, UAE (Shardul) | |
| Western Naval Command | Maritime Bilateral Exercise | INS Vikramaditya; INS Visakhapatnam | 5–6 October | Arabian Sea | Bilateral exercise of CSGs India and Italy. Included ITS Cavour and ITS Alpino. |
| Eastern Naval Command | Maritime Multilateral Exercise | INS Delhi, INS Satpura, INS Kamorta, INS Kadmatt, Shishumar-class submarine, INS Shakti. | 13–18 October | Bay of Bengal | Exercise Malabar 2024 with USS Dewey, JS Ariake, HMAS Stuart. |
| Western Naval Command | Maritime Bilateral Exercise | INS Trikand (F51) | 13–18 October | Goa, India | 14th edition of Indo-Oman maritime exercise ‘Naseem Al Bahr’ with RNOS Al-Seeb. |
| Southern Naval Command | Indian Ocean | INS Kalpeni (T75) | 19 October | Port of Colombo, Sri Lanka | Port of Colombo, Sri Lanka |
| Eastern Naval Command | Maritime Bilateral Exercise | INS Shivalik | 25–29 October | Visakhapatnam, India | 31st edition of Singapore India Maritime Bilateral Exercise (SIMBEX) with RSS Tenacious. |
| Western Naval Command | Day at Sea – President of India Droupadi Murmu | 15 frontline warships including: INS Vikrant; 3 Kalvari class; 2 Shishumar class; 1 Sindhughosh-class submarine | 7 November | Goa, India | Carrier operations of MiG-29K, missile firing drills, submarine manoeuvres and flypasts by 30 aircraft. |
| Western Naval Command | Friendly visit – Commander Kapil Kumar | INS Vela | 11–13 November | Port of Colombo, Sri Lanka | |
| Western Naval Command | Operational deployment Europe and Africa – Captain Peter Verghese | INS Tushil | 17 December 2024 – 14 February 2025 | 2024: London, United Kingdom; Casablanca, Morocco; 2025: Port of Dakar, Senegal; Lagos, Nigeria; Durban, South Africa; Port Victoria, Seychelles | |
2025
| Eastern Naval Command | Operational deployment – South Eastern Indian Ocean Region | INS Mumbai | January | Jakarta, Indonesia (18 Jan) | |
| Eastern Naval Command | Operational deployment – South Eastern Indian Ocean Region | INS Sahyadri | 7 April | Port of Colombo, Sri Lanka | |
| Western Naval Command | Operational deployment – Operation Sindoor (CinC: Vice Admiral SJ Singh, Fleet Commander: Rear Admiral Rahul Gokhale) | 36 frontline warships: INS Vikrant (Captain B. S. Bains); 7 Kolkata and Visakhapatnam-class destroyers; 7 frigates (including INS Tushil); 6 submarines | 26 April – 30 May | Northern Arabian Sea | During Operation Sindoor, 36 warships were deployed including an Vikrant-led Carrier Battle Group with 8 to 10 warships. According to the DGNO, the Navy was prepared to strike Pakistan at any time including Karachi. The deployment materialised within 96 hours of 22 April's Pahalgam attack. |
| Western Naval Command | Operational deployment – Gulf of Oman | INS Tabar (F44); A submarine (initially); Boeing P-8I Neptune (initially) | 9 June – early July | Northern Arabian Sea | Joint military exercise with UK CSG 25 on 9 and 10 June. Firefighting operations on Palau-flagged vessel MT Yi Cheng 6 on 29 and 30 June. |
| Western Naval Command | Operational deployment – South Western Indian Ocean Region | INS Teg (F45) | 19 June – early July | Port Louis, Mauritius; Port Victoria, Seychelles | |
| Western Naval Command | Operational deployment Europe and Africa – Captain Sridhar Tata | INS Tamal | 1 July – August end | Port of Casablanca, Morocco; Port of Naples, Italy; Crete Naval Base, Souda Bay, Greece; Jeddah Port, Saudi Arabia | |
| Eastern Naval Command | Operational deployment of the Eastern fleet to the South East Asia – Rear admiral Susheel Menon | INS Delhi (D61); INS Satpura (F48); INS Shakti (A57); INS Kiltan (P30) | Mid-July – mid August | Changi Naval Base, Singapore; Da Nang Port, Vietnam; Port of Manila, Philippines | Satpura participated in the 32nd edition of SIMBEX with the Singapore Armed Forces. The other ships also conducted the maiden joint sail and naval exercise with Philippine Navy. |
| Eastern Naval Command | Hydrographic operation – Captain N Dheeraj | INS Sandhayak | 16 July – mid August | Port Klang, Malaysia; Changi Naval Base, Singapore | |
| Eastern Naval Command | Formal visit to Srik Lanka and SLINEX participation – Captain KP Sreesan and Captain Chetan R Upadhyay | INS Rana (D52); INS Jyoti (A58) | 11 August – August end | Port of Trincomalee, Sri Lanka; Port of Colombo, Sri Lanka | |
| Eastern Naval Command | Operational deployment to the Indo-Pacific | INS Kadmatt (P29) | 20 August – mid September | Surabaya, Indonesia; Port Moresby, Papua New Guinea; Suva, Fiji; Makassar, Indonesia | Conducted and led the mobile Fleet Review flotilla of seven warships from five nations in the occasion of 50th Independence Day of PNG. |
| Western Naval Command | Operational deployment to the Arabian Sea | INS Surat (D69) | 28 August – mid September | Jeddah Port, Saudi Arabia | Conducted PASSEX with ITS Caio Duilio (D554) |
| Western Naval Command | Operational deployment to the Mediterranean Sea — Captain Sachin Kulkarni | INS Trikand (F51) | 1 September – early October | Port of Alexandria, Egypt; Salamis Naval Base, Greece; Evangelos Florakis Naval Base, Limassol, Cyprus; Port of Taranto, Italy | Participated in the 2025 edition of multilateral Exercise Bright Star and the maiden bilateral exercise of Greece and India. |
| Southern Naval Command | Long Range Training Deployment, Persian Gulf — Captain Tijo K Joseph | First Training Squadron: INS Tir (A86); INS Shardul (L16); INS Sujata (P56); ICGS Sarathi | 1 – 21 September | Port Victoria, Seychelles; Maputo, Mozambique; Mombasa, Kenya | |
| Eastern Naval Command | Operational deployment of the Eastern fleet to the South China Sea | INS Nistar (A16); Submarine Rescue Unit (East) | 15 – 23 September | Changi Naval Base, Singapore | Participated in Exercise Pacific Reach 2025 (XPR 25) hosted in the South China Sea. |
| Southern Naval Command | Survey deployment to Mauritius | INS Sutlej (J17) | 29 September – 26 October | Port Louis, Mauritius | |
| Eastern Naval Command | Operational deployment – South China Sea and the Indo-Pacific | INS Sahyadri | 2 October – November end | Kemaman Port, Malaysia; Busan Naval Base, South Korea; Yokosuka Naval Base, Japan; Guam, United States; Manila, Philippines | Participated in the maiden edition of the IN-RoKN Bilateral Exercise with ROKS Gyeongnam. Participated in JAIMEX-25 with JMSDF ships Asahi, Ōmi and submarine Jinryū between 16 and 18 October. Participated in Exercise Malabar 2025 and AusIndEx-25 with HMAS Ballarat. |
| Western Naval Command | Exercise Konkan 2025 | INS Vikrant (R11) (Captain Ashok Rao); INS Kolkata (D63); INS Mormugao (D67); INS Surat (D69); INS Tabar (F44); INS Teg (F45); INS Deepak (A50) | 5–8 October | Arabian Sea | The UK CSG 25 consisted of: HMS Prince of Wales (R09), HMS Richmond (F239), RFA Tidespring (A136), HNoMS Roald Amundsen (F311) of the Norwegian Navy and; JS Akebono (DD-108) of the JMSDF. |
| | Operational deployment – Indian Ocean Region | INS Savitri | 10 November – November end | Port of Beira, Mozambique; Port Victoria, Seychelles | |
| Andaman & Nicobar Command | Operational Turnaround | Three Mk. IV LCU: INLCU 51; INLCU 54; INLCU 57 | 10 – 25 November | Port of Colombo, Sri Lanka | |
| Eastern Naval Command | Navy Week Celebrations | INS Ranvir; INS Satpura; INS Himgiri; INS Udaygiri | 26 November | Port of Chennai | |
| Eastern Naval Command | Navy Week Celebrations | INS Kora; INS Khanjar | 28 – 30 November | Port of Kolkata | |
| Western Naval Command | Sri Lanka Navy International Fleet Review 2025 | INS Vikrant; INS Udaygiri | 27 – 30 November | Port of Colombo, Sri Lanka | |
| | Operation Sagar Bandhu | INS Vikrant (two Chetak helicopters); INS Udaygiri; INS Sukanya; INS Gharial; three Mk. IV LCUs (LCU 51, 54, 57) | 27 November – 8 December | Port of Colombo, Sri Lanka; Trincomalee, Sri Lanka | |

== List of deployments (2026–present) ==
| Fleet | Deployment | Ships | Date | Port Visited | Notes and References |
|---|---|---|---|---|---|
2026
| Southern Naval Command | Long Range Training Deployment, South East Asia — Captain Tijo K Joseph | First Training Squadron: INS Tir (A86); INS Shardul (L16) (until January); INS Sujata (P56); ICGS Sarathi | 15–18 January | Changi Naval Base, Singapore | |
| Southern Naval Command | Long Range Training Deployment, South East Asia — Captain Tijo K Joseph | First Training Squadron: INS Tir (A86); INS Shardul (L16) (until January); INS Sujata (P56); ICGS Sarathi | 20–23 January | Port of Belawan, Indonesia | |
| Southern Naval Command | Long Range Training Deployment, South East Asia — Captain Tijo K Joseph | First Training Squadron: INS Tir (A86); INS Shardul (L16) (until January); INS Sujata (P56); ICGS Sarathi | 25–28 January | Phuket Deep Sea Port, Phuket, Thailand | Conducted Exercise Ayutthaya and Indo–Thai Coordinated Patrol (CORPAT) with the Royal Thai Navy, took over the chairmanship of Indian Ocean Naval Symposium and conducted a Passage Exercisewith HTMS Huahin. |
| Southern Naval Command | Long Range Training Deployment, South East Asia — Captain Tijo K Joseph | First Training Squadron: INS Tir (A86); INS Shardul (L16) (until January); INS Sujata (P56); ICGS Sarathi | 12–15 October | Port Victoria, Seychelles | Conducted a Passage Exercise (PASSEX) with PS Andromache of the Seychelles Coast Guard. |
| Southern Naval Command | Long Range Training Deployment, South East Asia — Captain Tijo K Joseph | First Training Squadron: INS Tir (A86); INS Shardul (L16) (until January); INS Sujata (P56); ICGS Sarathi | 26–29 October | Port of Colombo, Sri Lanka | Conducted a PASSEX with SLNS Nandimithra (P701), a Sa'ar 4-class fast attack craft of the Sri Lanka Navy. |
| Southern Naval Command | Transoceanic expedition Lokyan 26 | INS Sudarshini | 20 January | Kochi | |
| Southern Naval Command | Transoceanic expedition Lokyan 26 | INS Sudarshini | 2 February | Port of Salalah, Oman | |
| Southern Naval Command | Transoceanic expedition Lokyan 26 | INS Sudarshini | 21 February | Safaga, Egypt | |
| Southern Naval Command | Transoceanic expedition Lokyan 26 | INS Sudarshini | 12 March | Valletta, Malta | |
| Southern Naval Command | Transoceanic expedition Lokyan 26 | INS Sudarshini | 26 March–7 April | Sète, France | Participated in the Escale à Sète. |
| Southern Naval Command | Transoceanic expedition Lokyan 26 | INS Sudarshini | 15–18 April | Port of Casablanca, Morocco | |
| Southern Naval Command | Transoceanic expedition Lokyan 26 | INS Sudarshini | 23–26 April | Las Palmas Canary Islands, Spain | |
| Southern Naval Command | Transoceanic expedition Lokyan 26 | INS Sudarshini | 4–8 May | Mindelo, Cape Verde | |
| Southern Naval Command | Transoceanic expedition Lokyan 26 | INS Sudarshini | 27–31 May | Antigua | Reached after the ship completed the maiden trans-Atlantic voyage. |
| Southern Naval Command | Transoceanic expedition Lokyan 26 | INS Sudarshini | 19–23 June | Norfolk, Virginia, United States | Part of Sail250, participated in Parade of Sail and the City Crew Parade. |
| Southern Naval Command | Transoceanic expedition Lokyan 26 | INS Sudarshini | 26 June | Port of Baltimore, Maryland, United States | Part of Sail250, participated in Sail250 Maryland. |
| Southern Naval Command | Transoceanic expedition Lokyan 26 | INS Sudarshini | 4–8 July | Port of New York and New Jersey, United States | Part of Sail250, participated in the United States International Naval Review 250 and Parade of Sail along the Hudson River. |
| Southern Naval Command | Transoceanic expedition Lokyan 26 | INS Sudarshini | 12–25 July | Boston Fishing Pier, Boston, United States | Part of Sail250, participated in the Grand Parade of Sails. |
| Southern Naval Command | Transoceanic expedition Lokyan 26 | INS Sudarshini | 13–16 August | Ponta Delgada, Azores, Portugal | |
| Southern Naval Command | Transoceanic expedition Lokyan 26 | INS Sudarshini | 22–25 August | Port of Lisbon, Portugal | Indian cadets visited the Portuguese Naval Academy. |
| Southern Naval Command | Transoceanic expedition Lokyan 26 | INS Sudarshini | 1–6 September | Port of Barcelona, Spain | |
| Southern Naval Command | Transoceanic expedition Lokyan 26 | INS Sudarshini | 9–12 September | Port of Livorno, Italy | Admiral Giuseppe Berutti Bergotto, the Chief of Staff of the Italian Navy, boarded the ship during the visit. Indian cadets visited ITS Virginio Fasan (F 591) and the Italian Naval Academy. |
| Southern Naval Command | Transoceanic expedition Lokyan 26 | INS Sudarshini | 23 September | Alexandria Port, Egypt | Second port call of Sudarshini to Egypt in 10 months. |
| Southern Naval Command | Transoceanic expedition Lokyan 26 | INS Sudarshini | 14–17 October | Port of Salalah, Oman | |
| Western Naval Command | Operation Urja Suraksha — Gulf of Oman | INS Surat (D69) | February – June | Bahrain | Deployment amid 2026 Iran war. Might be deployed to escort Indian-flagged vessels from the crisis-hit Strait of Hormuz. |
| Western Naval Command | Operation Urja Suraksha — Gulf of Aden | Unknown Talwar-class frigate | February – June | | Deployment amid 2026 Iran war. Might be deployed to escort Indian-flagged vessels from the crisis-hit Strait of Hormuz. |
| Western Naval Command | South West Indian Ocean: Exercise LAMITIYE-2026 | INS Trikand (F51) | 10 – 13 March | Port Louis, Mauritius | The marching contingent and integral helicopter took part in the Mauritius National Day celebrations. Trikand also undertook a PASSEX and EEZ surveillance with CGS Valiant after departure. |
| Western Naval Command | South West Indian Ocean: Exercise LAMITIYE-2026 | INS Trikand (F51) | 16 – 20 March | Port Victoria, Seychelles | First tri-service edition of Exercise LAMITIYE. Personnel from the Assam Regiment of the Indian Army and a C-130J of the Indian Air Force were also present. |
| Western Naval Command | South West Indian Ocean: Exercise LAMITIYE-2026 | INS Trikand (F51) | 26 March | Maputo, Mozambique | |
| Western Naval Command | South West Indian Ocean: Exercise LAMITIYE-2026 | INS Trikand (F51) | 3 April | Dar-es-Salaam, Tanzania | The crew will engage in professional interactions and joint training activities with the Tanzania Navy. |
| Western Naval Command | South West Indian Ocean: Exercise LAMITIYE-2026 | INS Trikand (F51) | 7 – 10 April | Mombasa Port, Kenya | |
| Eastern Naval Command | Western Pacific Ocean | INS Nilgiri (F33) | | Sydney Harbour, Australia | Participated in the Royal Australian Navy's multilateral naval exercise Kakadu 2026. |
| Southern Naval Command | Indian Ocean | INS Nireekshak (A15) | 21 – 27 April | Port of Colombo, Sri Lanka | Participated in the fourth edition of IN-SLN DIVEX 2026 with the Sri Lanka Navy. |
| Southern Naval Command | Indian Ocean | INS Kalpeni (T75) | 25 April | Gan, Addu Atoll, Maldives | |
| Eastern Naval Command | Indian Ocean | INS Sindhukesari (S60) | 3 May | Port of Colombo, Sri Lanka | |
| Southern Naval Command | Indian Ocean | INS Sharda (P55) | 8 May | Off the coast of Kochi | Conducted PASSEX with HNLMS De Ruyter (F804). |
| Southern Naval Command | Indian Ocean | INS Sharda (P55) | 13 June | Port of Colombo, Sri Lanka | |
| Western Naval Command | South West Indian Ocean — Captain Rohit Mishra (Tarkash) | INS Tarkash (F50); INS Ikshak (J23) (for Seychelles) | 12 – 15 June | Port Victoria, Seychelles | Escorted PS Zoroaster of the Seychelles Coast Guard from shipyard of the GRSE, Kolkata to her home port after her second refit. |
| Western Naval Command | South West Indian Ocean — Captain Rohit Mishra (Tarkash) | INS Tarkash (F50); INS Ikshak (J23) (for Seychelles) | 20 – 22 June | Port Louis, Mauritius | |
| Western Naval Command | South West Indian Ocean — Captain Rohit Mishra (Tarkash) | INS Tarkash (F50); INS Ikshak (J23) (for Seychelles) | 26 – 29 June | Port Victoria, Seychelles | Participated in the 50th National Day celebrations of Seychelles. |
| Western Naval Command | South West Indian Ocean — Captain Rohit Mishra (Tarkash) | INS Tarkash (F50); INS Ikshak (J23) (for Seychelles) | 30 September – 3 October | Port of Mombasa, Kenya | Conducted a passage exercise with KNS Jasiri (P3124) of the Kenya Navy. |
| Western Naval Command | South West Indian Ocean — Captain Rohit Mishra (Tarkash) | INS Tarkash (F50); INS Ikshak (J23) (for Seychelles) | 8 – 21 October | Simon’s Town and False Bay, South Africa | Participation in IBSAMAR 2026. |
| Western Naval Command | South West Indian Ocean — Captain Rohit Mishra (Tarkash) | INS Tarkash (F50); INS Ikshak (J23) (for Seychelles) | 30 October – 3 November | Port Louis, Mauritius | Participation in the 192nd Aapravasi Diwas on 2 November and conduced PASSEX with CGS Valiant of the Mauritius Coast Guard. |
| Eastern Naval Command | South East Indian Ocean — Rear Admiral Alok Ananda (FOCEF) | INS Udaygiri (F35); INS Kavaratti (P31); INS Shakti (A57) (joined 27 June) | 22 – 24 June | Nha Rong Port, Ho Chi Minh City, Vietnam | |
| Eastern Naval Command | South East Indian Ocean — Rear Admiral Alok Ananda (FOCEF) | INS Udaygiri (F35); INS Kavaratti (P31); INS Shakti (A57) (joined 27 June) | 27 – 29 June | Sattahip Naval Base, Thailand | |
| Eastern Naval Command | South East Indian Ocean — Rear Admiral Alok Ananda (FOCEF) | INS Udaygiri (F35); INS Kavaratti (P31); INS Shakti (A57) (joined 27 June) | 1 July | Changi Naval Base, Singapore | |
| Eastern Naval Command | South East Indian Ocean | INS Mysore (D60) | 9 – 12 September | Lumut Naval Base, Malaysia | |
| Eastern Naval Command | South East Indian Ocean | INS Kulish (P63) | 12 September | Ream Naval Base, Cambodia | |
| Eastern Naval Command | South East Indian Ocean | INS Kulish (P63) | 20 September – 3 October | Subic Bay, Philippines | Participation in ASEAN Defence Ministers’ Meeting (ADMM)-Plus Joint Cooperation Activity (JCA). |
| Eastern Naval Command | South East Indian Ocean | INS Kulish (P63) | 8 October | Tuas Terminal, Singapore | |
| Eastern Naval Command | Indian Ocean and Pacific Ocean — Captain Vikas Jha | INS Sahyadri (F49) | 20 September – 3 October | Subic Bay, Philippines | Participation in ASEAN Defence Ministers’ Meeting (ADMM)-Plus Joint Cooperation Activity (JCA). |
| Eastern Naval Command | Indian Ocean and Pacific Ocean — Captain Vikas Jha | INS Sahyadri (F49) | 10 – 18 October | Vladivostok, Russia | Participation in Exercise INDRA with Russian Navy from 13 to 18 October. |
| Eastern Naval Command | Indian Ocean and Pacific Ocean — Captain Vikas Jha | INS Sahyadri (F49) | 26 – 29 October | Busan Naval Base, South Korea | Participated in the second edition of the IN-RoKN Bilateral Exercise with ROKS Munmu the Great (DDH-976). |
| Eastern Naval Command | Indian Ocean and Pacific Ocean — Captain Vikas Jha | INS Sahyadri (F49) | 4 – 12 November | Yokosuka Naval Base, Japan | Participation in Exercise Malabar 2026. |
| Western Naval Command | Mediterranean Sea | INS Trishul (F43) | 14 – 17 September | Alexandria Port, Egypt | Trishul was escorted to port by ENS Al-Qadeer of the Egyptian Navy and the visit concuded with a Passage Exercise (PASSEX) with ENS Bernees. |
| Western Naval Command | Mediterranean Sea | INS Trishul (F43) | 22 September | Toulon, France | Trishul will participate in the 24th edition of Exercise Varuna. |
| Western Naval Command | Mediterranean Sea | INS Trishul (F43) | 30 September | Port of Valencia, Spain | |
| Western Naval Command | Mediterranean Sea | INS Trishul (F43) | 8 – 15 October | Plymouth, United Kingdom | Participation in Konkan 2026 with Royal Navy in two phases with HMS Sutherland (F81). |
| Western Naval Command | Mediterranean Sea | INS Trishul (F43) | 25 – 28 October | Port of Civitavecchia, Italy | Conducted PASSEX with ITS Carlo Margottini (F 592). |
| Eastern Naval Command | SLINEX | INS Kavaratti (P31); INS Jyoti (A58) | 17 – 21 September | Visakhapatnam Port, India | The Sri Lanka Navy deployed SLNS Sindurala (P624). |
| Eastern Naval Command | SIMBEX | INS Nilgiri (F33); INS Kamorta (P28) | 21 – 26 October | Visakhapatnam Port, India | The Republic of Singapore Navy deployed RSS Supreme. The air assets deployed in the exercise included an SH-70B helicopter with Supreme along with P-8I Neptune, Do-228 MPA, Hawk 132 and MH-60R helicopters of the Indian Naval Air Arm. |

== See also ==
- List of exercises of the Indian Army
- List of exercises of the Indian Air Force
- Exercise TROPEX
