= INS Tarasa =

The following ships of the Indian Navy have been named INS Tarasa:

- INS Tarasa (T63) is a Trinkat-class patrol vessel commissioned in 2001 and transferred to the Seychelles Coast Guard as PS Constant in 2014
- INS Tarasa (T94) is a Car Nicobar-class patrol vessel commissioned in 2017
