= INS Baratang =

Indian Navy patrol vessel

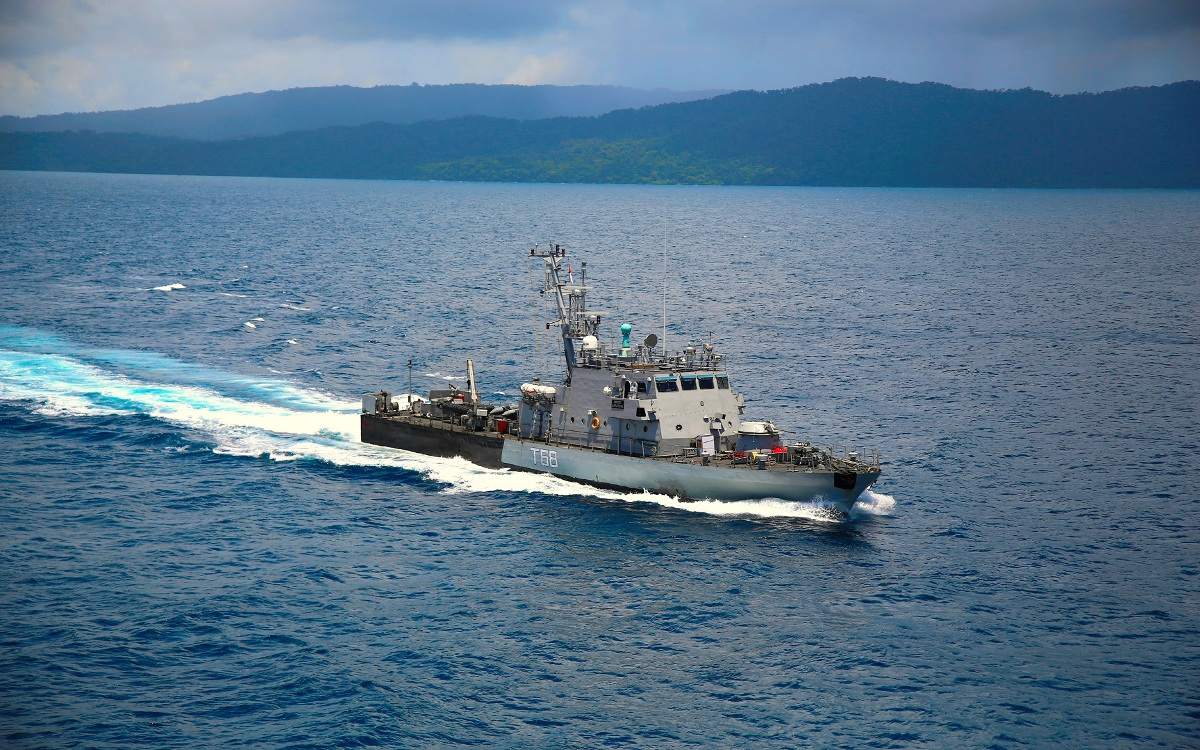
- INS Baratang (T68) during Milan 2018

History
- Name: INS Baratang
- Operator: Indian Navy
- Builder: Garden Reach Shipbuilders and Engineers
- Identification: T68

General characteristics
- Class & type: Bangaram-class patrol vessel
- Displacement: 260 tons (full load)
- Length: 46 m (151 ft)
- Beam: 7.5 m (25 ft)
- Propulsion: 2 × MTU 4000 M90 engines (7492hp)
- Speed: 30 knots (56 km/h)
- Complement: 33
- Armament: 1 × CRN-91 (2A42 Medak) 30mm gun

INS Baratang (T68) is the fourth and final Bangaram-class patrol vessel of the Indian Navy. It is designed for interdiction against fast moving surface vessels and for search-and-rescue operations in coastal areas and in the exclusive economic zone. Named after Baratang in the Andaman Islands, the vessel was designed and built by Garden Reach Shipbuilders and Engineers.

Like the other ships of the class this ship has an air-conditioning system supplied by ABB, switchboards from GEPC, diesel generator sets from Cummins India, living spaces designed by Godrej Group as well as a built-in RO (Reverse Osmosis) plant. The electronic equipment on board including satellite communication and global positioning systems is from Bharat Electronics Limited, ECIL and Hindustan Aeronautics Limited.

== Operations ==
In 2011, the ship, as part of its anti-piracy patrol, apprehended nine poachers from Myanmar in the Andaman Sea. In August 2014, Baratang was involved in the rescue of fishing vessel MFV Matha with 11 crew members on board. In 2014, the ship also visited Phuket as part of a joint naval exercise with Royal Thai Navy corvette HTMS Thayanchon alongside two Dornier 228 aircraft.

She participated at the International Fleet Review 2026 held at Visakapatanam.
