= INS Bangaram =

Indian patrol vessel

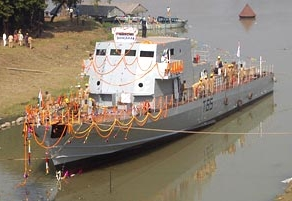
- INS Bangaram (T65) at the time of launching

History
- Name: INS Bangaram
- Namesake: Bangaram Atoll
- Operator: Indian Navy
- Builder: Garden Reach Shipbuilders and Engineers
- Commissioned: 10 February 2006
- Identification: T65

General characteristics
- Type: Fast attack craft
- Displacement: 260 tons (full load)
- Length: 46 m (151 ft)
- Beam: 7.5 m (25 ft)
- Propulsion: 2 × MTU 4000 M90 engines (7492hp)
- Speed: 30 knots (56 km/h)
- Complement: 33
- Armament: 1 × CRN-91 (2A42 Medak) 30mm gun

INS Bangaram (T65) the lead ship of her class of the Indian Navy is designed for interdiction against fast moving surface vessels and for search-and-rescue operations in coastal areas and in the exclusive economic zone. Named after Bangaram in Lakshadweep, the vessel was designed and built by Garden Reach Shipbuilders and Engineers.

Like the other ships of the class this ship has an air-conditioning system supplied by ABB, switchboards from GEPC, diesel generator sets from Cummins India, living spaces designed by Godrej Group as well as a built-in RO (Reverse Osmosis) plant. The electronic equipment on board including satellite communication and global positioning systems is from Bharat Electronics Limited, ECIL and Hindustan Aeronautics Limited.

== Operations ==
In Dec 2016 INS Bangaram was operationally deployed in the rescue of 800 tourist alongside INS Bitra, INS Kumbhir (L22) and LCU 38 from the Havelock Island and ferried them to Port Blair as a result of severe cyclonic storm in the Bay of Bengal.

In Mar 2017 the warship alongside INS Karmuk (P64) visited Yangon in Myanmar to take part in the 5th Indo-Myanmar coordinated patrol CORPAT.
