= Bangaram-class fast attack craft =

2006 Indian naval class

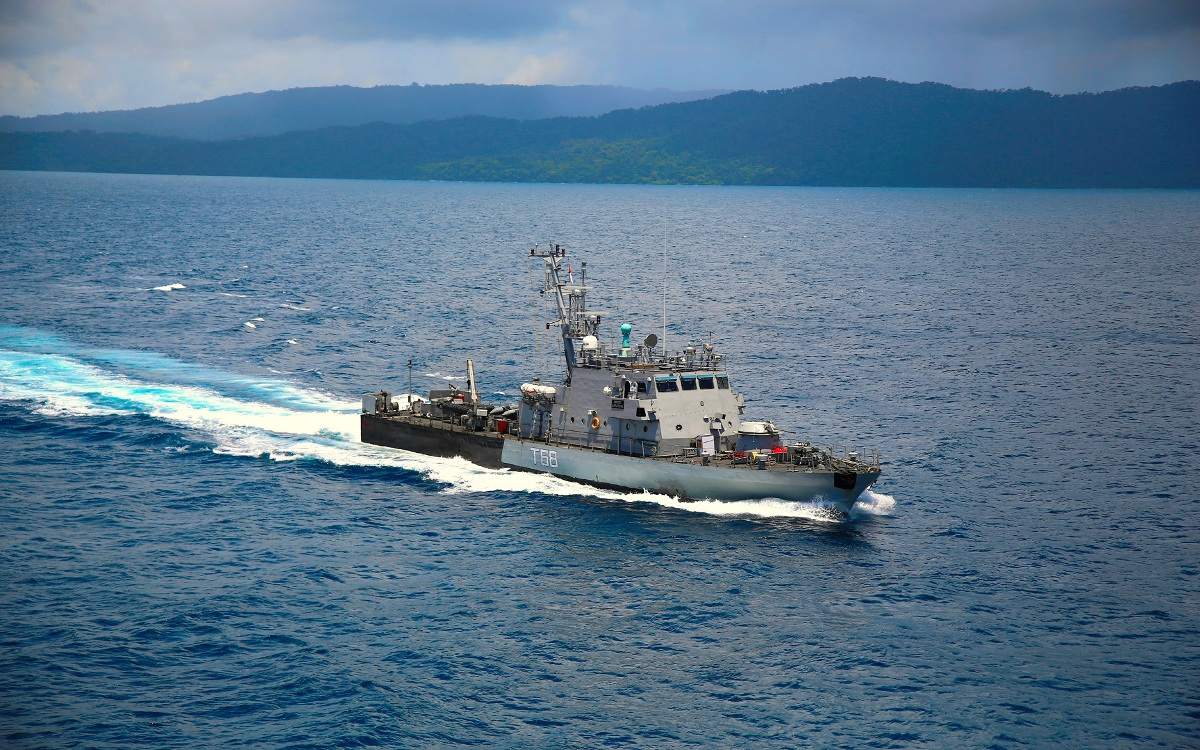
- INS Baratang (T68) during Milan 2018

Class overview
- Name: Bangaram class
- Builders: Garden Reach Shipbuilders and Engineers
- Operators: Indian Navy
- Preceded by: Trinkat class
- Succeeded by: Car Nicobar class
- Built: 2004-2006
- In commission: 2006-present
- Planned: 4
- Completed: 4
- Canceled: 0
- Active: 4

General characteristics
- Type: Fast attack craft
- Displacement: 260 tons (full load)
- Length: 46 m (151 ft)
- Beam: 7.5 m (25 ft)
- Propulsion: 2 × MTU 4000 M90 engines (7492hp)
- Speed: 30 knots (56 km/h)
- Complement: 33
- Armament: 1 × CRN-91 (2A42 Medak) 30mm gun

The Bangaram-class fast attack crafts of the Indian Navy are designed for interdiction against fast moving surface vessels and for search-and-rescue operations in coastal areas and in the exclusive economic zone. They are named after Bangaram in Lakshadweep and forms a part of the Naval Component of the Andaman and Nicobar Command.

The vessels are designed and built by Garden Reach Shipbuilders and Engineers. The ships of the class have an air-conditioning system supplied by ABB, switchboards from GEPC, diesel generator sets from Cummins India, living spaces designed by Godrej Group as well as a built-in RO (Reverse Osmosis) plant. The electronic equipment on board including satellite communication and global positioning systems is from Bharat Electronics Limited, ECIL and Hindustan Aeronautics Limited.

== Ships of the class ==
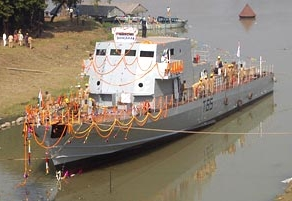
INS Bangaram (T65) at the time of launching.

Name	Pennant	Launched	Commissioned	Status	Homeport
Indian Navy
Bangaram	T65	11 December 2004	10 February 2006	Active	Sri Vijaya Puram
Bitra	T66	14 December 2004	28 March 2006	Active	Sri Vijaya Puram
Batti Malv	T67	28 June 2005	31 July 2006	Active	Sri Vijaya Puram
Baratang	T68	6 August 2005	12 September 2006	Active	Sri Vijaya Puram

== See also ==
- List of active Indian Navy ships
