= INS Batti Malv =

Indian patrol vessel

History
- Name: INS Batti Malv
- Operator: Indian Navy
- Builder: Garden Reach Shipbuilders and Engineers
- Commissioned: 31 July 2006
- Identification: T67

General characteristics
- Class & type: Bangaram-class fast attack craft
- Displacement: 260 tons (full load)
- Length: 46 m (151 ft)
- Beam: 7.5 m (25 ft)
- Propulsion: 2 × MTU 4000 M90 engines (7492hp)
- Speed: 30 knots (56 km/h)
- Complement: 33
- Armament: 1 × CRN-91 (2A42 Medak) 30mm gun

INS Batti Malv (T67) is the third ship of the Bangaram-class fast attack craft of the Indian Navy, designed for interdiction against fast moving surface vessels and for search-and-rescue operations in coastal areas and in the exclusive economic zone. Named after the Battimalv Island in Nicobar, the vessel was designed and built by Garden Reach Shipbuilders and Engineers.

Like the other ships of the class this ship has an air-conditioning system supplied by ABB, switchboards from GEPC, diesel generator sets from Cummins India, living spaces designed by Godrej Group as well as a built-in RO (Reverse Osmosis) plant. The electronic equipment on board including satellite communication and global positioning systems is from Bharat Electronics Limited, ECIL and Hindustan Aeronautics Limited.

The ship was launched on 28 June 2005 for patrolling operations along the coast of Andaman Islands and was commissioned 31 July 2006 by Vice Admiral Arun Kumar Singh at Port Blair.

== Operations ==
The ship's maiden assingnment was when she took part in a training exercise with Royal Thai Navy in 2009 off Phuket island. In April 2010 INS Batti Malv took part in the Indo Singaporean naval exercise SIMBEX alongside Indian Navy's other ships namely INS Mahish (L19) (Landing Ship Tank), INS Ranvir (Destroyer), INS Jyoti (Tanker) as well as a submarine from the Eastern Naval Command, in addition to fixed wing and rotary wing aircraft. In March 2011 the warship apprehended three boats with 23 Myanmar poachers off Interview Island during routine patrol along the western side of Andaman and Nicobar islands.

In 2014 the ship alongside INS Satpura, INS Sahyadri, INS Saryu was pressed into search for the missing Malaysia Airlines Flight 370 alongside other international navies. The plane which was on its way to Beijing had disappeared over the Indian Ocean.In the 2016 Indian Air Force An-32 disappearance where the aircraft still remains missing; 8 members of the 29 on board were technicians who were going to Port Blair to undertake some repair work on the CRN-91 weapon system mounted on INS Batti Malv. She participated at the International Fleet Review 2026 held at Visakapatanam in February 2026.
