= INS Sharda =

Indian navy patrol vessel

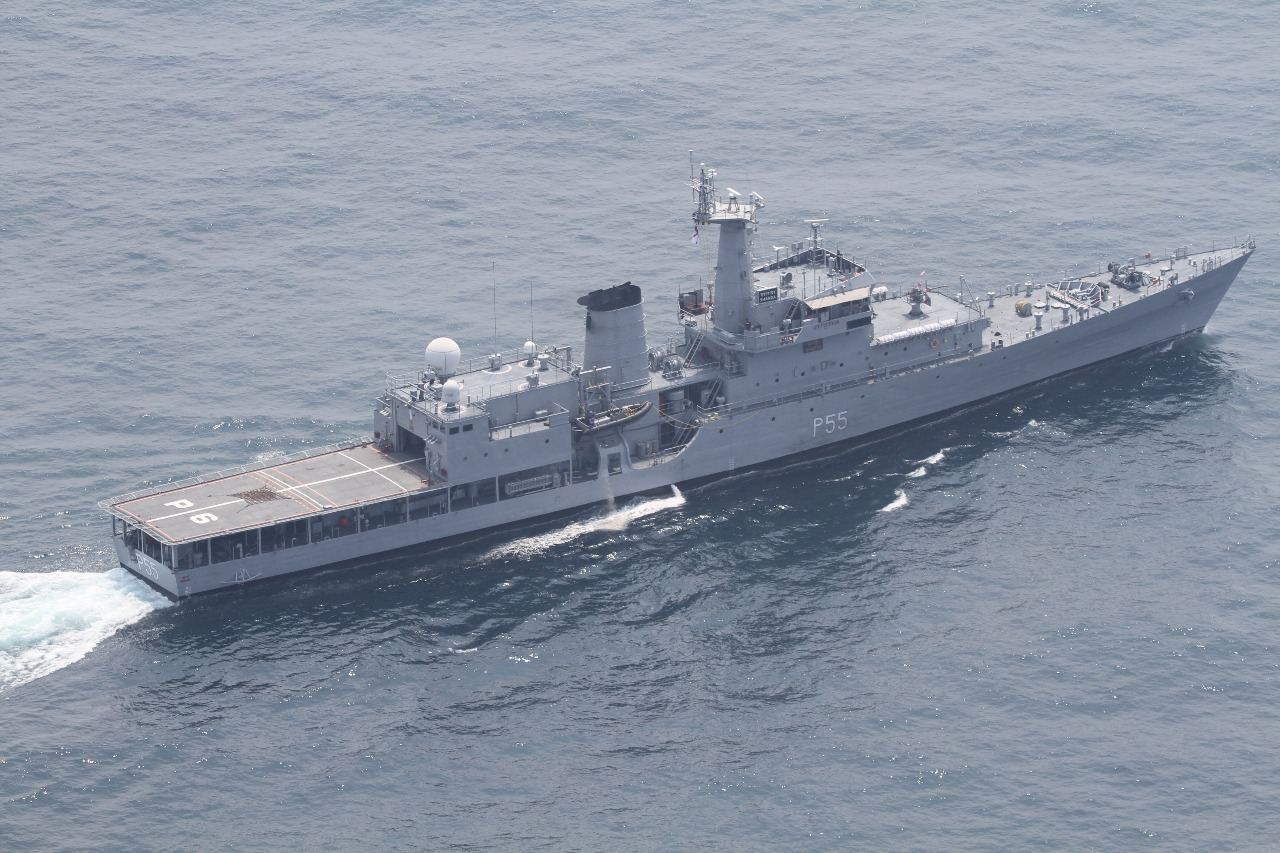
- INS Sharda sailing between Androth and Agatti Island

History

India
- Name: Sharda
- Builder: Hindustan Shipyard Limited
- Launched: 22 August 1990
- Commissioned: 27 October 1991
- Status: Active

General characteristics
- Class & type: Sukanya-class patrol vessel
- Displacement: 1,890 tons (full load)
- Length: 101 m (331 ft 4 in)
- Beam: 11.5 m (37 ft 9 in)
- Propulsion: 2 × diesel engines, 12,800 bhp (9,540 kW), 2 shafts
- Speed: 21 knots (39 km/h)
- Range: 7,000 nautical miles (13,000 km) at 15 knots (28 km/h)
- Complement: 70
- Sensors & processing systems: 1 × Racal Decca 2459 search radar; 1 BEL 1245 navigation radar
- Armament: 1 × 40 mm, 60 cal. Bofors anti-aircraft gun; 2 × 12.7 mm machine guns; 2 x 25 mm, 80 cal. anti-aircraft guns
- Aircraft carried: 1 HAL Chetak

INS Sharda (P55) is a Sukanya-class patrol vessel of the Indian Navy.

== Operations ==
On 17 May 2017, the ship rescued a Liberian registered merchant vessel, MV Mountbatten, from pirates while on patrol in the Gulf of Aden.

=== 2024 Anti-piracy patrols ===
On 2 February 2024, Shardha thwarted another piracy attempt off the Somali coast and rescued an Iranian-flagged fishing vessel (FV) and its crew of 11 Iranians and 8 Pakistanis. Indian Navy's remotely piloted aircraft located FV 'Omari', and Sharda, deployed for an anti-piracy mission in the region, was diverted to intercept the boat. Omari had been boarded by seven pirates who had taken the crew as hostages using her integral helicopter and boats, the ship coerced the pirates for safe release of crew along with the vessel.

On 6 April 2024, the Chief of the Naval Staff, Admiral R. Hari Kumar, awarded 'On the Spot Unit Citation' to Sharda for its anti piracy operation off the Eastern coast of Somalia on 2 February 2024.

=== 2025–present ===
The ship participated in the eighth edition of Exercise Ekatha, an annual bilateral eercise between the Indian Navy and Maldives National Defence Force (MNDF), which was conducted between November and December 2025 for 30 days until 16 December. The exercise included MARCOS and MNDF Marine Corps. The closing ceremony held at MNDF Central Area Command, Kadhdhoo, was attended by the Deputy Chief of the Naval Staff, Vice Admiral Tarun Sobti.

She participated in a Passage Exercise (PASSEX) with the visiting HNLMS De Ruyter (F804), a De Zeven Provinciën-class frigate of the Royal Netherlands Navy, on 8 May 2026. De Ruyter had called at the Port of Kochi from 6 May during her deployment in the Indo-Pacific. The PASSEX, which was held during the departure of the frigate included interoperability drills, tactical manoeuvres, communication drills, flying operations and a traditional steam past for concludion.

The ship docked at the Port of Colombo, Sri Lanka from where she departed on 13 June 2026.
