= INS Sujata =

Navy Patrol Ship presently operating as Officers Training Ship

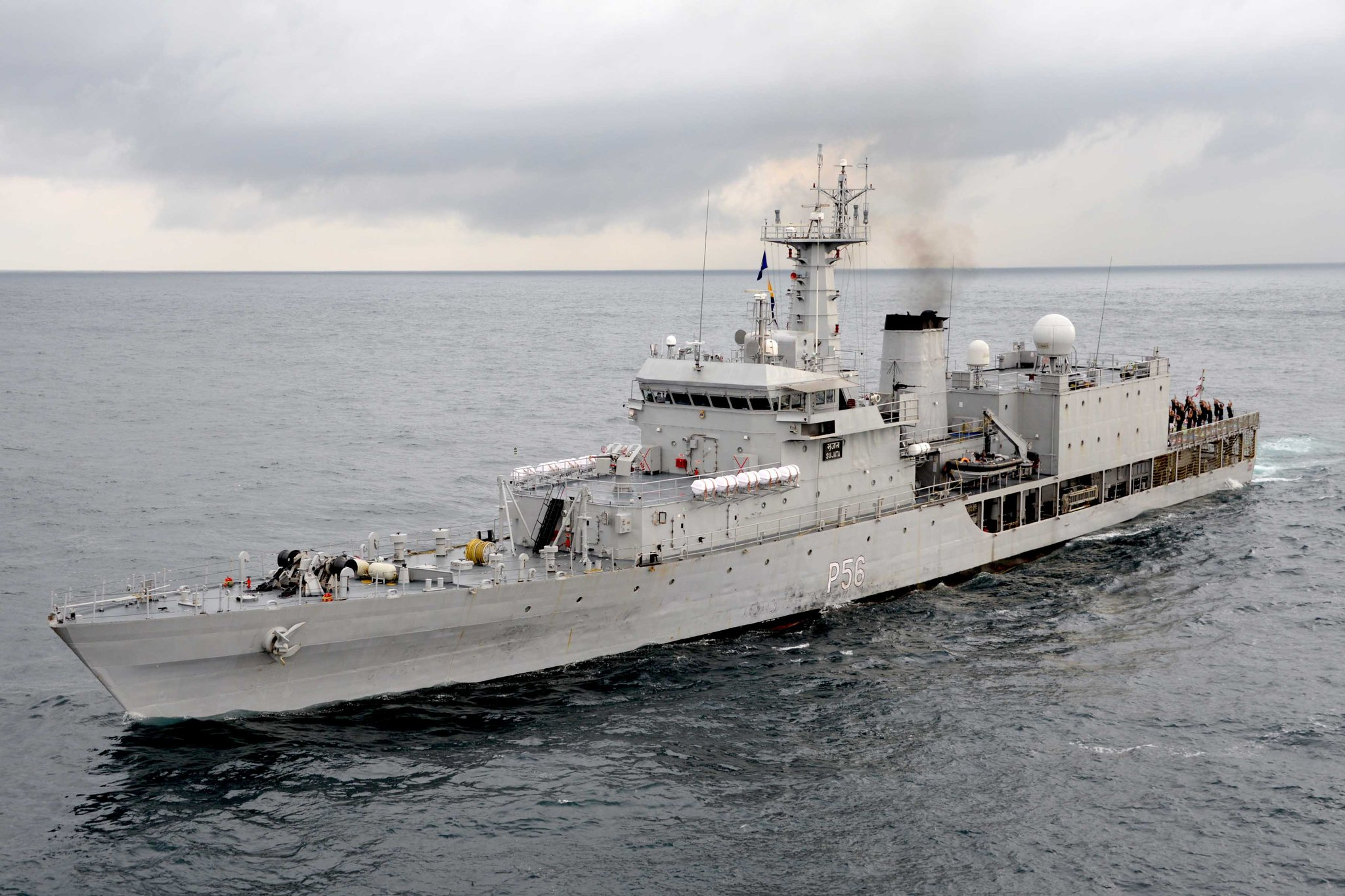
- INS Sujata (P56) en-route to Sri Lanka.

History
- Name: INS Sujata
- Launched: 25 October 1991
- Commissioned: 3 November 1993
- Status: Active

General characteristics
- Class & type: Sukanya class patrol vessel
- Displacement: 1,890 tons (full load)
- Length: 101 metres
- Beam: 11.5 metres
- Propulsion: 2 × diesel engines, 12,800 bhp (9,540 kW), 2 shafts
- Speed: 21 knots (39 km/h)
- Range: 7,000 nautical miles (13,000 km) at 15 knots (28 km/h)
- Complement: 70
- Sensors & processing systems: 1 × Racal Decca 2459 search radar; 1 BEL 1245 navigation radar
- Armament: 1 × 40 mm, 60-cal Bofors anti-aircraft gun; 2 × 12.7 mm machine guns; P51 added: 1 Dhanush ballistic missile; P55 added: 2 x 25 mm, 80-cal anti-aircraft guns
- Aircraft carried: 1 HAL Chetak

INS Sujata (P56) is a Sukanya class patrol vessel of the Indian Navy.

== Service history ==
=== 2025 Kerala oil spill ===
INS Sujata, ICGS Arnvesh and ICGS Saksham were instrumental in the rescue of 24 crew members and containment of an oil spill from the container vessel MSC Elsa 3 off the Coast of Kochi. Despite the crews best efforts, the ship capsized and sank into the Arabian sea on 25 May 2025.

=== Long-range deployment in 2025 ===
On 1 September 2025, INS Tir, INS Shardul and ICGS Sarathi (18), as part of the 1st Training Squadron (1TS), reached Port Victoria, Seychelles on a long-range deployment to the South Western Indian Ocean Region. The visit included professional interaction with the crew of ESPS Navarra (F85) of the Spanish Navy who also visited the country during the period. The squadron departed the port on 4 September. On 16 September, the squadron, led by Captain Tijo K Joseph and joined by INS Sujata (P56), reached Maputo, Mozambique, for a four-day visit. The visit included bilateral exercises with the Mozambique Navy as well as visit of 1TS trainees to various training establishments of the Mozambique Defence Forces. The visit will conclude with a PASSEX and joint surveillance of Mozambique EEZ. The squadron also visited La Réunion during the deployment. On 25 September, the ships called at the Mombasa, Kenya. On 28 September, the fleet departed and conducted PASSEX with KNS Shupavu (P3130) of the Kenya Navy.

=== Long-range deployment in 2026 ===
INS Tir, INS Shardul, INS Sujata and ICGS Sarathi were deployed on a long-range training deployment (LRTD) to the South East Asia to train officer cadets from 110th Integrated Officers’ Training Course (IOTC). As part of the deployment, the squadron would take port calls at Singapore, Indonesia and Thailand. The course includes six international officer trainees. The deployment will also include officers from the Indian Army and the Indian Air Force.

On 15 January, the squadron called at Changi Naval Base, Singapore. Meanwhile, 2026 the has been designated ASEAN–India Year of Maritime Cooperation 2026. The Navy held harbour activities with the Republic of Singapore Navy. The Senior Officer 1TS and Commanding Officers visited the Commander of Maritime Training and Doctrine Command (MTDC). The ships departed Singapore on 18 January.

On 20 January, the ships reached Port of Belawan, Indonesia. They departed the port on 23 January.

On 25 January, the ships reached Phuket Deep Sea Port, Phuket, Thailand. Indian Navy regularly conducts Exercise Ayutthaya and Indo–Thai Coordinated Patrol (CORPAT) with the Royal Thai Navy. India will also take over the chairmanship of Indian Ocean Naval Symposium from Thailand starting February 2026. The visit concluded on 28 January as the ships left the port along with HTMS Huahin for a Passage Exercise (PASSEX).

On 18 February, the ships also participated at the International Fleet Review 2026 held at Visakapatanam.
