= INS Savitri =

Sukanya class patrol vessel of the Indian Navy

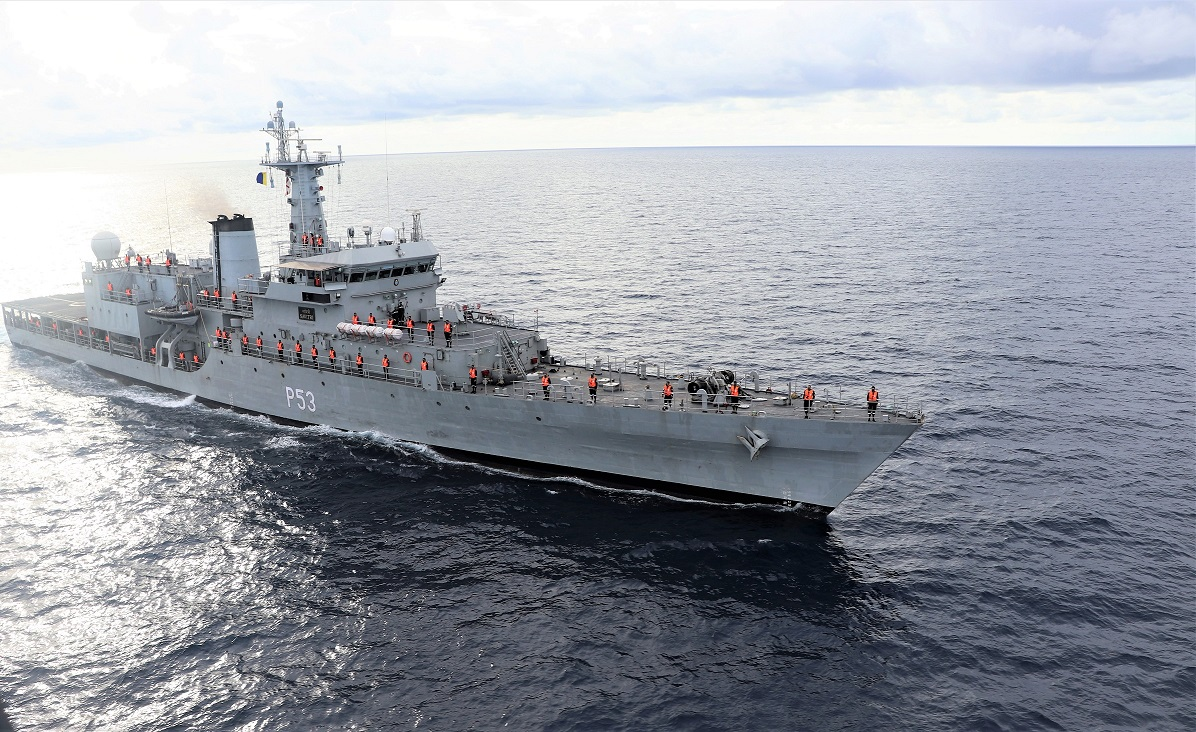
- INS Savitri during sea deployment

History
- Name: INS Savitri
- Builder: Mazagon Dock Limited
- Launched: 23 May 1989
- Commissioned: 27 November 1990
- Status: Active

General characteristics
- Class & type: Sukanya class patrol vessel
- Displacement: 1,890 tons (full load)
- Length: 101 metres
- Beam: 11.5 metres
- Propulsion: 2 × diesel engines, 12,800 bhp (9,540 kW), 2 shafts
- Speed: 21 knots (39 km/h)
- Range: 7,000 nautical miles (13,000 km) at 15 knots (28 km/h)
- Complement: 70
- Sensors & processing systems: 1 × Racal Decca 2459 search radar; 1 BEL 1245 navigation radar
- Armament: 1 × 40 mm, 60-cal Bofors anti-aircraft gun; 2 × 12.7 mm machine guns
- Aircraft carried: 1 HAL Chetak

INS Savitri (P53) is a Sukanya class patrol vessel of the Indian Navy. She participated at the International Fleet Review 2026 held at Visakapatanam.
