= INS Bitra =

Indian patrol vessel

History
- Name: INS Bitra
- Operator: Indian Navy
- Builder: Garden Reach Shipbuilders and Engineers
- Commissioned: 28 March 2006
- Identification: T66
- Status: Active

General characteristics
- Type: Fast attack craft
- Displacement: 260 tons (full load)
- Length: 46 m (151 ft)
- Beam: 7.5 m (25 ft)
- Propulsion: 2 × MTU 4000 M90 engines (7492hp)
- Speed: 30 knots (56 km/h)
- Complement: 33
- Armament: 1 × CRN-91 (2A42 Medak) 30mm gun

INS Bitra (T66), the second ship of Bangaram-class fast attack craft of the Indian Navy, is designed for interdiction against fast moving surface vessels and for search-and-rescue operations in coastal areas and in the exclusive economic zone. Named after Bitra atoll in Lakshadweep, the vessel was designed and built by Garden Reach Shipbuilders and Engineers.

Like the other ships of the class this ship has an air-conditioning system supplied by ABB, switchboards from GEPC, diesel generator sets from Cummins India, living spaces designed by Godrej Group as well as a built-in RO (Reverse Osmosis) plant. The electronic equipment on board including satellite communication and global positioning systems is from Bharat Electronics Limited, ECIL and Hindustan Aeronautics Limited.

Rear Admiral Sanjay Vadgaokar commissioned the fast attack ship in Vasco da Gama, Goa on 28 March 2006.

== Operations ==
In December 2016 INS Bitra was operationally deployed to rescue 800 tourists together with INS Bangaram, INS Kumbhir (L22) and LCU 38 from Havelock Island and ferry them to Port Blair as a result of a severe cyclonic storm in the Bay of Bengal.

In February 2016 together with INS Saryu visited Yangon in Myanmar on an official port visit.
