= INS Kabra =

Indian patrol vessel

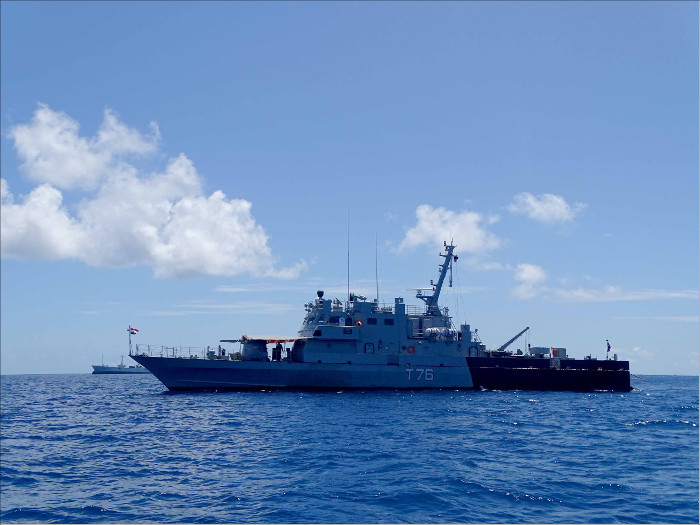

General characteristics
- Class & type: Car Nicobar-class fast attack craft
- Type: Fast Attack Craft
- Displacement: 320 tons
- Length: 49 m
- Beam: 7.5
- Propulsion: 3 water jet propulsion engines producing 11,238 hp
- Speed: 35+ knots
- Range: 2,000 miles @ 12-14 knots
- Crew: 3 officers and 39 sailors
- Armament: 1 × CRN-91 30mm autocannon; Igla SA-18 SAM; 2 × 12.7mm HMGs; ASW capability

INS Kabra is the eighth ship of the series of ten Fleet I Car Nicobar-class fast attack craft built by Garden Reach Shipbuilders and Engineers (GRSE) for the Indian Navy. It is named after an island of the Andaman and Nicobar archipelago. The vessels are designed as a cost-effective platform for high-speed offshore patrol, anti-piracy and rescue operations in India's Exclusive Economic Zone.

The class and its vessels are named for Indian islands. They are the first water jet propelled vessels of the Indian Navy.

INS Kabra was commissioned by Vice Admiral K.N. Sushil, Flag Officer Commanding-in-Chief of the Southern Naval Command, at the Kochi naval base on 8 June 2011.

== Design ==
The Car Nicobar class vessels were designed and built by GRSE. Production of the class was fast-tracked after the 2008 Mumbai attacks. The vessels feature improved habitability with fully air-conditioned modular accommodation, on board reverse osmosis plant for desalination, and a sewage treatment plant.

The vessels are each powered by three HamiltonJet HM811 water jets, coupled with MTU 16V 4000 M90 engines, delivering a combined 8160 KW of power. An aluminum superstructure reduces weight and is designed to reduce radar cross-section.

As patrol vessels, they are lightly armed. They carry various sensors, including the Furuno navigation radar and sonar. Armament on board includes a 30mm CRN-91 automatic cannon with an electronic day-night fire control system of Ordnance Factory Board (OFB) and Bharat Electronics Limited (BEL) origin. The vessels also mount two 12.7mm heavy machine guns (HMG) and multiple medium machine guns, besides carrying shoulder-launched Igla surface-to-air missiles to combat aerial threats.

== Service history ==
On 8 January 2024, Kabra arrived at the Port of Colombo, situated in Colombo, Sri Lanka, as part of a formal visit. Following the completion of the official engagement, the vessel departed from the island on 10 January 2024.

== Media ==
=== Video ===
- Indian Navy adds new warships

=== Images ===
- Commissioning ceremony of INS Kora Divh and INS Cheriyam
- Governor taking salute during commissioning ceremony
- INS Car Nicobar during commissioning ceremony
- INS Chetlat during commissioning ceremony
