= INS Tarasa (T94) =

Indian Navy patrol vessel

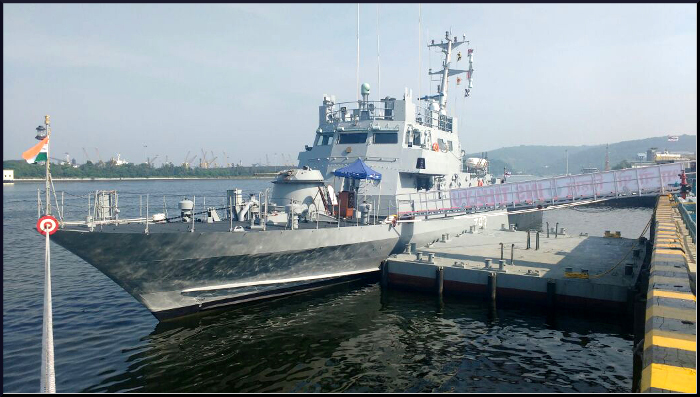
- Sister ship INS Tihayu (T93).

History

India
- Name: INS Tarasa (T94)
- Namesake: INS Tarasa (T63)
- Operator: Indian Navy
- Builder: Garden Reach Shipbuilders & Engineers
- Yard number: 2112
- Launched: 30 June 2016
- Commissioned: 26 September 2017
- Home port: Mumbai
- Status: Active

General characteristics
- Class & type: Car Nicobar-class
- Type: Fast attack craft
- Displacement: 325 tons
- Length: 48.9 m (160 ft)
- Beam: 7.5 m
- Draft: 4 m (13 ft)
- Speed: 35 knots (65 km/h)
- Endurance: 2,000 nautical miles (3,700 km)

INS Tarasa (T94) is a fast attack craft of the Car Nicobar class in the Indian Navy and the last ship in the series of four Follow On Water Jet Fast Attack Craft (FOWJFAC). Unlike the United States Coast Guard's similarly sized Sentinel class cutters, the class is propelled by water jets, at up to 35 knots (65 km/h), where the American patrol vessels conventional propulsion systems maximum stated speed is 28 knots (52 km/h). Both classes have a mission endurance of 2,000 nautical miles (3,700 km).

GRSE handed over the ship to the Indian Navy in Kolkata on 15 June 2017. From Kolkata, the ship will sail to Mumbai for its official commissioning. The ship was commissioned by Vice Admiral Girish Luthra, Flag Officer Commanding-in-Chief, Western Naval Command on 26 September 2017 at Mumbai. She will based under the operational control of Western Naval Command at Mumbai. Her commissioning Commanding officer is Lieutenant Commander Praveen Kumar.
