= Ajai Malhotra =

Indian diplomat (born 1953)

Ajai Malhotra, IFS (Retid.)
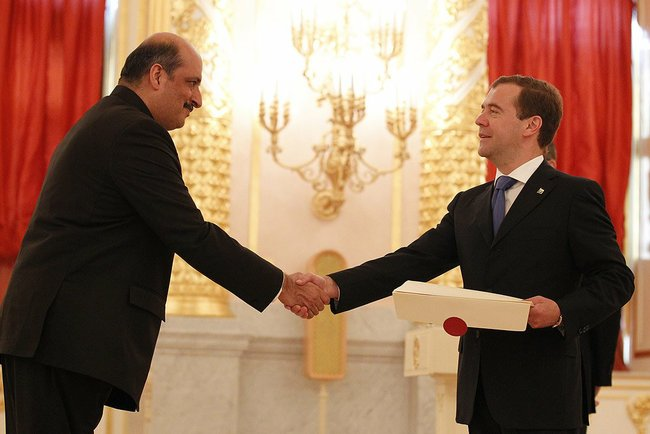

Former Indian Ambassador to the Russian Federation
- In office 16 May 2011 – 30 November 2013
- Preceded by: Prabhat Prakash Shukla
- Succeeded by: P. S. Raghavan

Personal details
- Born: 21 November 1953 (age 72) India
- Spouse: Ira Malhotra
- Education: Hindu College, Delhi; Delhi School of Economics; Delhi University
- Occupation: retired Diplomat
- Awards: Doctor of Letters

Ajai Malhotra is a retired Indian diplomat of the Indian Foreign Service who served as the ambassador of India to the Russian Federation. He is the chairperson of the advisory committee to the United Nations Human Rights Council, Geneva.

== Diplomatic career ==
He joined the Indian Foreign Service in 1977. From 1979 to 1982 he served at the High Commission in Nairobi, handling political work relating to Kenya and India's relations with Seychelles. From 1982 to 1985 he was Second Secretary (Pol.)/First Secretary (Pol.) at the Indian Embassy in Moscow.

From 1985, he served as First Secretary (Pol.) at the Permanent Mission of India to the UN in Geneva, where he handled work related to the WHO, WIPO, ILO and other UN agencies, represented India on the ILO Committee on Freedom of Association and also participated in annual meetings of the UN Human Rights Commission. He returned to the Ministry of External Affairs, New Delhi in 1989, as a Deputy Secretary handling human rights and international environmental issues, and later Director handling all multilateral issues except disarmament. As regards human rights, this included guiding processes leading to the ratification by India of the UN Convention on the Rights of the Child in 1992, UN Convention on the Elimination of All Forms of Discrimination Against Women in 1993, and the establishment of the National Human Rights Commission of India.

His association with global environmental issues has included participation in the UNEP Session of a Special Character: Ten Years after Stockholm (Nairobi; 1982); contribution to the drafting of the 1990 London Amendments to the Montreal Protocol on Substances that Deplete the Ozone Layer, Convention on Biological Diversity, UN Framework Convention on Climate Change, Rio Declaration on Environment and Development, Statement of Principles on Forests, and Agenda 21; and participation in the UN Conference on Environment and Development (Rio de Janeiro; 1992). He was a member of the UNEP group of legal experts to examine the concept of "Common Concern of Mankind" in relation to global environmental issues.

He was Counsellor (Information) at the Indian Embassy, Moscow, from 1993 to 1996, returning to the Ministry of External Affairs, New Delhi, as Director/Joint Secretary and guided India's foreign relations with 22 Central and Eastern European countries, including Russia. In 1999, he was assigned as Minister (Commerce) at the Embassy of India, Washington, D.C., where he served till 2003. He was also Vice Chairman (2000–2001), First Vice Chairman (2001–2002) and then Chairman (2002–2003) of the International Cotton Advisory Committee.

Ajai Malhotra's served as Ambassador of India to Romania (with concurrent accreditation to Moldova and Albania) from 2003 to 2005.

From 2005 to 2009, he was Ambassador and Deputy Permanent Representative of India to the UN, New York. Based on leaked American diplomatic cables, it was reported that Ajai Malhotra was posted to the UN Mission, New York to balance the anti-US decisions taken by Nirupam Sen, then Permanent Representative of India, to the UN. He participated in the negotiations leading to the setting up of the UN Democracy Fund, the UN Peacebuilding Commission and the UN Human Rights Council. His pivotal role in the development of the United Nations Democracy Fund was cited by the awards committee of the Palmer Prize for Advancing Democracy, awarded by the Council for a Community of Democracies.

He was Ambassador of India to Kuwait from 2009 to 2011. He was responsible for expanding the protection of Indian workers in Kuwai and set up a safe house, especially for domestic workers in distress. His tenure was also highlighted by high level visits from India to Kuwait, including by the vice-president of India, Hamid Ansari and S. M. Krishna, former External Affairs Minister.

He was the ambassador of India to Russia from 16 May 2011 – 30 November 2013. His tenure saw the visit of Indian prime minister, Manmohan Singh in mid-December 2011 to Russia, and Russian president Dmitry Medvedev to India in March 2012 for the BRICS summit in New Delhi. It also saw visits to India in December 2012 by Russian president Vladimir Putin and to Russia by Indian prime minister Manmohan Singh in September 2013 for the G20 Summit in St. Petersburg and in November 2013 to Moscow for the annual India-Russia Bilateral Summit. The 65th anniversary of bilateral Indo-Russian diplomatic relations was marked with year-long celebrations during his tenure. It also saw the induction of three Talwar-class frigates into the Indian Navy fleet, INS Teg, INS Tarkash, and INS Trikand, as well as India's nuclear powered submarine INS Chakra (2011) and aircraft carrier INS Vikramaditya. INS Trikand was launched by his wife, Mrs. Ira Malhotra. He retired on 30 November 2013.

== Later roles ==
Since February 2014, Malhotra is the chairman and Managing Trustee of Chikitsa which provides free primary health care in underserved communities and Shiksha which provides free education and vocational training to underprivileged children and youth.

Since April 2014 he is a Distinguished Fellow & Senior Adviser (Climate Change) at The Energy and Resources Institute, New Delhi. Since 2015 he is Chairman of the Managing Committee of the NAB Centre for Blind Women & Disability Studies and a member of the editorial board of the World Economy and International Relations Journal at the Institute of World Economy and International Relations, Moscow.

In 2015, he was elected Chairman of the Nehru Trust for the Indian Collections at the Victoria & Albert Museum.

On 20 November 2015, he was appointed an Independent Director of Oil and Natural Gas Corporation (ONGC).

On 16 January 2017, he was appointed an Independent Director of ONGC Videsh Limited.

On 29 September 2017, he was elected by secret ballot to the Advisory Committee of the United Nations Human Rights Council, Geneva.

On 7 October 2020, he was re-elected by acclamation to the Advisory Committee of the United Nations Human Rights Council, Geneva.

On 15 February 2021, he was elected the Chairperson of the Advisory Committee of the United Nations Human Rights Council, Geneva, the first Indian to hold this position.

== Recognition ==
In 2004, he was awarded a Doctorate (Honoris Causa) by the Vasile Goldiș Western University of Arad, Romania, in recognition of his work in support of environmental causes and sustainable development.

In 2011, he was cited by the awards committee of the Palmer Prize for Advancing Democracy, awarded by the Council for a Community of Democracies for his pivotal role in supporting democratic development and development of the United Nations Democracy Fund (UNDEF), and for being a forceful advocate of channelling UNDEF funds to civil society.

In 2015, he was conferred a 'Lifetime Achievement Award' by Hindu College, University of Delhi at its 13th Distinguished Alumni Awards in New Delhi.

== Personal life ==
His father is Om Prakash Malhotra who was an Indian army officer and served as the 10th Chief of Army Staff of the Indian Army from 1978-1981. He also served as an Indian ambassador to Indonesia and Governor of Punjab.

Ajai Malhotra is married to Ira Malhotra, who is a teacher and was the founding editor of 'Parenting' magazine in India. He launched the warship, the INS Trikand, which was delivered to India from Russia during his tenure.

== Bibliography ==
- Malhotra, Ajai (1997). Future Generations and International Law: Earthscan Law and Sustainable Development. Routledge. ISBN 1-317-97178-7.
- Malhotra, Ajai (2015). India-Russia-China: Is There a Case for Strategic Partnership?. Vij Books India Pvt Limited. ISBN 9789384464653.
- Malhotra, Ajai (April–June 2016). "Climate Change: Tackling the Challenge Confronting India" (PDF). Indian Foreign Affairs Journal. 11: 124–138.

Political offices
Preceded by Prabhat Prakash Shukla	Indian Ambassador to the Russian Federation; 2011-2014	Succeeded by P.S. Raghavan
