= LEND Network =

The LEND Network (for Leaders Engaged in New Democracies) is an initiative of the Community of Democracies designed to bring together key leaders from countries undergoing democratic transitions with leaders who helped guide their own countries' recent successful democratic transitions, allowing them to share experiences, best practices, and advice about how to navigate the challenges and opportunities of democratization.

Participants in the LEND Network currently include approximately 60 civil society representatives, political activists, and civil servants from Tunisia and Moldova (approximately 30 from each country) and more than 50 international advisers, such as former senior-level government officials or experts in civil society.

== Overview ==
The LEND Network is a global forum for exchanging information and expertise on democratization to support leaders as they work to build strong and accountable democratic institutions. It provides peer advice and support for leaders and policy makers in key emerging democracies around the world. The Network brings together devoted key leaders from the world’s newest democracies with former heads of states, leaders and scholars experienced with democratic transition, overcoming financial and logistical barriers that have limited such efforts in the past and enabling true professional dialogue over the virtual platform.

This platform consists of a secure and invitation-only online portal which facilitates participants' real-time voice, video, and text communication with integrated text translation. This online platform is supplemented with in-person meetings based on relevant and timely subjects. The initiative is led by a Community of Democracies Working Group co-chaired by Estonia and the United States, and implemented by the Permanent Secretariat of the Community of Democracies.

Communities within the platform are based on different key aspects of democratic transitions, including: constitutional reform, civil society, accountability, education, human rights, justice sector reform, diplomacy, local governance, and more.

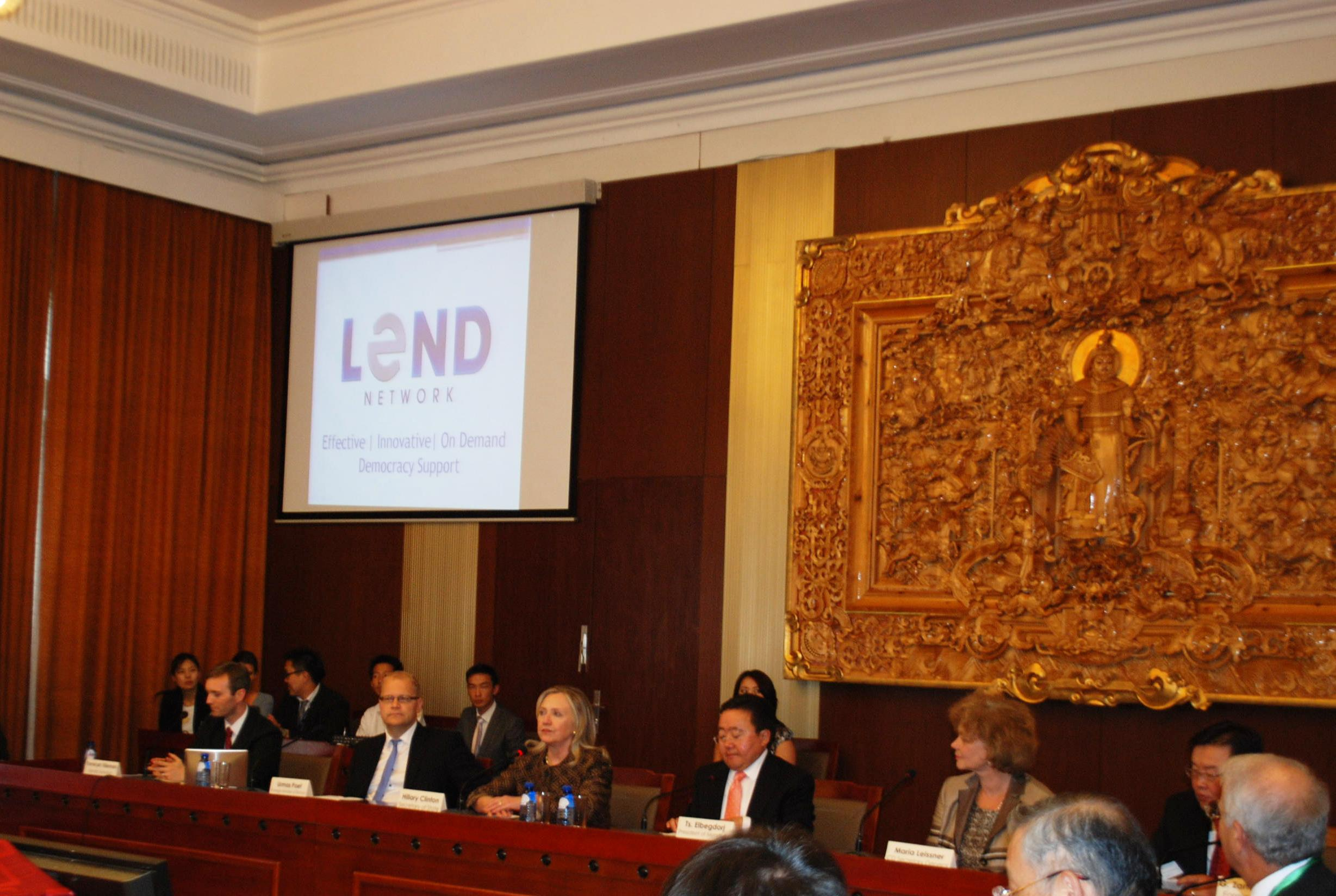
Announcement of the launch of the initiative in Ulaanbaatar (2012)

To complement the online platform's facilitation of individual conversation and substantive participation from leaders and advisers, the Community of Democracies and Club de Madrid have also convened a number of face-to-face meetings between the participants. Face-to-face meetings have been held in Moldova, Sweden, Slovakia, and Tunisia. This includes a special workshop in Tunisia on constitution building, held at the peak of the constitutional crisis in Tunisia and largely contributing to the democratic discourse and the continuation of the peaceful consolidation process in the country.

The LEND Network was conceived by American diplomat and technologist Tomicah S. Tillemann and formally launched on July 9, 2012 during a meeting of the Governing Council of the Community of Democracies in Ulaanbaatar, Mongolia by former U.S. Secretary of State Hillary Clinton and Estonian Foreign Minister Urmas Paet.

== Partners ==
In addition to the Community of Democracies, Estonia, and the United States, the Club de Madrid has organized several events LEND Network participants, and the Network also collaborates with the Club de Tunis, USAID, and the Swedish International Development Cooperation Agency (SIDA). The technology platform and tools are provided by OpenText, Dialcom-Spontania, and Google.
