= RNOV Shabab Oman (1977) =

Ship built in 1971

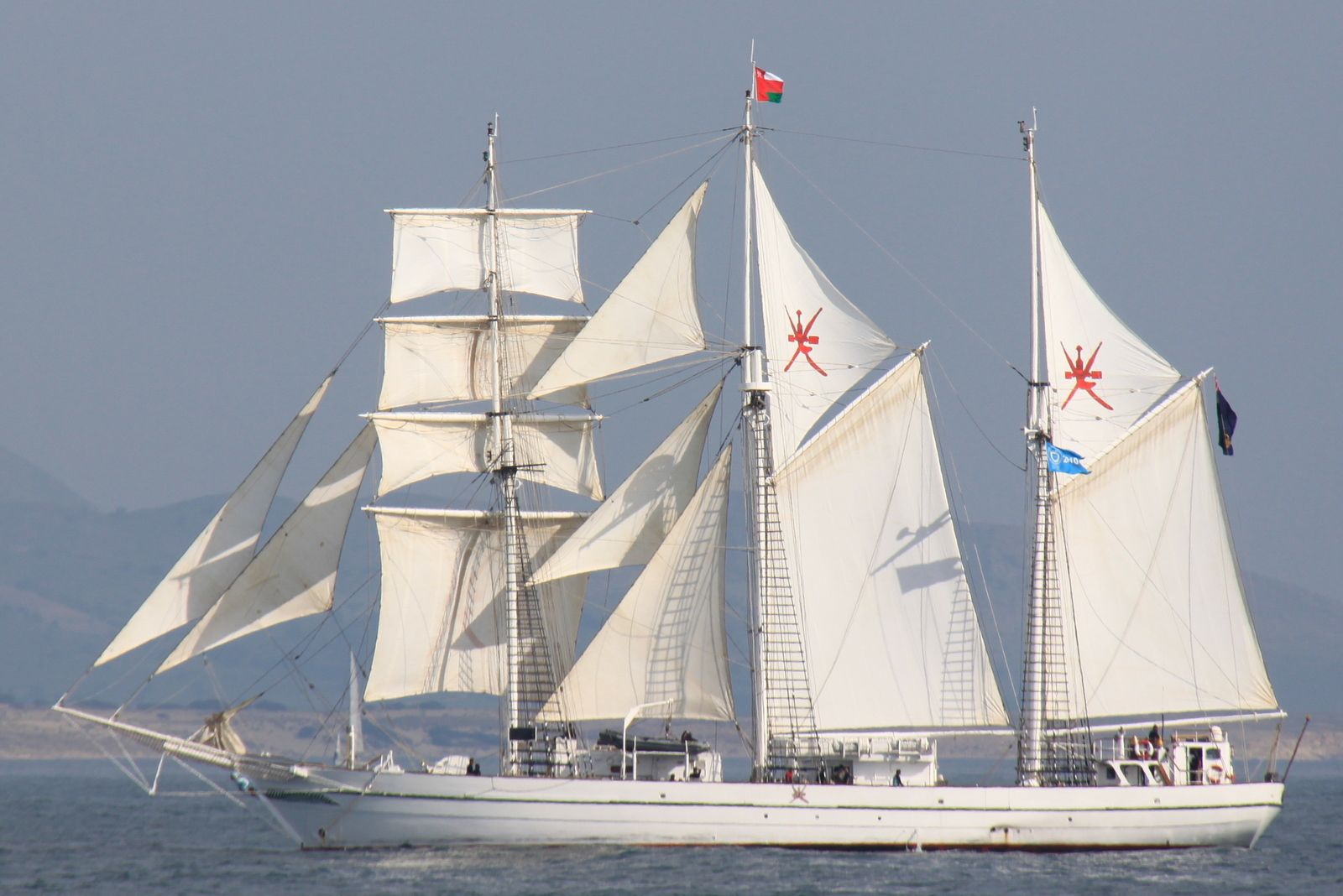
- RNOV Shabab Oman

History

Oman
- Name: Captain Scott (1971–1978); Shabab Oman
- Owner: Sultanate of Oman
- Operator: Royal Navy of Oman
- Builder: Herd & McKenzie Shipbuilders Buckie, Banffshire, Scotland
- Launched: 1971
- Sponsored by: Dulverton Trust
- Acquired: 1977 by Sultanate of Oman
- Refit: 1984, converted from schooner to barquentine
- Home port: 1971–1978; Plockton, Ross-shire, Scotland United Kingdom; 1978–2014; Muscat Oman
- Identification: Call sign: A4YO; IMO number: 7125598; MMSI number: 461000411
- Status: In service

General characteristics
- Type: Sail training vessel
- Tonnage: 265.35 tons gross; 54.97 tons net
- Displacement: 380 tons
- Length: 44 m (144 ft); 52.1 m (171 ft) overall
- Beam: 8.5 m (28 ft)
- Height: 30.2 m (99 ft) from deck to top of mainmast
- Draft: 4.5 m (15 ft)
- Propulsion: Sail; two auxiliary 230HP Gardner diesel engines
- Sail plan: Three-masted barquentine; 14 sails; 1,020 m^{2} (11,000 sq ft) total sail area
- Speed: 13 knots maximum
- Crew: Six permanent crew; three rotating instructors; 36 trainees

RNOV Shabab Oman is a barquentine which serves as a training ship for the Royal Navy of Oman.

== History ==
Originally named the Captain Scott after explorer Robert Falcon Scott, Shabab Oman was built as a standing topgallant yard schooner by Herd and McKenzie of Buckie, Scotland in 1971. Built for the Dulverton Trust, she was run by the Loch Eil Trust in programs which combined sail training with onshore expeditions.

In 1967, Victor Clark and Kurt Hahn had enlisted Prince Philip's aid in finding sponsorship for a new youth-training ship. Clark then skippered her until 1974.

In 1977, the vessel was sold to Sultan Qābūs bin Sa‘īd of Oman and placed under the purview of the Ministry of Youth. Her name was changed to Shabab Oman, which can be translated as "Youth of Oman." In 1979, she was inducted into the Royal Navy of Oman (RNO) as a sail training ship.

In 1984, Shabab Oman was refitted as a barquentine.

== Construction ==
Shabab Oman is constructed of Scottish oak and pine from Uruguay. Her lower masts are aluminum alloy, and her upper masts and spars are rattan plywood

She is 52 metres long and 30 meters high.

== Career ==
In 1992 the ship took part in the Gran Regatta de Colon sailing from Cádiz to San Juan, Puerto Rico along with other tall ships from throughout the world led by recreations of the Niña, Pinta, and Santa María.

In 1989, J Lawson Modelmakers of Lincolnshire, England were tasked to build a half scale replica of the ship as part of the Sultanate of Oman Navy involvement in the 21st national Day celebrations. The model took some 18 months to plan, procure and manufacture on site in Muscat. Shabab Oman was replaced by a new ship of the same name in August 2014, but remains moored at the RNOV naval base.

== Gallery ==
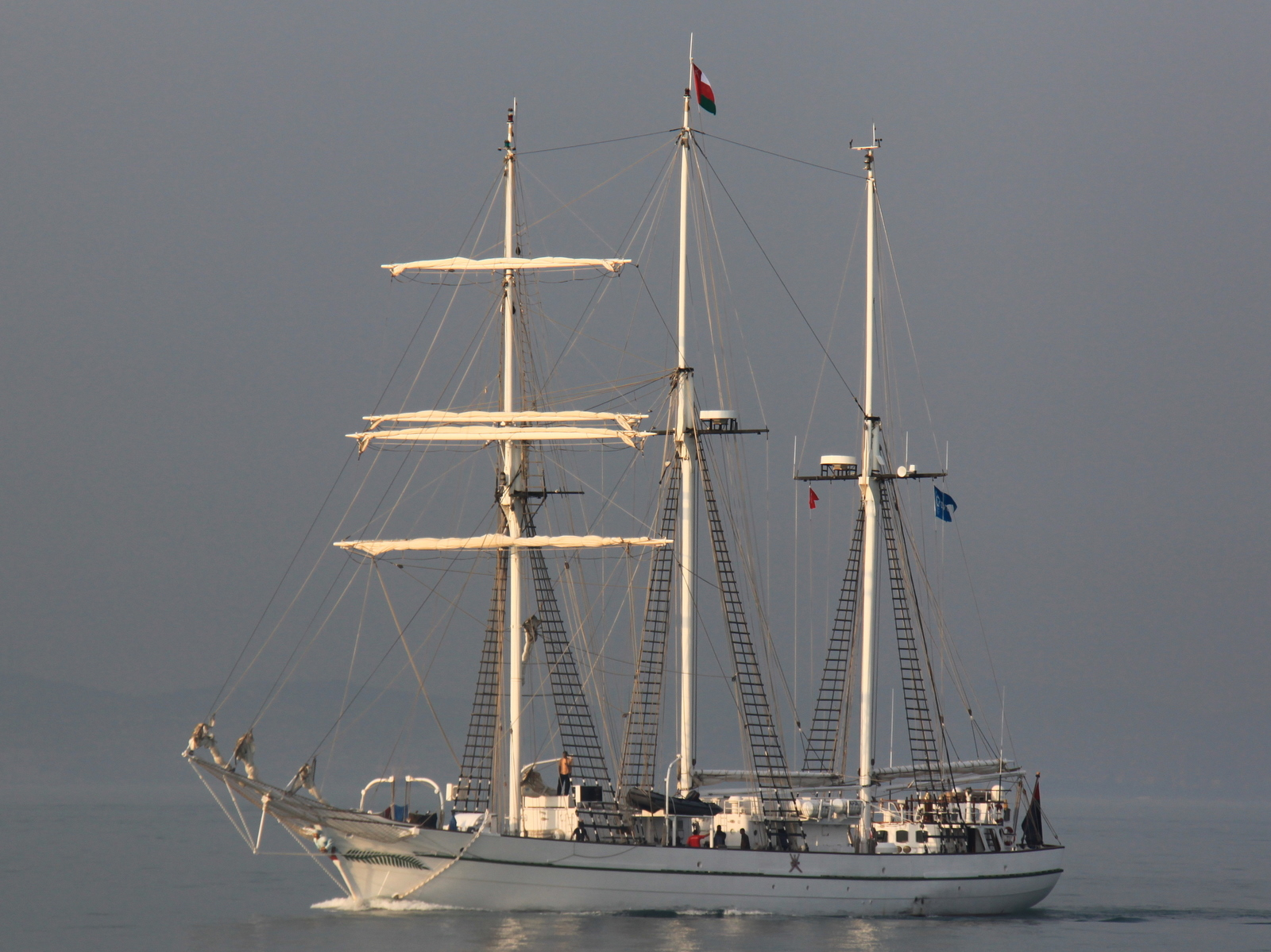
Without sails

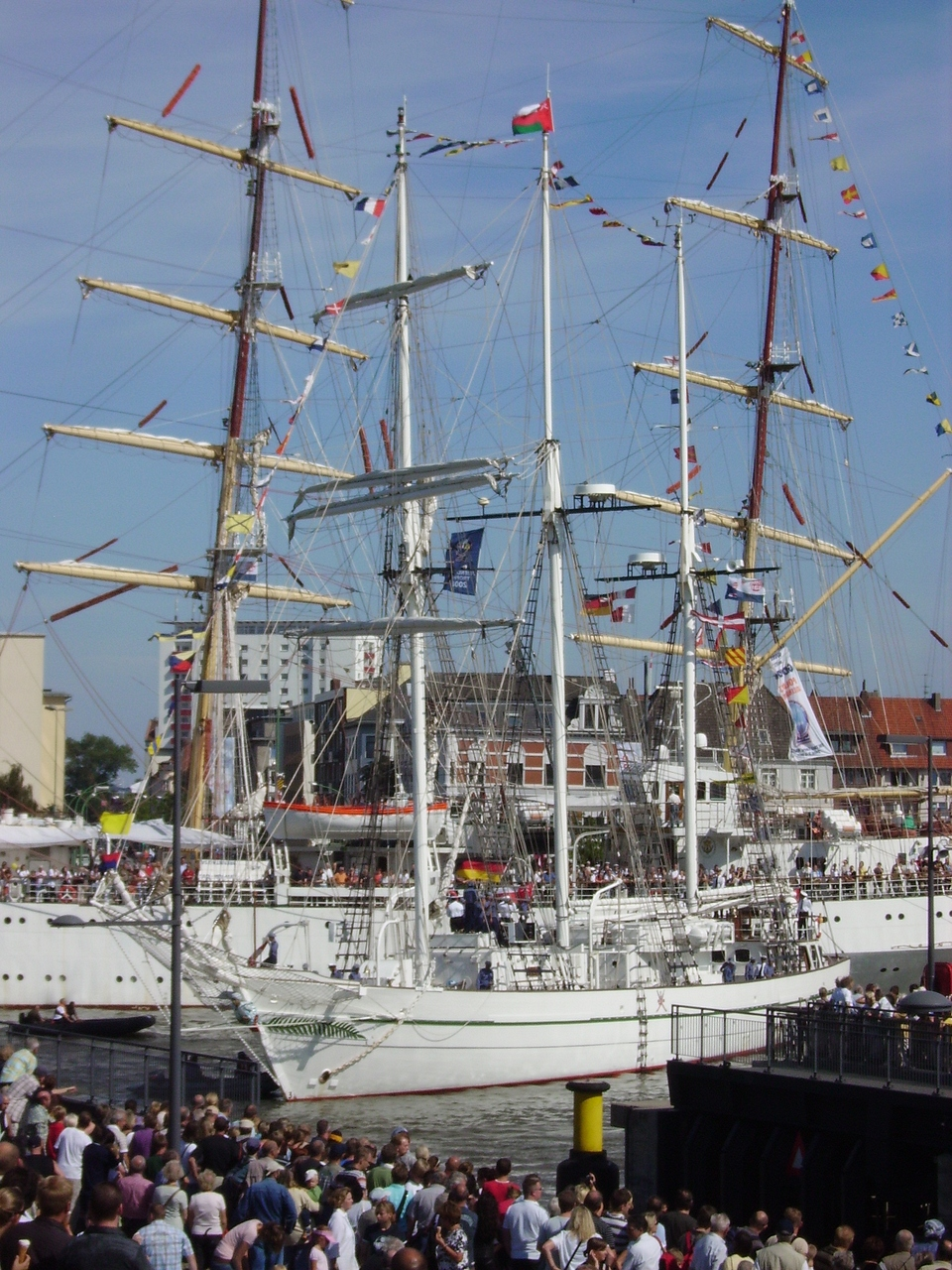
in Bremerhaven, Germany

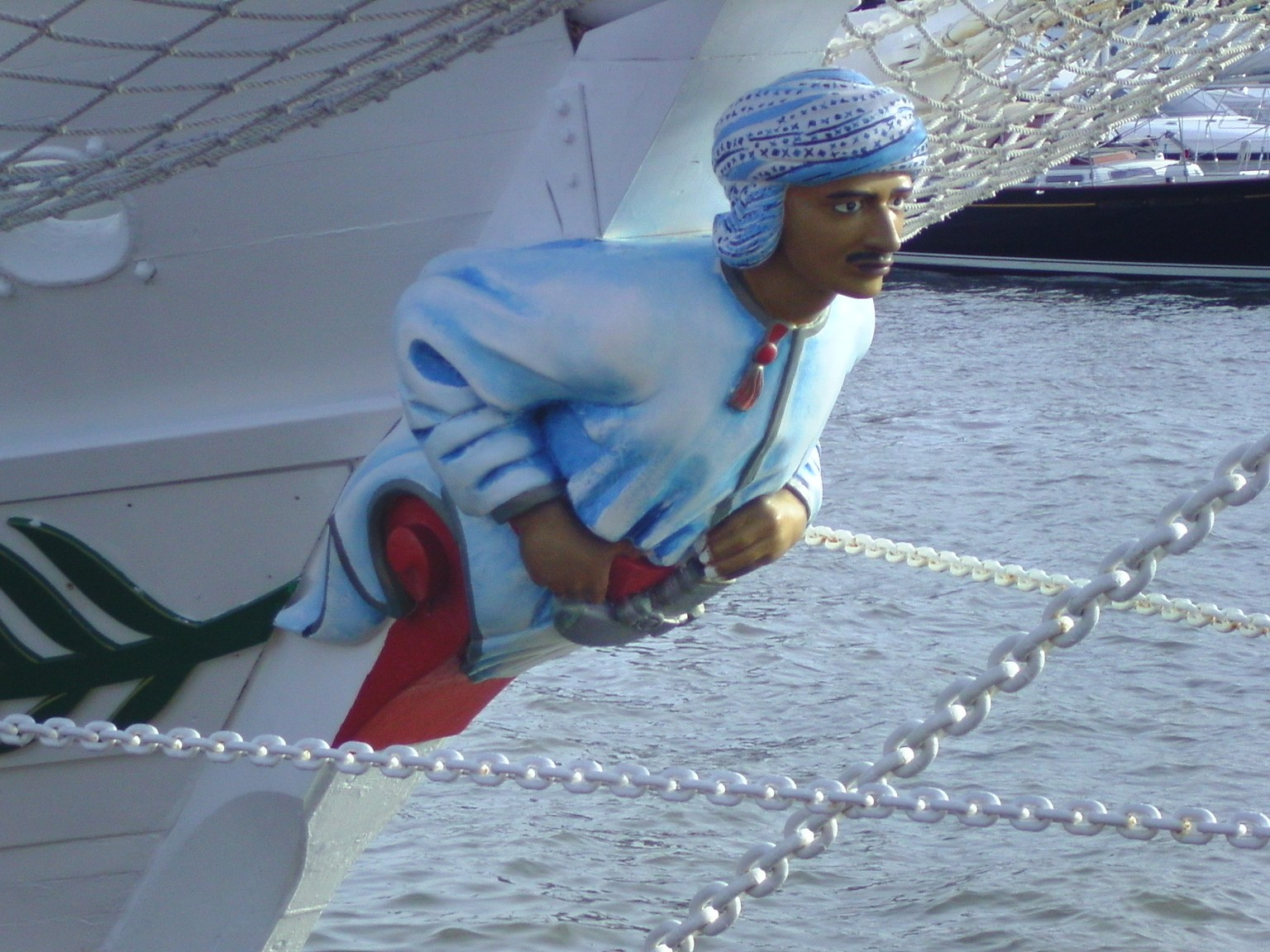
The figurehead

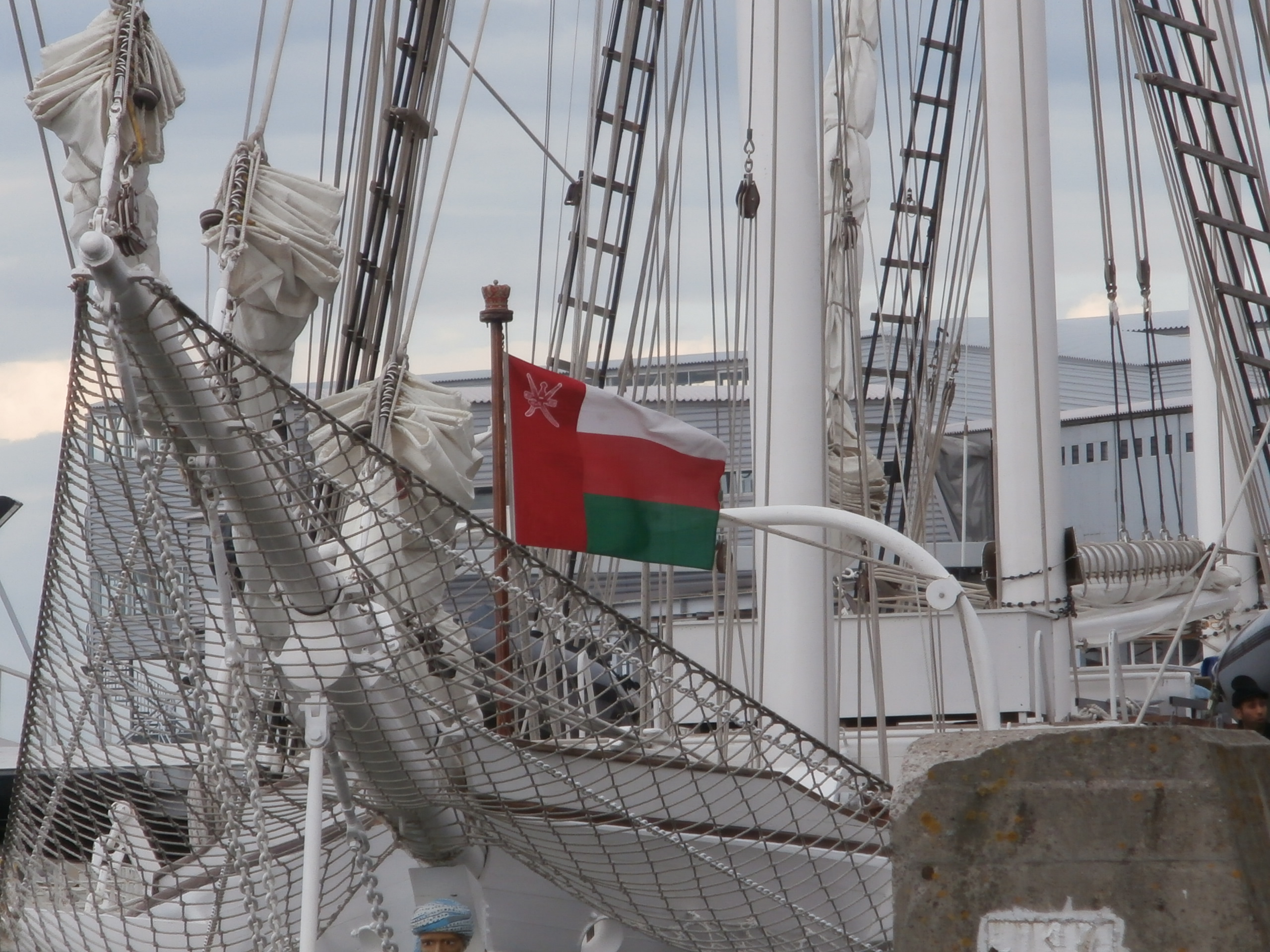
Ensign on the bow

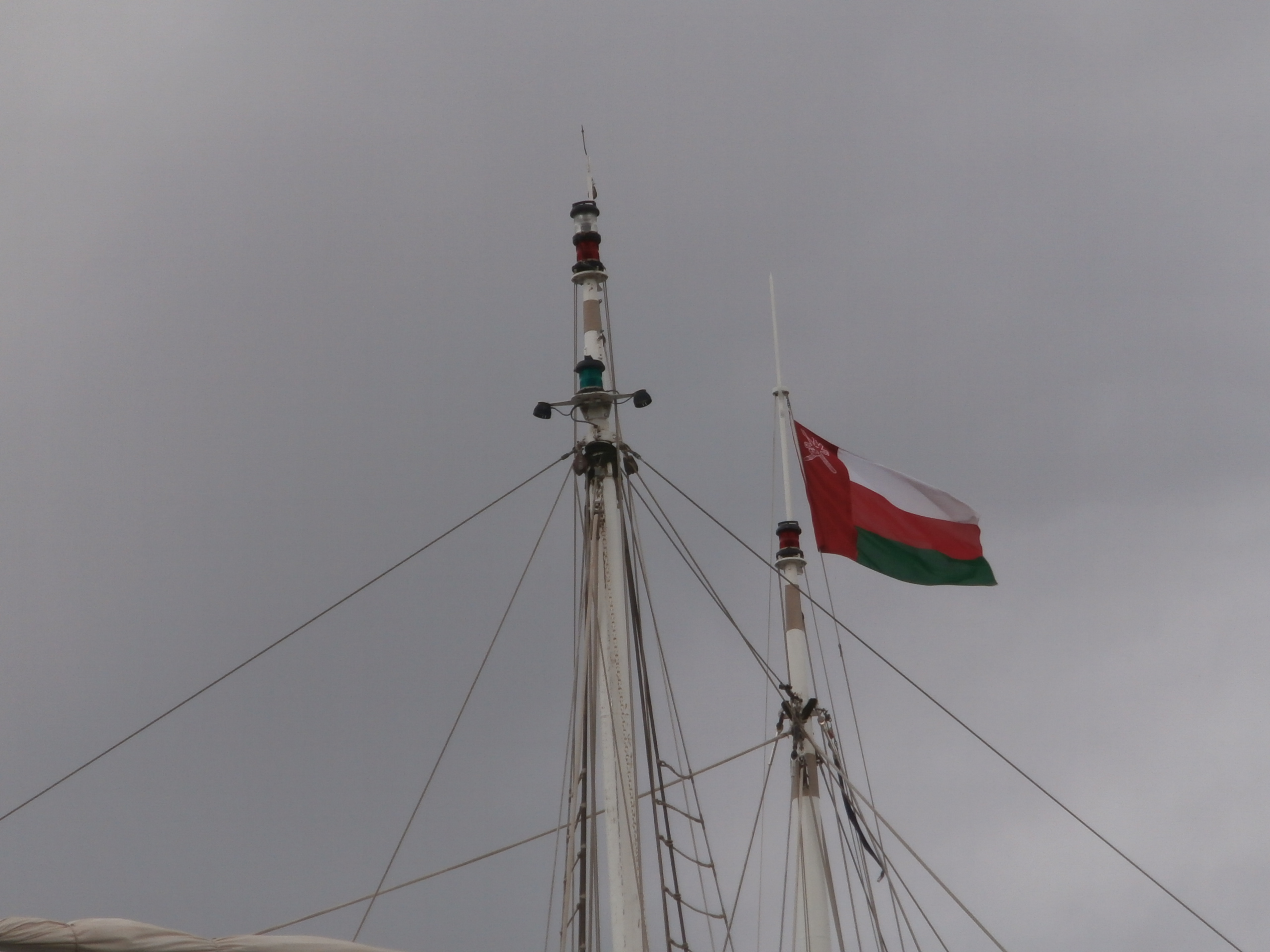
Top with ensign
