= Shabab Oman II =

Sailing ship built in 2014

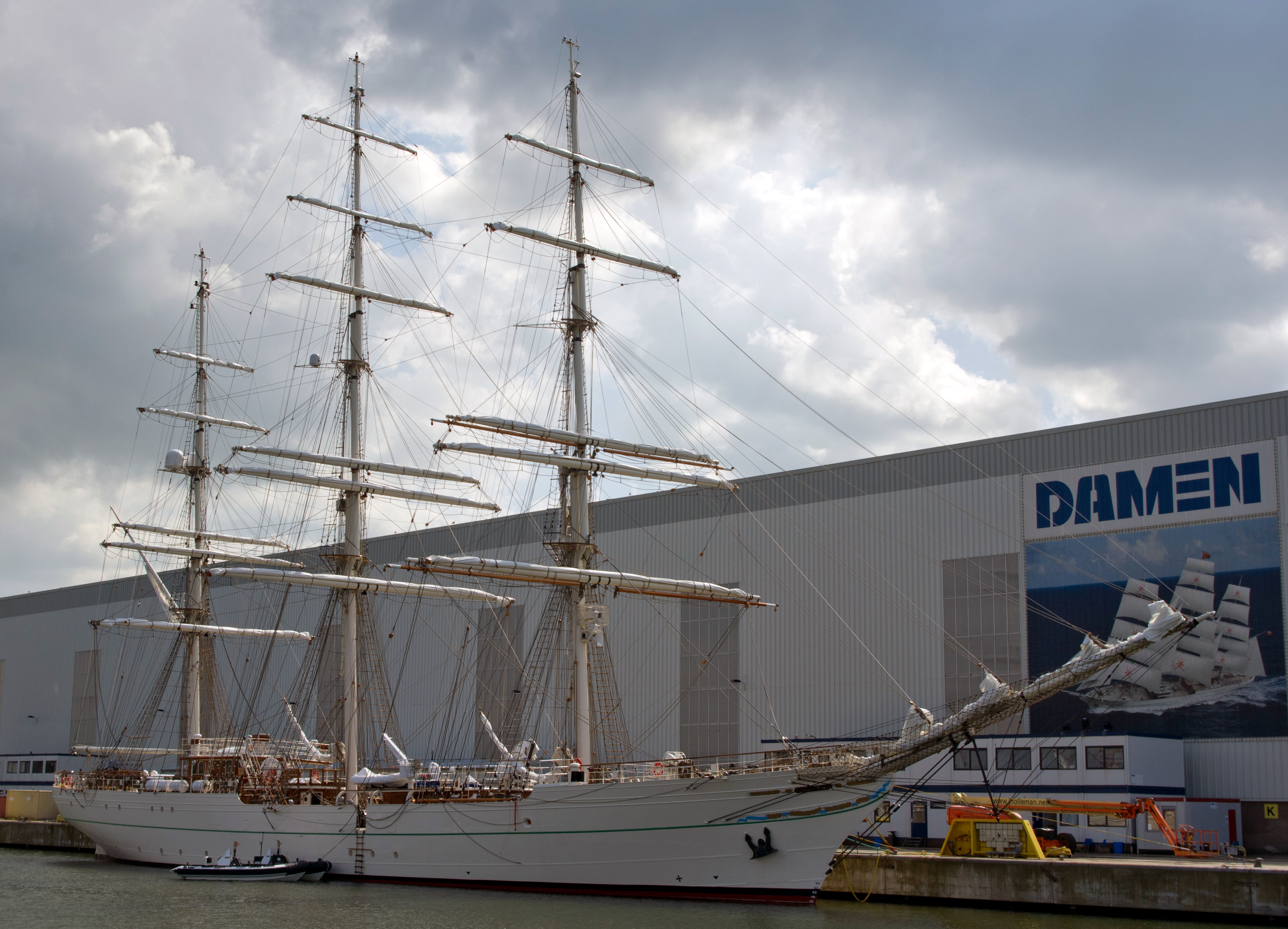

History

Oman
- Name: Shabab Oman II
- Owner: Royal Navy of Oman
- Builder: Damen Shipyards, Galati and Gorinchem
- Yard number: 557001
- Laid down: March 2013
- Launched: 7 May 2014
- Commissioned: 12 September 2014
- Identification: Call sign: A4LB; IMO number: 9667215; MMSI number: 461000441
- Status: In service
- Notes: Designer: Dykstra Naval Architects, Amsterdam, Netherlands

General characteristics
- Class & type: Sail training vessel
- Tonnage: 955 GT, 360 DWT
- Length: 87 metres (285 ft)
- Beam: 11 metres (36 ft)
- Height: 50 metres (160 ft)
- Propulsion: Sails, 2,700 square metres (29,000 sq ft) and twin diesel engines
- Sail plan: Full-rigged ship
- Speed: Up to 17 knots (31 km/h) under sail
- Complement: 58, plus 34 trainees

Shabab Oman II (English: Youth of Oman) is a full-rigged ship which entered service with the Royal Navy of Oman in August 2014, replacing the current ship of the same name. She is a full-rigged ship which was built in Romania, fitted out in the Netherlands and launched in 2013.

== Description ==
Shabab Oman II is an 87-metre (285 ft) long ship with a beam of 11 metres (36 ft). She will be rigged as a full-rigged ship with a total of 2,700 square metres (29,000 sq ft) of sails. Assessed at 750 GT, 360 DWT, Shabab Oman II has a complement of 58, with an additional 34 trainees.

== History ==
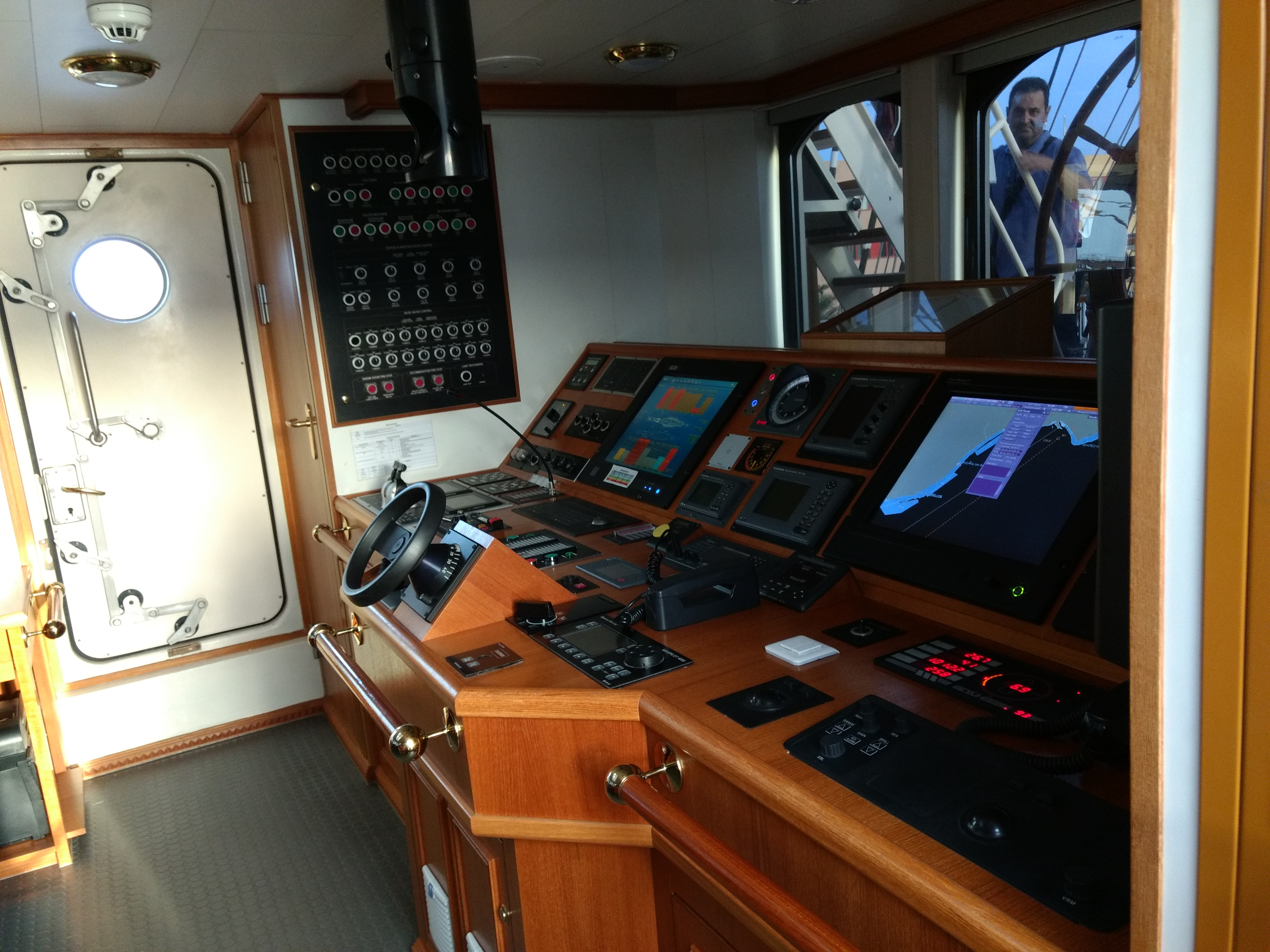
Boat control bridge

Shabab Oman II was designed by Dykstra Naval Architects, Amsterdam, Netherlands. Her keel was laid in March 2013. She was built by Damen Shipyards, Galaţi, Romania and launched on 2 December 2013. The IMO Number 9662715 was allocated. In January 2014, she was towed to Damen Schelde Naval Shipbuilding, Vlissingen, Netherlands for fitting out, including the fitting of her masts, the tallest of which will measure 50 metres (160 ft). She entered service with the Royal Navy of Oman in August 2014. Shabab Oman II replaced the previous RNOV Shabab Oman after entering service.

== Voyages ==
Her first long voyage was the crossing of the Mediterranean Sea, the Red Sea, the Arabian Sea and the Sea of Oman to reach Muscat, the Omani capital.

During her fourth voyage from 15 April to August 2019, Shabab Oman II visited 17 ports in 12 countries and had some 211,000 visitors aboard most of them during her participation in the Armada Festival in the port of Rouen, France, 6–16 June 2019.

She participated in Kiel Week and the 2022 Tall Ships Races in the Black Sea on her sixth international voyage, visiting a number of European countries and earning honors as the vessel travelling the furthest distance to participate in the festival.
