= Al-Ofouq-class patrol vessel =

Omani naval ship class

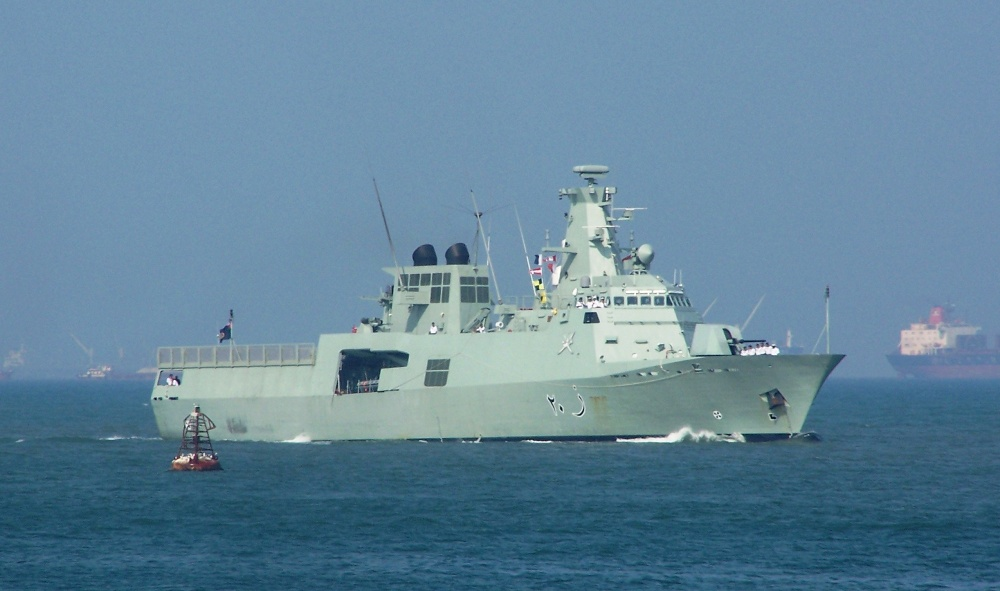
- Al-Ofouq class

Class overview
- Builders: ST Marine
- Operators: Royal Navy of Oman
- Preceded by: Province-class fast attack craft
- Planned: 4
- Completed: 4
- Active: 4

General characteristics
- Type: Patrol boat
- Displacement: 1,100 tonnes
- Length: 75 m (246 ft)
- Beam: 10.8 m (35 ft)
- Draught: 3.3 m (11 ft)
- Propulsion: 2 x MTU 20V 8000 M91 diesel engines, CODELOD
- Speed: 25 knots (46 km/h; 29 mph)
- Range: 3,000 nmi (5,600 km; 3,500 mi)
- Complement: 66
- Sensors & processing systems: Thales Variant 2D radar; TACTICOS combat management system; Thales Nederland STIR 1.2 EO Mk 2 electro-optic weapons director
- Electronic warfare & decoys: Thales Vigile ESM; Lacroix Sylena multimode soft-kill decoy system
- Armament: 1 × 76 mm Oto Melara cannon, 'A' position; 2 × 30 mm Oto Melara Marlin-WS, amidship
- Aviation facilities: Flight deck capable of launching one medium-sized helicopter

The Al-Ofouq class are four patrol vessels of Royal Navy of Oman as replacements for the Province-class fast attack craft patrol vessels.

Following a competitive international tender in April 2012, ST Marine of Singapore won the USD703 million contract from the Omani Defence Ministry, beating off Damen Schelde Naval Shipbuilding and India's Goa Shipyard. The Al-Ofouq class is based on the 75 m (246 ft) variant of the 55 m (180 ft) Fearless-class patrol vessel currently used by the Republic of Singapore Navy.

== Operational history ==
RNOS Al-Seeb and Al-Shinas took part in the 13th edition of Indo-Oman maritime exercise ‘Naseem Al Bahr’ (Sea Breeze) along with the Indian Navy's INS Trikand, INS Sumitra and Dornier 228 MPA from 19–24 November 2022. BAE Systems Hawk of the Royal Air Force of Oman also participated in the exercise.

RNOS Al-Seeb paid a good will visit to the Port of Kochi, India between 8 and 12 October 2024. The ship was welcomed by the Southern Naval Command Band. This was coincidental with the Muscat, Oman visit First Training Squadron's (1TS) visit to amid their Long-Range Deployment. Following the port call, the ship also took part in the 14th edition of Indo-Oman maritime exercise ‘Naseem Al Bahr’ (Sea Breeze) along with the Indian Navy's INS Trikand and Dornier 228 MPA from 13–18 October 2024.

RNOS Al-Seeb again visited Kochi for a four-day visit on 6 October 2025 under the command of Lieutenant Commander Ahmed Bin Mohammed Bin Salim Al Saidi.

== Ships of class ==
| Number | Pennant number | Name | Builder | Launched | Commissioned | Status |
|---|---|---|---|---|---|---|
| 1 | Z 20 | Al-Seeb | ST Marine, Benoi, Singapore | 29 January 2014 | 31 March 2015 | Active |
| 2 | Z 21 | Al-Shinas | ST Marine, Benoi, Singapore | 14 June 2014 | | Active |
| 3 | Z 22 | Sadh | ST Marine, Benoi, Singapore | 17 September 2014 | | Active |
| 4 | Z 23 | Khassab | ST Marine, Benoi, Singapore | 24 June 2016 | 2 August 2016 | Active |
