= INS Trikand =

Indian Navy frigate

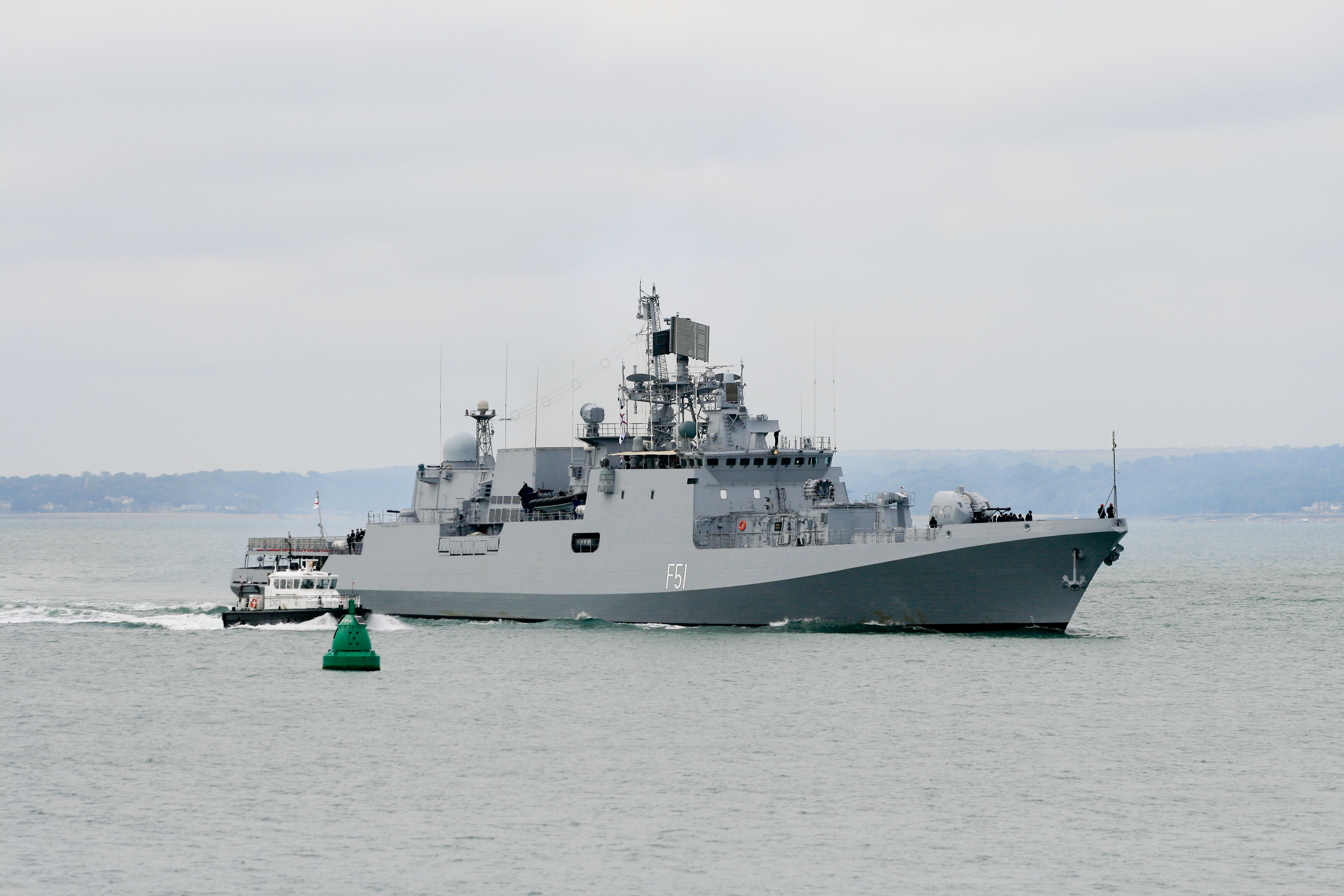
- INS Trikand entering Portsmouth Naval Base, UK, 2013

History

India
- Name: INS Trikand
- Namesake: 'Mythological arrow consisting of three arrowheads'
- Ordered: 14 July 2007
- Builder: Yantar Shipyard
- Laid down: 11 June 2008
- Launched: 25 May 2011
- Commissioned: 29 June 2013
- Status: in active service

General characteristics
- Class & type: Talwar-class frigate
- Displacement: 3,620 long tons (3,678 t) standard; 4,035 long tons (4,100 t) full load
- Length: 124.8 m (409 ft 5 in)
- Beam: 15.2 m (49 ft 10 in)
- Draught: 4.5 m (14 ft 9 in)
- Propulsion: 2 × DS-71 cruise turbines (9,000 shp)); 2 × DT-59 boost turbines (19,500 shp)
- Speed: 30 kn (56 km/h; 35 mph)
- Range: 4,850 nmi (8,980 km; 5,580 mi) at 14 kn (26 km/h; 16 mph); 1,600 nmi (3,000 km; 1,800 mi) at 30 kn (56 km/h; 35 mph)
- Complement: 180 (18 officers)
- Sensors & processing systems: 1 × 3Ts-25E Garpun-B surface search radar; 1 × MR-212/201-1 navigation radar; 1 × Kelvin Hughes Nucleus-2 6000A radar; 1 × Ladoga-ME-11356 intertial navigation and stabilisation; 1 × Fregat M2EM 3D circular scan radar; 1 × Ratep JSC 5P-10E Puma fire-control system; 1 × 3R14N-11356 fire-control system FCS; 4 × MR-90 Orekh; BEL HUMSA (Hull Mounted Sonar Array)
- Electronic warfare & decoys: 1 × TK-25E-5 EWS; 1 × PK-10 ship-borne decoy launching systems; 4 × KT-216 decoy launchers
- Armament: Anti-air missiles: 24 × Shtil-1 medium range missiles; 8 × Igla-1E (SA-16); Anti-ship/Land-attack missiles: 8 × VLS launched BrahMos, anti-ship cruise missiles; Guns: 1 × 100 mm A-190E, naval gun; 2 × AK-630 CIWS; Anti-submarine warfare: 2 × 2 533 mm torpedo tubes; 1 × RBU-6000 (RPK-8) rocket launcher
- Aircraft carried: 1 × Ka-28 Helix-A, Ka-31 Helix B or HAL Dhruv helicopter

INS Trikand (F51) (lit. 'Triple Arrow') is a Talwar-class frigate of the Indian Navy. She is the third and final ship of the second batch of Talwar-class frigates ordered by the Indian Navy. She was built by the Yantar shipyard in Kaliningrad, Russia. She was commissioned to Indian Navy service on 29 June 2013.

== Design ==
Trikand belongs to the Talwar class of guided missile frigates. These are modified Krivak III-class frigates built by Russia. These ships use stealth technologies and a special hull design to ensure a reduced radar cross section. Much of the equipment on the ship is Russian-made, but a significant number of systems of Indian origin have also been incorporated. The main difference between the second batch and the first three Talwar-class ships is the use of BrahMos missiles in place of the Klub-N missiles in the earlier ships. She is the last of the three frigates built in Russia as a follow-up order to the first batch of Talwar-class frigates.

== Construction ==
Trikand was laid down on 11 June 2008. She was launched on 27 May 2011 by Ira Malhotra, the wife of the Indian Ambassador to Russia, Ajai Malhotra. Delivery was delayed from the original goal of April 2012 due to labour shortages and supply chain issues.

She was commissioned into the Indian Navy on 29 June 2013 by Vice Admiral R K Dhowan, Vice Chief of Naval Staff, in a ceremony held at Kaliningrad. Captain Ajay Kochhar was the commissioning commanding officer of INS Trikand. She joined join the Western Fleet of the Indian Navy. In 2016 the ship won award of Unit Citation 2016 and after that in march 2017 the Ship won Best Ship 2016-17 award under the command of Captain Arjun Dev Nair.

== Service history ==
Deployment	Date	Port visited	Commander	Notes and References
2013
Commissioned	29 June 2013	England	Captain Ajay Kochhar	
2016
East Africa and the Southern Indian Ocean with naval destroyer INS Kolkata and fleet tanker INS Aditya	31 August–3 September	Antsirananna, Madagascar	Captain Arjun Dev Nair	Relief material for people affected by bush fires.
East Africa and the Southern Indian Ocean with naval destroyer INS Kolkata and fleet tanker INS Aditya	6–9 September	Dar es Salaam, Tanzania	Captain Arjun Dev Nair	
East Africa and the Southern Indian Ocean with naval destroyer INS Kolkata and fleet tanker INS Aditya	17–20 September	Maputo, Mozambique	Captain Arjun Dev Nair	
East Africa and the Southern Indian Ocean with naval destroyer INS Kolkata and fleet tanker INS Aditya	20–23 September	Durban, South Africa	Captain Arjun Dev Nair	
2022
Arabian Sea with INS Sumitra and Dornier 228 MPA.	19–24 November			13th edition of Indo-Oman maritime exercise 'Naseem Al Bahr' (Sea Breeze) with RNOS Al-Seeb and Al-Shinas.
2024
Arabian Sea with Dornier 228 MPA.	13–18 October	Goa, India		14th edition of Indo-Oman maritime exercise 'Naseem Al Bahr' (Sea Breeze) with RNOS Al-Seeb.
2025
Mediterranean Sea	1–10 September	Port of Alexandria, Egypt	Captain Sachin Kulkarni	Participated in the 2025 edition of multilateral Exercise Bright Star.
Mediterranean Sea	13 September	Salamis Naval Base, Greece	Captain Sachin Kulkarni	Participated in the maiden bilateral exercise of Greece and India.
Mediterranean Sea	21–24 September	Evangelos Florakis Naval Base, Limassol, Cyprus	Captain Sachin Kulkarni	
Mediterranean Sea	21 September – 02 October	Port of Taranto, Italy	Captain Sachin Kulkarni	
Mediterranean Sea	22 October	Gulf of Aden	Captain Sachin Kulkarni	Conducted rescue and firefighting operations onboard MV Falcon.
2026
South West Indian Ocean	10 – 13 March	Port Louis, Mauritius	Captain Sachin Kulkarni	The ship's marching contingent took part in the 58th Mauritius National Day celebrations on 12 March at Champ de Mars while its integral helicopter, an HAL Chetak, took part in the flypast. Trikand also undertook a PASSEX and EEZ surveillance with CGS Valiant following departure.
South West Indian Ocean	16 – 20 March	Port Victoria, Seychelles	Captain Sachin Kulkarni	Marked Navy's maiden participation in Exercise LAMITIYE. Personnel from the Assam Regiment of the Indian Army and a C-130J of the Indian Air Force were also present.
South West Indian Ocean	26 March	Maputo, Mozambique	Captain Sachin Kulkarni	
South West Indian Ocean	3 April	Dar-es-Salaam, Tanzania	Captain Sachin Kulkarni	The crew will engage in professional interactions and joint training activities with the Tanzania Navy.
South West Indian Ocean	7 – 10 April	Mombasa Port, Kenya	Captain Sachin Kulkarni	
Arabian Sea	3 July	Gulf of Aden	Captain Sachin Kulkarni	INS Trikand intercepted a piracy attempt on the St Vincent and Grenadines-flagged MV Golden Arsenal and escorted the ship to Djibouti.

== Gallery ==
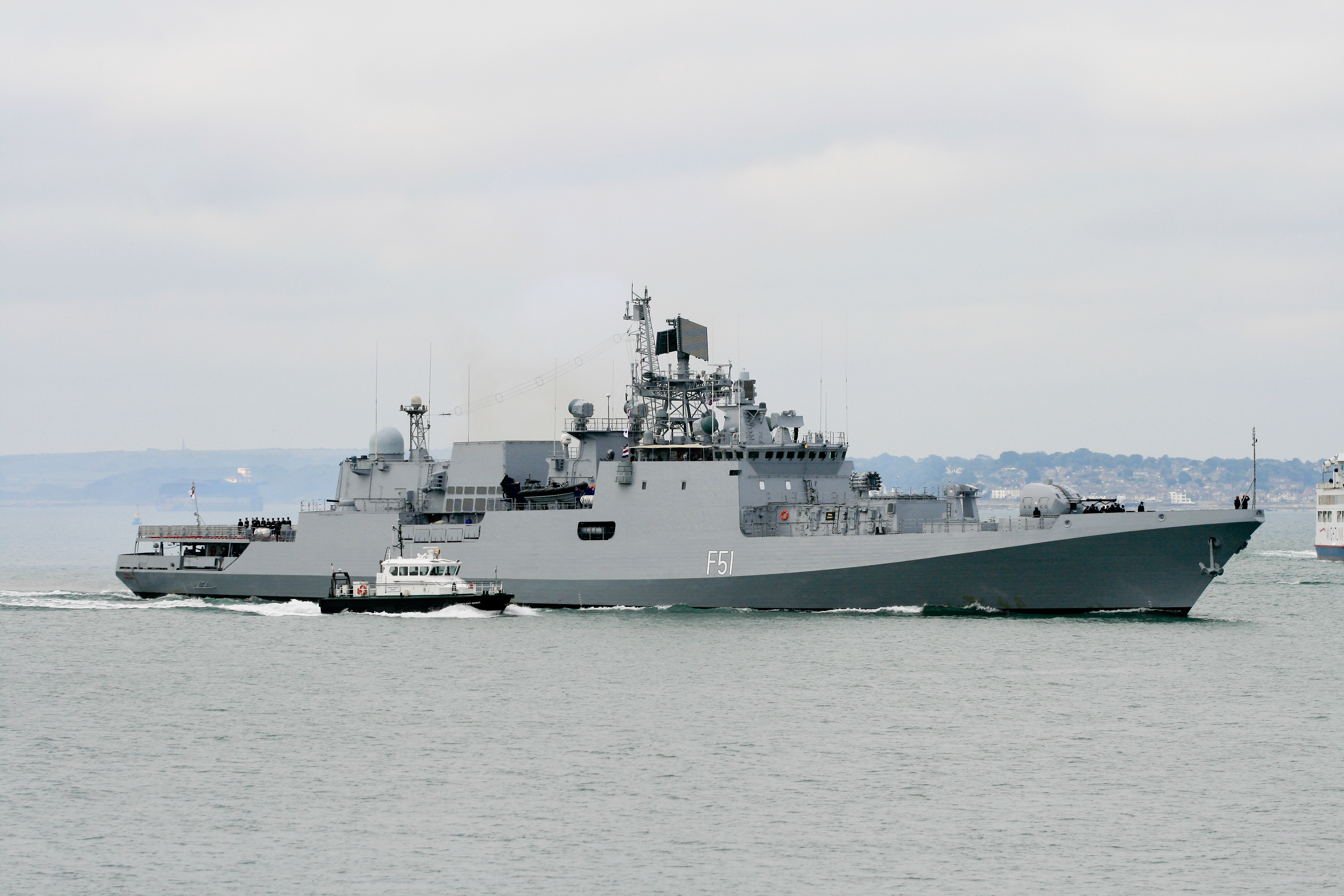
INS Trikand (F51) Portsmouth, UK, 2013

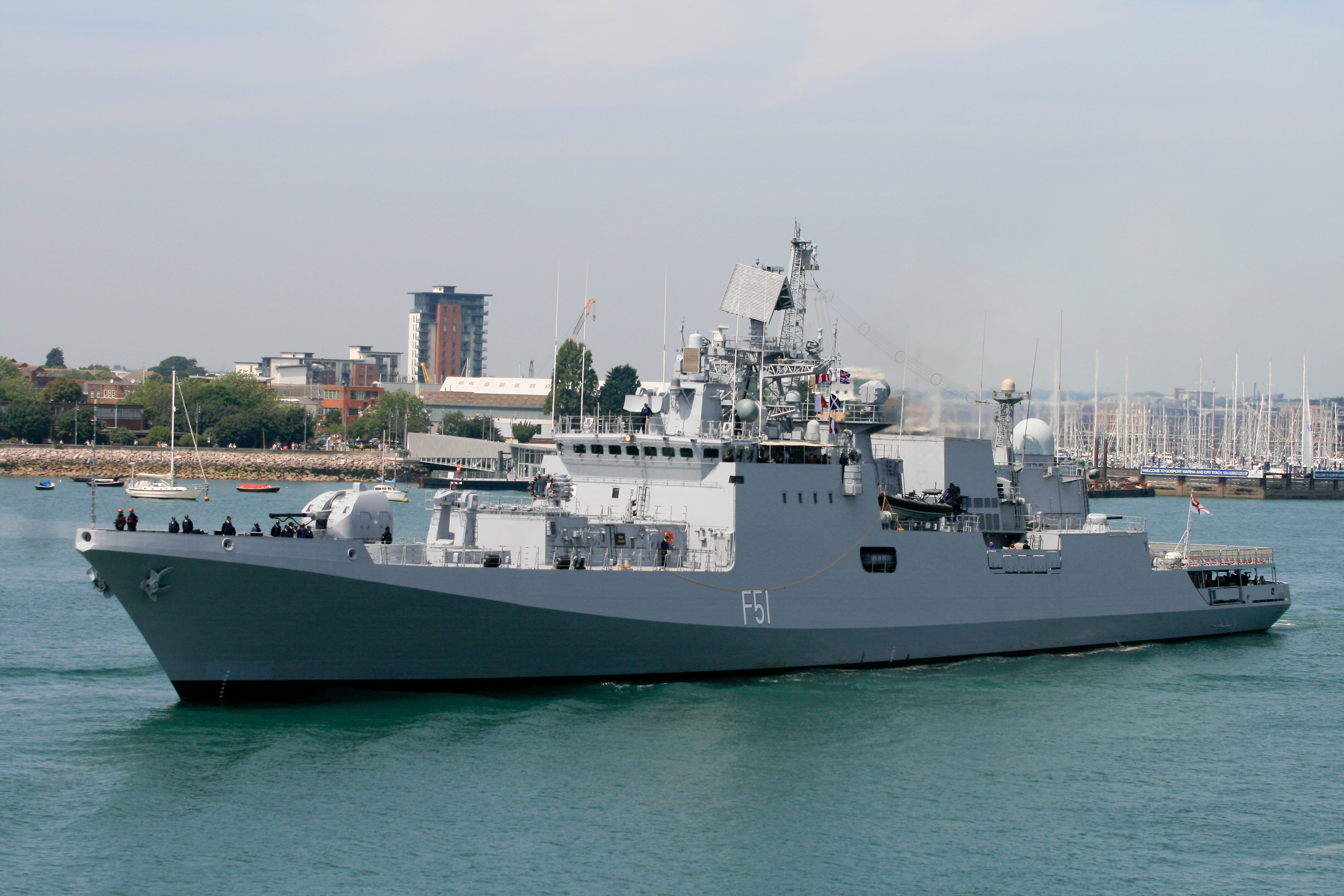
INS Trikand (F51) Portsmouth, UK, 2013

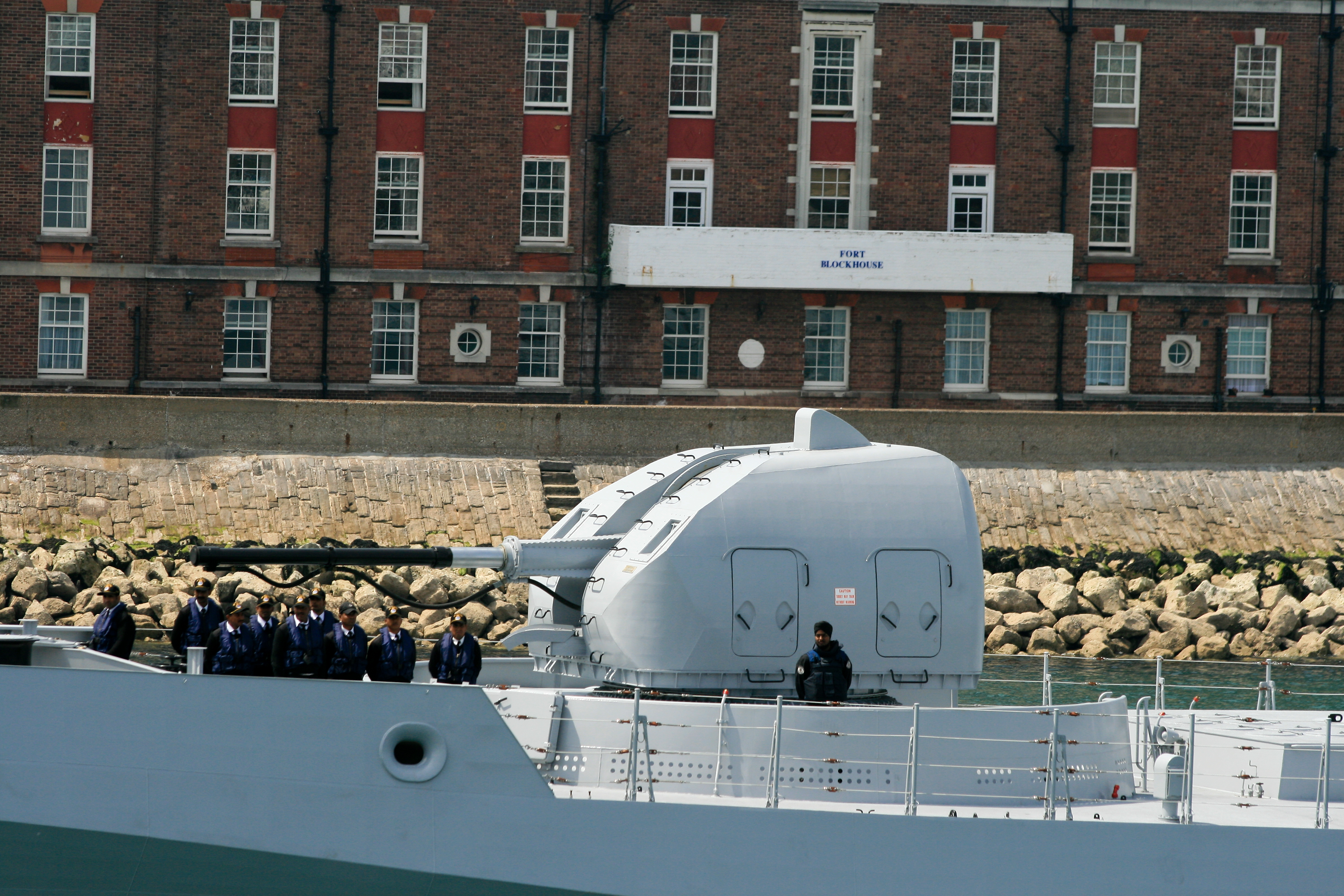
INS Trikand (F51) 100mm gun

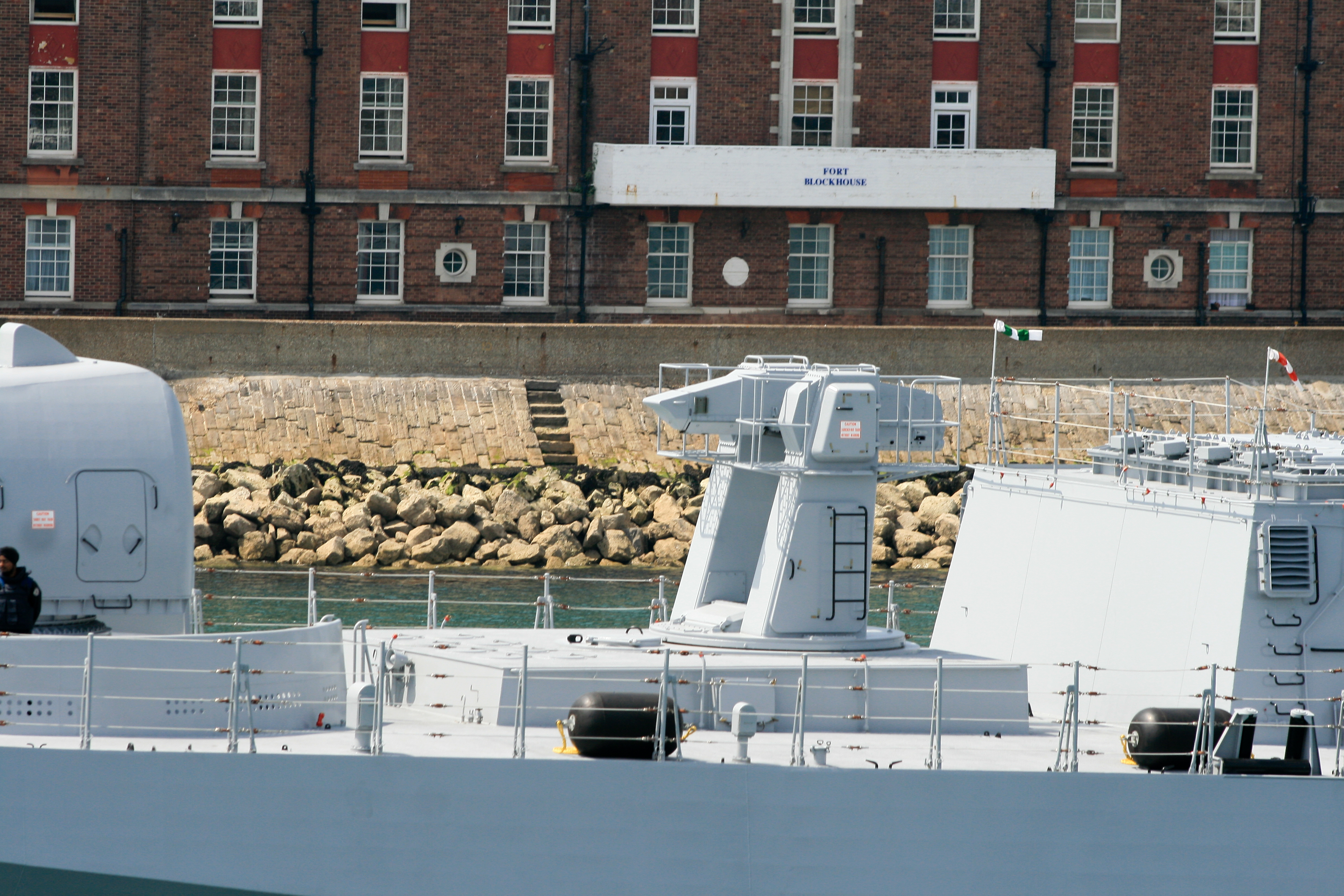
INS Trikand (F51) SAM launcher

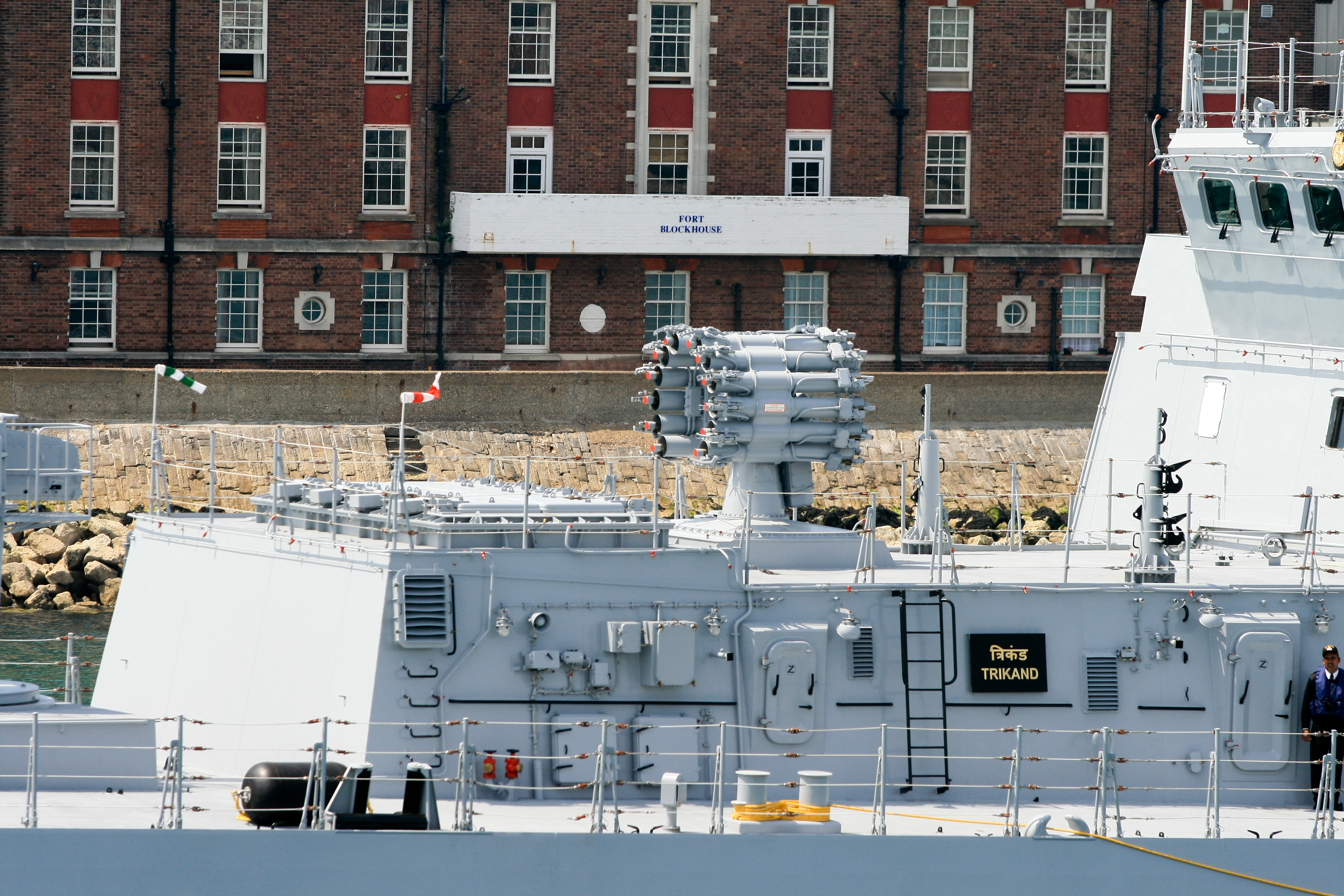
INS Trikand (F51) VLS & ASW rocket launcher

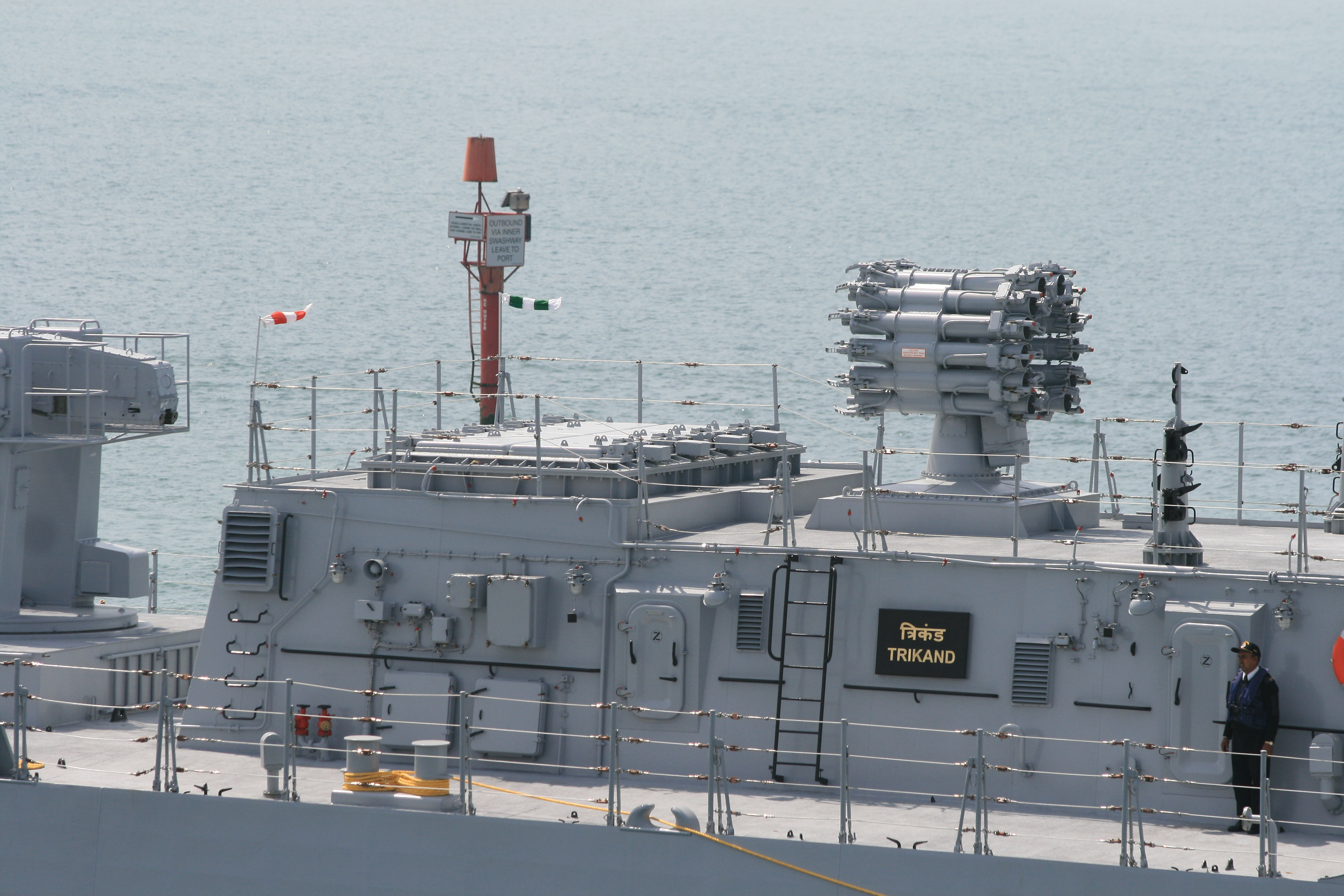
INS Trikand (F51) VLS & ASW rocket launcher

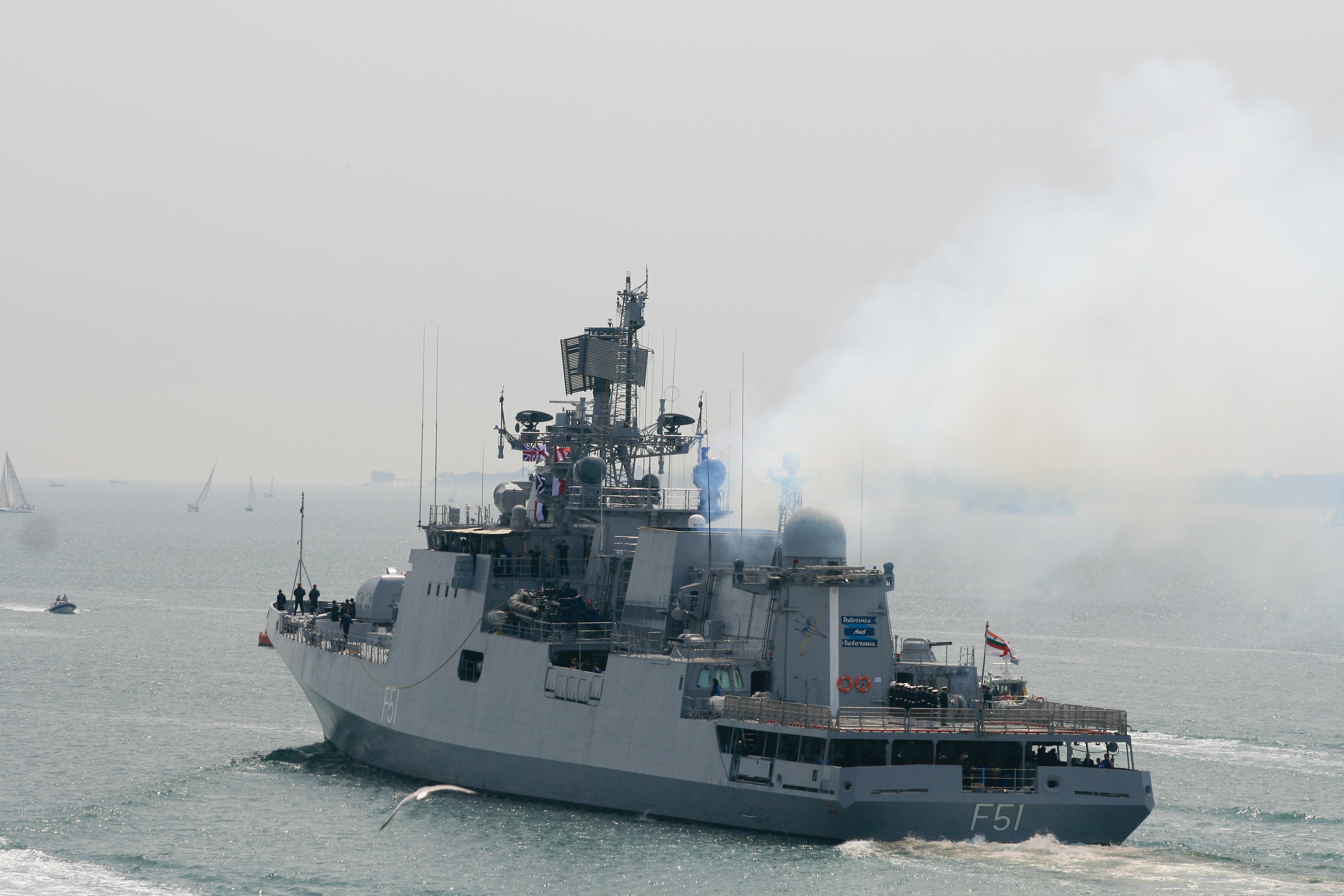
INS Trikand (F51) Flight deck & CIWS

== See also ==
- Operation Sankalp
