= Warsaw Declaration =

The Warsaw Declaration "Toward a Community of Democracies" is the founding document of the Community of Democracies. It was signed on June 27, 2000 at the building of the Polish Parliament by representatives of 106 democratic states attending the opening conference of the Community of Democracies.

== Democratic norms and principles stated in the declaration ==
The Declaration defines the practices and norms agreed as essential for the establishment and consolidation of democracy. According to the Declaration, the signing states agree to uphold the following principles:

- The right of citizens to choose their representatives through regular, free and fair elections, with universal and equal suffrage, open to multiple parties, conducted by secret ballot, monitored by independent electoral authorities, and free of fraud and intimidation.
- The right of every person to equal access to public service and to take part in the conduct of public affairs.
- The right of every person to equal protection of the law, without any discrimination as to race, color, sex, language, religion, political or other opinion, national or social origin, property, birth or other status.
- The right of every person to freedom of opinion and of expression, including to exchange and receive ideas and information through any media.
- The right of every person to freedom of thought, conscience and religion.
- The right of every person to equal access to education.
- The right of the press to collect, report and disseminate information, news and opinions, subject only to restrictions necessary in a democratic society and prescribed by law.
- The right of every person to respect for private family life, home, correspondence, including electronic communications, free of arbitrary or unlawful interference.
- The right of every person to freedom of peaceful assembly and association, including to establish or join their own political parties, civic groups, trade unions or other organizations with the necessary legal guarantees to allow them to operate freely.
- The right of persons belonging to minorities or disadvantaged groups to equal protection of the law, and the freedom to enjoy their own culture, to profess and practice their own religion, and use their own language.
- The right of every person to be free from arbitrary arrest or detention, to be free from torture and other cruel, inhumane or degrading treatment or punishment; and to receive due process of law, including to be presumed innocent until proven guilty in a court of law.
- The right of those elected to form a government, assume office and fulfill the term of office.
- The obligation of an elected government to refrain from extra-constitutional actions, to allow the holding of periodic elections and to respect their results, and to relinquish power when its legal mandate ends.
- That the aforementioned rights will be enforced by a competent, independent and impartial judiciary open to the public.
- That elected leaders uphold the law and function strictly in accordance with the constitution and procedures established by law.
- That government institutions be transparent, participatory and fully accountable, and take steps to combat corruption.
- That the legislature be elected, transparent and accountable to the people.
- That civilian, democratic control over the military be established and preserved.
- That all human right be promoted and protected.
