= Province-class fast attack craft =

Series of fast attack craft

Class overview
- Builders: Vosper Thornycroft, UK
- Operators: Royal Navy of Oman
- Succeeded by: Al-Ofouq-class patrol vessel
- Planned: 4
- Completed: 4
- Retired: 4
- Scrapped: 4

General characteristics
- Type: Fast attack craft
- Displacement: 390 tonnes
- Length: 56.70 m (186 ft) o/a
- Beam: 8.20 m (27 ft)
- Draught: 2.40 m (8 ft)
- Installed power: 17,900 hp (13,348 kW)
- Propulsion: 4 × Paxman Valenta 18RP200 diesel engines
- Speed: 38 knots (70 km/h; 44 mph)
- Range: 2,000 nmi (3,700 km; 2,300 mi) at 18 knots (33 km/h; 21 mph)
- Complement: 20
- Armament: 1 × Otobreda 76 mm 62 Super Rapid gun; 1 × two Breda 40 mm/70 anti-aircraft guns; 8 × MM40 Block 2 Exocet anti-ship missiles

The Province-class fast attack craft, also known as the Dhofar class, were a British-built series of missile-armed fast attack craft for the Royal Navy of Oman.

== Design ==
The Province class was designed and built by the British shipyard Vosper Thornycroft based on their Ramadan-class missile boat which they had built for the Egyptian Navy. The first ship of the class, Dhofar was ordered in 1980, with further ships (with slightly modified armament and equipment) ordered in 1981 and 1986.

The ships are 56.70 metres (186 ft 0 in) long overall and 52.00 metres (170 ft 7 in) between perpendiculars, with a beam of 8.20 metres (26 ft 11 in) and a draught of 2.40 metres (7 ft 10 in). Displacement is 311 long tons (316 t) light and 394 long tons (400 t) full load. They are powered by four Paxman Valenta 18RP200 diesel engines, each driving a propeller shaft, with a total power of 17,900 brake horsepower (13,300 kW), giving a speed of 40 knots (46 mph; 74 km/h). Two 80 horsepower (60 kW) electric motors are fitted for manoeuvring purposes. 45.5 tons of fuel are carried, giving a range of 2,000 nautical miles (2,300 mi; 3,700 km) at 15 knots (17 mph; 28 km/h).

The ships' main anti-ship armament is the Exocet anti-ship missile. Dhofar can carry six MM-40 Exocets missiles, while the other three ships of the class can carry eight MM-40s, in two quadruple mounts. An OTO Melara 76 mm gun is mounted forwards, while a twin Breda Bofors 40 mm gun is mounted aft. In addition, two 12.7 mm (.50 inch) machine guns are fitted.

== Ships in class ==
Ship	Date ordered	Date delivered	Decommissioned
Dhofar	1980	1982	2016
Al Sharquiyah	1981	1983	2019
Al Bat'nah	1981	1984	2019
Mussandam	1986	1989	2023
