= Qahir-class corvette =

1994 class of Oman warships

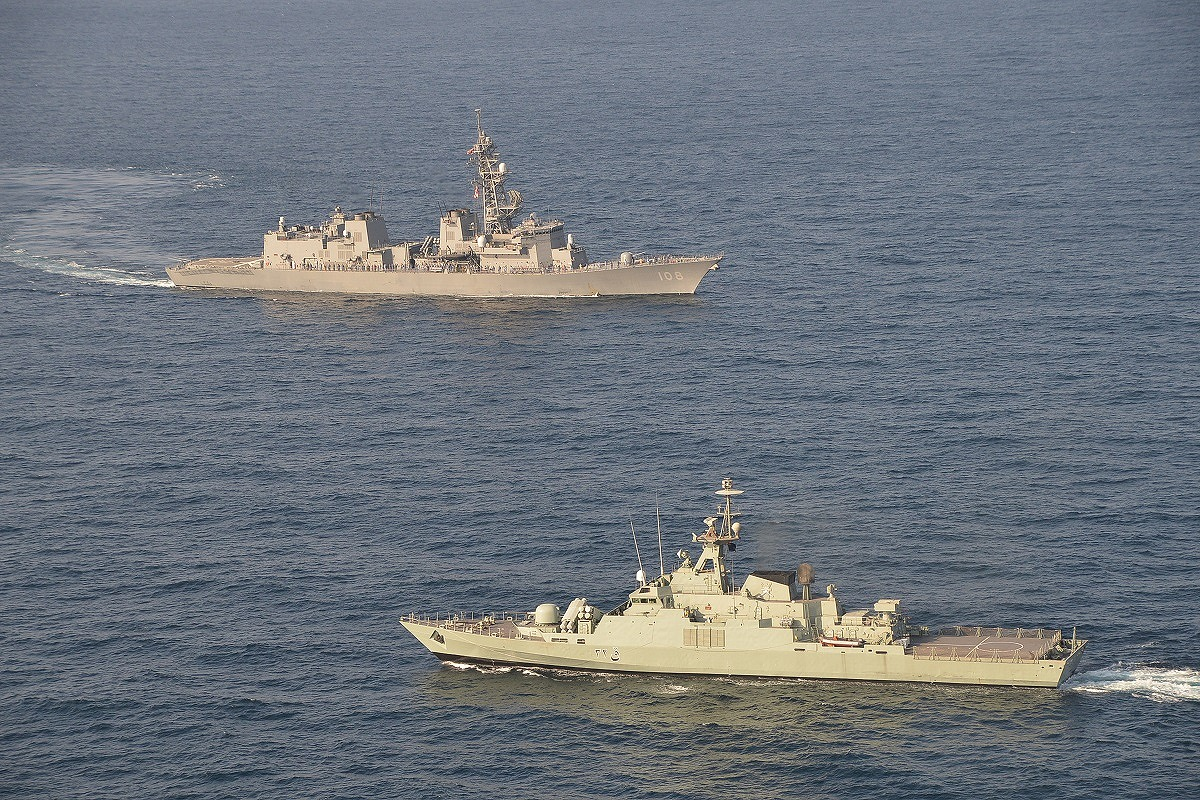
- Al Mua’zzar (lower right) during a training exercise with Japanese destroyer Akebono (upper left) in 2024

Class overview
- Builders: VT Group, UK
- Operators: Oman
- Planned: 2
- Completed: 2

General characteristics
- Class & type: Corvette
- Displacement: 1,185 long tons (1,204 t); 1,450 long tons (1,470 t) full load
- Length: 83.70 m (274 ft 7 in) oa; 78.50 m (257 ft 7 in) pp
- Beam: 11.50 m (37 ft 9 in)
- Draught: 3.50 m (11 ft 6 in)
- Propulsion: 2 shafts, 4× Crossley-SEMP-Pielstck 16PA6 V280 STC Diesels; 32,000 bhp (24,000 kW)
- Speed: 31 kn (57 km/h; 36 mph)
- Range: 5,500 nmi (10,200 km; 6,300 mi) at 12 kn (22 km/h; 14 mph)
- Crew: 60
- Sensors & processing systems: 1× Kelvin-Hughes Type 1007 Navigation radar; 1× HSA MW-08 3D air/surface search radar; 1× Thomson-CSF Castor IIJ MRR Fire control radar; 1× HSA STING radar/optical fire control
- Armament: 1× Otobreda 76 mm 62 Super Rapid gun; 2× Oerlikon GAM-BO1 20mm cannon; 1× octuple Crotale NG SAM launcher (16 missiles); 8× MM40 Block 2 Exocet anti-ship missiles

The Qahir class is a class of two corvettes designed and built by VT Group in the United Kingdom for the Royal Navy of Oman. The hull and superstructure has been designed with features including the cladding of surfaces with radar absorbent material and angled sides to reduce the radar cross section.

== Ships in class ==
Oman placed an order for two corvettes from Vosper Thornycroft as part of Project Muheet on 5 April 1992, work beginning in September 1992. The two ships were completed in 1996, with the final ship, Al Mua'zzar being delivered to Oman and commissioned in 1997.

Ship	Pennant Number	Laid Down	Date Launched	Date Commissioned
Qahir Al Amwaj	C 31	17 May 1993	21 September 1994	3 September 1996
Al Mua'zzar	C 32	4 April 1994	26 September 1995	13 April 1997

== See also ==
- Khareef-class corvette

== Notes and references ==
- Baker, A.D. (1998), The Naval Institute Guide to Combat Fleets of the World 1998–1999, Annapolis, Maryland, USA: Naval Institute Press, ISBN 1-55750-111-4
- Saunders, Stephen, Jane's Fighting Ships 2002–2003, Coulsdon, Surry, UK: Jane's Information Group, ISBN 0710624328
- Todd, Daniel; Lindberg, Michael (1996), Navies and Shipbuilding Industries: The Strained Symbiosis, Greenwood Publishing, ISBN 978-0-275-95310-2
