= Omani ship Al Dhaferah =

Omani amphibious transport ship

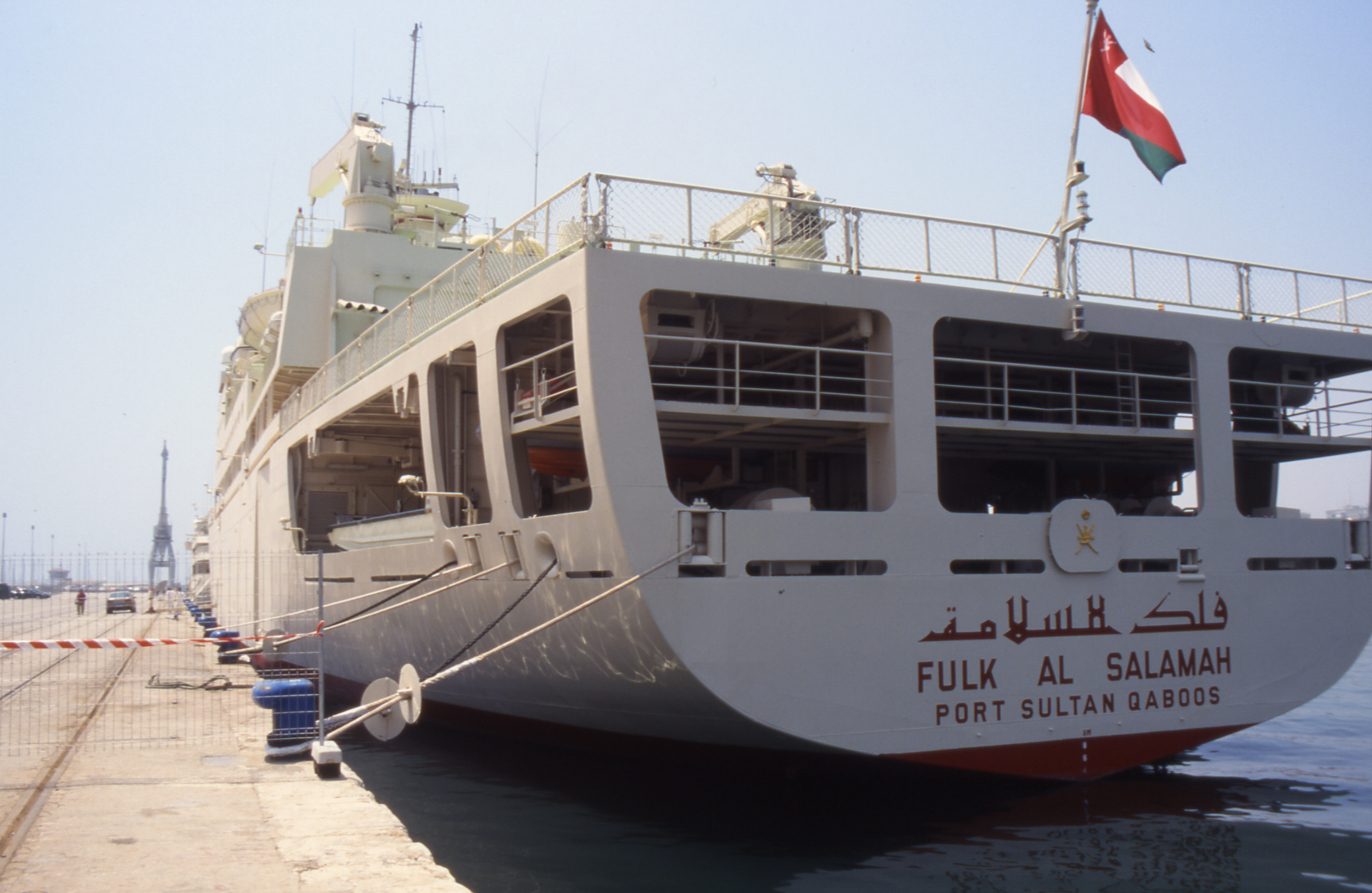
- Al Dhaferah in Málaga, Spain

History

Oman
- Builder: Bremer Vulkan
- Laid down: 17 January 1986
- Launched: 29 August 1986
- In service: 3 April 1987
- Out of service: 2024
- Identification: IMO number: 8509026; MMSI number: 461000500; Callsign: A4JZ
- Fate: scrapped

General characteristics
- Type: Amphibious transport ship
- Tonnage: 10,864 GT
- Length: 125 m (410 ft)
- Beam: 14.3 m (47 ft)
- Draught: 5.8 m (19 ft)
- Propulsion: Diesel-electric, producing 16,800 bhp (12.5 MW)
- Speed: 19.5 knots (36.1 km/h; 22.4 mph)
- Complement: 240 troops
- Aircraft carried: Hangar and flight deck for two Super Puma helicopters

Al Dhaferah was an amphibious transport ship in service with the Royal Navy of Oman since her construction in 1987. The vessel was capable of transporting 240 troops and worked alongside the royal yacht.

The vessel was previously named Fulk Al Salamah, but was renamed Al Dhaferah in 2016 after the delivery of the new Fulk Al Salamah.
