= Council for a Community of Democracies =

- Abbreviation: CCD
- Formation: 2001
- Purpose: Secretariat of the International Steering Committee of the Community of Democracies
- Headquarters: Washington D.C.

Council for a Community of Democracies is a Washington, D.C.–based NGO which was established in order to promote global interest in and support for the Community of Democracies, improved relationships among democracies, and democratic transitions in general. It was established in 2001.

Since the Santiago Ministerial Meeting of the Community of Democracies (2005), CCD has also served as the Secretariat for the International Steering Committee of the Non-Governmental Process for the CD. The ISC/CD is 20 to 25 representative NGO leaders from around the world, from both CD countries and non-democracies, who coordinate civil society concerns and communicate with the CD governments, represented by the Convening Group Ambassadors and "sherpas" who meet to prepare for and follow up on the CD Ministerials.
