= World Economy and International Relations =

- Discipline: Economics, International relations
- Language: Russian

Publication details
- History: 1957; 69 years ago to present
- Publisher: Institute of World Economy and International Relations

Standard abbreviations
- ISO 4: World Econ. Int. Relat.

Indexing
- ISSN: 0131-2227

World Economy and International Relations (Russian: Мировая экономика и международные отношения) is the flagship journal of the IMEMO Institute in Moscow published from 1957. The journal is indexed in Russian Science Citation Index.
