= Community of Democracies =

Intergovernmental organization

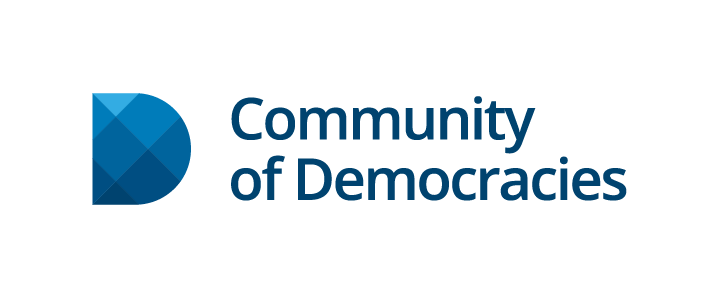
- Logo used since June 2018
- Headquarters: Warsaw, Poland
- Type: Intergovernmental Coalition of States
- Members of the Governing Council: 30 member states

Leaders
  - Presidency: Executive Committee (EC)
  - Secretary General: Mantas Adomėnas
- Establishment: 2000
- Website www.community-democracies.org

The Community of Democracies (C.O.D), established in 2000, is an intergovernmental coalition of states. Its aim is to bring together governments, civil society and the private sector in the pursuit of the common goal of supporting democratic rules, expanding political participation, advancing and protecting democratic freedoms, and strengthening democratic norms and institutions around the world. The Warsaw Declaration had outlined the task of promoting democracy. It is disputed if the coalition qualifies as an International Organization in the legal sense.

== History ==
The C.O.D was inaugurated at its first biennial ministerial conference hosted by the government of Poland in Warsaw on June 25 to June 27, 2000. The initiative was spearheaded by Polish Foreign Minister Bronisław Geremek and U.S. Secretary of State Madeleine Albright, along with six co-conveners: the governments of Chile, the Czech Republic, India, Mali, Portugal and the Republic of Korea. In total, 106 nations signed the declaration.

At the close of the conference the participating governments signed onto the Warsaw Declaration, agreeing to "respect and uphold core democratic principles and practices" including, among others, free and fair elections, freedom of speech and expression, equal access to education, rule of law, and freedom of peaceful assembly.

== Structure ==
The C.O.D works on the base of the Warsaw Declaration. Currently, their work is more specifically guided by the Community's Strategic Plan for 2024-2028 which identified the following strategic objectives:

- Strengthening Adherence to the Warsaw Declaration
- Increase Dialogue on the Challenges and Opportunities to Democracy

and thematic areas: fostering democratic resilience, youth empowerment, enabling and protecting civil society, and advancing women's political participation.

Their internal structure include regular Ministerial Conferences, Governing Council, Presidency, Permanent Secretariat headed by the Secretary General, three Working Groups and Civil Society Pillar.

Currently, the Governing Council consists of the following Member States: Argentina, Canada, Chile, Costa Rica, El Salvador, Estonia, Finland, Georgia, Guatemala, Hungary, India, Italy, Japan, Lithuania, Mexico, Moldova, Mongolia, Morocco, Nigeria, North Macedonia, Norway, Panama, Poland, Portugal, Republic of Korea, Romania, Sweden, United Kingdom, United States of America, and Uruguay.

=== Presidency ===
The current presidency is held by Poland (as of January 2025). Previous Presidency was held by Canada (2022-2023) Romania (2019-2022), South Korea (2001-2003), Chile (2003-2005), Mali (2005-2007), Portugal (2007- 2009), Lithuania (2009-2011), Mongolia (2011-2013), El Salvador (2013-2015), United States of America (2015-2017). Between Sept 2017-Sept 2019, the C.O.D was led by a collective chairmanship of the C.O.D Executive Committee.

Ministerial Conferences were held towards the end of each presidency term in the capital of the presiding state, resulting in the adoption of a common declaration (plan of action) towards the following activities of the Community. The conferences were held in: Warsaw 2000 (Poland), Seoul 2002 (South Korea), Santiago 2005 (Chile), Bamako 2007 (Mali), Lisbon 2009 (Portugal), Vilnius 2011 (Lithuania), Ulaanbaatar 2013 (Mongolia), San Salvador 2015 (El Salvador) and Washington D.C. 2017 (United States of America), and a virtual format in 2020 due to the pandemic. .

=== Permanent Secretariat ===
Since 2009, a Permanent Secretariat of the C.O.D operates in Warsaw, providing technical, logistical, organizational and administrative support to all its bodies. The current head of the Permanent Secretariat and Secretary General of the C.O.D is Dr. Mantas Adomenas (as of September 2024).

=== Working Groups ===
Working Groups (WG) are action-oriented structures that drive the implementation of the strategic objectives of the Community of Democracies. WGs are composed of states, civil society representatives, and other democracy stakeholders. WG mandates are approved by the Governing Council, and they supported and coordinated by the Permanent Secretariat of the Community of Democracies. Currently, there are three Working Groups:

- Working Group on Enabling and Protecting Civil Society
- Working Group on Women and Democracy
- Working Group on Democracy and Technology

=== Affiliated bodies ===
==== Civil Society Pillar ====
The Civil Society Pillar (also Civil Society Assembly) refers to the non-governmental process of the C.O.D, including civil society organizations, foundations, and experts devoted to promoting democracy. It is represented by the non-governmental "International Steering Committee" (ISC), which is composed of 26 leaders of civil society organizations from all regions of the world, the Chair and Vice-Chair and the organization which serves as the ISC's secretariat. In April 2018, Fundacion Multitudes was elected as the first Permanent Secretariat of the CSP and Paulina Ibarra as Chair of the ISC. Since September 2022, the ISC is chaired by Enrique de Obarrio of REDLAD Latin American and Caribbean Network for Democracy. The ISC advises governments on the actions needed to enable civil society to work freely to strengthen democracy, rule of law, and protection for the fundamental rights enshrined in the Warsaw Declaration. The ISC coordinates a variety of initiatives for civil society, including the civil society forum taking place in the biannual Ministerial Conferences of the Community, which results in a set of recommendations to the Ministerial Declaration made by civil society representatives.

== Other activities ==
Examples of current activities:

=== Youth Democracy Network ===
In 2024, the C.O.D. launched the Youth Democracy Network initiative, which aims to support young leaders committed to advancing democracy, human rights, and fundamental freedoms, and seeks to provide tools, resources, and opportunities for young people to engage with decision-makers and contribute meaningfully to democratic systems.

=== Countering Foreign Information Manipulations Research Publications ===
In 2024, the C.O.D. published research publications on countering foreign information manipulations (FIMI). The reports outline the global threat of FIMI and aim to help diplomats address the threat of FIMI during their service abroad.

Examples of past activities:

=== Myanmar Constitutional Democracy Project ===
In 2018, the C.O.D finalized the Phase III of the Myanmar Constitutional Democracy Project, implemented cooperation with Australia-Myanmar Constitutional Democracy Project, that aimed to facilitate an inclusive constitutional framework, through embracing all stakeholders within society and providing them with the necessary legal tools and language to engage in the process of drafting and amending it. In 2018, the C.O.D published a Building a Democratic Constitutional Culture in Myanmar booklet, which contains a summary of fundamental principles and concepts of constitutional democracy with a particular focus on those most relevant to the situation in Myanmar. Together with the two constitutional democracy workshops, held in Myanmar in February 2018, the booklet constitutes an effort to increase the capacity of key stakeholders to participate in the process of democratic reforms in Myanmar, extend their knowledge on constitutional matters, as well as to contribute to the development and support of a culture of constitutionalism in Myanmar.

=== Advancing Women's Political Participation ===
To support women's participation in politics, the Community of Democracies created a project called "Advancing Women's Political Participation", aiming to implement it in cooperation with the United Nations Development Programme (UNDP) and International IDEA. As part of the project, five regional consultations were held on the margins of large international democracy-related events in Europe, Asia, Africa and Latin America. Consultation brought together politicians, state officials, civil society activists, academics, and members of international and regional organizations to discuss gender equality and strategies for advancing women's political empowerment in the MENA region. The project's five regional reports and final report contain specific policy recommendations on the advancement of women's political participation in each region.

== See also ==
- Atlantic Union
- Community of Democratic Choice
- Community for Democracy and Human Rights
- Council for a Community of Democracies
- GUAM Organization for Democracy and Economic Development
- International Institute for Democracy and Electoral Assistance (IDEA)
- United Nations Parliamentary Assembly
