= International Cotton Advisory Committee =

International organization

International Cotton Advisory Committee Comité Consultatif International du Coton Comité Consultivo Internacional del Algodón
- Abbreviation: ICAC/CCIC/CCIA
- Formation: September 1939
- Type: International commodity body
- Purpose: Trade and production
- Headquarters: Washington, DC, United States of America
- Location: 1629 K Street NW, Suite 702, Washington, DC 20006 USA
- Region served: World cotton industry
- Members: 29 members
- Official language: English, French, Spanish, summaries in Arabic and Russian
- Chair of the Standing Committee: Mr Ali Tahir
- Main organ: Standing Committee (4-5 meetings per year), ICAC Secretariat
- Budget: About US$2 million
- Staff: Nine
- Website: www.icac.org

The International Cotton Advisory Committee (ICAC) is an association of governments of cotton producing, consuming and trading countries which acts as the international commodity body for cotton and cotton textiles.

== Structure and history ==
Founded at the International Cotton Meeting in Washington, DC in 1939, the ICAC advocates for cotton producing nations, publishes studies and technical information on the cotton industry, and holds an annual Plenary Meeting of member states. While most of the world's cotton producing nations are members, two of the ten largest producers (The People's Republic of China and Turkmenistan) are not members of the ICAC. All of the top five cotton exporting nations are members.

The International Cotton Advisory Committee (ICAC) along with private sector cotton organizations initiated the International Forum for Cotton Promotion (IFCP) in 2000. The IFCP serves as a forum and clearinghouse for the exchange of proven cotton promotion techniques. The IFCP facilitates domestically focused and domestically funded cotton promotion programs.

== Member states ==
Member nations and date joining:

1. Argentina May 1946
2. Australia May 1946
3. Bangladesh February 1917
4. Brazil September 1939
5. Burkina Faso October 1997
6. Cameroon August 1969
7. Chad March 1967
8. Cote d'Ivoire August 1973
9. Egypt September 1939
10. European Union May 2017
11. India Sept 1939
12. Kazakhstan Sept 2006
13. Kenya July 2007
14. South Korea (Republic of Korea) Mar 1954
15. Mali July 1996
16. Mozambique Sept 2010
17. Nigeria Sept 1972
18. Pakistan Jul 1948
19. Russia Feb 1962 (as USSR: Sept 1939)
20. South Africa July 1991
21. Sudan Sept 1939
22. Switzerland Jan 1951
23. Taiwan Feb 1963
24. Togo Sept 1999
25. Turkey Nov 1947
26. Uganda Nov 1962
27. United States Sept 1939 - Jan 2026
28. Uzbekistan Sept 1992
29. Zimbabwe Apr 1991

== See also ==
- Cotton#International trade
- Textile manufacturing#Processing of cotton
- International Year of Natural Fibres
