= Royal Navy of Oman =

Naval warfare branch of the Royal Armed Forces of the Sultanate of Oman

- البحرية السلطانية العمانية
- Seal of the Royal Navy of Oman
- Founded: origin 807 CE. formal 1650 CE. 1970 (official)
- Country: Oman
- Type: Navy
- Size: 4,200 personnel
- Garrison/HQ: Muratafat Al Matar Muscat
- Colors: Blue and Yellow
- Equipment: 5 corvettes 12 patrol vessels 3 amphibious warfare vessels 2 auxiliary ships

Commanders
- Supreme Commander: Sultan Haitham bin Tariq
- Minister of Defense: Shihab bin Tariq Al Said
- Armed Forces Chief of Staff: Vice Adm. Abdullah bin Khamis bin Abdullah Al Raisi
- Commander of the RNO: Rear Adm. Saif bin Nasser bin Mohsin Al Rahbi

Insignia
- Naval ensign of Oman

- Naval jack of Oman

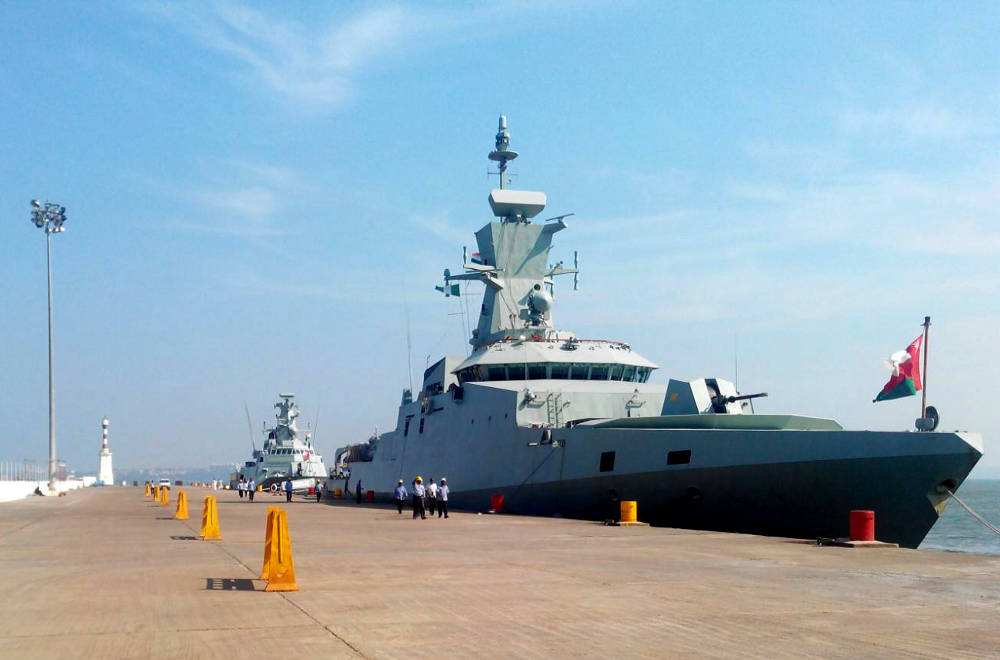
RNOV Al-Shamikh, (nearest) a modern corvette and RNOV Al-Seeb, a fast attack craft moored in Goa harbour in 2016

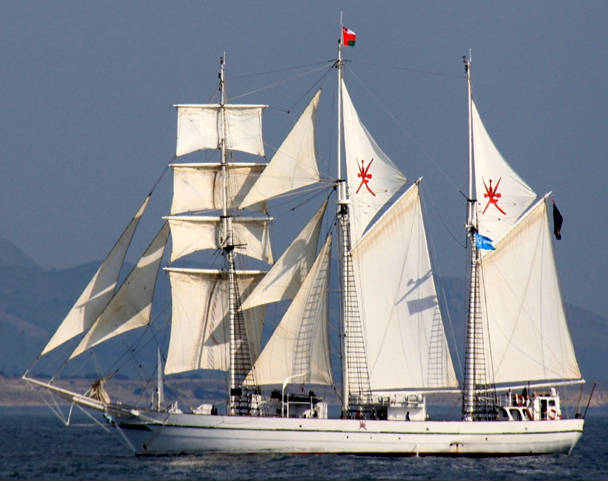
The RNO's sail training ship Shebab Oman

The Royal Navy of Oman (Arabic: البحرية السلطانية العمانية), abbreviated RNO, is the maritime component of the Sultan's Armed Forces of the Sultanate of Oman. Given its long coastline and strategic location along the Indian Ocean, as well as being close to the Strait of Hormuz, the Royal Navy is one of the priorities of the government of Oman. It has a fleet of gunboats, fast missile boats and support, training, cargo and hydro-graphical survey vessels, which can be deployed to defend the territorial waters and coastline of Oman as well as protect tankers passing through the Strait of Hormuz. The Royal Navy's headquarters are in Seeb, near the Muscat International Airport. A modernization program is ongoing, with the objective of creating a first-rate fleet. Similarly, the Royal Oman Police's fleet, which operates smaller range boats and patrol craft, is being updated due to rising tensions in the region.

The origin of the Royal Navy of Oman is traceable to the reign of Imam Ghassan bin Abdullah (807–824 CE). He was the first ruler of Oman to possess a navy, with a standing royal navy of Oman being formally established in 1650.

== History ==
The origin of the Royal Navy of Oman can be traced to the reign of Imam Ghassan bin Abdullah (807–824 CE). He was the first ruler of Oman to possess a navy. He commissioned ships in order to fend off pirates operating along the western shores of the Indian Ocean who were conducting raids along the coast of the Arabian Peninsula.

The Omani Navy dominated the Western Indian Ocean for many years thereafter until the arrival of the Portuguese that changed the balance of sea power in the region. Beginning in 1508 with the invasion of Oman by the Portuguese the conflict came to end in 1515 with the loss of Oman’s maritime trade routes.

Beginning in 1624, Oman started to recover its lost naval ports under Nasir bin Murshid (1624–1649), and Sultan bin Saif (1649–1688); the objective of the Omani navy, to force out the Portuguese from their bases in Oman, was achieved by 1650.

The Royal Oman Navy fell into another period of neglect until the reign of Ahmed bin Said. (1749–1783). He began to rebuild the Omani Navy and had commissioned a fleet of four ships, that were equipped with 40 guns. Additionally, he had 25 coastal boats built. A stronger navy was rebuilt between the seventeenth and nineteenth centuries. Its main purpose was to then protect Oman’s overseas territories.

During the reign of Sultan Said bin Sultan (1806–1856) the navy grew larger. The Sultan had sent several Royal Omani Navy ships on specific commercial and diplomatic visits, first to New York in 1840 the Al Sultanah transported Ahmed bin Al-Noman Al-Ka’abi who was the first Arab envoy sent to the United States.

From 1862, the Sultanate of Oman lapsed again into a period of steady decline due to internal political wrangling and along with it the Royal Oman Navy. In 1888 Oman became a protectorate of the British Empire, which it would remain for almost 100 years. In 1962, the Dhofar Rebellion erupted, pitting communist insurgents against the Omani government. Although small, the Omani Navy undertook an important role in this conflict by providing naval gunfire support and bombarding insurgent positions inland.

During the late 1960s, the Royal Oman Navy existed as the naval branch of the Sultan’s Armed Forces (SAF) instead of as a separate standing navy. In 1971 the British Protectorate of Oman came to an end, and following the discovery of oil fields leading to the sale of oil abroad, that provided much-needed investment in modernizing the navy and growing the existing fleet.

The main naval base moved from Sultan Bin Ahmed Naval Base in Muscat to Said bin Sultan Naval Base in Wudam Al Sahil, near Al-Musannah, which opened in 1988. One of the largest engineering projects in Oman, it serves as a homeport for the fleet and includes training facilities as well as repair bays. The Sultan Qaboos Naval Academy, located at the base, provided instruction for officers and enlisted personnel, as well as specific branch training. Originally, most of the officers were British, with non-commissioned officers being mostly Pakistani. However, by 1980, most of the officers were Omani, though British technicians remained. In 1992, the Royal Oman Navy had a strength of 3,000 personnel.

The Royal Oman Navy does not have a marine corps or any naval infantry formations, though it has multiple amphibious warfare ships. A modernization program is ongoing in order to protect the coastline as well as the strategically important Strait of Hormuz. The British Royal Navy, in 2011, helped train corvette crews with its Flag Officer Sea Training.

== Ships ==
Class	Photo	Type	Displacement	Ships	Hull Number	Builder	Launched	Commissioned	Note
Corvettes (5)
Khareef class		Corvette	2,660 tons	Al Shamikh	Q40	BAE Systems	22 July 2009	October 2013	8 MM-40 anti-ship missiles, 12 VL Mica anti-aircraft missiles
Khareef class		Corvette	2,660 tons	Al Rahmani	Q41	BAE Systems	23 July 2010	March 2014	8 MM-40 anti-ship missiles, 12 VL Mica anti-aircraft missiles
Khareef class		Corvette	2,660 tons	Al Rasikh	Q42	BAE Systems	27 June 2011	May 2014	8 MM-40 anti-ship missiles, 12 VL Mica anti-aircraft missiles
Qahir class	Royal Oman Navy corvette Al Mua'zzar	Corvette	1,450 tons	Qahir Al Amwaj	C31 (ex Q31)	Vosper Thornycroft	21 September 1994	3 September 1996	8 MM-40 anti-ship missiles, 1 × 8 Crotale anti-aircraft missiles Muheet Project
Qahir class	Royal Oman Navy corvette Al Mua'zzar	Corvette	1,450 tons	Al Mua'zzar	C32 (ex Q32)	Vosper Thornycroft	26 September 1995	13 April 1997	8 MM-40 anti-ship missiles, 1 × 8 Crotale anti-aircraft missiles Muheet Project
Patrol Vessels (8 in service)
Al-Ofouq class		Patrol vessel	1,100 tons	Al-Seeb	Z20	ST Marine	29 January 2014	31 March 2015	1 × 76 mm Oto Melara cannon, 2 × 30 mm Oto Melara Marlin-WS
Al-Ofouq class		Patrol vessel	1,100 tons	Al-Shinas	Z21	ST Marine	14 June 2014		1 × 76 mm Oto Melara cannon, 2 × 30 mm Oto Melara Marlin-WS
Al-Ofouq class		Patrol vessel	1,100 tons	Sadh	Z22	ST Marine	17 September 2014		1 × 76 mm Oto Melara cannon, 2 × 30 mm Oto Melara Marlin-WS
Al-Ofouq class		Patrol vessel	1,100 tons	Khassab	Z23	ST Marine	24 June 2016	2 August 2016	1 × 76 mm Oto Melara cannon, 2 × 30 mm Oto Melara Marlin-WS
Al Bushra class		Patrol vessel	475 tons	Al Bushra	B1 (ex Z1)	CMN		1995	Mawj Project
Al Bushra class		Patrol vessel	475 tons	Al Mansoor	B2 (ex Z2)	CMN		1995	Mawj Project
Al Bushra class		Patrol vessel	475 tons	Al Najah	B3 (ex Z3)	CMN		1996	Mawj Project
Al Mabrukah class		Patrol ship	785 tons	Al Mabrukah	Q30 (ex A1)	Brooke Marine	7 April 1970	1971	Former royal yacht converted to training ship; serving as a patrol ship since 1997
Amphibious Ships (2 in service)
Nasr al Bahr class		Landing Ship Tank	2,500 tons full load	Nasr al Bahr	L2	Brooke Marine	1984	1985	Equipped with helicopter deck. Capacity for 7 tanks; 240 troops. Laid down in 1982.
Al Sultana class				Al Sultana	A2	Netherlands		1975	
Auxiliaries (2 in service)
Al Mubshir class		High speed support vessel		Al Mubshir	S11	Austal	20 October 2015	20 May 2016	250 troops, 69 crew, cargo capacity of 320 tonnes (350 short tons), 35 knot speed.
Al Mubshir class		High speed support vessel		Al Naasir	S12	Austal	April 2016	8 September 2016	

=== Missiles ===
- 50 VT-1 Crotale NG SAMs
- 162 Exocet MM-40 (122 Block-1+ 40 Block-2)
- Exocet MM-38
- Harpoon Block-II
- VL Mica-SAM

=== Electronics ===
- MASS Ship protection system
- 3 x SMART-S MK-II Ship sensors
- 2 x MW-8 Air search radar
- 5 x Sting fire control radar
- 2 x DRBV-51C fire control radar
- 3 x RA-20S air search radar
- 4 x 9LV radar
- 3 x CEROS-200 radar

== Future ==
=== New Research Vessel ===
The Royal Navy of Oman (RNO) has contracted with the US Pentagon through a Foreign Military Sales (FMS) program to provide a new research vessel based on the RV F.G. Walton Smith, a University of Miami vessel. DeJong & Lebet, Naval Architects, provided the US Navy with Contract Drawings and Engineering.

Thoma-Sea Shipbuilders of Lockport, Louisiana reportedly won a $7.3m contract to build a Catamaran Hull Hydrographic Survey Vessel for the government of Oman, according to a report. This vessel will be built by Thoma-Sea. Thoma-Sea’s partner in this proposal is Technology Associates Inc. (TAI) of New Orleans in Louisiana. TAI prepared the proposal for Thoma-Sea and will be in charge of performing the Design, Program Management and Integrated Logistics Support (ILS) functions for Thoma-Sea. The Sultanate of Oman will receive this 90-foot vessel, which is designed to conduct hydrographic and environmental surveys of harbors and bays, and will work in Oman’s territorial waters, according to the release.

Oman has also issued RFI for a new ‘hydrographic survey vessel’. US Naval Sea Systems Command is promoting ship design based on the Walton Smith Catamaran design.

In Oman, South Korean defence minister Song Young-moo met with his counterpart Sayyid Badr bin Saud bin Harib Al Busaidi. They spoke highly about the South Korean destroyers, Oman signed a deal in 2018 for an unknown number of ships and other arms including tanks.

=== Training vessel ===
On 5 February 2026, the Royal Navy of Oman placed an order for a training ship with the Swan Defence and Heavy Industries Limited. The ship, to be delivered in 18 months, will measure 104.25 m (342.0 ft) in length, 13.88 m (45.5 ft) in beam and will displace 3,500 tonnes. The ship will be equipped with state-of-the-art navigation system, communication suite, helicopter deck. The vessel will accommodate up to 70 cadets with modern classrooms and training offices.

== Former ships ==
- Four Brooke Marine patrol craft
- Province class: Dhofar (B10), Al Sharquiyah (B11), Al Bat'nah (B12), Mussandam (B14) (served between 1982 and 2023, and scrapped afterwards)
- Fulk al Salamah (L3): Amphibious transport (served between 1987 and 2024, and scrapped afterwards)

== Ranks ==
=== Commissioned officer ranks ===
The rank insignia of commissioned officers.

Rank group	General / flag officers					Senior officers			Junior officers
Royal Navy of Oman
Royal Navy of Oman	مشیر; Mushir	فريق أول; Fariq 'awal	فريق; Fariq	لواء; Liwa	عميد; Amid	عقيد; Aqid	مقدم; Muqaddam	رائد; Ra'id	نقيب; Naqib	ملازم أول; Mulazim awwal	ملازم; Mulazim

=== Other ranks ===
The rank insignia of non-commissioned officers and enlisted personnel.

Rank group	Senior NCOs				Junior NCOs		Enlisted
Royal Navy of Oman
Royal Navy of Oman	وكيل أول; Wakil 'awal	وكيل; Wakil	رقيب أول; Raqib 'awal	رقيب; Raqib	عريف; Earif	نائب عريف; Nayib earif

== See also ==
- Qahir Al Amwaj
