= ASEAN–India Free Trade Area =

International free trade area since 2010

The ASEAN–India Free Trade Area (AIFTA) is a free trade area among the ten member states of the Association of Southeast Asian Nations (ASEAN) and the Republic of India. The initial framework agreement was signed on 8 October 2003 in Bali, Indonesia. and the final agreement was on 13 August 2009. The free trade area came into effect on 1 January 2010. India hosted the latest ASEAN-India Commemorative Summit in New Delhi on 26 January 2018. In the financial year 2017–18, Indo-ASEAN bilateral trade grew by almost 14% to reach US$81.3 billion. India's imports from ASEAN were valued at US$47.13 billion while its exports to ASEAN stood at US$34.2 billion.

== Background ==
The ASEAN–India Free Area emerged from a mutual interest of both parties to expand their economic ties in the Asia-Pacific region. India's Look East policy was reciprocated by similar interests of many ASEAN countries to expand their interactions westward.

After India became a sectoral dialogue partner of ASEAN in 1992, India saw its trade with ASEAN increase relative to its trade with the rest of the world. Between 1993 and 2003, ASEAN-India bilateral trade grew at an annual rate of 11.2%, from US$2.9 billion in 1993 to US$12.1 billion in 2003. Much of India's trade with ASEAN is directed towards Singapore, Malaysia, and Thailand, with whom India holds strong economic relations.

In 2008, the total volume of ASEAN-India trade was US$47.5 billion. ASEAN's export to India was US$30.1 billion – a growth of 21.1 per cent in comparison with that of 2007. ASEAN's imports from India were US$17.4 billion – a growth of 40.2 per cent in comparison to that of 2006. As for foreign direct investment (FDI), the inflow from India to ASEAN Member States was US$476.8 million in 2008, accounting for 0.8 per cent of total FDI in the region. Total Indian FDI into ASEAN from 2000 to 2008 was US$1.3 billion. The ASEAN-Dialogue Partners trade and investment statistic data can be accessed through http://www.asean.org/22122.htm.

Acknowledging this trend and recognising the economic potential of closer linkages, both sides recognised the opportunities for deepening trade and investment ties, and agreed to negotiate a framework agreement to pave the way for the establishment of an ASEAN–India Free Trade Area (FTA).

== History ==
At the Second ASEAN-India Summit in 2003, the ASEAN-India Framework Agreement on Comprehensive Economic Cooperation was signed by the Leaders of ASEAN and India. The Framework Agreement laid a sound basis for the eventual establishment of an ASEAN-India Regional Trade and Investment Area (RTIA), which includes FTA in goods, services, and investment.

ASEAN and India signed the ASEAN-India Trade in Goods (TIG) Agreement in Bangkok on 13 August 2009, after six years of negotiations. The ASEAN-India TIG Agreement entered into force on 1 January 2010. The 7th ASEAN-India Summit in Cha-am Hua Hin, Thailand on 24 October 2009 agreed to revise the bilateral trade target to US$70 billion to be achieved in the next two years, noting that the initial target of US$50 billion set in 2007 may soon be surpassed.

ASEAN-India trade grew at over 22 percent annually during the 2005-2011 period. Trade between India and ASEAN in 1964-2002 increased by more than 37 percent to $79 billion, which was more than the target of $70 billion set in 2009.

At the 10th ASEAN-India Summit in New Delhi on 20 December 2012, India and ASEAN concluded negotiations for FTAs in services and investments. The two sides expect bilateral trade to increase to $100 billion by 2015, and $200 billion within a decade.

ASEAN and India are also working on enhancing private sector engagement. Details on the re-activation of the ASEAN-India Business Council (AIBC), the holding of the ASEAN-India Business Summit (AIBS) and an ASEAN-India Business Fair (AIBF), are being worked out by officials. On 27 April 2010, India informed the ASEAN Secretariat that the Federation of Indian Chambers of Commerce and Industry (FICCI) would be organising the ASEAN Trade and Industrial Exhibition at the Pragati Maidan in New Delhi on 8–11 January 2011, at the sidelines of the AIBF.

The Fourteenth ASEAN Transport Ministers (ATM) Meeting on 6 November 2008 in Makati, Metro Manila, Philippines adopted the ASEAN-India Aviation Cooperation Framework, which will lay the foundation for closer aviation co-operation between ASEAN and India. The ASEAN-India Air Transport Agreement (AI-ATA) is being negotiated with the implementation timeline of 2011.

In tourism, the number of visitor arrivals from ASEAN to India in 2006 was 277,000, while the number of visitor arrivals from India to ASEAN in 2008 was 1.985 million. At the Sixth ASEAN-India Summit held on 21 November 2007 in Singapore, India proposed to set a target of 1 million tourist arrivals from ASEAN to India by 2010. The 2nd Meeting of ASEAN and India Tourism Ministers (ATM+India) held on 25 January 2010 in Bandar Seri Begawan positively responded to India's proposal to develop an ASEAN-India Tourism Cooperation Agreement and requested the ASEAN-India Tourism Working Group to further discuss and prepare the draft agreement. The Ministers also supported the establishment of the ASEAN Promotional Chapter for Tourism in Mumbai as an important collaborative platform for ASEAN National Tourism Organisations (NTOs) to market Southeast Asia to the Indian consumers and, at the same time, create mutual awareness between ASEAN Member States and India.

== Signatories ==
Flag	Country	Capital	Area (km^{2})	Population	GDP (nominal) (bln USD, IMF)	Currency	Official languages
(Brunei)	Brunei	Bandar Seri Begawan	5,765	423,196	9.07	dollar	Malay
(Myanmar)	Myanmar	Naypyidaw	676,578	53,582,855	72.36	kyat	Burmese
(Cambodia)	Cambodia	Phnom Penh	181,035	15,762,370	20.95	riel	Khmer
(Indonesia)	Indonesia	Jakarta	1,904,569	261,115,456	1074	rupiah	Indonesian
(Laos)	Laos	Vientiane	236,800	6,758,353	18.337	kip	Lao
(Malaysia)	Malaysia	Kuala Lumpur	329,847	31,976,000	340	ringgit	Malay
(Philippines)	Philippines	Manila	300,000	100,981,437 (2015)	310.31	peso	Filipino, English
(Singapore)	Singapore	Singapore	707.1	5,612,300 (2017)	294.56	dollar	Malay, Mandarin (Huayu), English, Tamil
(Thailand)	Thailand	Bangkok	513,115	68,863,514 (2016)	514.7	baht	Thai
(Timor-Leste)	Timor-Leste	Dili	14,874	1,296,311	1.28	dollar	Tetum, Portuguese
(Vietnam)	Vietnam	Hanoi	331,690	94,569,072	240.779	đồng	Vietnamese
(India)	India	New Delhi	3,287,263	1,324,171,354 (2011)	3,750	rupee	Hindi, English

== Tariffs ==
The signing of the ASEAN-India Trade in Goods Agreement paves the way for the creation of one of the world's largest FTAs – a market of almost 1.8 billion people with a combined GDP of US$2.8 trillion. The ASEAN-India FTA will see tariff liberalisation of over 90 percent of products traded between the two dynamic regions, including the so-called “special products,” such as palm oil (crude and refined), coffee, black tea and pepper. Tariffs on over 4,000 product lines will be eliminated by 2016, at the earliest.

== Criticism ==
While there are many benefits to the ASEAN-India FTA, there is concern in India that the agreement will have several negative impacts on the economy. As previously stated, the two regions aim to reduce their tariffs on a majority of their traded goods. This will allow them to increase the market access of their products. It is criticised, however, that India will not experience as great an increase in market access to ASEAN countries as ASEAN will in India. The economies of the ASEAN countries are largely export-driven, maintaining high export-to-GDP ratios (in 2007, Malaysia had a ratio of over 100%). Considering this, as well as the 2008 financial crisis and India's expansive domestic market, the ASEAN countries will look eagerly towards India as a home for its exports.

Since the early 2000s, India has had an increasing trade deficit with ASEAN, with imports exceeding exports by more than US$6 billion in 2007–2008. It is feared that a gradual liberalisation of tariffs and a rise in imported goods into India will threaten several sectors of the economy, specifically the plantation sector, some manufacturing industries, and the marine products industry. As a dominant exporter of light manufacturing products, ASEAN has competitive tariff rates that make it difficult for India to gain access to the industry market in ASEAN countries.

Before the agreement was signed, the Chief Minister of Kerala, V.S. Achuthanandan, led a delegation to the Indian Prime Minister protesting against the FTA. The state of Kerala is an important exporter in the national export of plantation products. It fears that cheap imports of rubber, coffee, and fish would lower domestic production, adversely affecting farmers and ultimately its economy. Kerala has already experienced a flooding of its market with inexpensive imports under the South Asia Free Trade Agreement of 2006. Cheap coconuts from Sri Lanka and palm oil from Malaysia has since hindered Kerala's coconut cultivation.

To alleviate the losses that arise from the initial stages of trade, the Government of India must be able to effectively redistribute some of the wealth to those industries who suffer from the increased competition with ASEAN markets. This way, total welfare gains in India would increase and India would ultimately benefit from trade with ASEAN.

Union Commerce Minister Piyush Goyal has sharply criticised India’s past trade strategy with ASEAN nations, calling the approach “silly” and describing the bloc as the “B-team of China”.

== See also ==
- India's International connectivity projects
- ASEAN–India Commemorative Summit
- ASEAN-India Car Rally 2012
- ASEAN Free Trade Area
- ASEAN–China Free Trade Area (ACFTA)
- INS Sudarshini
- Comprehensive Economic Partnership for East Asia
- List of free trade agreements
- Rules of Origin
- Market access
- Free-trade area
