= INS Tarangini =

Indian Navy sail training ship

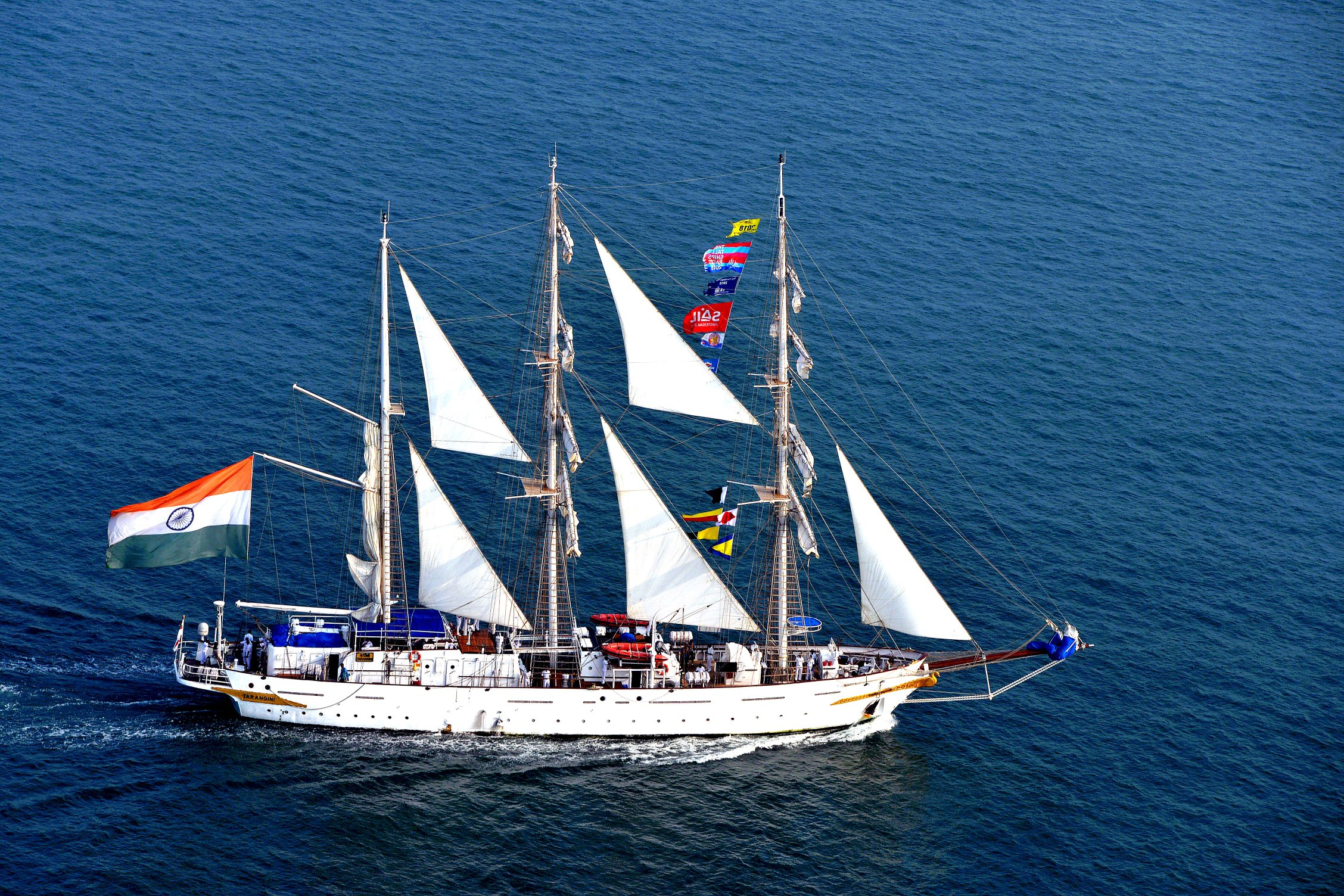
- INS Tarangini (A75) en-route to Sri Lanka

History

India
- Name: INS Tarangini
- Namesake: "Waves"
- Ordered: 1
- Builder: Goa Shipyard
- Laid down: 20 June 1995
- Launched: 1 December 1995
- Commissioned: 11 November 1997
- In service: 1
- Identification: IMO number: 1005253; MMSI number: 419100094; Callsign: VVXV; Pennant number: A75
- Status: Active
- Notes: War Cry "अदम्य साहस विशाल हंसिनी" Indomitable Courage of the Great Swan
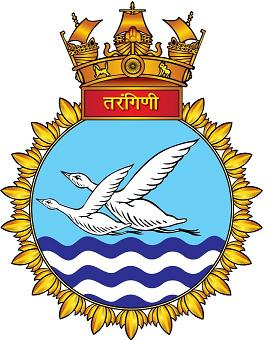
- Badge

General characteristics
- Class & type: Three masted barque
- Displacement: 513 tons
- Length: 54 m (177 ft)
- Beam: 8.53 m (28.0 ft)
- Height: 34.5 m (113 ft) (mainmast above waterline)
- Draught: 4.5 m (15 ft)
- Installed power: 320 hp (240 kW) per engine
- Propulsion: 2 Kirloskar Cummins diesels
- Sail plan: Barque rig (1035m² sail area)
- Complement: 61

INS Tarangini is a three-masted barque, commissioned in 1997 as a sail training ship for the Indian Navy. She is square rigged on the fore and main masts and fore-and-aft rigged on the mizzen mast. She was constructed in Goa to a design by the British naval architect Colin Mudie, and launched on 1 December 1995. In 2003–04, she became the first Indian naval ship to circumnavigate the globe.

Apart from races, the ship sails extensively across the Indian Ocean region for the purpose of providing sail training experience to the officer cadets of the Indian Navy. The Indian Navy believes that training on board these ships is the best method of instilling among the trainees the "indefinable 'sea-sense' and respect for elements of nature, which are inseparable from safe and successful seafaring". The Navy believes that sail training also serves to impart the values of courage, camaraderie, endurance and esprit-de-corps among budding naval officers.

== Service history ==
Tarangini started its first circumnavigation of the globe in 2003–04, with the theme of "building bridges of friendship across the oceans". During the fifteen-month voyage, the ship covered 33,000 nautical miles (61,000 km) and visited 36 ports in 18 countries. The ship was received by the president, Dr. A. P. J. Abdul Kalam.

In 2003–04, she became the first Indian naval ship to circumnavigate the globe. Since then, Tarangini has sailed to the Great Lakes in Canada for races and has also participated in European tall ship races. Tarangini won the Royal Thames Yacht Club Challenge Trophy in 2005 at Europe and stood third in Youth Sailing Division in 2007 in the USA.

The ship sailed to Europe in 2005 with the aim of ‘strengthening the bridges of friendship across the seas’. She called at 16 ports in 13 countries covering a distance of over 15,000 nautical miles. She participated in the International Fleet Review and International Festival of the Sea at Portsmouth, tall ship races organized by Sail Training International, Sail Bremerhaven and the Sail Amsterdam Sea Festival before returning to India.

On 10 January 2007, Tarangini started another 10-month overseas voyage named "Lokayan 07", calling at 23 ports in 16 countries. The ship departed Kochi on 10 January 2007 and transited through the Suez Canal to reach the Atlantic Coast of North America. It participated in a series of tall ship events such as the World Peace Cup, Maritime Festival of Charleston, Sail Virginia, Sail Rhode Island and Sail Boston and returned to port in October 2007 after covering 22,000 nautical miles (41,000 km).

The ship also undertook the Chola Expedition organized by the Maritime History Society of India to retrace the path followed by the Chola Empire seafarers from January to March 2008. The ship called at the ports of Jakarta, Singapore and Phuket during the expedition.

Tarangini flew the Indian flag at the International Fleet Review during the Diamond Jubilee celebrations of the Sri Lanka Navy in December 2010. She was the only tall ship to attend, and was the first ship to be reviewed by the Sri Lankan president. The ship stood out during the review with its yards manned by Indian naval cadets and midshipmen of the Sri Lanka Navy.

The value of sail training lies in its ability to foster the virtues of courage, camaraderie, esprit-de-corps and endurance—valued in the Indian Navy for character building. Sailing platforms are suitable for exposing young officers to the challenges at sea to imbibe "sea sense". Whilst under sail, cadets improve their appreciation of the elements to improve their practical experience.

During the last 15 years Tarangini has participated in 13 expeditions sailing over 188,000 nautical miles (348,000 km; 216,000 mi), remaining at sea for over 2,100 days, visiting 74 ports in 39 countries and transforming young naval cadets into mariners.

In 2012, INS Sudarshini, built to the same design, was commissioned by the Indian Navy.

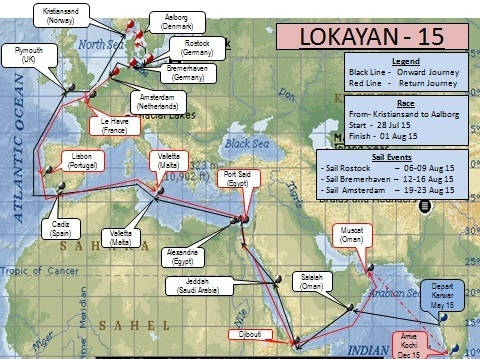
Route map of INS Tarangini for Lokayan - 15.

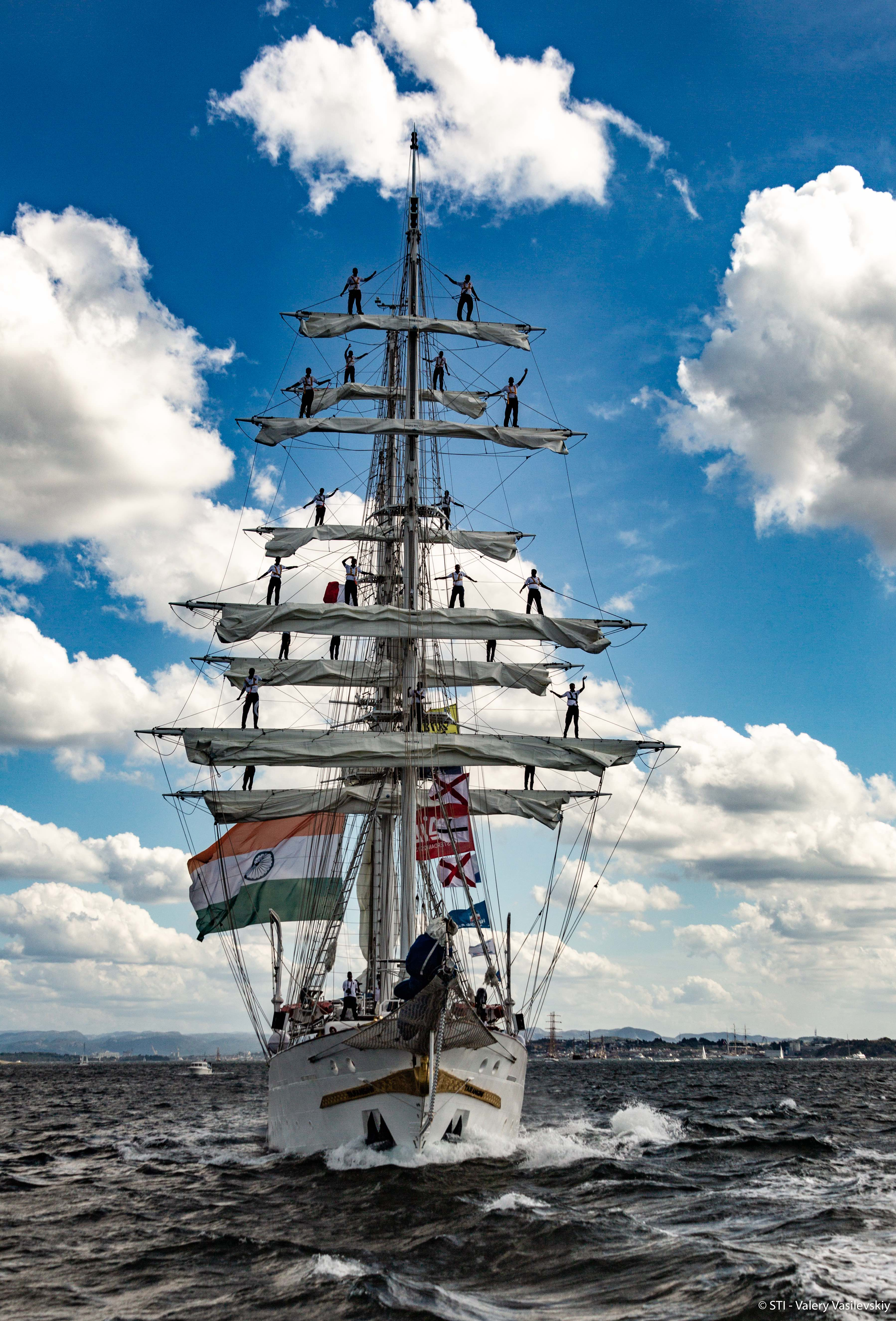
Lokayan 2018

In 2015, Tarangini began an eight-month voyage (4 May – 3 December 2015) to participate in the annual tall ship races and other events at Europe, organised under the aegis of Sail Training International. During these eight months, the ship traveled approximately 17,000 miles under sail through the Red Sea, the Mediterranean Sea and the North Sea. She visited 17 ports in 14 countries to showcase India to the world, and demonstrate the Indian Navy's global reach. The theme for the voyage, codenamed LOKAYAN-15, was chosen as "tacking for a broader reach". The tall ship races were conducted primarily off the coast of United Kingdom, Norway, Denmark, Germany and the Netherlands. Tarangini also participated in the tall ship race from Kristiansand, Norway to Aalborg, Denmark. She also participated in associated sail events such as Sail Rostock, Sail Bremerhaven in Germany and Sail Amsterdam in the Netherlands.

In 2018, Tarangini sailed for a seven months sailing expedition Lokayan 2018 from 10 April 18 to 30 October, wherein she participated in ‘Three Festival Tall Ships Regatta’ at Bordeaux (France) and thereafter participated in ‘Tall Ships Races Europe 2018’ from Sunderland (UK) to Esbjerg (Denmark) and Stavanger (Norway) to Harlingen (NL). The ship sailed with a theme ‘Sailing through Different Oceans…Uniting Nations’, covering a distance of about 22,000 Nm spanning over 15 ports across 13 Countries in 3 Continents showcased India to the World, demonstrating Indian Navy's global reach. The ship also sailed for ‘Tall Ships Sail Together’, a joint sailing expedition with her sister ship Sudarshini and Royal Omani Naval Sailing Ship ‘Zinat-al-Bihar’ from Kochi to Muscat as part of 10th anniversary of IONS in November 2018.

Tarangini has undertaken 16 Sailing Expeditions and traveled over 225,000 nautical miles (417,000 kilometres; 259,000 miles) in the last 22 years. Over the years, the ship has undertaken major expeditions such as Circumnavigation Voyage (2003–04), four LOKAYAN voyages (2005, 2007, 2015 and 2018), and IONS Sailing Expedition 2018.

On 22 November 2024, INS Tarangini conducted a joint sailing exercise with the Italian training ship Amerigo Vespucci off the coast of Kochi. She participated at the International Fleet Review 2026 held at Visakapatanam. Following her participation she was involved in search and rescue efforts for the crew of IRIS Dena, an Iranian Frigate sunk during the 2026 Iran war off the coast of Sri Lanka.She concluded her SAR efforts on March 6th before joining with the Sri Lankan Navy for joint training.

== List of Commanding Officers - INS Tarangini ==
Name	From	To
Cdr HD Motivala, SC	11 Nov 97	07 Jul 99
Cdr SM Kulkarni	10 Aug 99	25 Apr 01
Cdr S Shaukat Ali	26 Apr 01	31 Aug 03
Cdr PK Garg	01 Sep 03	11 Feb 04
Cdr Mukul Asthana	12 Feb 04	17 Jul 06
Cdr Sunil Balakrishnan	18 Jul 06	05 Nov 07
Cdr Abhimanyu Patankar	06 Nov 07	31 Jan 10
Cdr Manish Sain	01 Feb 10	07 Dec 11
Cdr Ashwin Arvind	08 Dec 11	10 Aug 12
Cdr T Sugreev	11 Aug 12	29 Dec 13
Cdr Gaurav Gautam	30 Dec 14	17 Oct 15
Cdr Deepak K Subramanian	18 Oct 15	28 Dec 16
Cdr Vidur Chenji	29 Dec 16	28 Dec 17
Cdr Rahul Mehta	29 Dec 17	21 Jan 19
Cdr Dalpat Singh Bhati	22 Jan 19	21 Jan 20
Cdr Rajesh Nag	22 Jan 20	23 Feb 21
Cdr Yatish Badoutiya	24 Feb 21	31 Jan 22
Cdr Praveen Kumar	01 Feb 22	27 Dec 22
Cdr Govind Singh Rathore	28 Dec 22	26 Dec 23
Cdr Augustine Thomas	27 Dec 23	02 Jan 25
Cdr Harpreet Singh	03 Jan 25	23 Nov 25

== Gallery ==
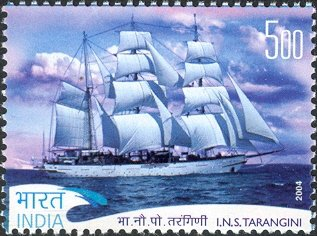
2004 stamp on Circumnavigation Voyage

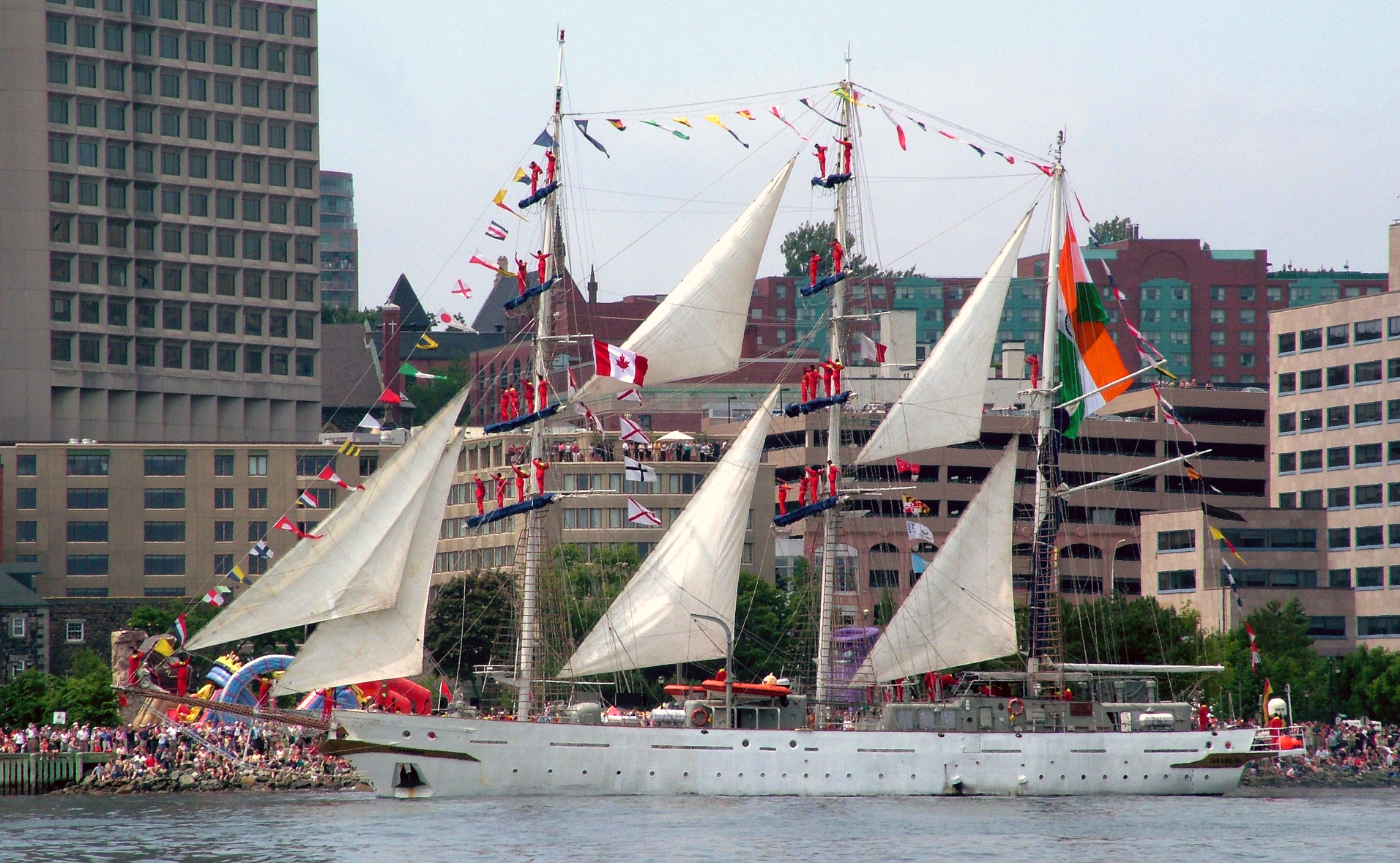
With the crew in the yardarms, Taragini slips along the Halifax, Nova Scotia, Canada waterfront in 2007.

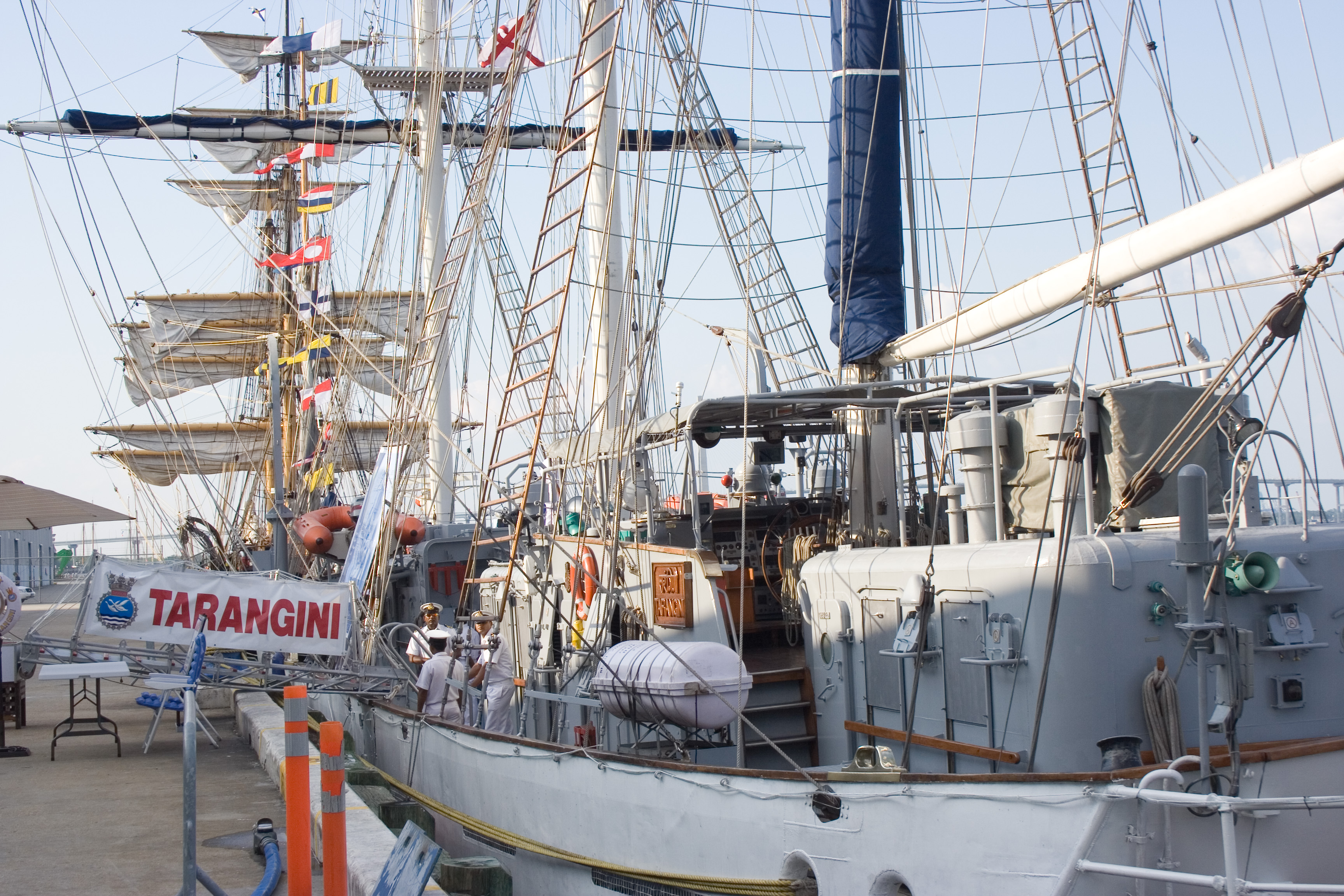
Tarangini in Charleston, South Carolina, US on May 16–20, 2007 to celebrate the Maritime Festival.

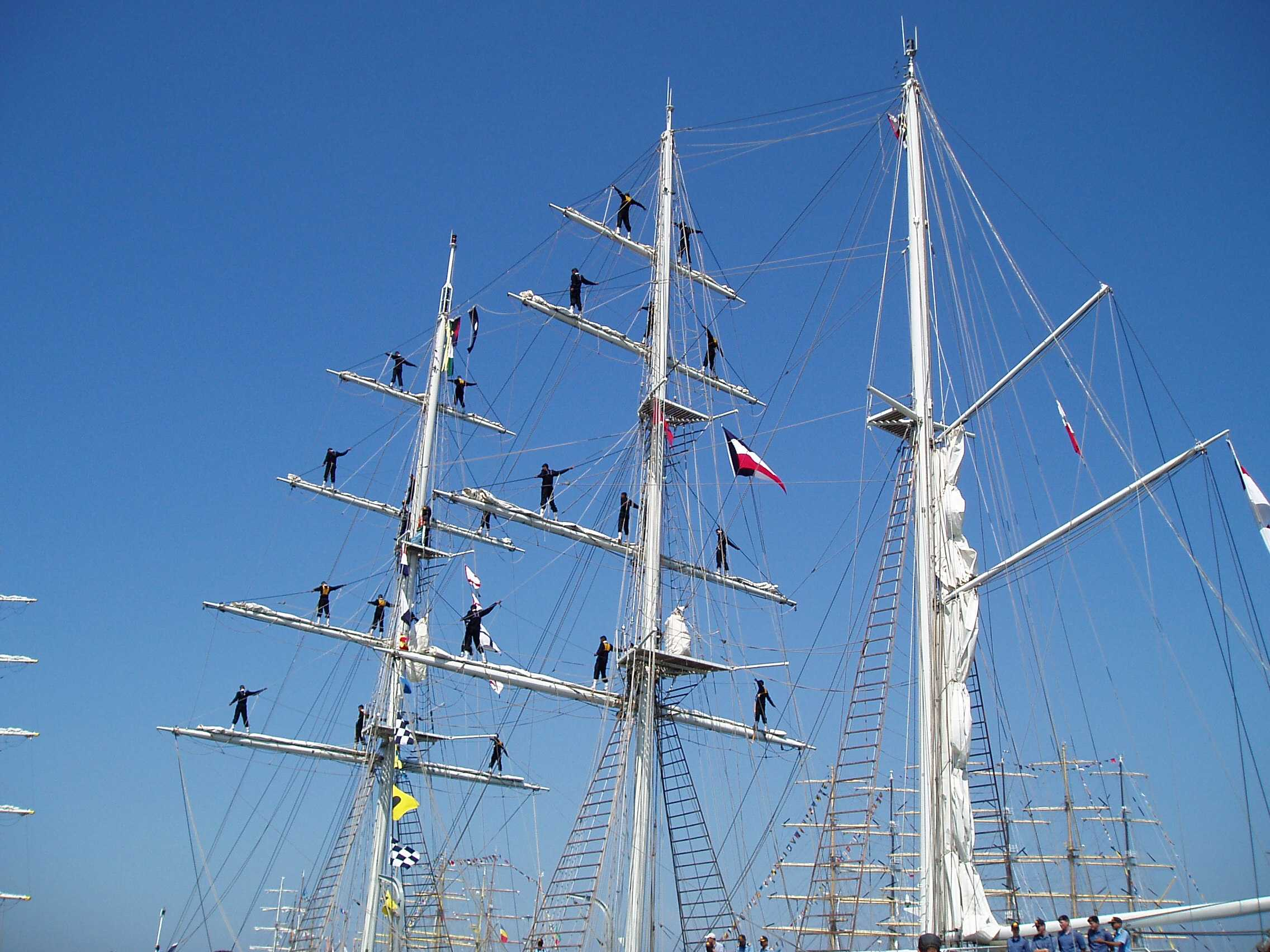
Tarangini on a voyage.

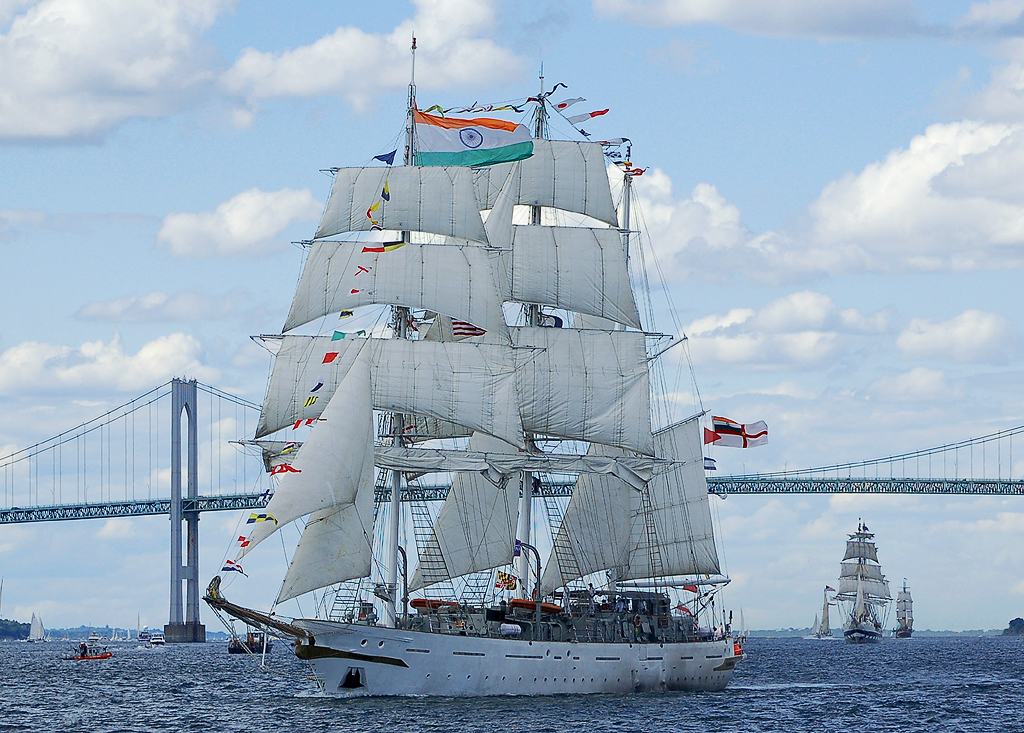
Tarangini passing under the Claiborne Pell Newport Bridge - Narragansett Bay, Rhode Island, US - followed by the Prince William and Picton Castle.

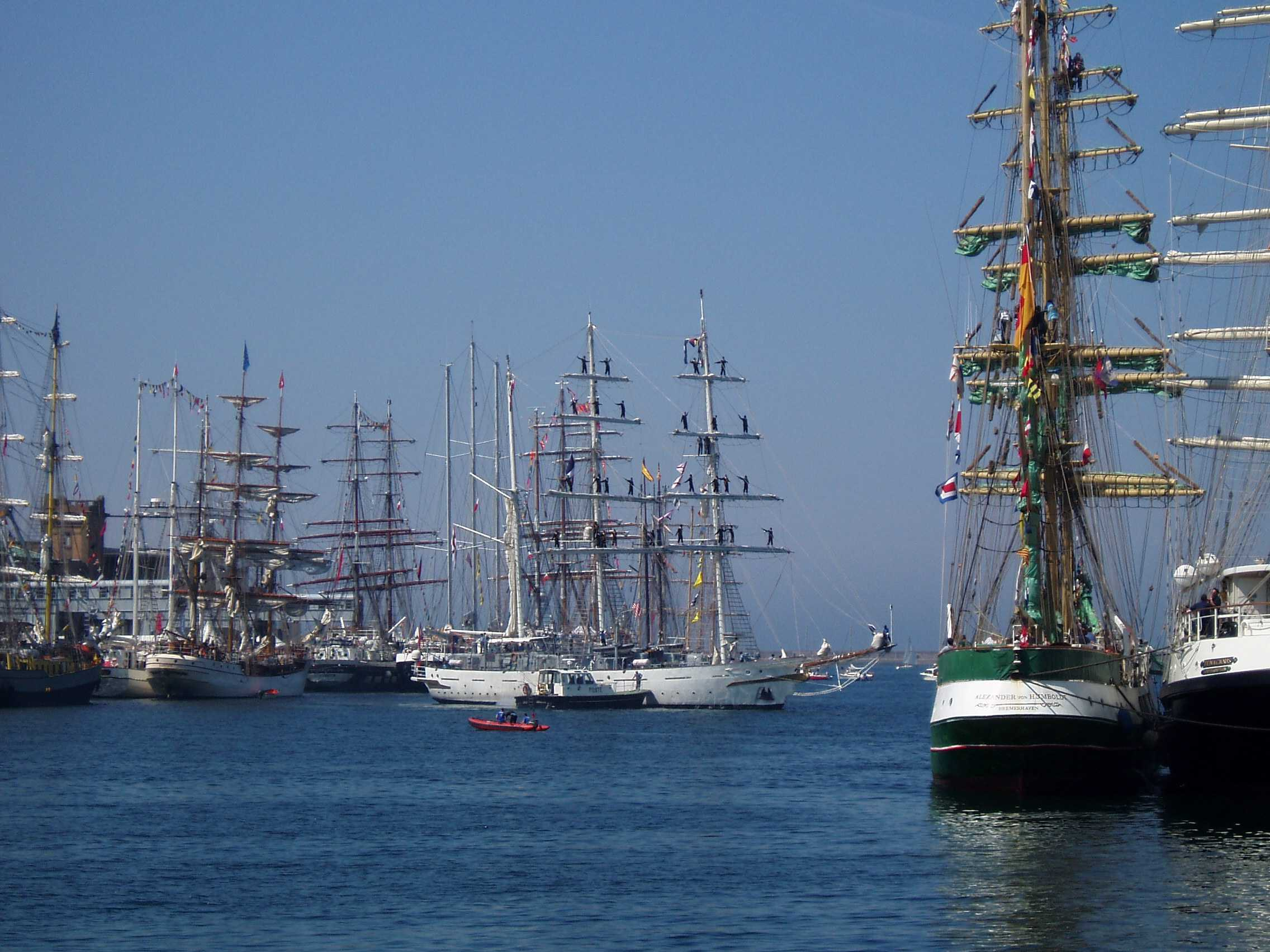
Cherbourg, France tall ship race, 2005

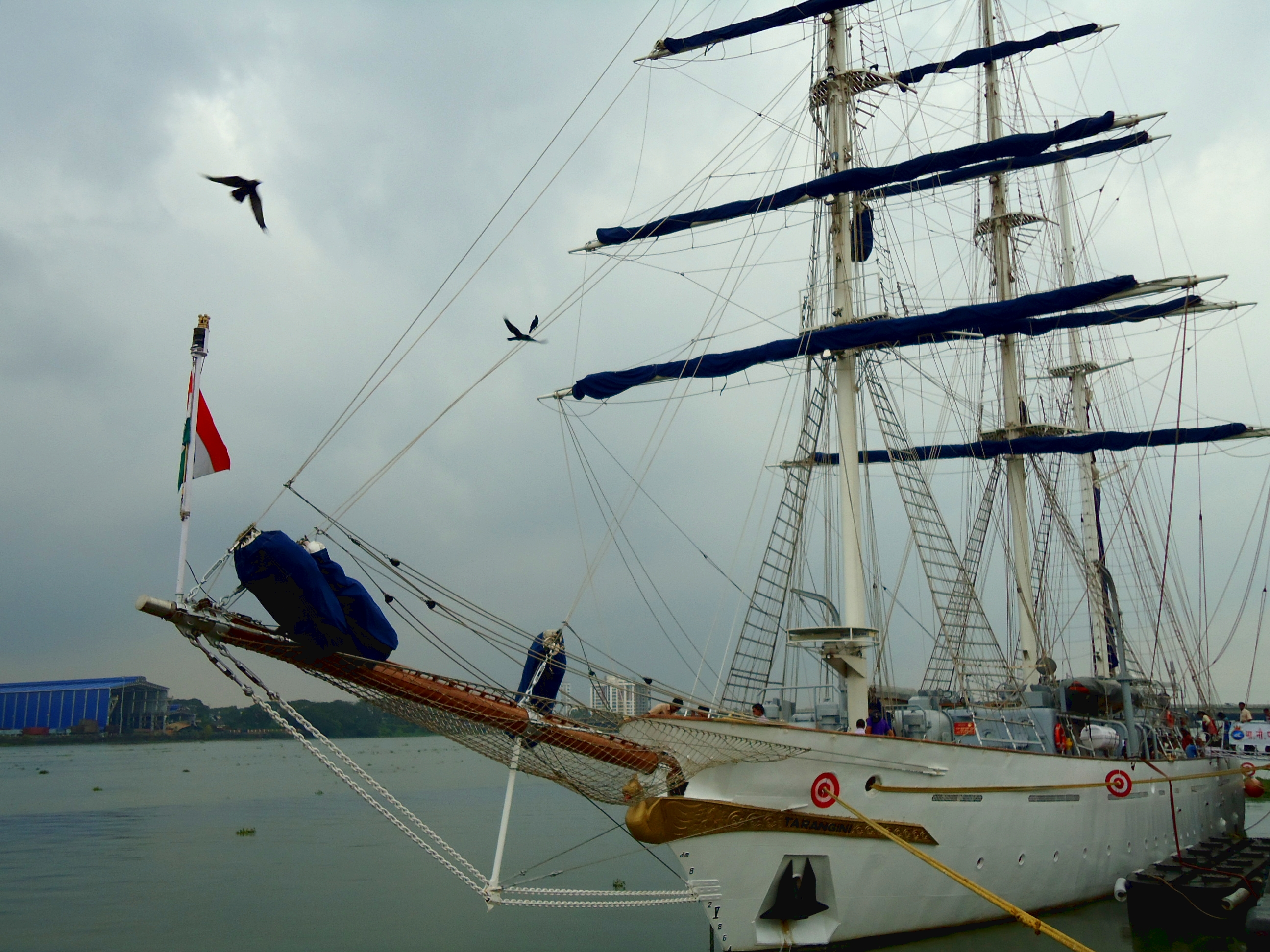
At southern Naval Command Cochin

== See also ==
- Training ships of the Indian Navy
- INS Sudarshini
- School ship
