= Italian training ship Palinuro =

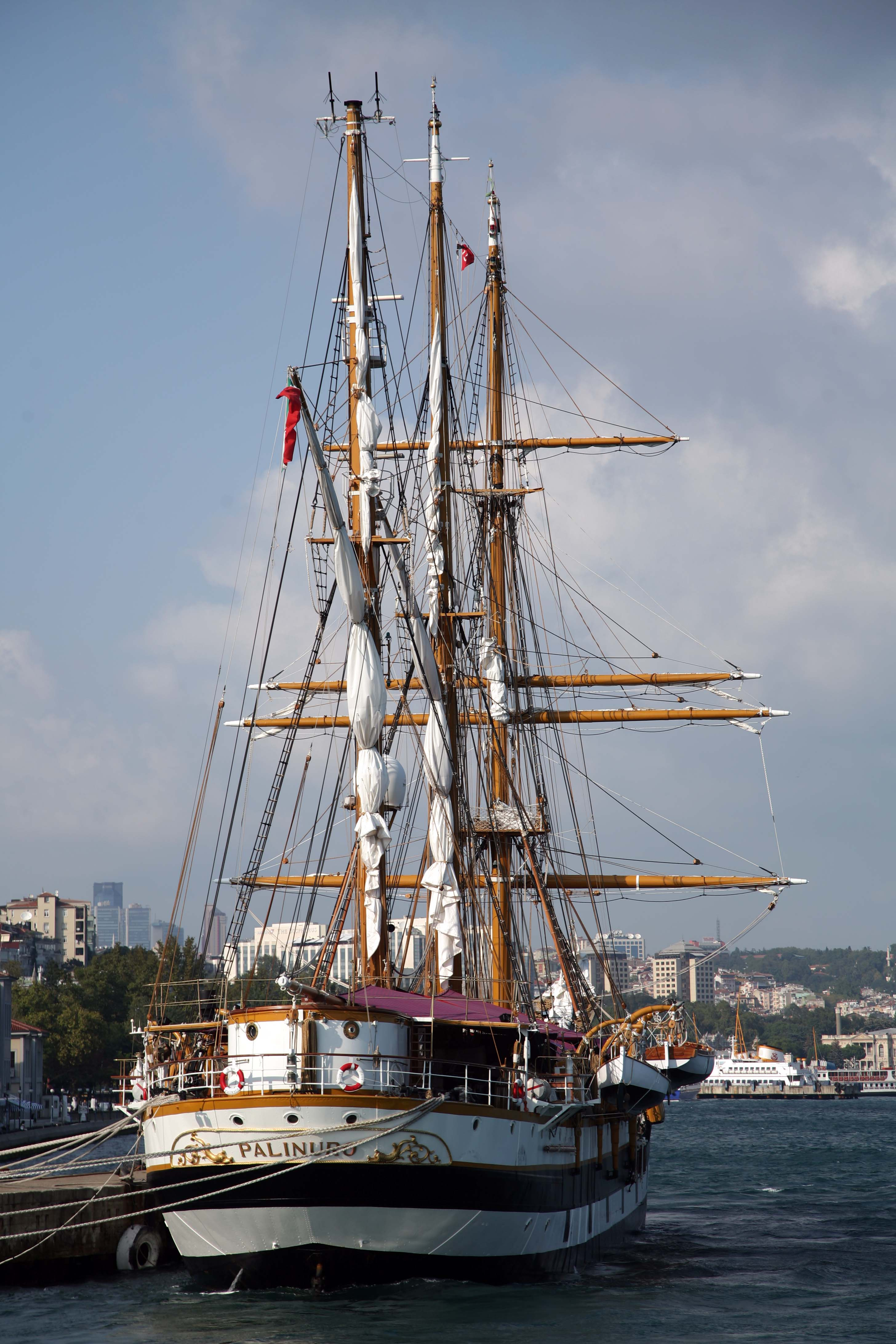

History

Italy
- Name: Palinuro
- Owner: Italian Navy
- Operator: Italian Navy
- Builder: Anciens Chantiers Dubigeon, Nantes (France)
- Laid down: 1933
- Launched: 21 March 1934
- Commissioned: 1934
- Recommissioned: 16 July 1955
- Renamed: Commandant Louis Richard (1934), Jean Marc Aline (1948), Palinuro (16 july 1951)
- Home port: La Maddalena
- Identification: MMSI number: 247939000; Callsign: IGMX; Italian Navy code: A5311
- Motto: Faventibus Ventis
- Status: Still in service

General characteristics
- Type: Iron-hulled barquentine
- Tonnage: 858 GT
- Displacement: 1,341 t (1,320 long tons) full load
- Length: - 69 m (226 ft 5 in) LOA; - 59 m (194 ft) LPP
- Beam: 10 m (32 ft 10 in)
- Height: 37.50 m (123 ft 0 in) at mainmast
- Draught: 4.80 m (15 ft 9 in)
- Sail plan: Barquentine rig, 15 sails, 1,000 m^{2} (11,000 sq ft)
- Speed: 9.5 knots (17.6 km/h; 10.9 mph)
- Endurance: - 1 x diesel engine Grandi Motori Trieste G.M.T. B230-6N, 447.5 kW (600.1 bhp); - 1 x shaft; - 5,400 nmi (10,000 km; 6,200 mi) at 7.5 knots (13.9 km/h; 8.6 mph)
- Crew: 84 (of which, 6 officiers) plus 54 cadets/trainees
- Notes: 2 GEM Elettronica navigation radar: one MM/SPN-754(V)1 and one MM/SPN-754(V)2 as January 2019

Palinuro is a three-masted, iron-hulled barquentine, active as sail training vessel for the Italian Navy.

Palinuro is named after Palinurus the famous helmsman of Aeneas's ship (after the fall of Troy the defeated Trojans detoured the Mediterranean). Palinurus is seen as a prototype of an experienced navigator or guide.

== History ==
Built at the shipyard Anciens Chantiers Dubigeon in Nantes by order of Joseph Briand (together with her sister ship Lieutenant René Guillon) and named Commandant Louis Richard, the ship was intended as barquentine. However the building costs of both ships ruined the original customer even before the ships were finished. The new owner Pècheries du Labrador from Saint-Malo finished the ships as schooner to be used for cod fishing.

In 1948 Commandant Louis Richard was bought by shipowner Bonin from Noirmoutier-en-Île, changed to a barquentine and renamed Jean Marc Aline to be used for fishing in the Southern Indian Ocean. Eventually this activity became unprofitable, thus the ship was set for sale.

In 1951 the Italian Navy was looking for a replacement for the Cristoforo Colombo (passed to the Soviet Union), bought the vessel and renamed her Palinuro. After a complete renovation the ship is used as training vessel for Senior Ratings.

In September 2026, ITS Palinuro conducted a Passage Exercise with INS Sudarshini (A77) of the Indian Navy during the latter's visit to Livorno as part of the Lokayan 2026 transoceanic voyage.

== Facts and figures ==
ITS Palinuro, during the training campaigns, has touched 164 different ports (many more than once), over the course of her history has traveled over 300,000 nautical miles, almost 15 times around the world.

ITS Palinuro has gone out 10 times from the Pillars of Hercules (Gibraltar), for five times she has passed the Strait of the Dardanelles (1991, 1993, 2007, 2016, 2018), while twice in her history has entered the Black Sea, crossing the Bosporus Strait (2016, 2018). Only once in its history has it crossed the Corinth Canal, on 22 August 2014.

The record for the longest time campaign is up to that of 1987, with a duration of 200 days, from 24 April to 10 November, for a total of 20 visited ports and 6925 miles traveled, but the largest number of miles traveled in only one campaign was achieved in 2002, with 12748 miles in 192 days of campaign.

The longest navigation, is 290 hours (a bit more than 12 days) with about 1350 miles traveled from Batumi (Georgia) to Argostoli (Kefalonia - Greece), dates back to 2018; while the longest in terms of distance is 2001 with 1473 miles traveled in 10 days from Valencia to La Rochelle.

The longest continuous sailing navigation was 150 hours and 12 minutes, during the 54th training campaign of 2018 on the Taranto - Kos route, which also represented the record of sailing hours on a single leg.

The campaign with the most sailing hours was the 2018 campaign with over 600 hours.
