= ASEAN–India Commemorative Summit =

ASEAN-India Commemorative Summit
- Logo
- Official languages: English
- Demonym: South Asian
- Membership: 11 members: Brunei; Cambodia; India; Indonesia; Laos; Malaysia; Myanmar; Philippines; Singapore; Thailand; Vietnam
- Establishment: 1992
- Currency: 8 currencies^{b}: (ISO 4217 in brackets); (BND) Brunei dollar; (KHR) Cambodian riel; (Rp) Indonesian rupiah; (INR) Indian rupee; (LAK) Lao Kip; (MYR) Malaysian ringgit; (MMK) Burmese kyat; (PHP) Philippine peso; (SGD) Singapore dollar; (THB) Thai baht; (VND) Vietnamese đồng
- Time zone: +05.30 to +09:00

Heads of State Governments at the ASEAN–India Commemorative Summit, 2012 in New Delhi
- Brunei Darussalam Sultan Hassanal Bolkiah Cambodia Prime Minister Hun Sen India Prime Minister Manmohan Singh Indonesia President Susilo Bambang Yudhoyono Laos Prime Minister Thongsing Thammavong Malaysia Prime Minister Najib Tun Razak Myanmar Prime Minister Thein Sein Philippines President Incumbent Jejomar Binay Singapore Prime Minister Lee Hsien Loong Thailand Prime Minister Yingluck Shinawatra Vietnam Prime Minister Nguyễn Tấn Dũng Also represented ASEAN Secretary General of ASEAN Surin Pitsuwan

The ASEAN – India Commemorative Summit was an international meeting which India hosted to mark the 20th anniversary of the ASEAN – India dialogue relations and 10-years of its summit level partnership. The summit was held from 20 to 21 December 2012 in New Delhi, India. The India-ASEAN relationship was elevated to a "strategic" partnership at the 2012 meeting.

To commemorate 20 years of relationship between ASEAN and India, India hosted the ASEAN–India Commemorative Summit on the theme "ASEAN-India Partnership for Peace and Shared Prosperity" in New Delhi on December 20–21, 2012. The commemorative summit included the Plenary Session on 20 December and Ceremonial Flag-down of the ASEAN-India Car Rally on 21 December. The commemorative summit was attended by the Heads of States of the 10 ASEAN countries and Indian Prime Minister Dr. Manmohan Singh.

A series of flagship events, meetings and workshops were organised through the year 2012. Part of these flagship events included the 2nd ASEAN-India Car Rally and the ASEAN expedition of the sail training ship INS Sudarshini of the Indian Navy.

== ASEAN India Car Rally 2012 ==
ASEAN-India Car Rally 2012
- ASEAN-INDIA Car Rally 2012 Official Logo
- Country: Indonesia, Singapore, Malaysia, Thailand, Cambodia, Vietnam, Laos, Myanmar, India
- Teams: 11
- Engine suppliers: Mahindra XUV500 and Mahindra Scorpio

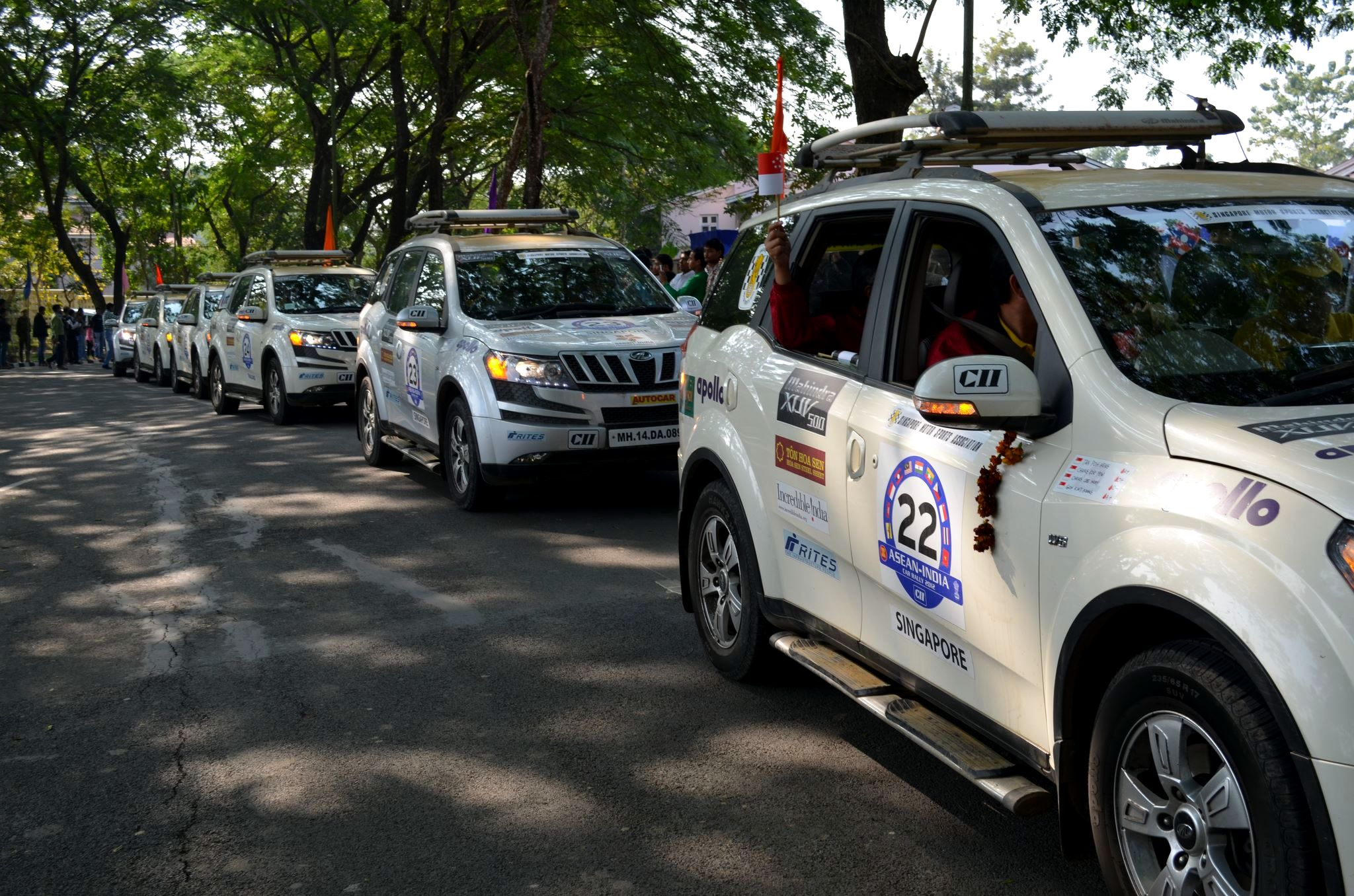
Asean India Car Rally 2012 at Numaligarh, Assam, India

The 2nd edition of the ASEAN-India Car Rally was flagged-off from Yogyakarta, Indonesia on November 26, 2012. There was also a ceremonial flag-off in Singapore. The rally passed through 8 ASEAN countries (except Brunei and the Philippines) covering a distance of around 8000 km over 22 days and was flagged down in Guwahati on December 17, 2012. 500 took part in this rally covering about 8000 km through 8 Asian countries.

The Car Rally was ceremonially flagged down by the Prime Minister of India and Leaders of ASEAN in New Delhi on December 21, 2012, during the ASEAN–India Commemorative Summit.

"Marker" events, including business seminars, tourism road-shows, cultural performances, etc. were organized along the route of the Car Rally by Indian Missions, CII, Ministry of Tourism and ICCR. The business events include: Seminars on 'Master Plan on ASEAN Connectivity and Public-Private Partnerships' in Singapore on November 27, 2012; 'India-ASEAN Connectivity: The opportunities in infrastructure' in Malaysia on November 29, 2012, 'ASEAN-India Connectivity: Promoting Business Linkages between ASEAN and India's North-East' in Bangkok on December 3, 2012; 'ASEAN - India : IT & ITES' at Ho Chi Minh City on November 6, 2012; a Round Table on Small and Medium Enterprise in Phnom Penh on December 7, 2012, and a Seminar on 'ASEAN – India Connectivity : A Successful Border Trade' in Mandalay on December 13, 2012.

Dignitaries from India who participated at the various events associated with the car rally include: Shri Sathyanarayana Sarvey, Hon'ble Minister of State for Road Transport & Highways (in Malaysia); Shri Tarun Gogoi, Chief Minister of Assam (in Ho chi Minh city); Shri O.Ibobi Singh, Chief Minister of Manipur (in Manipur); Shri Tarun Gogoi, Chief Minister of Assam and Smt.D.Purandeswari, Minister of State (Commerce & Industry) at the flag down of the car rally in Guwahati.

== INS Sudarshini's ASEAN Expedition ==
The INS Sudarshini Expedition was flagged off from Kochi on 15 September 2012, was given a Naval send-off at Chennai on September 29, 2012. The expedition concluded on 29 March 2013 at Kochi where it was received by Minister of Defence (India) A. K. Antony. During the 6-month expedition, INS Sudarshini called on Padang, Bali, Manado, Brunei, Cebu, Manila, Da Nang, Sihanoukville, Bangkok, Singapore, Klang, Phuket and Sittwe.

During this expedition, several business events were organised including: Seminar on 'ASEAN-India FTA' in Indonesia followed by B2B Meeting on October 24, 2012; 'India-Indonesia Business Seminar for Progress & Prosperity' organized at the Bali Chamber of Commerce & Industry followed by B2B Meeting on October 29, 2012; 'Academic Seminar on India & Indonesia–Shared History & Culture and Opportunities for deepening People–to–People Contacts' organized at Udayana University on October 30, 2012 and B2B Meeting between Manado Chamber of Commerce (Kadin Manado) and delegation of Indian businessmen led by FICCI, preceded by a half-day IT-ITeS Seminar at Sam Ratulangi University on November 12, 2012; a Seminar on 'India-ASEAN FTA' organized in association with ICC, Kolkata. Philippine Chamber of Commerce and India-Philippine Business Council on December 14, 2012, in Manila. Other events included, Seminar on 'India-ASEAN FTA' in Vietnam followed by B2B Meeting on January 2, 2013; Seminar on 'India - ASEAN FTA' followed by B2B meeting in Bangkok on January 18, 2013, Seminar on 'India – Singapore Partnership: Ports, Logistics & related Maritime Domain' in association with FICCI in Singapore in February 2013; Seminar on 'Trade and Investment Forum – India-Malaysia Comprehensive Economic Cooperation Agreement: the Next Steps' in Malaysia on February 16, 2013, followed by a B2B Meeting; Seminar on 'India-ASEAN FTA' at Sittwe organized in association with ICC, Kolkata followed by a B2B Meeting in March 2013.

== See also ==
- ASEAN–India relations
- ASEAN-India Car Rally 2012
- INS Sudarshini
- ASEAN–India Free Trade Area
- ASEAN
- Comprehensive Economic Partnership for East Asia
