= INS Sudarshini =

Sail Training ship of thee Indian Navy

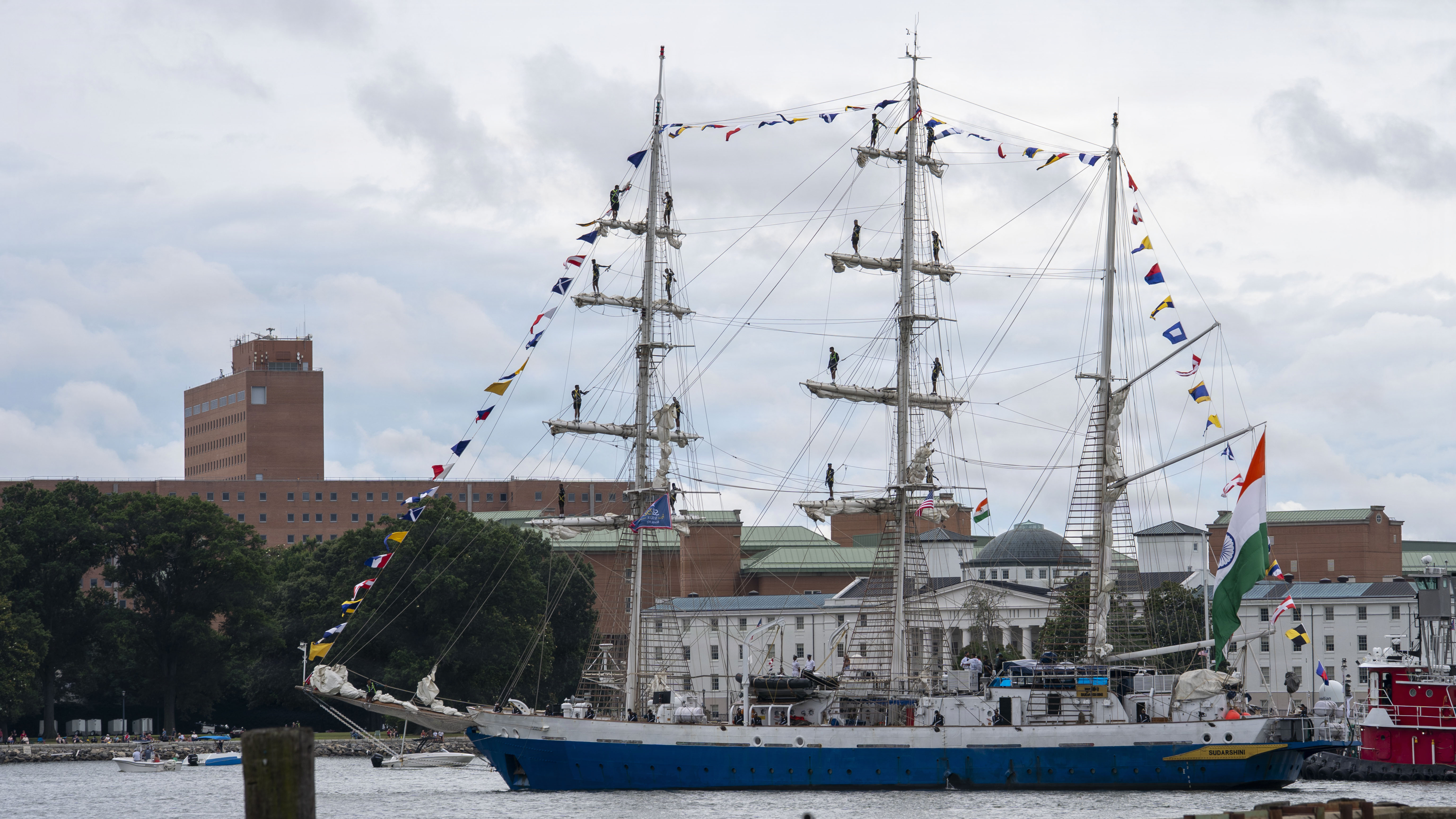
- INS Sudarshini arriving in Norfolk during the Sail250 Virginia

History

India
- Name: INS Sudarshini
- Namesake: Sundari Nanda
- Owner: Indian Navy
- Builder: Goa Shipyard Limited
- Launched: 25 January 2011
- Commissioned: 27 January 2012
- Home port: Kochi, Southern Naval Command
- Identification: IMO number: 1011721; MMSI number: 419000297; Pennant number: A77
- Status: Active

General characteristics
- Class & type: Three-masted barque
- Displacement: 513 tons
- Length: 54 m (177 ft)
- Beam: 8.53 m (28.0 ft)
- Height: 34.5 m (113 ft) (mainmast above waterline)
- Draught: 4.5 m (15 ft)
- Installed power: 320 hp (240 kW) per engine
- Propulsion: 2 Kirloskar Cummins diesel engines
- Sail plan: Barque rig (1035 m^{2} sail area)
- Complement: 61

INS Sudarshini is a sail training ship built by Goa Shipyard for the Indian Navy. The ship is a sister ship of INS Tarangini which was commissioned in 1997. "Sudarshini" means "beautiful lady" Sundari after the younger half-sister of Buddha. The ship was designed by Colin Mudie, a naval architect and yacht designer from the United Kingdom.

== Design and construction ==
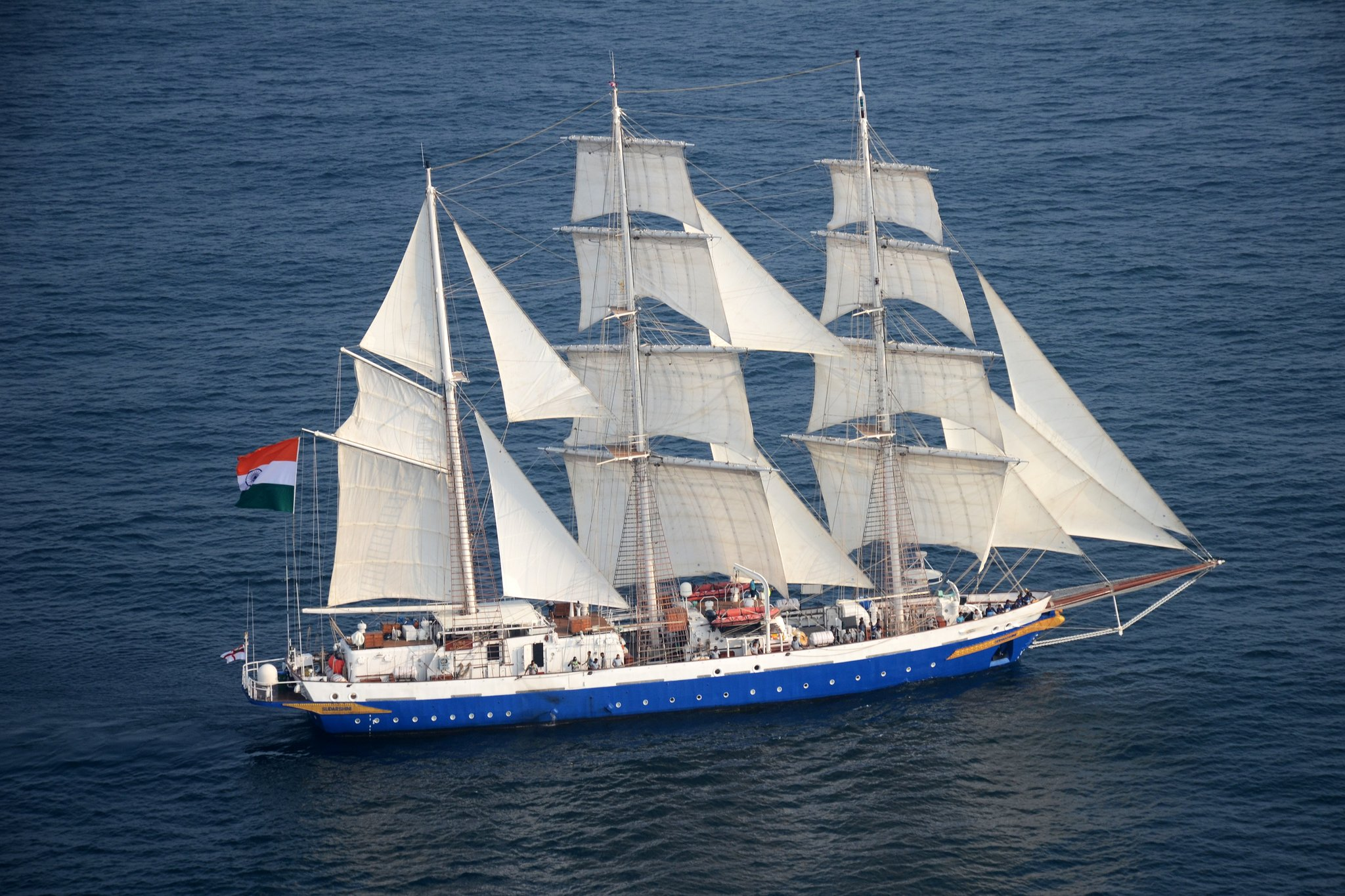
INS Sudarshini (A77) en-route to Sri Lanka

Sudarshini is a three-masted sailing ship with a barque rig. It is 54 metres long and has 20 sails, 7.5 km of rope and 1.5 km of steel wire rope. Its sails have a total area of approximately 1,035 square metres (11,140 sq ft). Capable of operations under sail or power, and with complement of five officers, 31 sailors and 30 cadets embarked for training, it can remain at sea for at least 20 days at a time.

Sudarshini's steel hull was launched on 25 January 2011 at the port town of Vasco da Gama, Goa on the west coast of India, and by then the major portion of work had been completed. It was commissioned in Indian Navy on 27 January 2012 by Vice Admiral K.N. Sushil, Flag Officer Commanding-in-Chief, Southern Naval Command. Built for worldwide operations, it will be used as a basic seamanship and character building platform.

== Service history ==
Sudarshini started its first nine nation voyage of the ASEAN countries on 15 September 2012 to trace the ancient route taken by Indian mariners to South East Asia. During the course of the 12,000 mile voyage, she visited 13 ports in 9 ASEAN countries. The ship visited the ports of Padang, Bali, Manado in Indonesia, Port Muara in Brunei, Cebu, Manila, Da Nang, Sihanoukville in Cambodia, Bangkok, Phuket in Thailand, Singapore, Port Klang in Malaysia and Sittwe in Myanmar. While on the voyage, the ship's embarked Indian Naval and Coast Guard cadets, as well as cadets from other ASEAN countries. During the ASEAN deployment, the commanding officer of Sudarshini, Commander N Shyam Sundar, wrote live blogs from sea. This was the first time the Indian Navy had used social media to promote a diplomatic naval voyage. The ship returned to its home port, Kochi, on 25 March 2013 and was greeted by the then Defence Minister of India, A. K. Antony, the then Chief of Southern Naval Command, Vice Admiral Satish Soni, ambassadors and heads of missions of ASEAN nations.

Sudarshini, the second sail training ship of the Indian Navy, has already covered 140,000 nmi (260,000 km; 160,000 mi) until 2025.

=== Lokayan 26 ===
On 20 January 2026, INS Sudarshini set sail from Kochi, Southern Naval Command for Lokayan 26, a 10-month long transoceanic sail expedition. The deployment will span across 18 ports and 13 countries and a voyage distance of 22,000 nmi (41,000 km; 25,000 mi). The ship will also participate in two tallship events including the Escale à Sète 2026 in France and the Sail 250 in New York Harbor. The Sail 250 event is a special edition to commemorate the United States' 250th Independence anniversary to be held between 4 July and 8 July. The voyage includes the sail training of over 200 Indian Navy and Coast Guard cadets.

She made port calls at Port of Salalah (Oman) and Safaga (Egypt) on 2 February and 21 February 2026, respectively. The ship travelled a distance of 1,832 nmi (3,393 km) through the Gulf of Aden and the Red Sea in 16 days. After sailing through the Suez canal, she arrived at Valletta (Malta) on 12 March 2026. She is to sail to France later for participation in the Escale à Sète maritime festival. She reached Sète (France) on 26 March and departed on 7 April following participation in the Escale à Sète, an Indian Navy marching contingent participating in the Heritage City Parade, commemorating 400th anniversary of the French Navy and the ship's rowing team clinching a bronze medal at the Jeux Maritimes. The ship arrived at the Port of Casablanca, Morocco on 15 April for a three day visit. She reached Las Palmas of the Canary Islands, Spain on 23 April for a three-day visit. This is the maiden visit of an Indian naval ship to the archipelago. The final African destination before the trans-Atlantic voyage would be Mindelo, Cape Verde. The ship reached Mindelo as part of its eighth port call on 4 May and departed on 8 May. The ship reached Antigua as the first destination after the 19-day trans-Atlantic voyage on 27 May. This was the longest leg of the mission and marked the maiden trans-Atlantic voyage of the ship while the last such crossing by an Indian Navy ship was conducted by INS Tarangini. The port call concluded at Antigua on 31 May.

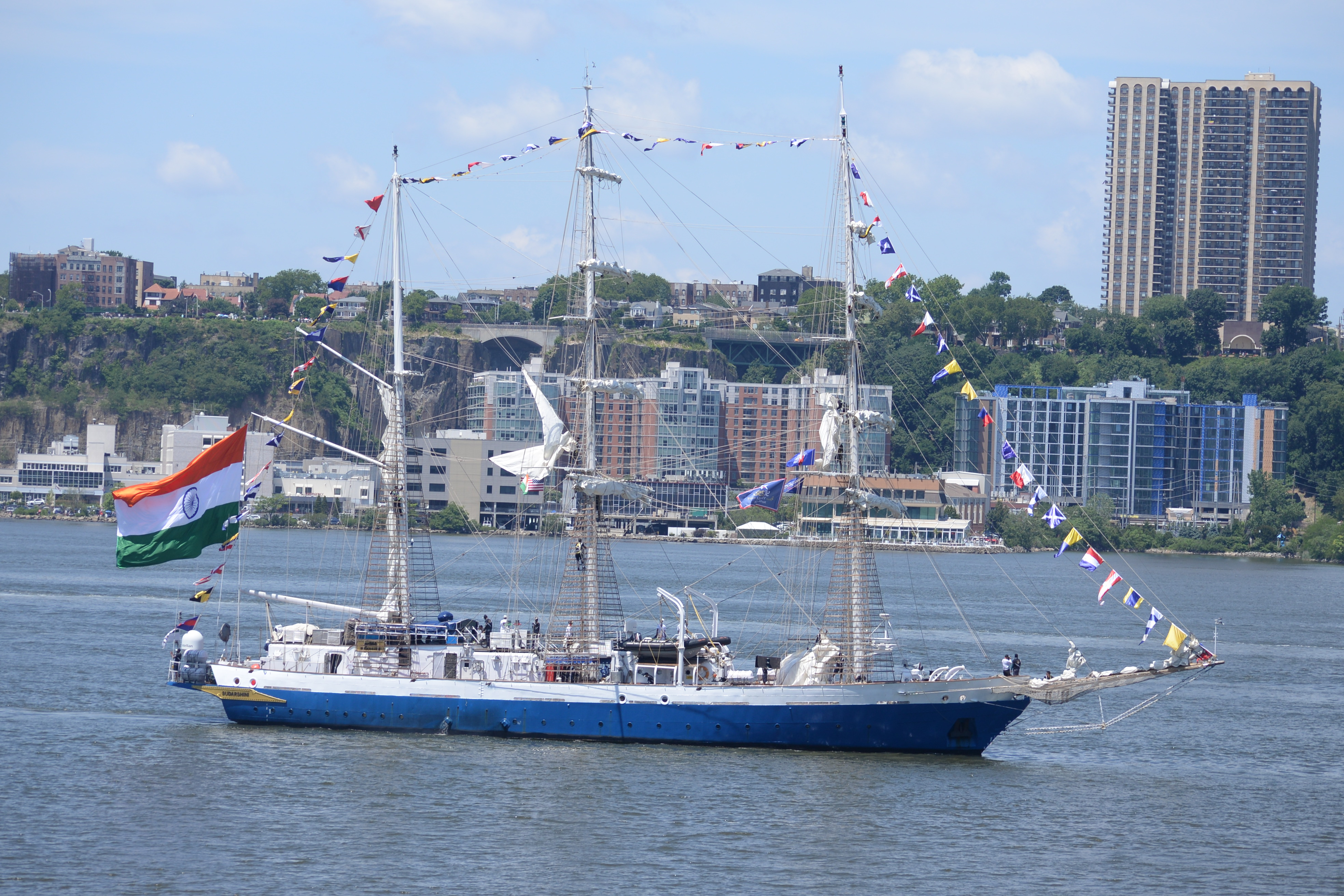
INS Sudarshini sails up the Hudson River during Sail250.

In 2026, Sudarshini participated in Sail250, a parade of tall and military ships celebrating the United States' 250th anniversary, beginning in Norfolk, Virginia, including the Parade of Sail and the City Crew Parade. Later, she arrived at the Port of Baltimore, Maryland to participate in Sail250 Maryland. She called at Port of New York and New Jersey from 4 to 8 July. There she participated in the United States International Naval Review 250 and Parade of Sail along the Hudson River. The ship hosted over 1,000 visitors while at port call as she was open. On 12 July 2026, INS Sudarshini arrived at Boston and participated in the Grand Parade of Sails which marked the beginning of Sail Boston 2026. She passed through landmarks including Castle Island and the Seaport District before her berthing. The ship departed Boston on 25 July. She was docked at the Boston Fishing Pier during the Boston leg of the visit. Throughout the port calls in the United States for Sail250 events in Norfolk, Baltimore, New York and Boston, Sudarshini served as the floating ambassador of India.

Sudarshini reached Ponta Delgada, Azores, Portugal on 13 August following the transoceanic passage across the Atlantic Ocean which spanned 19 days. She departed Ponta Delgada on 16 August with the next destination being Lisbon where a joint passage exercise with NRP Sagres is planned on 21 August. The ship called at Port of Lisbon, Portugal from 22 to 25 August. This marked the 15th port call of the ship in seven months. Indian cadets visited the Portuguese Naval Academy. Later, she visited the Port of Barcelona, Spain from 1 to 6 September where gates were opened to visitors on 4 September. Sudarshini undertook a Passage Exercise with ITS Palinuro (A5311) of the Italian Navy before reaching Port of Livorno, Italy on 9 September. By then, the ship had sailed 17,400 nmi (32,200 km; 20,000 mi) during the voyage while visiting 10 countries. During the visit, Admiral Giuseppe Berutti Bergotto, the Chief of Staff of the Italian Navy, boarded the ship and interacted with the ship crew and trainees. The trainees also visited ITS Virginio Fasan (F 591) and the Italian Naval Academy. She departed the country on 12 September.

Sudarshini returned to Egypt while making a port call to the Alexandria Port on 23 September. She conducted a port call at Port of Salalah in Oman from 14 to 17 October.

== See also ==
- Training ships of the Indian Navy
- INS Tarangini
- School ship
- ASEAN–India Commemorative Summit
- ASEAN-India Car Rally 2012
