= Shivalik-class frigate =

Class of Indian stealth frigates

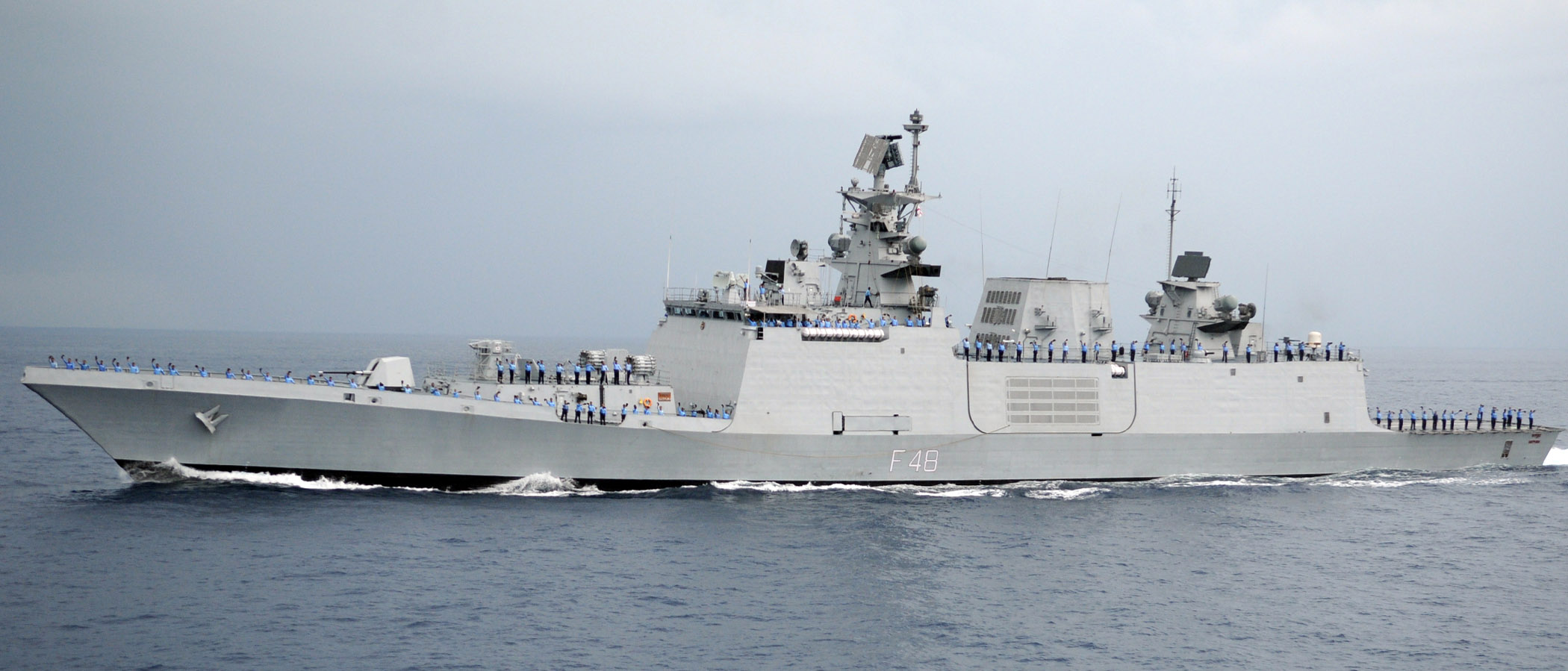
- INS Satpura (F48) transits the Indian Ocean during Malabar 2012.

Class overview
- Name: Shivalik class
- Builders: Mazagon Dock Limited
- Operators: Indian Navy
- Preceded by: Talwar class
- Succeeded by: Nilgiri class
- Cost: 650 Million USD
- Planned: 3
- Completed: 3
- Active: 3

General characteristics
- Type: Guided-missile frigate
- Displacement: 6,200 tonnes (6,100 long tons; 6,800 short tons) full load
- Length: 144 m (472 ft)
- Beam: 16.9 m (55 ft)
- Draught: 4.5 m (15 ft)
- Installed power: 2 × Pielstick 16 PA6 STC Diesel engines (11,300 kW each); 2 × GE LM2500+ (25,100 kW each)
- Propulsion: CODOG
- Speed: 32 knots (59 km/h; 37 mph); 22 knots (41 km/h; 25 mph) (diesel engines)
- Range: In excess of 5,000 nautical miles (9,000 km) at 18 kn (33 km/h)
- Complement: 257 (35 officers + 222 sailors)
- Sensors & processing systems: Radar :-; 1 x Fregat M2EM 3-D radar (Surface & Air); 4 × MR-90 Orekh radar; 1 × Elta EL/M-2238 STAR; 2 × Elta EL/M 2221 STGR; 1 × BEL APARNA; Sonar :-; BEL HUMSA-NG active/passive sonar; Thales Sintra active towed-array sonar; Combat Suite :-; "Combat Management System" (CMS-17A)
- Electronic warfare & decoys: BEL Ellora electronic warfare suite; Decoy:-; 4 x Kavach decoy launchers
- Armament: Anti-air missiles: 1 × Shtil-1 single-arm surface-to-air missile launcher (24 missiles); 32-cell VLS for Barak 1 point-defence surface-to-air missiles; Anti-ship/Land-attack missiles: 8 × VLS launched BrahMos, anti-ship and land-attack cruise missiles; Guns: 1 × OTO Melara 76 mm naval gun; 2 × AK-630 CIWS; 2 x OFT 12.7 mm M2 Stabilized Remote Controlled Gun; Anti-submarine warfare: 2 × 2 DTA-53-956 torpedo launchers; 2 × RBU-6000 (RPK-8) rocket launchers
- Aircraft carried: 2 × HAL Dhruv or Sea King Mk. 42B helicopters.

The Shivalik class or Project 17 class is a class of multi-role frigates in service with the Indian Navy. They are the first warships designed with low observability features built in India. They were designed to have better stealth features and land-attack capabilities than the preceding Talwar-class frigates. A total of three ships were built between 2000 and 2010, and all three were in commission by 2012.

The Shivalik class, along with the seven Project 17A frigates currently being developed from them, are projected be the principal frigates of the Indian Navy in the first half of the 21st century. The class and the lead vessel have been named for the Shivalik hills. Subsequent vessels in the class are also named for hill ranges in India.

== Design and description ==
Project 17 was conceived in the 1990s to meet the Indian Navy's need for a class of stealthy frigates that were to be designed and built in India. The Directorate of Naval Design (DND)'s specifications for the project called for a class of "5000 ton stealth frigates (Project 17) incorporating advanced signature suppression and signature management features". The first three units were formally ordered by the Indian Navy in early 1999.

Shivalik's design embodies many firsts in Indian ships. Shivalik is the first Indian naval vessel to use a combined diesel or gas (CODOG) propulsion system. The CODOG gearboxes were designed and built by Elecon Engineering.

The main features of the class are its stealth characteristics and land-attack capability. The ships incorporate structural, thermal and acoustic stealth features.

There has also been an increased emphasis on crew comfort in this class of ships with more spacious accommodation being provided. Also, INS Shivalik is the first ship in the Indian Navy with chapati and dosa makers on board.

On 11 January 2023, the Defence Acquisition Council (DAC) approved the Acceptance of Necessity (AoN) for procurement of BrahMos launchers and fire control systems for Shivalik-class frigates and Next Generation Missile Vessels.

=== General characteristics and propulsion ===
The Shivalik-class frigates have a length of 142.5 m (468 ft) overall, a beam of 16.9 m (55 ft) and a draft of 4.5 m (15 ft). The ships displace about 4,900 tonnes (4,800 long tons; 5,400 short tons) at normal load and 6,200 tonnes (6,100 long tons; 6,800 short tons) at full load. The complement is about 257, including 35 officers.

They use two Pielstick 16 PA6 STC Diesel engines and two GE LM2500+ boost turbines in CODOG configuration providing a total of 47,370 shp (35,320 kW) of power. This allows the ships to reach a maximum speed of 32 knots (59 km/h; 37 mph).

=== Electronics and sensors ===
The Shivalik-class frigates are equipped with a wide range of electronics and sensors. These include:

- 1 × MR-760 Fregat M2EM 3-D radar
- 4 × MR-90 Orekh radars
- 1 × ELTA EL/M-2238 STAR
- 2 × ELTA EL/M-2221 STGR
- 1 × BEL APARNA

In addition, the ships use HUMSA-NG (hull-mounted sonar array) and the BEL Ellora Electronic Warfare suite.

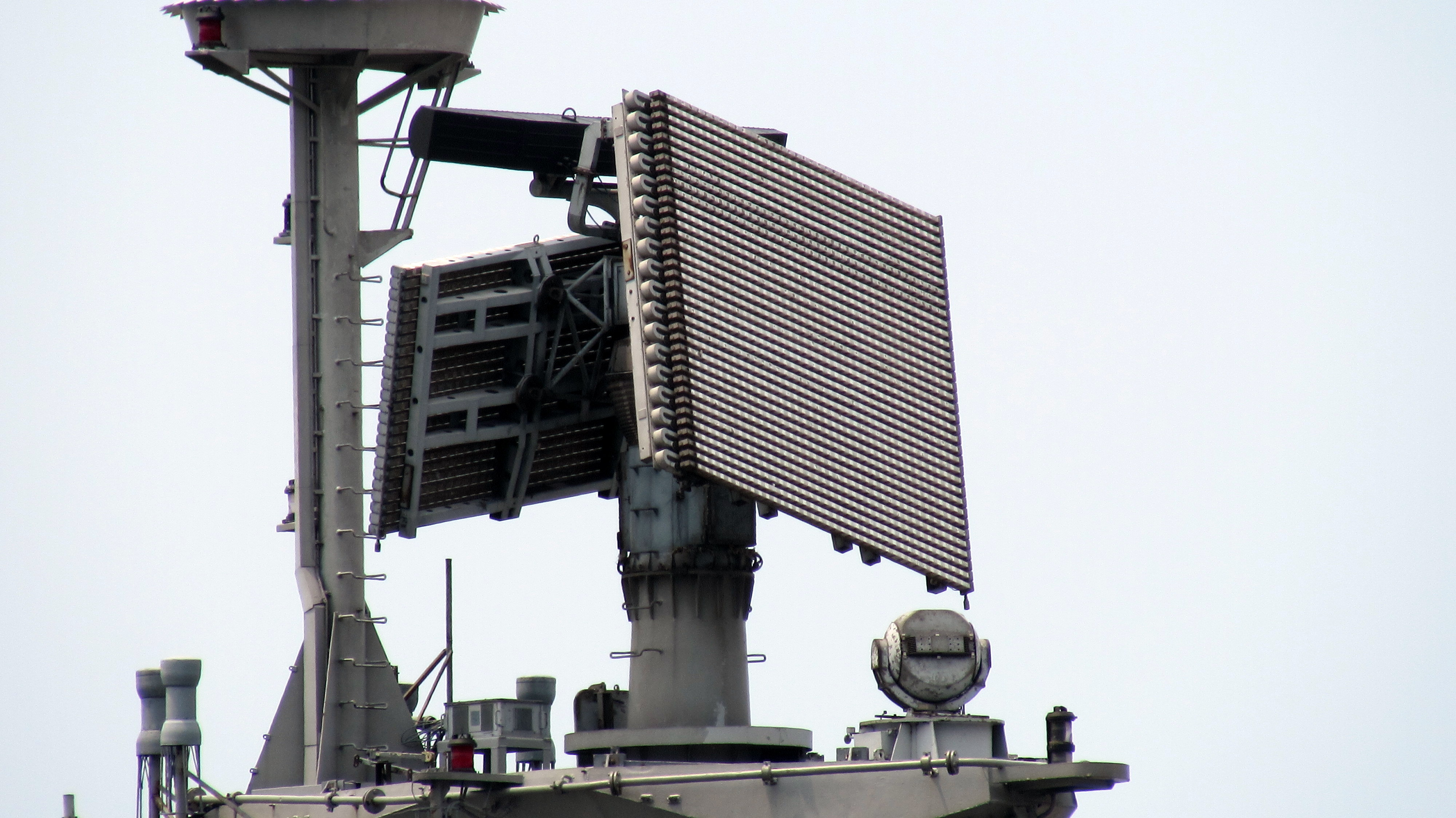
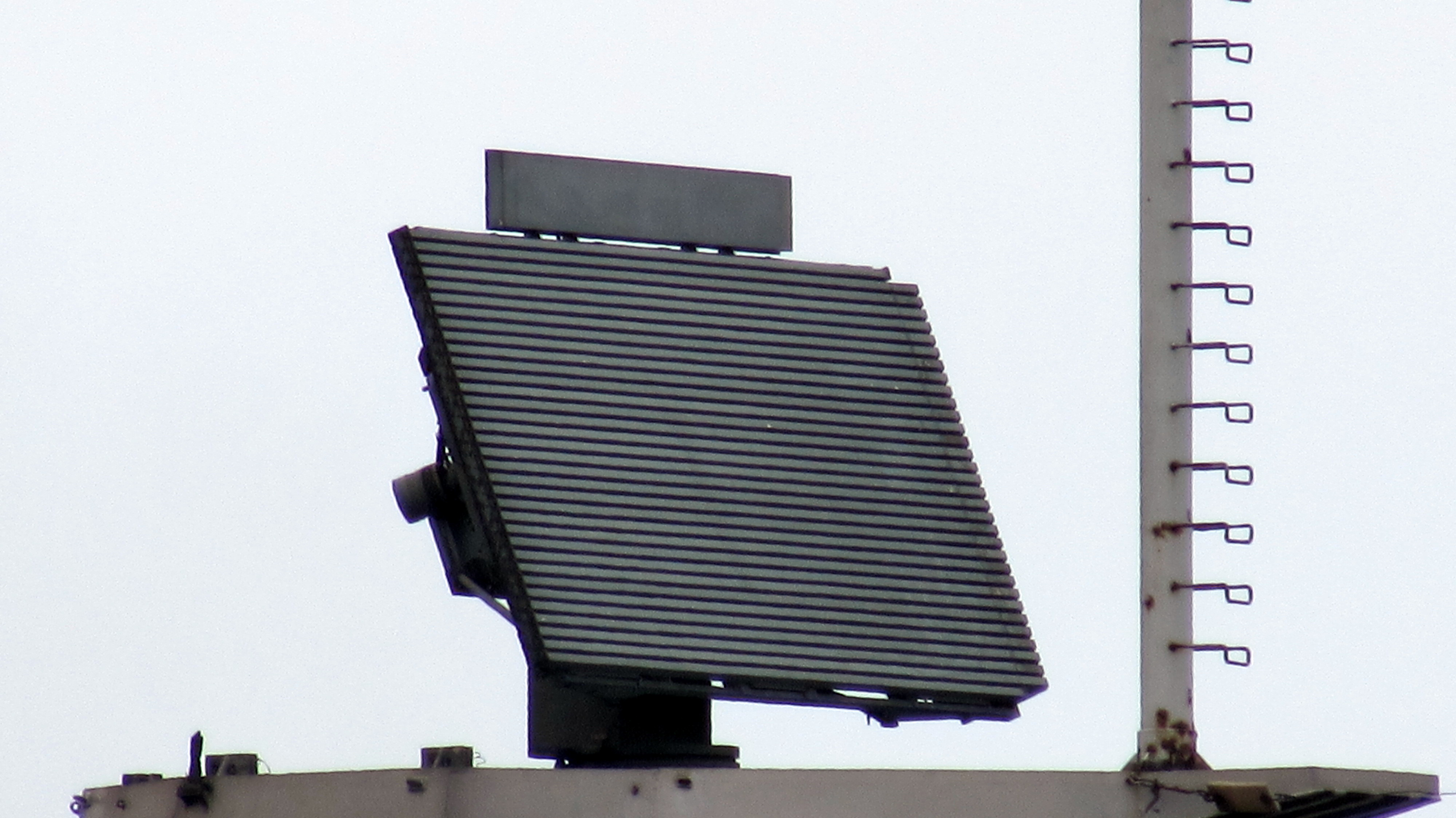
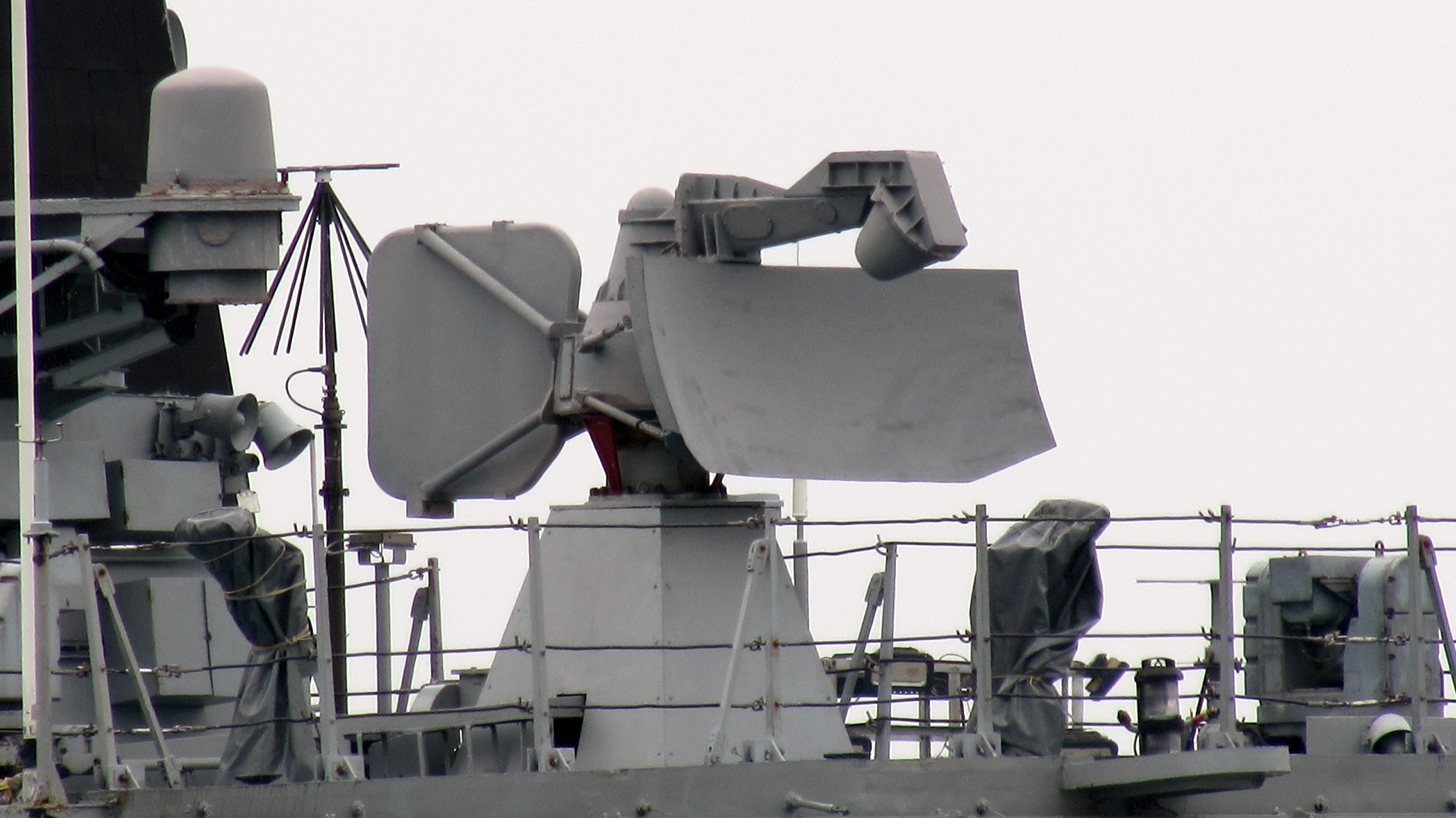
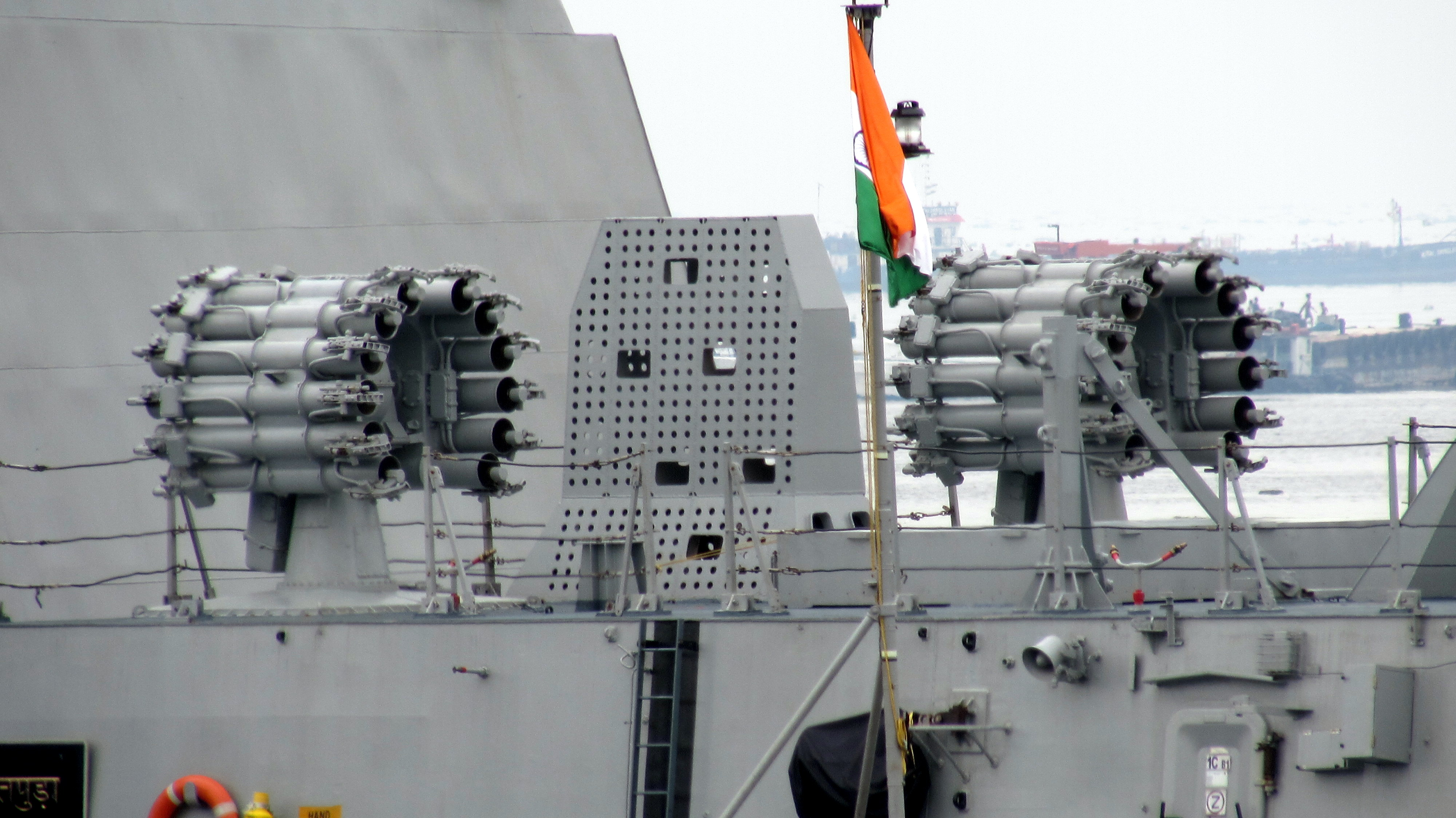
Weapons and sensors fitment on Shivalik-class.
(top) Fregat M2EM Radar, ELTA ELM-2238 Radar, BEL Aparna FCR, L&T RBU-6000 ASW rocket launcher.

=== Armament ===
The Shivalik-class frigates are equipped with a mix of Russian, Indian and Israeli weapon systems. These include the OTO Melara 76 mm SRGM naval gun, Klub and BrahMos supersonic anti-ship missiles (8 missiles, UVLM launcher), Shtil-1 anti-aircraft missiles (24 missiles, 3S-90 launcher), RBU-6000 anti-submarine rocket launchers and 6–324 mm ILAS 3 (2 triple) torpedoes. Two 8-cell VLS Barak SAM paired with two AK-630 act as close-in weapon systems (CIWS). The ships also carry two HAL Dhruv or Sea King Mk. 42B helicopters.

== Construction and service ==
All the three ships of the class were constructed at the Mazagon Dock Limited. The construction of the lead ship, Shivalik, commenced in December 2000. The ship's keel was laid in July 2001 and was launched in April 2003. It underwent sea trials in February 2009 before being commissioned in April 2010. The second ship, Satpura, was laid in October 2002. It was launched in June 2004 and commissioned in August 2011. The third and final ship, Sahyadri, was laid in September 2003, launched in May 2005 and commissioned in July 2012. All the three ships are named after hill ranges in India: Shivalik after the Sivalik Hills, Satpura after the Satpura range and Sahyadri after the Sahyadri range commonly called Western Ghats.

The lead ship of the class, INS Shivalik, was deployed in the North West Pacific for JIMEX 2012 (Japan-India Maritime Exercise) with four other ships which included INS Rana, a Rajput-class guided-missile destroyer, INS Shakti, a Deepak-class fleet tanker, and INS Karmuk, a Kora-class corvette, and took part in India's first bi-lateral maritime exercise with Japan. The Japanese Maritime Self-Defence Force (JMSDF) was represented by two destroyers, one maritime patrol aircraft and a helicopter. After the deployment in the north Pacific, the battle group was deployed in the South China Sea. As part of India's Look East policy, the ships visited the Shanghai port on 13 June 2012, for a five-day goodwill tour. INS Shakti served as the fuel and logistics tanker to the three destroyers. The ships left the port on 17 June 2012. Before leaving the port, the ships conducted a routine passage exercise with the People's Liberation Army Navy.

The second ship, INS Satpura, participated in the Malabar 2012 exercise with the United States Navy along with the Indian destroyers INS Ranvir, INS Ranvijay, corvette INS Kulish and replenishment oiler INS Shakti. The other ships which participated in the exercise included Carrier Strike Group (CSG) 1 of the US Navy, consisting of: USS Carl Vinson, embarked Carrier Air Wing (CVW) 17, the Ticonderoga-class guided-missile cruiser USS Bunker Hill and the Arleigh Burke-class guided-missile destroyer USS Halsey. Military Sealift Command's fast combat support ship USNS Bridge also provided support for the exercise.

INS Shivalik participated in the PLAN's 65th anniversary celebrations held in Qingdao sailing 4,500 miles from Port Blair without any assistance from support ships. India, Indonesia and China conducted three high-level exercises including an anti-hijack exercise.

== Ships ==
Name	Pennant	Builder	Laid Down	Launched	Sea Trials	Commissioned	Status
Shivalik	F47	Mazagon Dock Limited	11 July 2001	18 April 2003	February 2009	29 April 2010	Active
Satpura	F48	Mazagon Dock Limited	31 October 2002	4 June 2004	2010–2011	20 August 2011	Active
Sahyadri	F49	Mazagon Dock Limited	30 September 2003	27 May 2005	2011–2012	21 July 2012	Active

== Gallery ==
Related Images
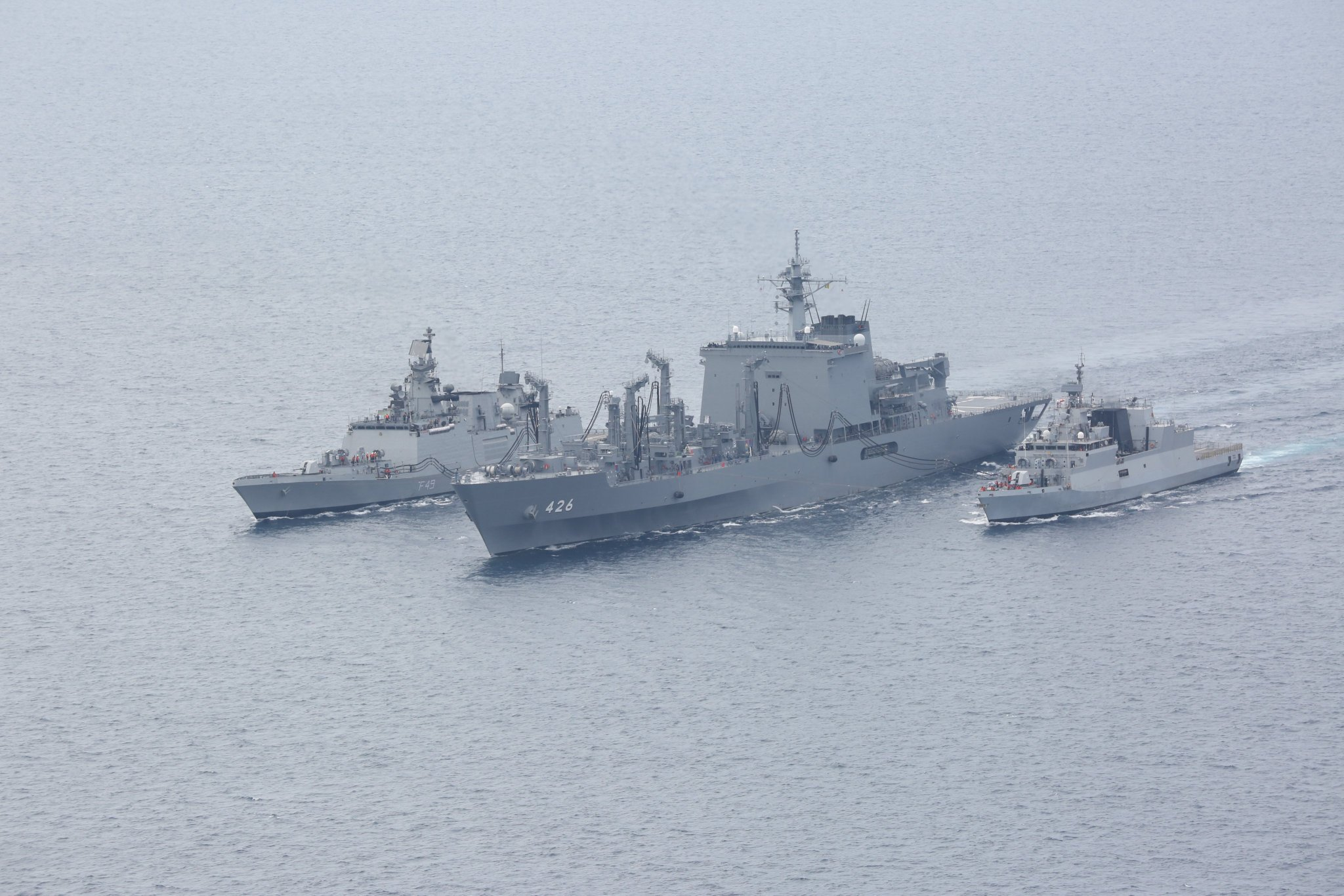
INS Sahyadri along with JMSDF JS Ōmi and a Kamorta-class corvette

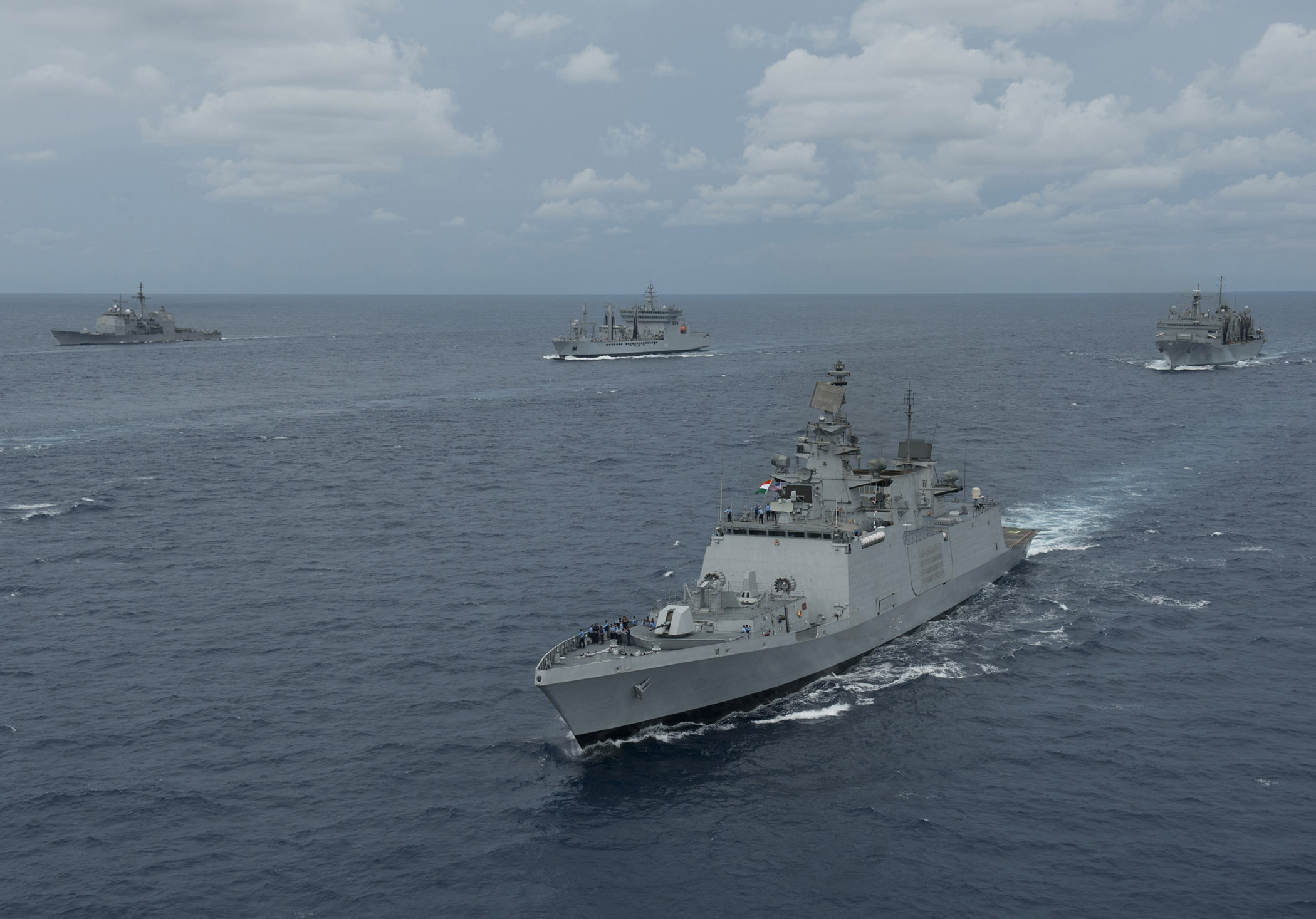
INS Satpura (F48) steams with U.S. and Indian ships in formation during Malabar 2012.

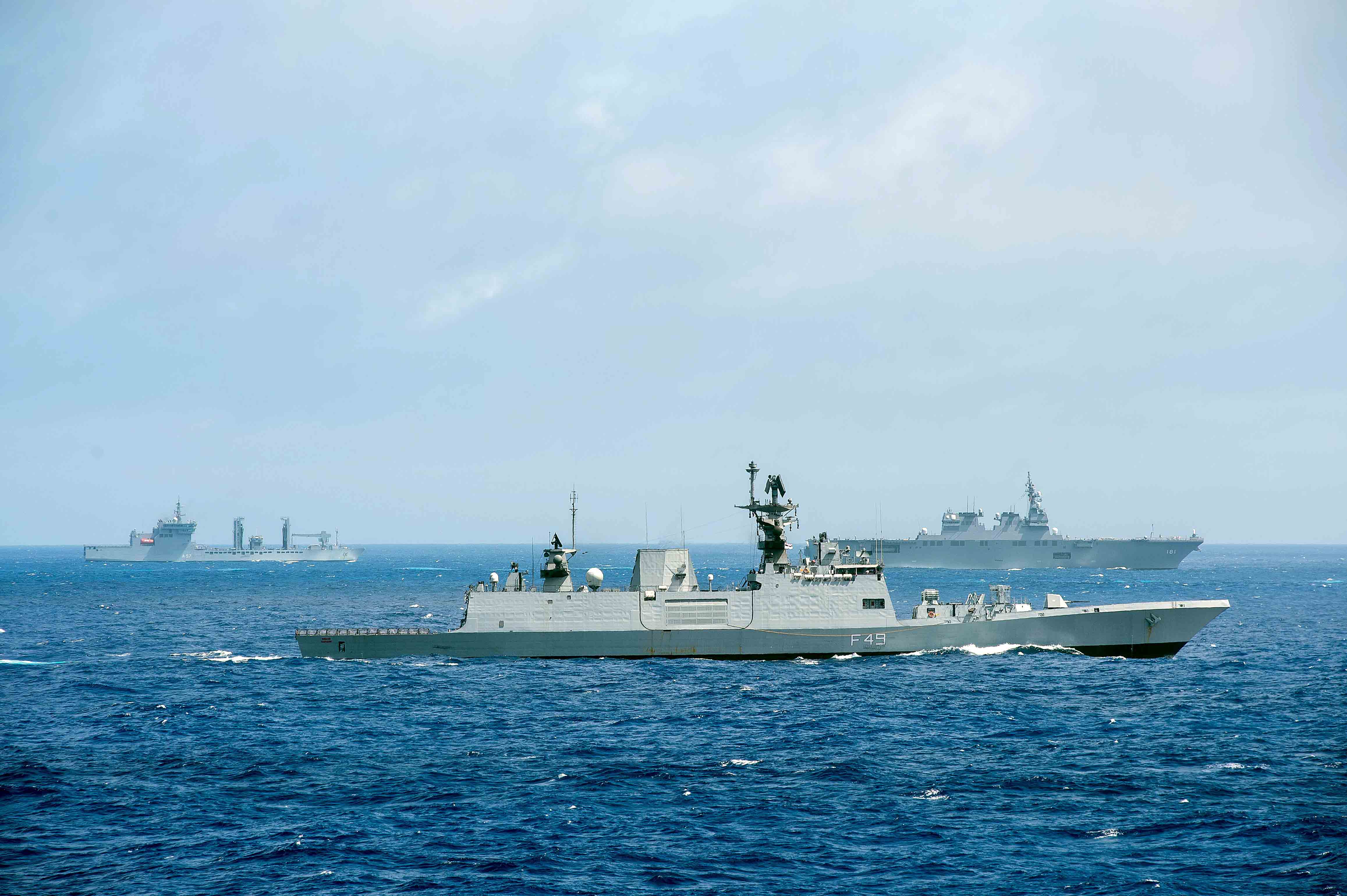
INS Shakti (A57), INS Sahyadri (F49) and JMSDF JS Hyūga transit together.

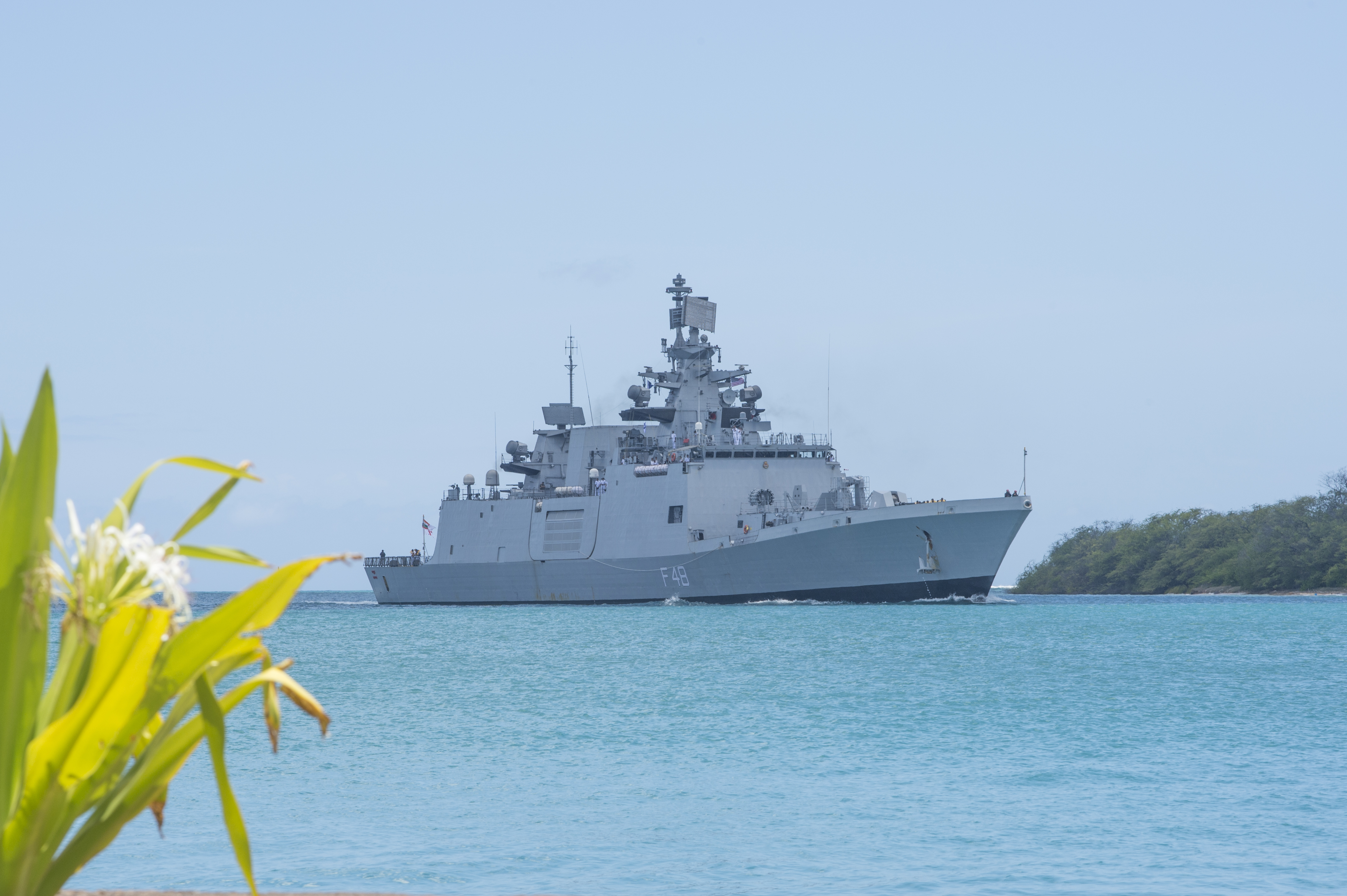
INS Satpura arrives at Joint Base Pearl Harbor-Hickam for Rim of the Pacific 2016.

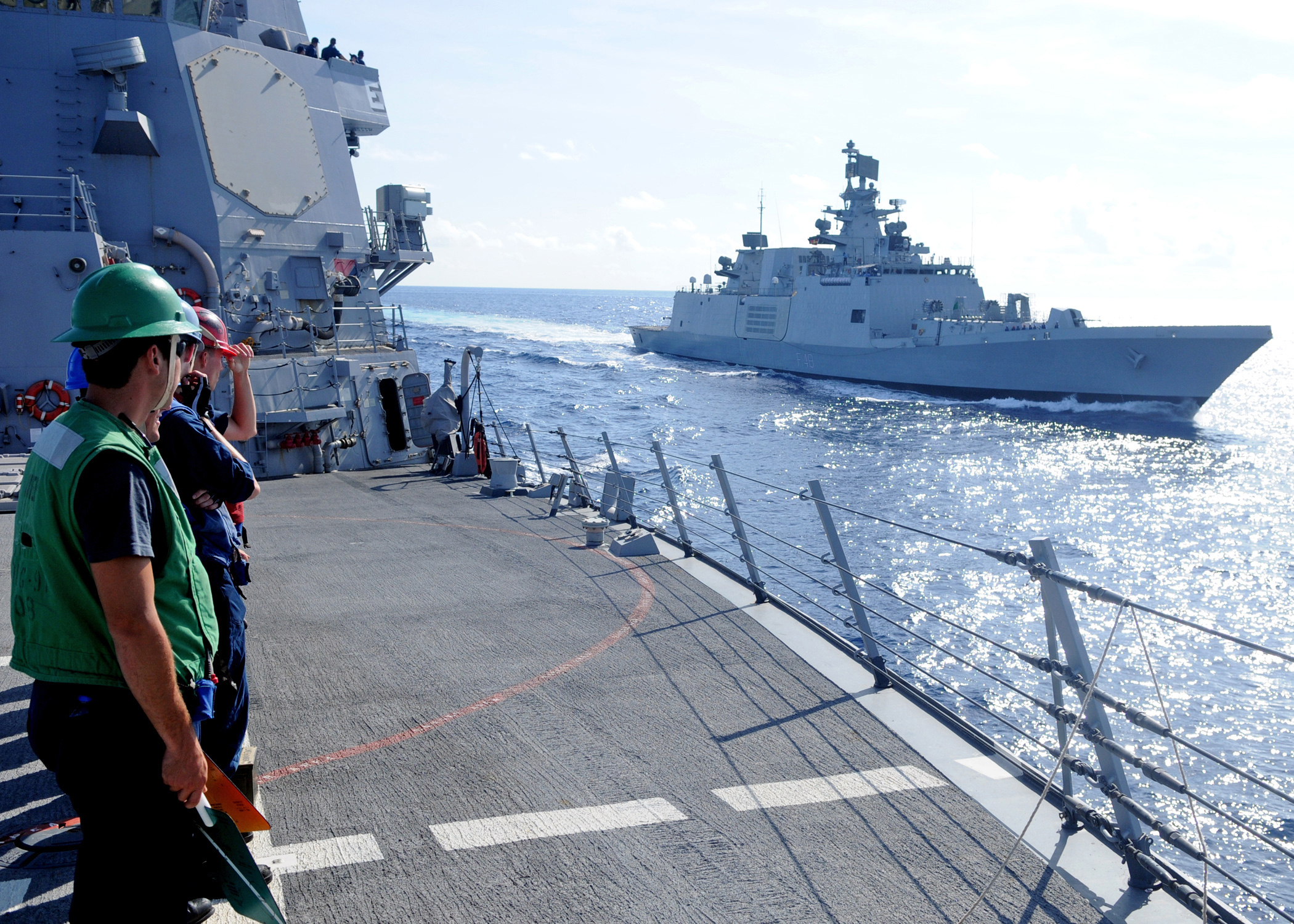
INS Satpura as seen from USS Halsey

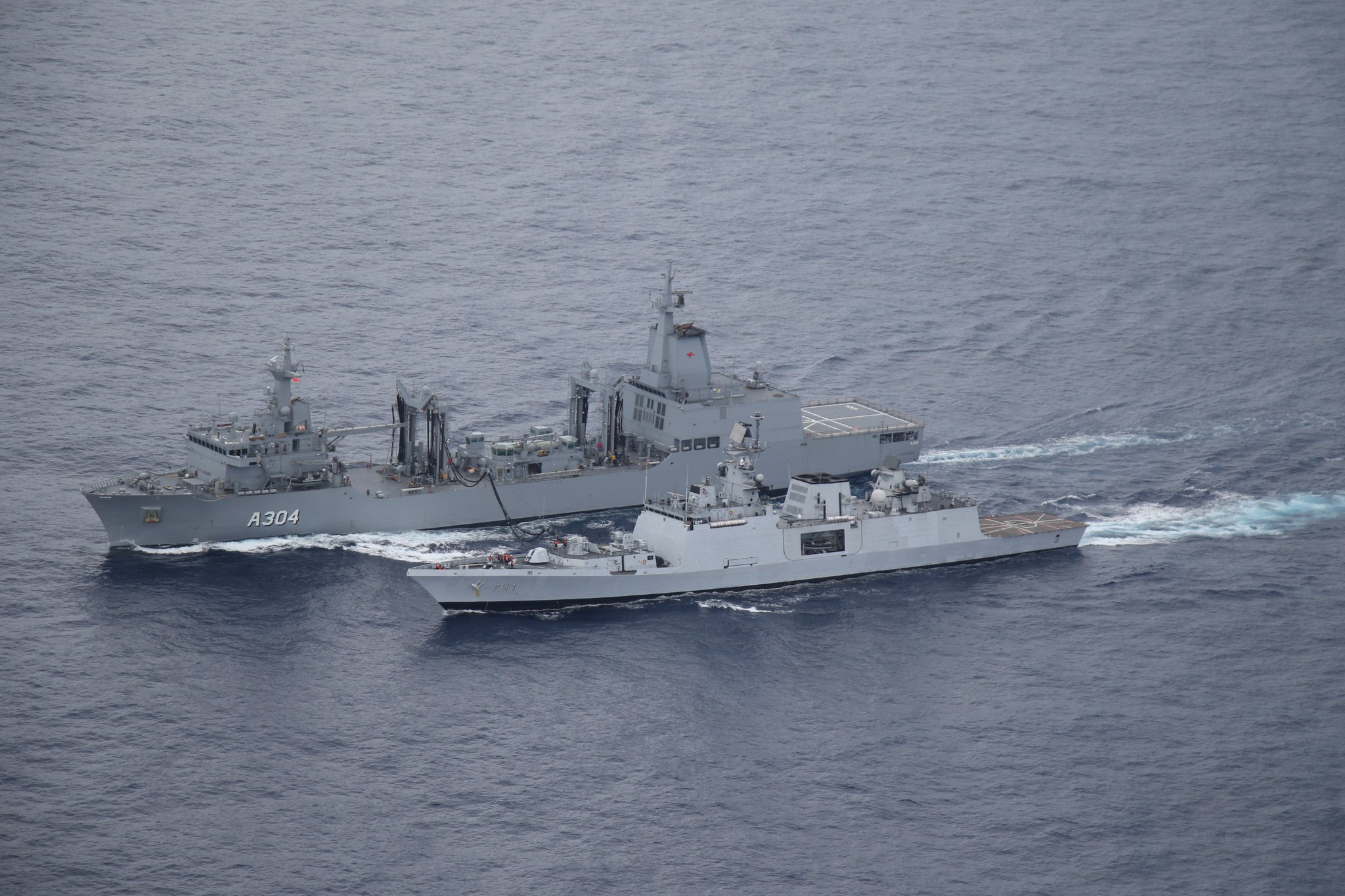
Shivalik undergoing replenishment from HMAS Stalwart during a Malabar exercise.

== See also ==
- Ships of the Indian Navy
- List of frigate classes in service

Equivalent frigates of the same era

- De Zeven Provinciën class
- Project 22350
- Sachsen class
- FREMM
- Iver Huitfeldt class
- Type 054A
- Álvaro de Bazán class
