= Kora-class corvette =

Class of Indian Navy corvettes

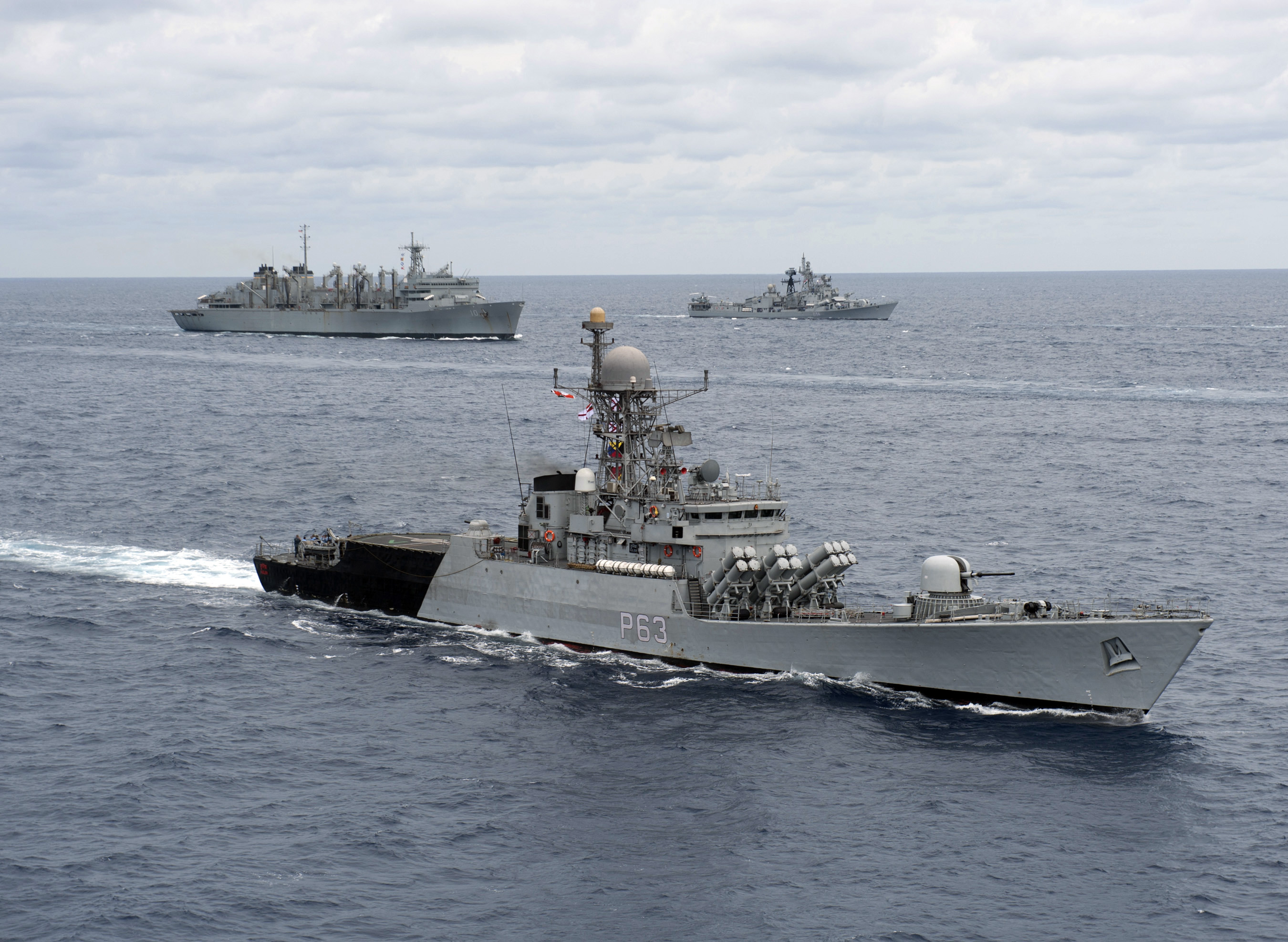
- INS Kulish (P63) during Exercise Malabar 2012

Class overview
- Name: Kora class
- Builders: GRSE
- Operators: Indian Navy; National Coast Guard of Mauritius
- Preceded by: Khukri class
- Succeeded by: Kamorta class
- Cost: ₹240 crore (equivalent to ₹955 crore or US$101 million in 2023) (India, FY 2001); ₹365 crore (equivalent to ₹583 crore or US$62 million in 2023) (Mauritius, FY 2014)
- Completed: 5
- Active: 5

General characteristics
- Type: Guided missile corvette
- Displacement: 1,460 short tons (1,320 t) (full load)
- Length: 91.1 m (299 ft)
- Beam: 10.5 m (34 ft)
- Draught: 4.5 m (15 ft)
- Propulsion: 2 × SEMT Pielstick/Kirloskar 18 PA6V 280 diesel engines (14,400 PS; 10,600 kW); 2 shafts
- Speed: 25 kn (46 km/h; 29 mph)
- Range: 4,000 mi (6,400 km) at 16 kn (30 km/h; 18 mph)
- Complement: 134 including 14 officers
- Sensors & processing systems: MR-352 (NATO: Cross Dome) E/F-band air search radar; Granit Garpun B (NATO: Plank Shave) I/J-band air and surface search radar; MR-123 (NATO: Bass Tilt) H/I-band fire control radar (P61 only); BEL Lynx I-band fire control radar (P62, P63 and P64); BEL 1245 I-band navigation radar
- Electronic warfare & decoys: BEL Ajanta P electronic support measures; 2 × PK-10 chaff launchers; BEL TOTED towed torpedo decoys
- Armament: 16 × Kh-35 (SS-N-25) SSM (4 x quad launchers); SA-N-5 Grail launcher for air defence missiles; 1 × 76 mm 59-cal AK-176 (P61 and P62); 1 × 76 mm 62-cal Otobreda-76/62C (P63 and P64); 2 × 30 mm 65-cal AK-630 CIWS
- Aircraft carried: 1 × HAL Dhruv or HAL Chetak

Kora-class corvettes, also known as Project 25A, are guided missile corvettes, in active service with the Indian Navy and the National Coast Guard of Mauritius. Four vessels were built at Garden Reach Shipbuilders and Engineers (GRSE) and outfitted at Mazagon Dock Limited (MDL).

== Design ==
The primary role of the Kora class is as surface combatants, representing a modernized version of the prior Khukri-class corvette. They are armed with four quad-launchers for 3M-24 anti-ship missiles (Russian: Kh-35 Uran, NATO: SS-N-25 Switchblade) as opposed to the two dual launchers for P-15 Termit ASMs (NATO: SS-N-2D Styx) of its predecessor. The 3M-24E missile is guided by homing active radar and can carry a 145 kg (320 lb) warhead to a range of 130 km (81 mi) at Mach 0.9 speed. They are powered by two SEMT Pielstick/Kirloskar 18 PA6V 280 diesel engines. A HAL Chetak or HAL Dhruv helicopter can operate from the vessels. The vessels are also supplied with Strela-2M ManPADS (NATO: SA-N-5 Grail), which have a range of 4.2 km (2.6 mi) and a speed of Mach 1.75. INS Kulish is equipped with two Igla surface-to-air missile launchers (NATO: SA-18 Grouse).

The first two corvettes of the subclass are armed with a 76 mm (3.0 in) AK-176 dual-purpose gun and two 30 mm (1.2 in) AK-630 CIWS. The AK-176 can fire at the rate of 120 rounds-per-minute (RPM) to a range of 15.5 km (9.6 mi), while the AK-630 can fire at 3,000RPM to a range of 2 km (1.2 mi). INS Kirch and INS Kulish are fitted with a 76 mm (3.0 in) Otobreda super rapid gun firing 120 RPM.

The sensor suite includes a MR-352 Pozitiv-E (Cross Dome) air or surface search radar, Bharat 1245 navigation radar and BEL Rani navigation radar. The MR-352 radar can track targets within a range of 130 km (81 mi). Fire control is provided by Garpun-Bal and MR-123 radars. The Garpun-Bal radar combines active and passive channels and in the active target designation mode, it operates in X-band (I/J-band) and can handle up to 150 targets at ranges between 35–45 km (22–28 mi), although it is possible to obtain ranges of more than 180 km (110 mi) in wave-guide propagation conditions.

The corvettes are fitted with the Ajanta P Mk II Electronic Support Measures system. There are four PK-10 chaff launchers and two towed torpedo decoys to deceive incoming anti-ship missiles and torpedoes. PK-10 is a 10 tube 120 mm (4.7 in) barrage chaff launcher that can fire 80 rounds at a time.

The Kora class is powered by two diesel engines driving two controllable pitch propellers through two shafts. Each engine is rated at 7,100 horsepower (5,300 kW). Four diesel alternators rated at 350 kW are provided for power generation. The propulsion system provides a top speed of 25 kn (46 km/h; 29 mph), an average speed of 16 kn (30 km/h; 18 mph) and a maximum range of 4,000 nmi (7,400 km; 4,600 mi).

Each ship cost in 2001 approximately ₹240 crore (equivalent to ₹955 crore or US$101 million in 2023). A simpler version exported to Mauritius in 2014 cost approximately ₹365 crore (equivalent to ₹583 crore or US$62 million in 2023).

== History ==
The Kora-class corvettes were designed by India's Naval design bureau under Project 25A, as a replacement for the Russian-designed Petya II-class corvettes of the Indian Navy. The first two were ordered in April 1990 and latter two in October 1994. The class was to be outfitted with the Trishul SAM, but following the cancellation of the Trishul project, a shoulder-launched SAM was adopted.

INS Kora undertook a goodwill visit to Singapore in mid-2001. The corvette participated in the Republic of Singapore Navy Day celebrations followed by the International Maritime Defence Exhibition (IMDEX) Asia 2001. The participation of INS Kora in the International Maritime Defence Exhibition was a showcase of the Indian shipbuilding industry and its indigenous efforts.

== Export ==
In 2012, it was reported that Mauritius had ordered 2 vessels based on this class from the Garden Reach Shipbuilders.

== Ships of this class ==
Name	Pennant	Builder	Laid down	Launched	Commissioned	Status
Indian Navy
Kora	P61	GRSE	10 January 1990	23 September 1992	10 August 1998	Active
Kirch	P62	GRSE	31 January 1990	28 September 1995	22 January 2001	Active
Kulish	P63	GRSE	4 October 1995	18 August 1997	20 August 2001	Active
Karmuk	P64	GRSE	27 August 1997	6 April 2000	4 February 2004	Active
National Coast Guard of Mauritius
Barracuda	C31	GRSE	23 April 2012	2 August 2013	12 March 2015	Active

== Gallery ==
Kora-class corvette images at sea.
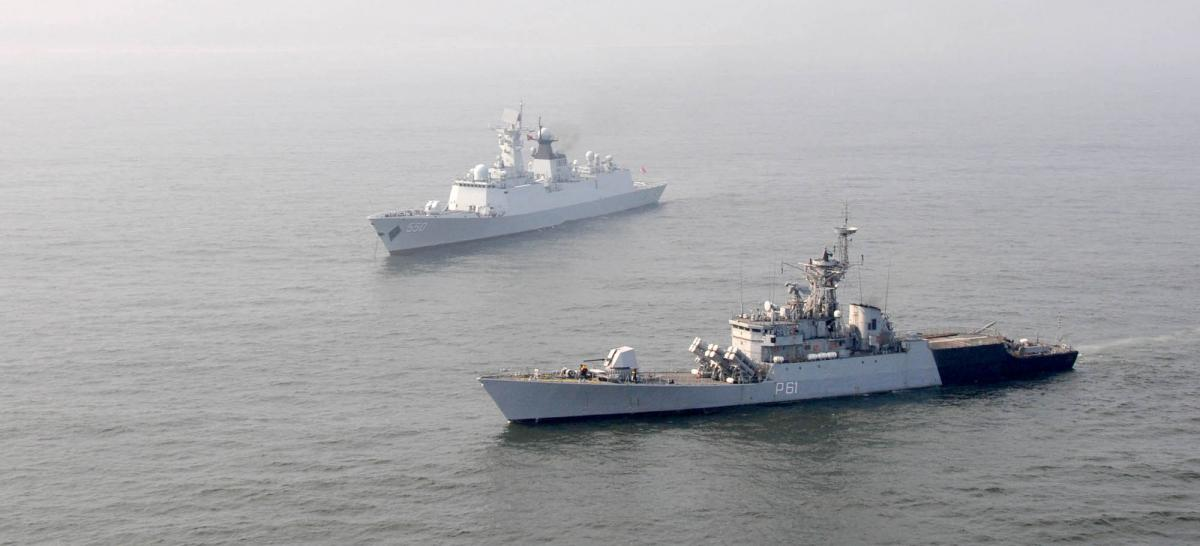
INS Kora escorting PLA Navy Ship Weifang off Visakhapatnam, India.

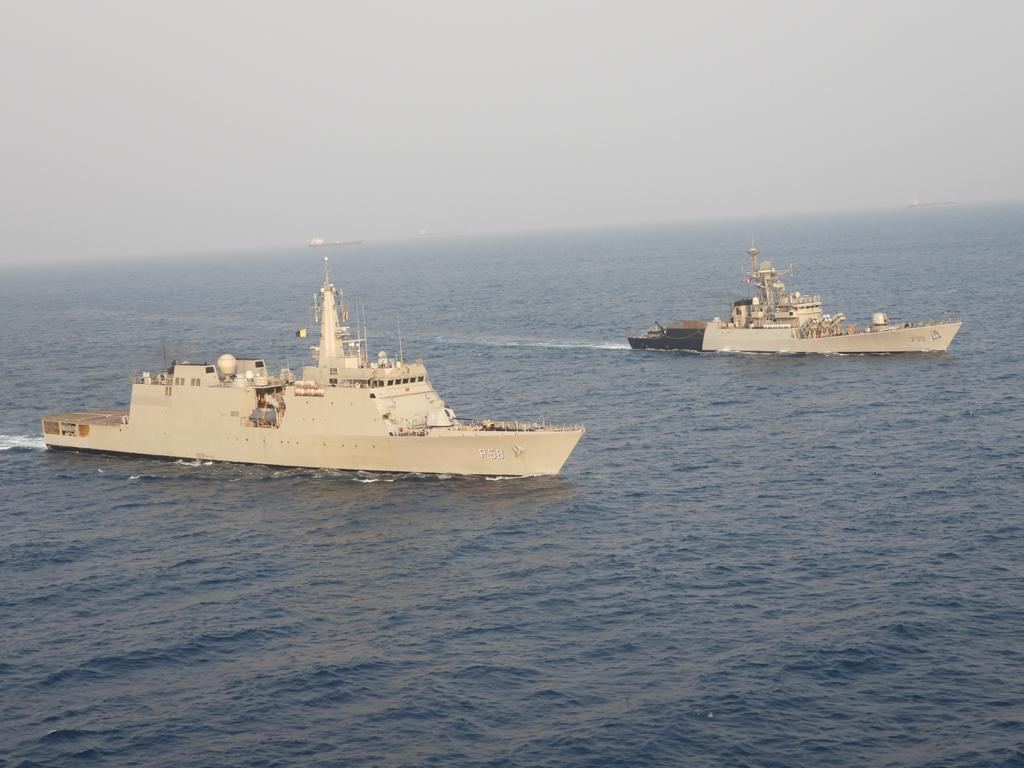
INS Sumedha (P58) and INS Kulish (P63) enroute to Bangladesh.

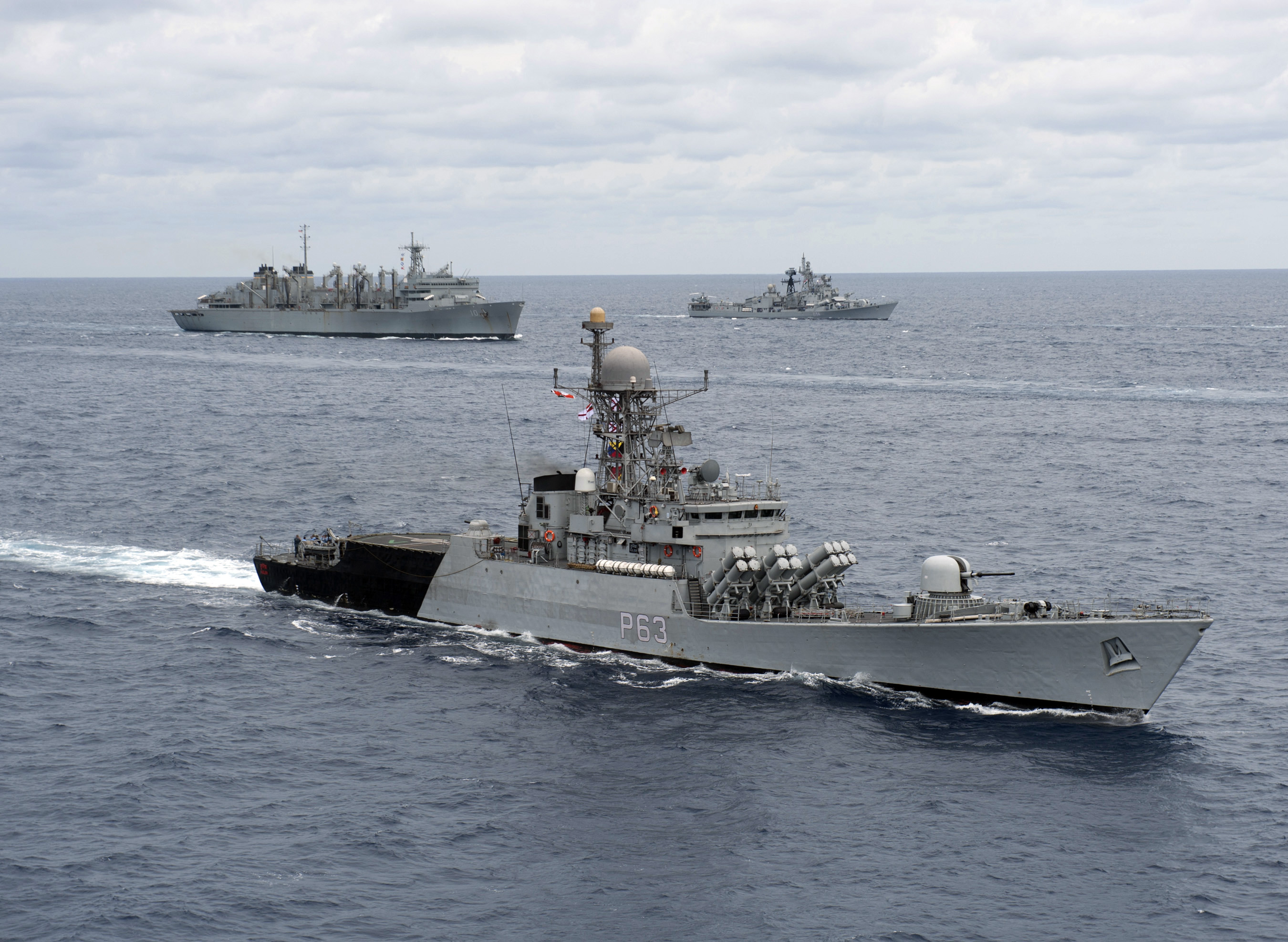
INS Kulish (P63) underway with U.S. Navy during Exercise Malabar 2012.

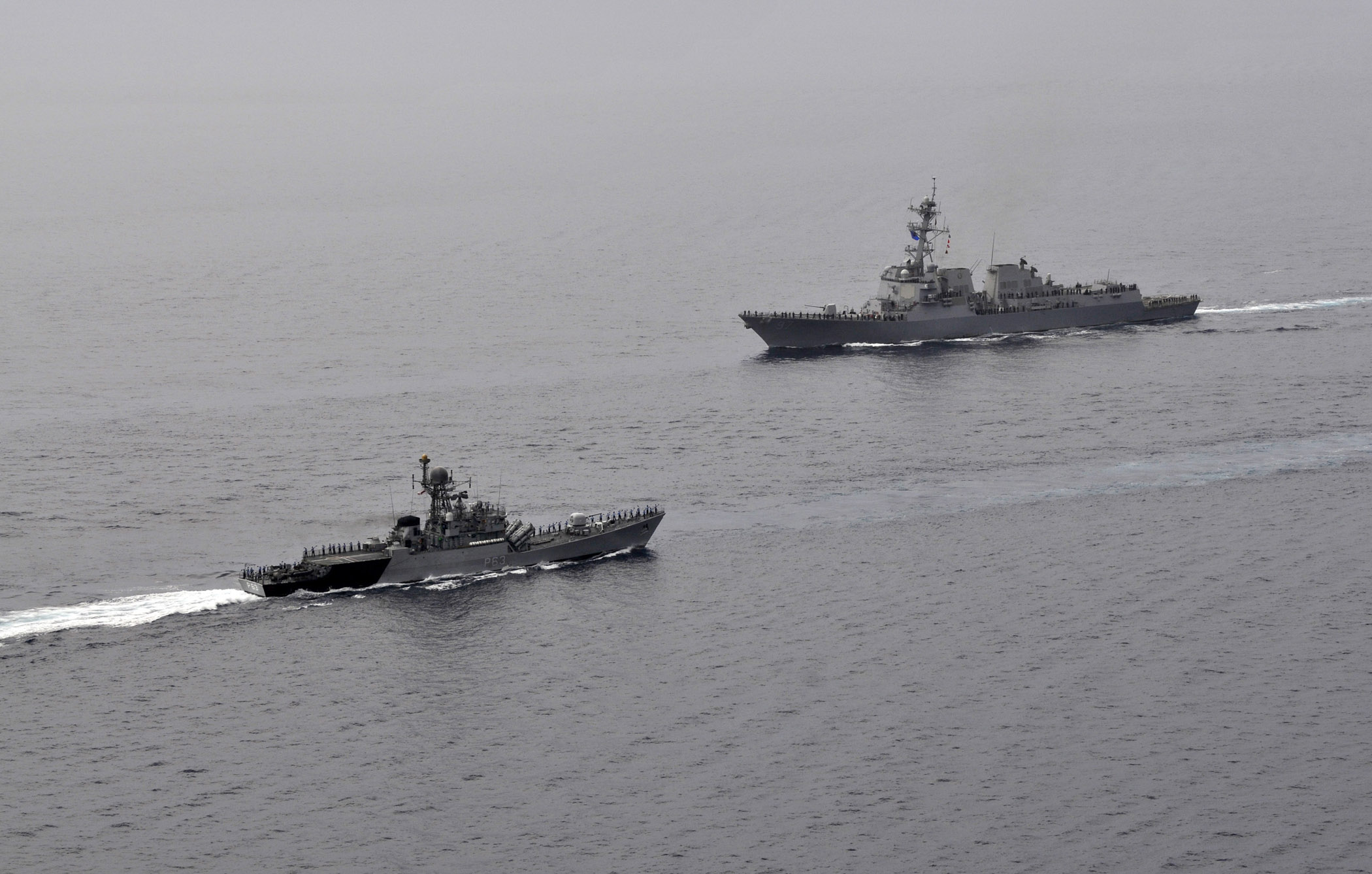
INS Kulish, left, passes USS Halsey during Malabar 2012.

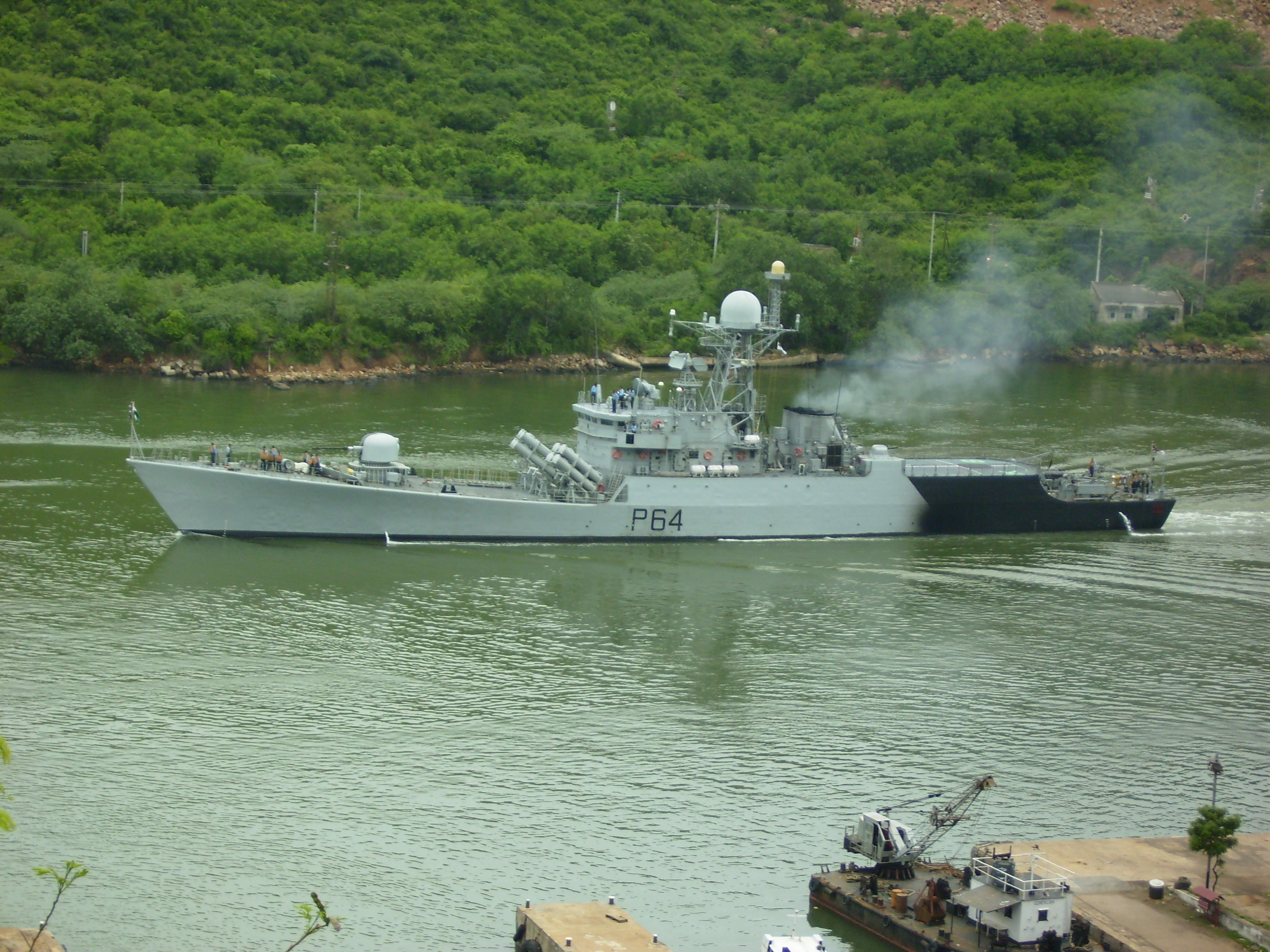
INS Karmuk at Visakhapatnam, India.

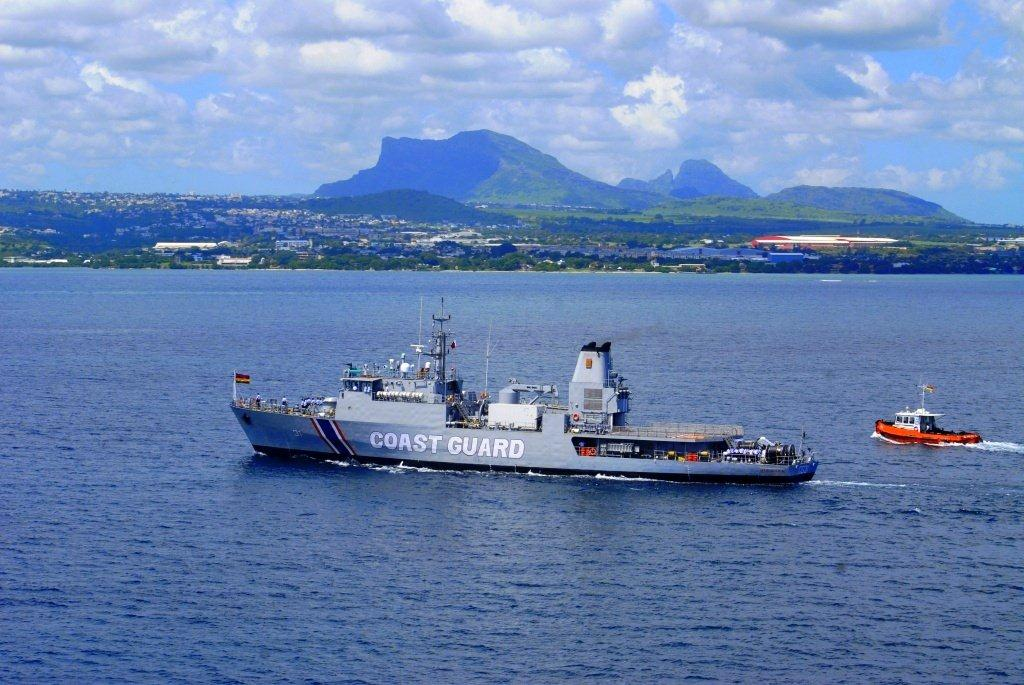
MCGS Barracuda a derivative of Kora-class corvette en-route to Mauritius for delivery to National Coast Guard Mauritius.

== In popular culture ==
INS Kirch (P62) and INS Kulish (P63) were featured in the Bollywood film Ab Tumhare Hawale Watan Sathiyo, where they are seen accompanying the Rajput-class destroyer INS Ranvir (D54).

== See also ==
- List of active Indian Navy ships
