= INS Satpura =

Indian stealth multi-role fritage

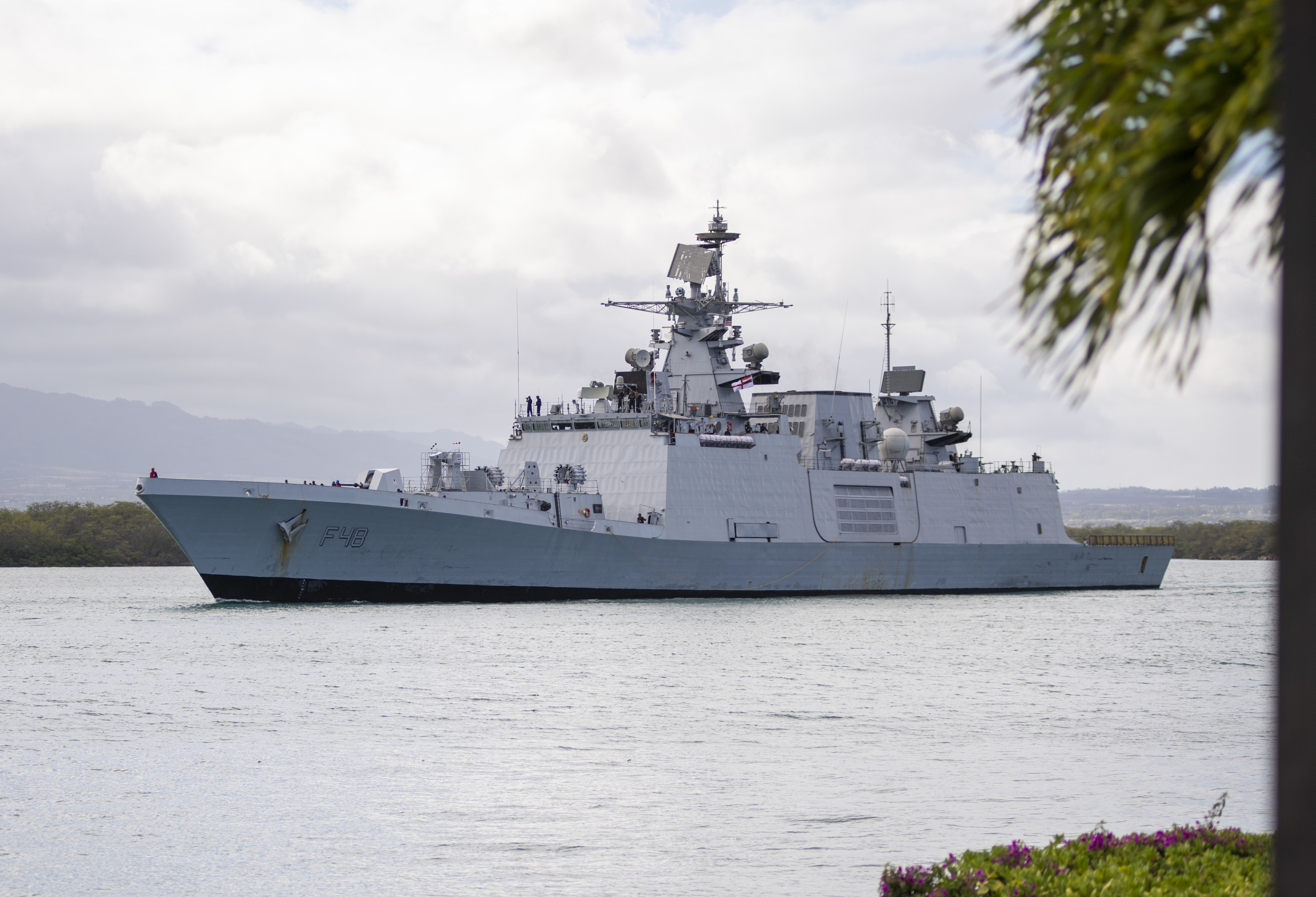
- INS Satpura (F 48) departs Pearl Harbor to begin the Rim of the Pacific (RIMPAC) 2022 exercise, July 12

History

India
- Name: Satpura
- Namesake: Satpura range
- Builder: Mazagon Dock Limited
- Laid down: 31 October 2002
- Launched: 4 June 2004
- Commissioned: 20 August 2011
- Identification: Pennant number: F48
- Motto: Nishchay, Garv, Sahas; (Determination, Pride, Bravery)
- Status: Active

General characteristics
- Class & type: Shivalik-class frigate
- Displacement: 6,200 tonnes (6,100 long tons; 6,800 short tons) full load
- Length: 142.5 m (468 ft)
- Beam: 16.9 m (55 ft)
- Draught: 4.5 m (15 ft)
- Installed power: 2 × Pielstick 16 PA6 STC Diesel engines (11,300 kW each); 2 × GE LM2500+ (25,100 kW each)
- Propulsion: CODOG
- Speed: 32 knots (59 km/h; 37 mph); 22 knots (41 km/h; 25 mph) (diesel engines)
- Complement: 257 (including 35 officers + 222 sailors)
- Sensors & processing systems: Radar :-; 1 x Fregat M2EM 3-D radar (Surface & Air); 4 × MR-90 Orekh radar; 1 × Elta EL/M-2238 STAR; 2 × Elta EL/M 2221 STGR; 1 × BEL APARNA; Sonar :-; BEL HUMSA-NG active/passive sonar; Thales Sintra active towed-array sonar; Combat Suite :-; "Combat Management System" (CMS-17A)
- Electronic warfare & decoys: BEL Ellora electronic warfare suite; Decoy:-; 4 x Kavach decoy launchers
- Armament: Anti-air missiles: 1 × Shtil-1 single-arm surface-to-air missile launcher (24 missiles); 32-cell VLS for Barak 1 point-defence surface-to-air missiles; Anti-ship/Land-attack missiles: 8 × VLS launched BrahMos, anti-ship and land-attack cruise missiles; Guns: 1 × OTO Melara 76 mm naval gun; 2 × AK-630 CIWS; 2 × OFT 12.7 mm M2 Stabilized Remote Controlled Gun; Anti-submarine warfare: 2 × 2 DTA-53-956 torpedo launchers; 2 × RBU-6000 (RPK-8) rocket launchers
- Aircraft carried: 2 × HAL Dhruv or Sea King Mk. 42B helicopters.

INS Satpura (F48) is a Shivalik-class stealth multi-role frigate built for the Indian Navy. This class is an improvement over the preceding Talwar-class frigates with increased stealth and land attack features.

== Construction ==
INS Satpura was built at the Mazagon Dock Limited (MDL) in Mumbai. The keel was laid on 31 October 2002 and was launched on 4 June 2004. She was completed in 2010 and underwent sea trials before being commissioned on 20 August 2011 into the Eastern Naval Command headquartered at Visakhapatnam.

== Service history ==
Deployment	Date	Port Visited	Commander	Notes and References
2012
Malabar 2012 with naval destroyers INS Ranvir, INS Ranvijay, corvette INS Kulish and fleet-tanker INS Shakti.		Bay of Bengal		
2013
South East Asia with naval destroyer INS Ranvijay, corvette INS Kirch and fleet-tanker INS Shakti	6 May	Da Nang, Vietnam		
South East Asia with naval destroyer INS Ranvijay, corvette INS Kirch and fleet-tanker INS Shakti	28 May	Changi, Singapore		Participated in IMDEX-13
2015
South East Asia with naval destroyer INS Ranvir, corvette INS Kamorta and fleet tanker INS Shakti	23-26 May	Singapore	Captain Hari Krishnan	SIMBEX-15 with Singapore Navy
South East Asia with naval destroyer INS Ranvir, corvette INS Kamorta and fleet tanker INS Shakti	4-6 June	Fremantle, Australia	Captain Hari Krishnan	
South East Asia with naval destroyer INS Ranvir, corvette INS Kamorta and fleet tanker INS Shakti	28-30 June	Sattahip, Thailand	Captain Hari Krishnan	
2016
South China Sea and the Western Pacific Ocean	30 May to 3 June	Cam Ranh Bay, Vietnam	Captain A N Pramod	
South China Sea and the Western Pacific Ocean	13-15 August	Port Majuro, Marshall Islands	Captain A N Pramod	
South China Sea and the Western Pacific Ocean	30 June – 4 August	Hawaii, United States	Captain A N Pramod	25th edition of the RIMPAC Exercise
South China Sea and the Western Pacific Ocean	18-20 August	Pohnpei, Micronesia	Captain A N Pramod	
South China Sea and the Western Pacific Ocean	31 August – 3 September	Singapore	Captain A N Pramod	

On 8 October 2024, INS Satpura hosted the opening ceremony of Exercise Malabar at Visakhapatnam under the aegis of the Eastern Naval Command.

In July 2025, INS Satpura was deployed in the South East Asia as part of the four-ship flotilla under the command of Rear admiral Susheel Menon, the FOCEF. The flotilla included INS Delhi (D61), INS Shakti (A57) and INS Kiltan (P30). The flotilla called on Singapore from 16 to 19 July.

Later, Satpura joined the Republic of Singapore Navy's RSS Supreme and RSS Vigilance conduct the 32nd edition of SIMBEX, which is the acronym for Singapore India Maritime Bilateral Exercise. The exercise was hosted by Singapore from 28 July to 1 August. The harbour phase was held at RSS Singapura base and was followed by the sea phase in the southern parts of South China Sea. The RSN's ships were also supported by MV Mentor. The Republic of Singapore Air Force also participated in the exercise with an S-70B Seahawk naval helicopter, two Fokker-50 maritime patrol aircraft and two F-15SG fighter aircraft. During the sea phase, the participating forces carried out advanced warfare drills, including gunnery firings, air defence exercises, and maritime security operations. The sea phase concluded with a ceremonial sail-past by the participating ships.

On 20 September 2025, Satpura arrived at the Port of Colombo, Sri Lanka, on a replenishment visit under the command of Captain Vikas Garg.

On 26 November 2025, the ship along with INS Ranvir, INS Himgiri and INS Udaygiri visited the Port of Chennai as part of the year's Navy Day Celebrations. The visit saw the participation of over 930 students, 375 NCC cadets as well as 364 officer cadets from Officers Training Academy, Chennai. She also participated at the International Fleet Review 2026 held at Visakapatanam. In 2026 INS Satpura won the Award of Best Ship 2025-26.

== Gallery ==
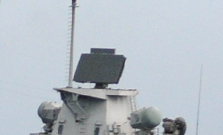
The EL/M-2238 STAR radar onboard Satpura
