= INS Kulish =

Kora class corvette

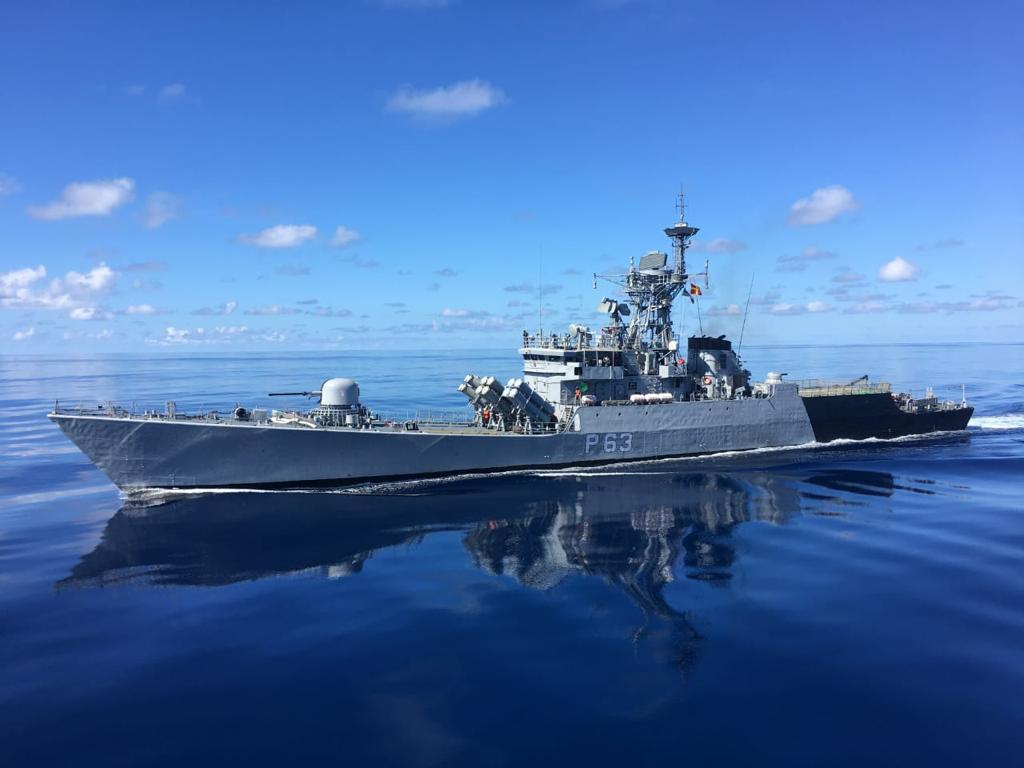
- INS Kulish (P63) en-route to Myanmar

History

India
- Name: INS Kulish
- Namesake: Thunderbolt
- Builder: Garden Reach Shipbuilders and Engineers
- Laid down: 4 October 1995
- Launched: 19 August 1997
- Commissioned: 20 August 2001
- Identification: Pennant number: P63
- Status: Active
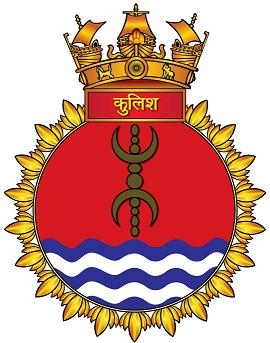
- Badge: Crest of INS Kulish

General characteristics
- Class & type: Kora-class corvette
- Displacement: 1,400 tons full load
- Length: 91.1 m (298 ft 11 in)
- Beam: 10.5 m (34 ft 5 in)
- Draught: 4.5 m (14 ft 9 in)
- Propulsion: 2 diesel motors with 14,400 hp (10,700 kW); 2 shafts
- Speed: 25 knots (46 km/h; 29 mph)
- Range: 4,000 mi (6,400 km) at 16 knots (30 km/h; 18 mph)
- Complement: 134 (incl 14 officers)
- Sensors & processing systems: 1 × MR 352 Pozitiv-E radar; Bharat 1245 navigation radar; Bharat Vympel IPN-10 combat data system
- Armament: 16 × Kh-35 Uran-E SSM; 2 × Strela-2M (SA-N-5) SAM; 1 × 76.2 mm AK–176M gun; 2 × 30 mm AK-630 guns
- Aircraft carried: 1 HAL Chetak or HAL Dhruv helicopter
- Notes: Home Port-Port Blair

INS Kulish is a Kora-class corvette, currently in active service with the Indian Navy. She was ordered in October 1994, and the keel was laid in October 1995. The ship was launched in August 1997 and was commissioned on 20 August 2001.

Kulish is the third of the four Kora-class corvettes designed under Project25A. She is armed with the P-15 Termit anti-ship missiles and Strela-2 anti-air missiles.

== Etymology ==
The word Kulish is of Sanskrit origin and translates to thunderbolt. It is the name of a weapon of Lord Indra.

== Armament ==
INS Kulish is primarily designed as a surface combatant. It is armed with four quad launchers for sixteen Kh-35 Uran-E anti-ship missiles with a range of 130 kilometres (81 mi). The anti-air defence is provided by two mobile shoulder based Strela-2 SAM systems. It is fitted with an Otobreda 76 mm (3.0 in) main gun while two AK-630 30 mm (1.2 in) guns act as CIWS. In addition, the ship carries one HAL Chetak or HAL Dhruv helicopter.

== Construction ==
The Naval Design Bureau under Project 25A designed the Kora-class corvettes. INS Kulish along with INS Karmuk were ordered in October 1994 by the Indian Navy. Her keel was laid in October 1995 and she was launched in August 1997 before being commissioned on 20 August 2001 by the then Governor of West Bengal, Viren J. Shah, at Kolkata.

During the commissioning ceremony, the Governor of West Bengal stressed the need for the development of indigenous defence equipment. The Flag Officer Commander-in-Chief of the navy's Eastern Naval Command John C. DeSilva said "INS Kulish, suited for picket duties, would act as an effective sentinel in the Eastern Command in the Indian Maritime zone".

== Operational history ==
INS Kulish visited the Shanghai naval base in 2003 as part of a three-vessel fleet, for a five-day official visit. The fleet was commanded by flag officer Rear Admiral R. P. Suthan of India's Eastern Naval Command. It comprised a guided missile destroyer INS Ranjit, a fleet tanker INS Jyoti and the Kulish. The fleet held airborne and surface search and rescue exercises with China's East Sea Fleet, which were code-named "Dolphin 0311". Before the joint exercise, the Chinese and Indian ships also conducted maritime communication and formation manoeuvres. These were the first joint naval exercises between China and India. The fleet left Shanghai on 14 November 2003.

In May 2010, the navy's Eastern Fleet deployed INS Kulish, along with guided-missile destroyers INS Rana and INS Ranjit and fleet tanker INS Jyoti from Port Blair to South East Asia, where the fleet undertook passage exercises with the navies of Indonesia, Singapore and Australia. The fleet sailed under the command of Flag Officer Commanding, Eastern Fleet, Rear Admiral P N Murugesan and made port calls at Jakarta (Indonesia), Hai Phong (Vietnam), Manila (Philippines), Muara (Brunei), Bangkok (Thailand), Fremantle (Australia), Singapore and Port Kelang (Malaysia). At Port Kelang, the fleet conducted anti-piracy exercises with the Royal Malaysian Navy from 20 to 23 June, and left port on 23 June.

INS Kulish participated in the Malabar 2012 exercise with the United States Navy along with destroyers INS Ranvir, INS Ranvijay, frigate INS Satpura and replenishment oiler INS Shakti. The other ships which participated in the exercise included the Carrier Strike Group (CSG) 1 of the US Navy, comprising USS Carl Vinson, embarked Carrier Air Wing (CVW) 17, Ticonderoga-class guided-missile cruiser USS Bunker Hill and Arleigh Burke-class guided-missile destroyer USS Halsey. The Military Sealift Command's fast combat support ship USNS Bridge also provided support for the exercise.

INS Kulish along with INS Rana participated in the Navy Day celebrations in December 2011 when it was commanded by Lieutenant Commander Rajneesh Dalal. Both the ships hosted more than 1,200 people who came to watch the programme in commemoration of Navy Day. Kulish was part of the seven ships that took part in the programme in commemoration of Navy Day 2013. The other ships included the amphibious transport dock INS Jalashwa, guided missile destroyer INS Ranvijay, frigates INS Satpura, INS Shivalik and corvettes INS Khukri, INS Khanjar.

Kulish was part of a seven-ship fleet which represented the Eastern Naval Command at Indian Navy's annual TROPEX exercise, which concluded on 1 March 2013. TROPEX 2013 was a month-long theatre level exercise which was conducted off India's west coast. The navy conducted manoeuvres, weapon firings and tactical evaluation. The other ships in the flotilla were the destroyer INS Rana, amphibious dock INS Jalashwa, corvettes INS Karmuk and INS Sukanya and fleet tanker INS Jyoti, and it was led by INS Ranvijay under the command of Admiral Ajith Kumar P, Flag Officer Commanding Eastern Fleet. This flotilla made a port call at Kochi on 4 March 2013, en route to its forward deployment.

The ship arrived at the Ream Naval Base in Cambodia on 12 September 2026 as part of the Eastern Fleet Operational Deployment to strengthen maritime cooperation with the Royal Cambodian Navy. Kulish was joined by INS Sahyadri (F49) upon reaching Subic Bay, the Philippines for participation in ASEAN Defence Ministers’ Meeting (ADMM)-Plus Joint Cooperation Activity (JCA). The ASEAN-India Maritime Exercise (AIME 2026) concluded on 3 October. On 8 October, she reached Tuas Terminal, Singapore.

== Gallery ==
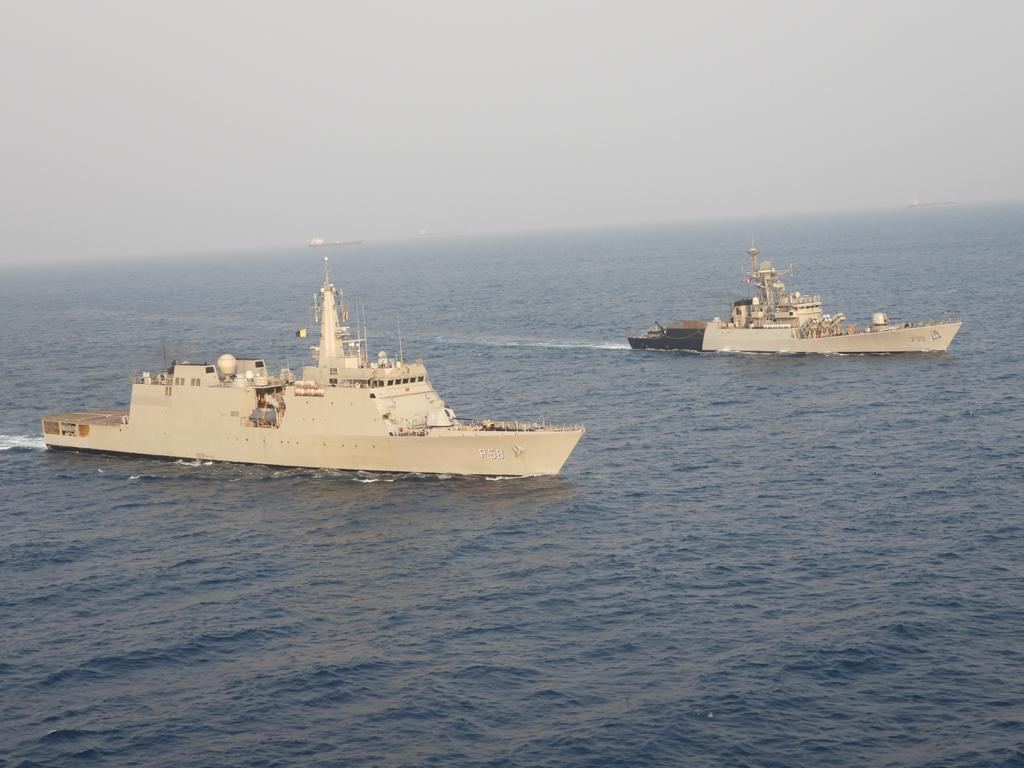
INS Sumedha (P58) and Kulish (P63) en route to Bangladesh.

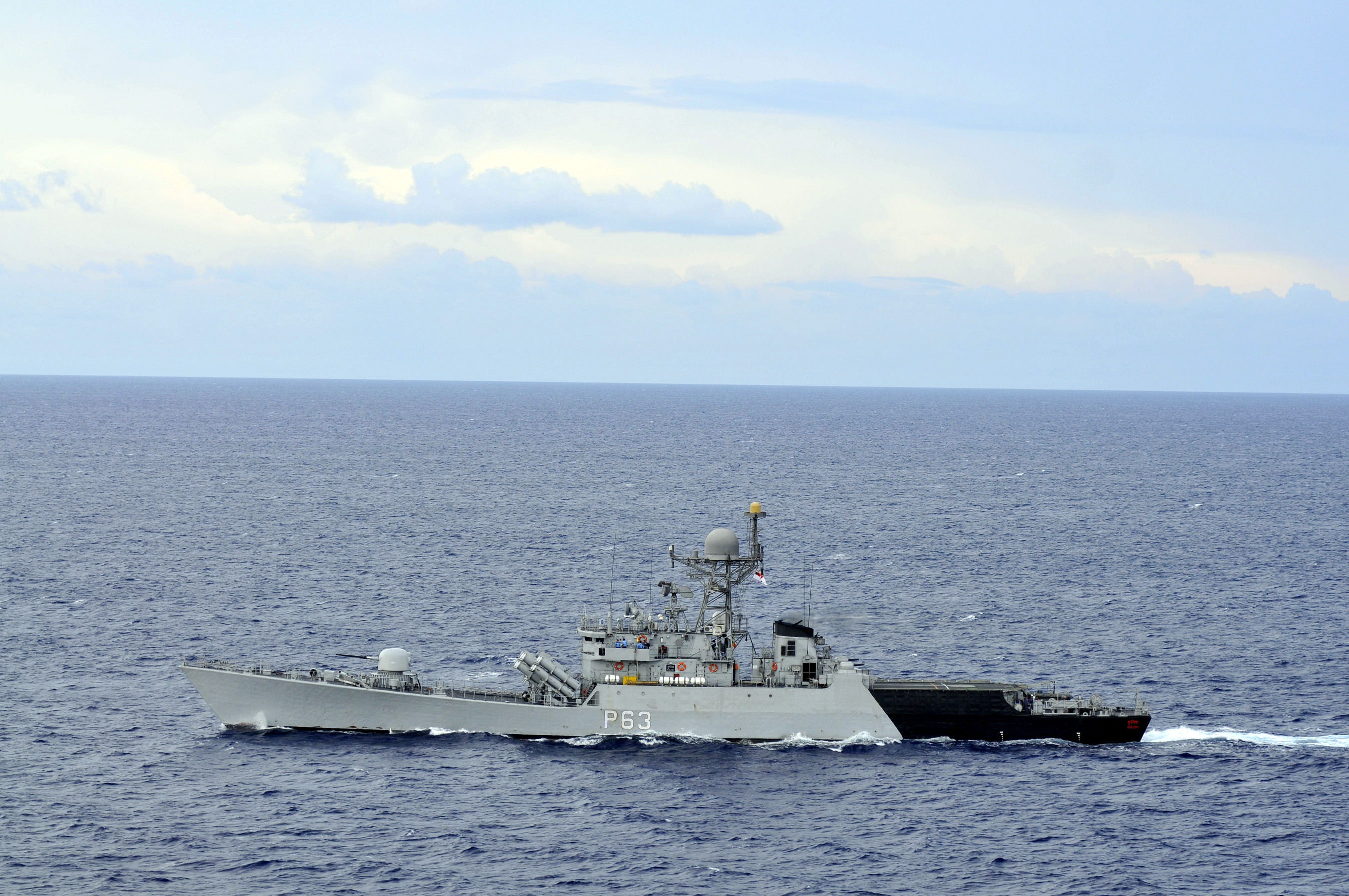
Kulish at sea.

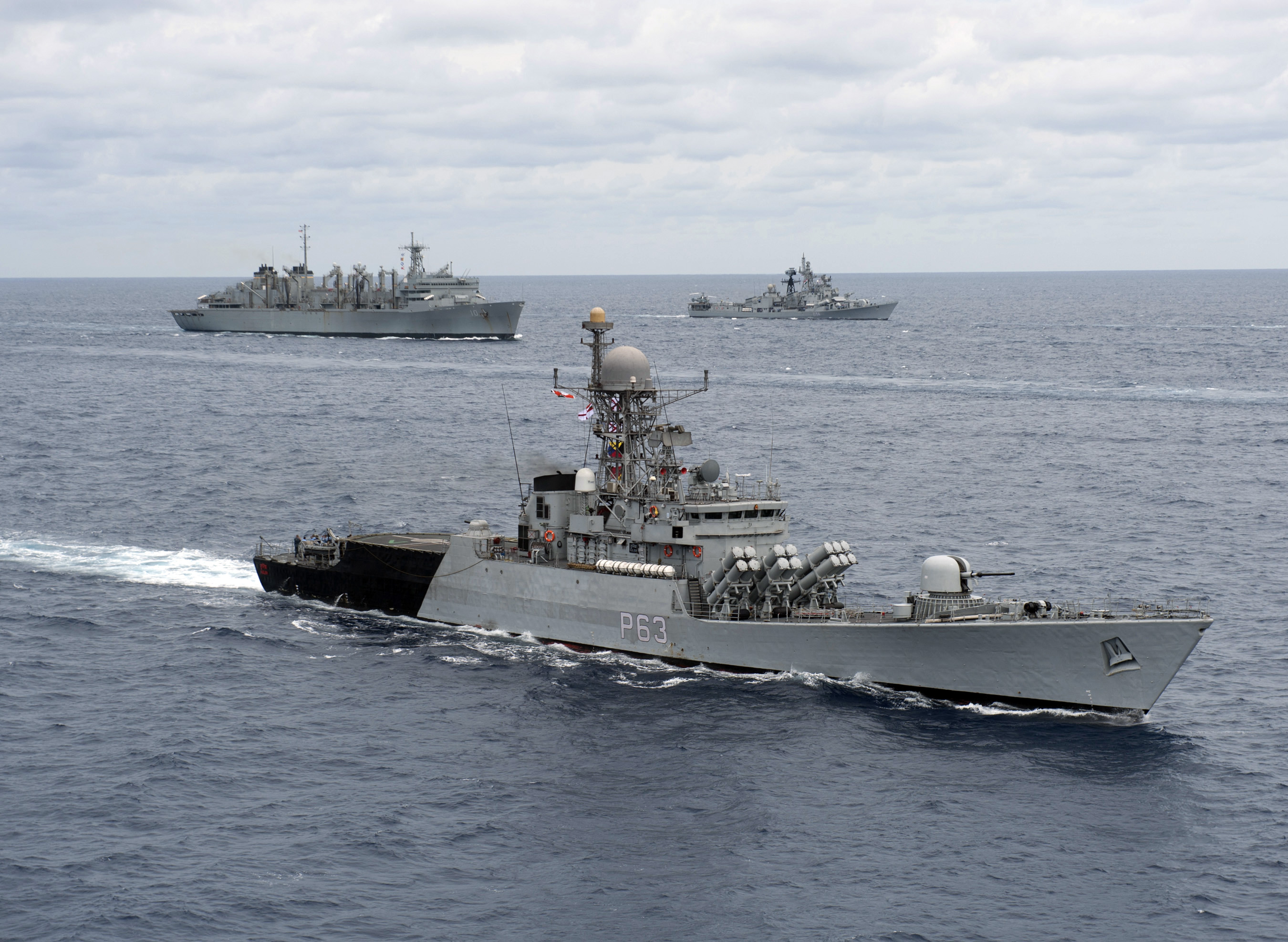
Kulish underway with U.S Navy during Exercise Malabar 2012.

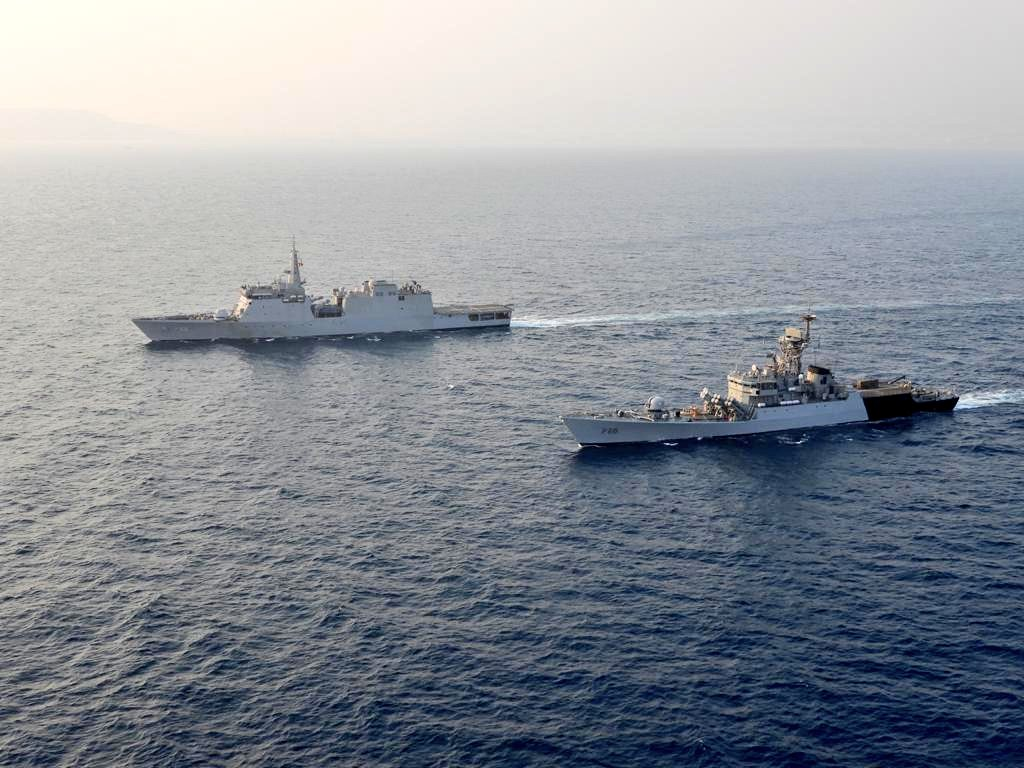
INS Kulish and INS Sumedha enroute to Bangladesh.
