= INS Kora =

Indian Navy corvette

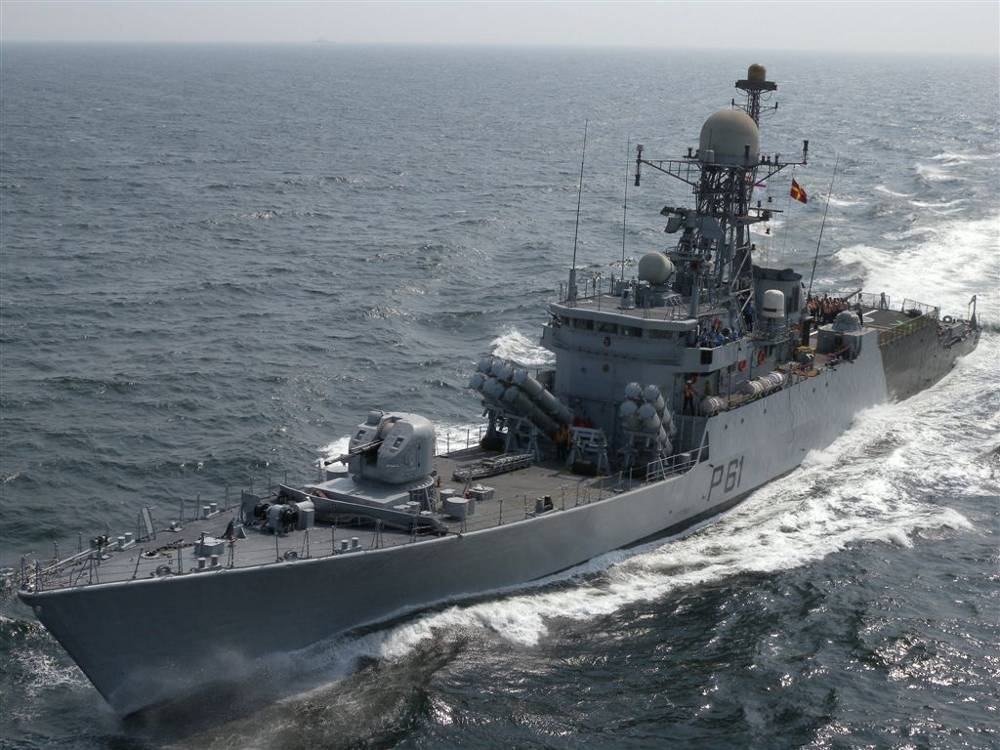
- INS Kora entering Trincomalee, Sri Lanka

History

India
- Name: INS Kora
- Namesake: "Sword"
- Builder: Garden Reach Shipbuilders and Engineers
- Laid down: 10 January 1990
- Launched: 23 September 1992
- Commissioned: 10 August 1998
- Identification: Pennant number: P61
- Status: Active

General characteristics
- Class & type: Kora-class corvette
- Displacement: 1,400 tons full load
- Length: 91.1 m (298 ft 11 in)
- Beam: 10.5 m (34 ft 5 in)
- Draught: 4.5 m (14 ft 9 in)
- Propulsion: 2 diesel motors with 14,400 hp (10,700 kW); 2 shafts
- Speed: 25 knots (46 km/h)
- Range: 4,000 mi (6,400 km) at 16 knots (30 km/h)
- Complement: 134 (incl 14 officers)
- Sensors & processing systems: 1 × MR 352 Pozitiv-E radar; Bharat 1245 navigation radar; Bharat Vympel IPN-10 combat data system
- Armament: 16 × Kh-35 Uran-E SSM; 2 × Strela-2M (SA-N-5) SAM; 1 × 76.2 mm AK–176M gun; 2 × 30 mm AK-630 guns
- Aircraft carried: 1 HAL Chetak or HAL Dhruv helicopter

INS Kora is the lead ship of the Kora-class of 1,350-tonne guided missile corvettes in active service with the Indian Navy. The vessel was built at Garden Reach Shipbuilders and Engineers (GRSE) and outfitted at Mazagon Dock Limited (MDL).

She is equipped with 3M-24 anti-ship missiles as a primary weapon, with two Strela-2M anti-air missiles as defensive weapons.

== History ==
Kora was on a goodwill visit to Singapore in 2001.

On 31 October 2014, Kora was in collision with the cargo ship MV Madeleine Rickmers in the Bay of Bengal off the coast of Vishakhapatnam. Kora participated in the 2015 SLINEX training exercises from 27 October to 1 November. Kora took part in LIMA in 2017.

The ship has taken part extensively in various exercises in the South China Sea. She and INS Ranvijay, a Rajput-class destroyer, participated in bilateral exercises with Vietnam Navy and Philippine Navy in 2021. A frigate from the Philippines, BRP Antonio Luna took part in the exercise.

Kora along with INS Khanjar was on a visit to Kolkata between 28 and 30 November 2025 as part of the Navy Week celebrations. The ships were open for public visitors.
