= INS Kirch =

Indian corvette

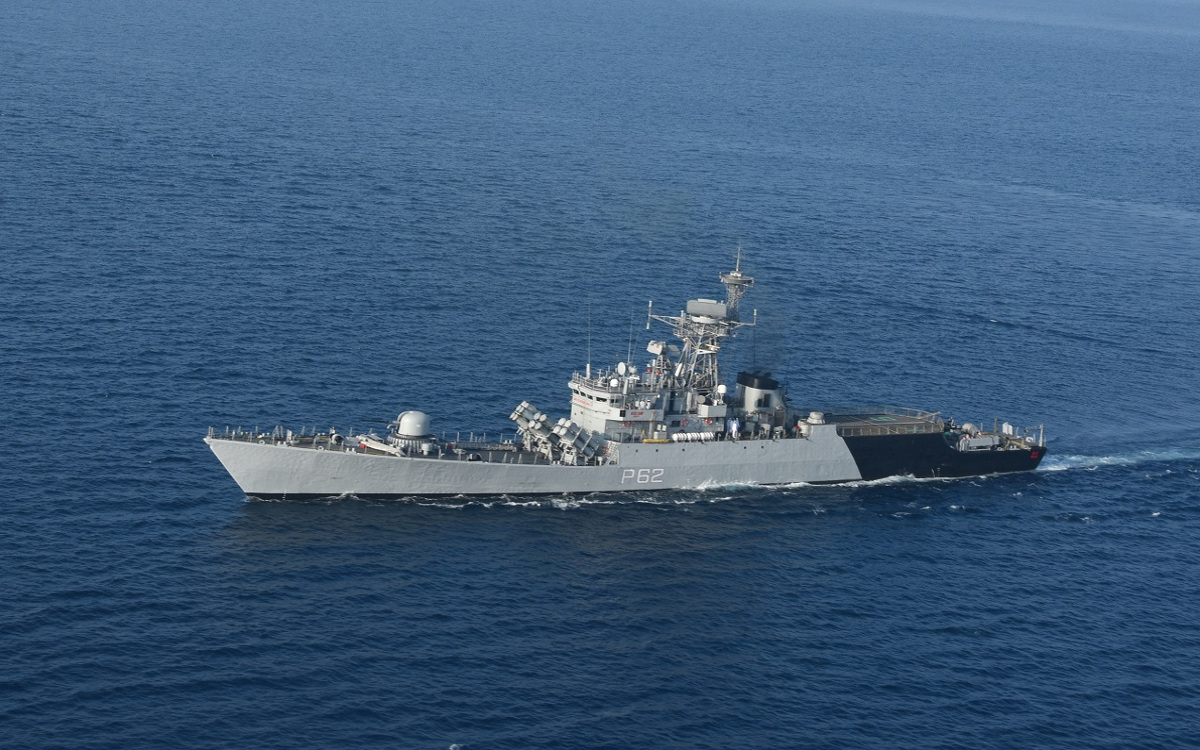
- INS Kirch during Milan Exercise

History

India
- Name: INS Kirch
- Namesake: "Sword"
- Builder: Garden Reach Shipbuilders & Engineers, Mazagon Dock Limited
- Laid down: 31 January 1992
- Launched: 5 October 1995
- Commissioned: 22 January 2001
- Identification: Pennant number: P62
- Status: Active

General characteristics
- Class & type: Kora-class corvette
- Displacement: 1,400 tons full load
- Length: 91.1 m (299 ft)
- Beam: 10.5 m (34 ft)
- Draught: 4.5 m (15 ft)
- Propulsion: 2 diesel motors with 14,400 hp; 2 shafts
- Speed: 25 knots (46 km/h)
- Range: 4,000 mi (6,400 km) at 16 knots (30 km/h)
- Complement: 134 (incl 14 officers)
- Sensors & processing systems: 1 × MR 352 Pozitiv-E radar; Bharat 1245 navigation radar; Bharat Vympel IPN-10 combat data system
- Armament: 16 × Kh-35 Uran-E SSM; 2 × Strela-2M (SA-N-5) SAM; 1 × 76.2mm OTO-Melara SRGM gun; 2 × 30mm AK-630 guns
- Aircraft carried: 1 HAL Chetak or HAL Dhruv helicopter

INS Kirch is a Kora-class corvette, currently in active service with the Indian Navy.

== Service history ==
In early 2011, the ship was part of a fleet of warships from the Eastern Fleet which went on an operational deployment in South East Asia and the Western Pacific. The flotilla was composed of the INS Delhi, INS Ranvijay, INS Ranvir, INS Jyoti and INS Kirch, and carried 1,400 naval personnel on board. They were commanded by Rear Admiral Harish Chandra Singh Bisht. The flotilla, along with an Indian Navy maritime reconnaissance aircraft took part in a five-day exercise SIMBEX 2011 with the Singapore Navy in the South China Sea. Four naval ships including a submarine of the Singapore Navy were commanded by Rear Admiral Joseph Leong, Fleet Commander of the Republic of Singapore Navy. The Indian fleet then proceeded on its forward deployment, and made port calls at Alava pier in Subic Bay (Philippines), Vlapostok (Russia), Manila (Philippines), Ho Chi Minh City (Vietnam), Bandar Seri Begawan (Brunei), Kota Kina Balu (Malaysia) and Jakarta (Indonesia). The ships also visited China, Japan and South Korea. After exercising with the U.S. Navy, the fleet conducted drills at Vladivostok with the Russian Navy's Pacific Fleet. This was the second time the Indian Navy had made a port call at Vladivostok. She also participated at the International Fleet Review 2026 held at Visakapatanam.
