= INS Ranvir =

Rajput-class destroyer built for the Indian Navy

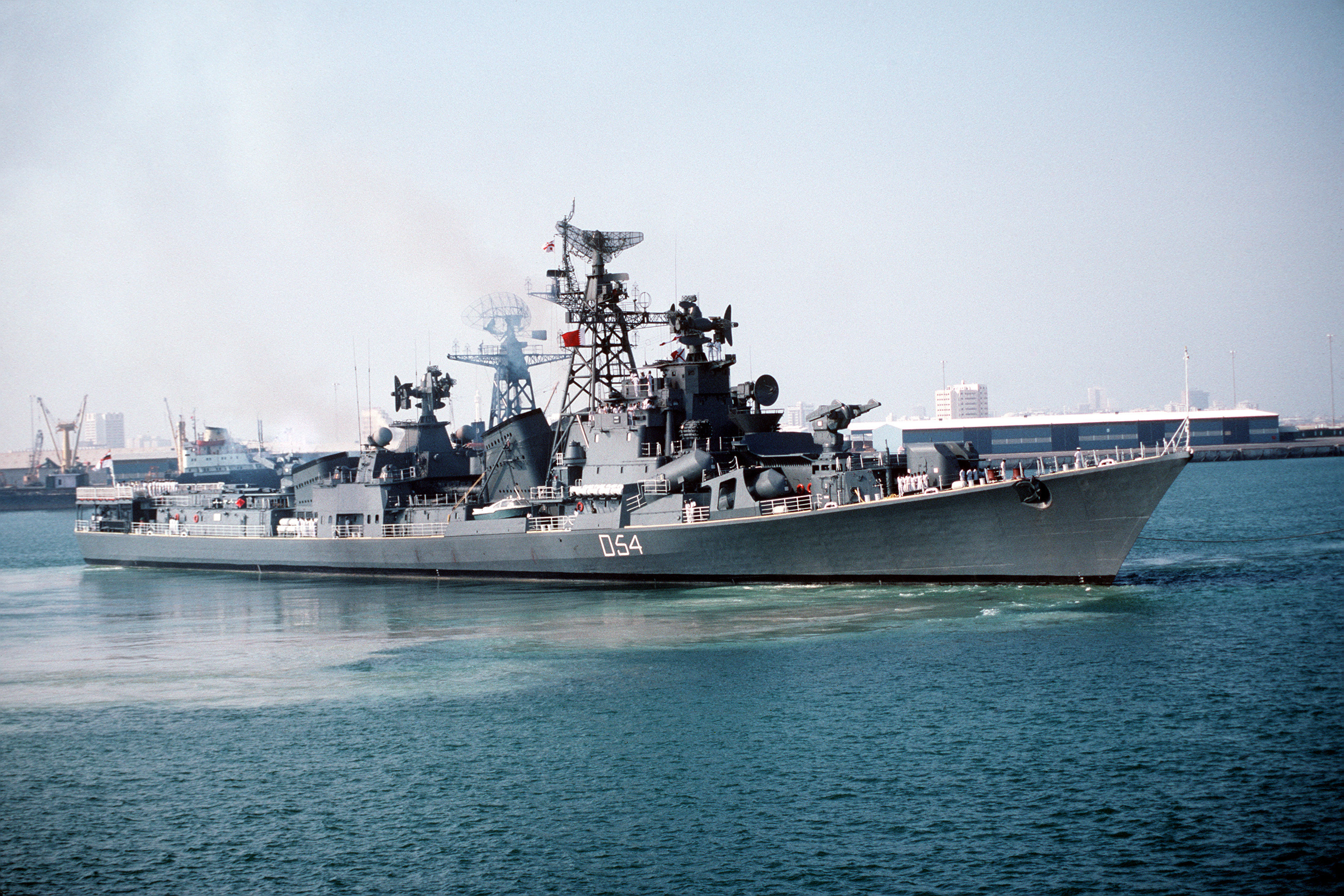
- INS Ranvir

History

India
- Name: Ranvir
- Builder: 61 Kommunara Shipbuilding Plant
- Launched: 12 March 1983
- Commissioned: 28 October 1986
- Identification: Pennant number: D54
- Status: in active service
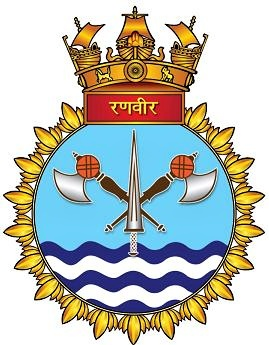
- Badge

General characteristics
- Class & type: Rajput-class destroyer
- Displacement: 3,950 tons standard, 4,974 tons full load
- Length: 147 m (482 ft)
- Beam: 15.8 m (52 ft)
- Draught: 5 m (16 ft)
- Propulsion: 4 × gas turbine engines; 2 shafts, 72,000 hp (54,000 kW)
- Speed: 35 knots (65 km/h)
- Range: 4,000 mi (6,400 km) at 18 knots (33 km/h); 2,600 miles (4,200 km) at 30 knots (56 km/h)
- Complement: 320 (including 35 officers)
- Sensors & processing systems: Air/Surface: EL/M-2238 STAR (replacing MR-310U Angara (NATO: Head Net-C) radar at E-band); Air: Bharat RAWL (Dutch Signaal LW08) radar at D-band.(replacing MP-500 Kliver (NATO: Big Net-A) radar at C-band ); Navigation: 2 × Volga (NATO: Don Kay) radar at I-band frequency, Communication: Inmarsat, Sonar: Bharat HUMSA ( replaced hull mounted Vycheda MG-311 (NATO: Wolf Paw) during MLR), 1 × Vyega MG-325 (NATO: Mare Tail) variable depth sonar
- Armament: Anti-surface: 8 × BrahMos supersonic missiles in aft VLS (replaced aft S-125 SAM launcher); 4 × SS-N-2D Styx AShM missiles in inclined launchers; Air-defence: 2 × Barak SAM 8 cell launchers (port and starboard); 1 × S-125M (NATO: SA-N-1) SAM launcher (Removed by early 2025); Guns: 1 x OTO Melara 76 mm naval gun (replaced AK-726 twin 3" naval gun); 2 × 30 mm (1.2 in) AK-630M CIWS; Anti-submarine: 1 × 533 mm (21 in) PTA 533 quintuple torpedo tube launcher, 2 × RBU-6000 anti-submarine rocket launcher.
- Aircraft carried: 1 × Ka-28 helicopter

INS Ranvir (lit. 'Hero in Battle') is the fourth of the five Rajput-class destroyers built for the Indian Navy. Ranvir was commissioned on 28 October 1986.

== Service history ==
=== 2008 ===
INS Ranvir along with INS Mysore were anchored just outside Sri Lankan territorial waters to provide security for the Indian Prime Minister Dr Manmohan Singh, and other high-ranking officials at the 15th SAARC summit.

=== 2010 ===
INS Ranvir was used as a staging platform to test the BrahMos Supersonic cruise missile. On March 21, 2010, She fired one during tests against the decommissioned INS Meen.

=== 2015 ===
On 22–26 May 2015, INS Ranvir with INS Shakti visited Singapore. On 31 May - 4 June 2015, INS Ranvir with INS Shakti made a port call at Jakarta, Indonesia. She was commanded by Captain Jaswinder Singh.

=== 2022 ===
On 18 January 2022, there was an explosion in an internal compartment of the ship at the naval dockyard in Mumbai, resulting in three deaths and eleven injuries. Minor structural damage was also reported. The blast was attributed to Freon gas leak in the AC compartment under the junior sailors’ dining hall. Krishan Kumar MCPO I, Surinder Kumar MCPO II and A.K. Singh MCPO II were killed in the incident. An investigation revealed that an incompatible type of refrigerant (R125) supplied by a private firm was used instead of the standard naval (R22). The firm was booked by the Navy.

=== 2024 ===
INS Ranvir reached Chattogram, Bangladesh as a part of Operational Deployment on 29 June 2024. After the completion of the harbour phase, the ship will participate in a Maritime Partnership Exercise with the Bangladesh Navy.

=== 2025 ===
INS Ranvir participated in Exercise Bongosagar 2025 and Coordinated Patrol with the BNS Abu Ubaidah of the Bangladesh Navy in March 2025.

On 26 November, the ship along with INS Satpura, INS Himgiri and INS Udaygiri visited the Port of Chennai as part of the year's Navy Day Celebrations. The visit saw the participation of over 930 students, 375 NCC cadets as well as 364 officer cadets from Officers Training Academy, Chennai.

=== 2026 ===
INS Ranvir participated at the International Fleet Review 2026 held at Visakapatanam.

In October 2026, the Ministry of Defence signed a contract to refit two Rajput-class destroyers and two Veer-class corvettes with BrahMos launchers and fire-control systems. INS Ranvir is one of the likely recipients, replacing the Styx inclined launchers in the bow.

== In popular culture ==
INS Ranvir was featured in Bollywood film Ab Tumhare Hawale Watan Sathiyo starring Amitabh Bachan and Bobby Deol who played the role of Commanding Officer onboard INS Ranvir. Kora-class corvettes, INS Kirch and INS Kulish were also featured alongside it.
