= INS Karmuk =

Kora class corvette

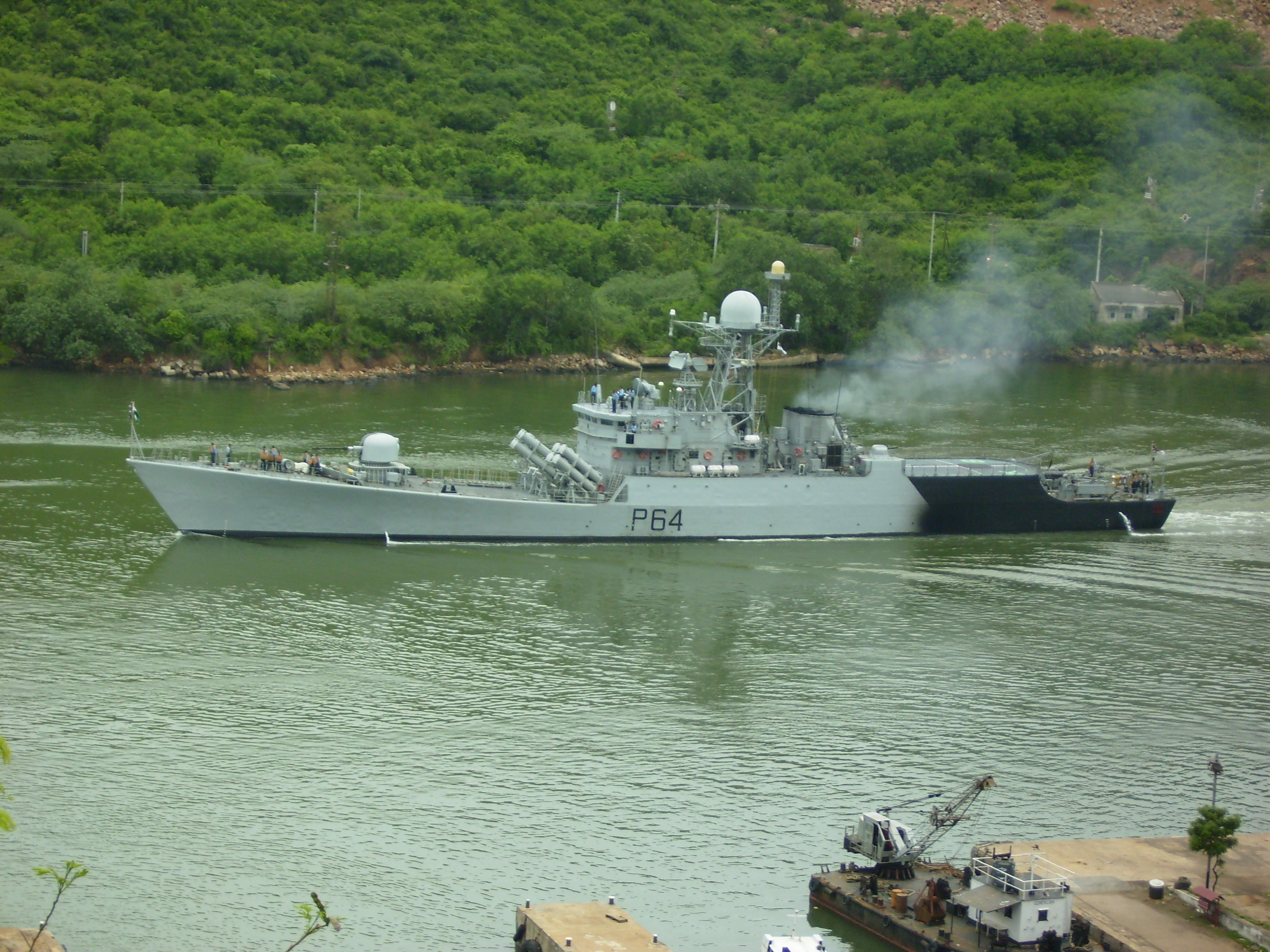
- INS Karmuk (P64) at Visakhapatnam. P.Suresh.

History

India
- Name: INS Karmuk
- Namesake: Mythological weapon
- Builder: Garden Reach Shipbuilders and Engineers
- Laid down: 27 August 1997
- Launched: April 2001
- Commissioned: 4 February 2004
- Identification: IMO number: 4558108; Pennant number: P64
- Status: Active

General characteristics
- Class & type: Kora-class corvette
- Displacement: 1,400 tons full load
- Length: 91.1 m (299 ft)
- Beam: 10.5 m (34 ft)
- Draught: 4.5 m (15 ft)
- Propulsion: 2 diesel motors with 14,400 hp; 2 shafts
- Speed: 25 knots (46 km/h)
- Range: 4,000 mi (6,400 km) at 16 knots (30 km/h)
- Complement: 134 (incl 14 officers)
- Sensors & processing systems: 1 × MR 352 Pozitiv-E radar; Bharat 1245 navigation radar; Bharat Vympel IPN-10 combat data system
- Armament: 16 × Kh-35 Uran-E SSM; 2 × Strela-2M (SA-N-5) SAM; 1 × 76.2mm AK–176 gun; 2 × 30mm AK-630 guns
- Aircraft carried: 1 HAL Chetak or HAL Dhruv helicopter

INS Karmuk is a Kora-class corvette, currently in active service with the Indian Navy.

== Service history ==
=== South China Sea and the North West Pacific ===
The ships, as part of a battle group of 4 ships began a sustained operational deployment to the South China Sea and the North West Pacific Ocean. The other three ships were the INS Rana, a Rajput class guided missile destroyer, INS Shivalik, a stealth frigate, and INS Shakti, a Deepak-class fleet tanker. This battle group was under the command of Rear Admiral P Ajit Kumar, Flag Officer Commanding, Eastern Fleet. According to the Ministry of Defence, the two-month deployment, far from India's usual area of operations, along with naval exercises with a number of countries, aimed to demonstrate the Indian navy's operational reach.

During the deployment the battle group participated in passage exercises with the navies of the countries visited. The 'Passage Exercises' focussed on maritime security cooperation, which included humanitarian aid & disaster relief (HADR) operations and 'visit, board, search and seizure' (VBSS) drills for anti-piracy operations. These exercises aimed to increase naval inter-operability, enabling the two navies to function together smoothly during possible HADR operations. In addition, during the port visits, the Fleet Commander along with the commanding officers of the ships met high-ranking officials of the Navy, state administration, port management, coastal security organization, police, and other stakeholders of maritime security in the countries visited, to share professional experiences and exchange best practices in areas of mutual interest.

=== JIMEX 2012 ===
The ship was deployed in the North West Pacific for JIMEX 2012 (Japan-India Maritime Exercise) with the four ship group, and took part in India's first bi-lateral maritime exercise with Japan. The Japanese Maritime Self Defence Force (JMSDF) was represented by two destroyers, one maritime patrol aircraft and a helicopter.

The four ships entered Tokyo on 5 June 12 after visiting Singapore, Vietnam, Philippines and Republic of Korea. They stayed in Tokyo for 3 days. This visit coincides with commemoration of 60 years of diplomatic relations between India and Japan. Vice Admiral Anil Chopra, Flag Officer Commanding-in-Chief Eastern Naval Command also visited Tokyo to witness the first JIMEX.

=== Southeast Asia ===
After the deployment in the North pacific, the battle group was deployed in the South China Sea. As part of India's Look East policy, the ships visited the Shanghai port on 13 June 2012, for a five-day goodwill tour. INS Shakti served as the fuel and logistics tanker to the three destroyers. The ships left the port on 17 June 2012. Before leaving the port, the ships conducted routine passage exercise with the People's Liberation Army Navy.

After the visits to Singapore, Vietnam, Philippines, Japan, South Korea and China, the ships visited Port Klang, Malaysia. This was the last port call of the battle group, after which it returned to the Eastern Fleet of the Indian Navy, after being on a two-month-long deployment which started in May 2012.
