= USS Halsey (DDG-97) =

American naval ship

- USS Halsey at Pearl Harbor on 14 February 2013

History

United States
- Name: Halsey
- Namesake: William Halsey, Jr.
- Ordered: 6 March 1998
- Builder: Ingalls Shipbuilding, Mississippi
- Laid down: 13 January 2002
- Launched: 9 January 2004
- Commissioned: 30 July 2005
- Home port: Naval Station San Diego
- Identification: MMSI number: 369970407; Callsign: NBUL; Hull number: DDG-97
- Motto: Hit Hard Hit Fast Hit Often
- Honours and awards: See Awards
- Status: in active service
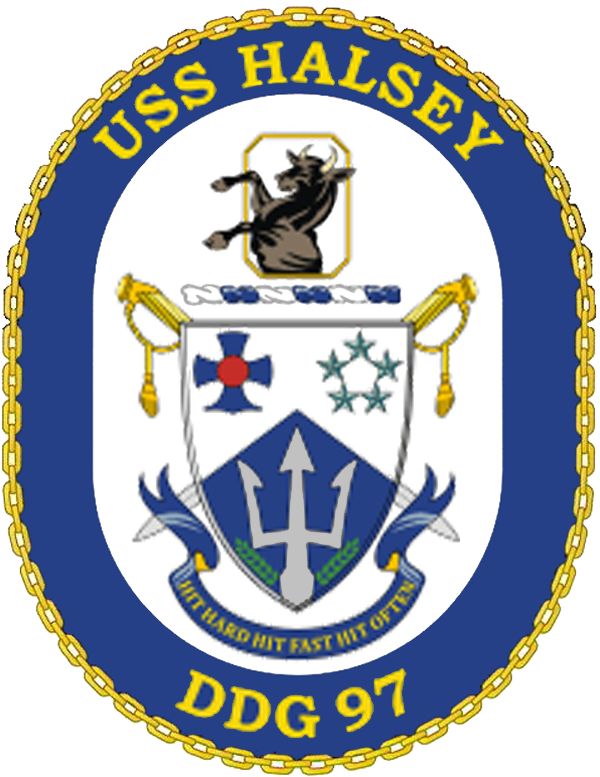
- Badge

General characteristics
- Class & type: Arleigh Burke-class destroyer
- Displacement: 9,300 tons
- Length: 509 ft 6 in (155.30 m)
- Beam: 66 ft (20 m)
- Draft: 31 ft (9.4 m)
- Propulsion: 4 × General Electric LM2500-30 gas turbines, 2 shafts, 100,000 shp (75 MW)
- Speed: 30+ knots (55+ km/h)
- Complement: 257 officers and enlisted
- Electronic warfare & decoys: AN/SLQ-32 electronic warfare suite; AN/SLQ-25 Nixie torpedo countermeasures; Mk 36 Mod 12 decoy launching systems; Mk 53 Nulka decoy launching systems; Mk 59 decoy launching systems
- Armament: Guns: 1 × 5-inch (127 mm)/62 Mk 45 Mod 4 (lightweight gun); 1 × 20 mm (0.8 in) Phalanx CIWS; 2 × 25 mm (0.98 in) Mk 38 machine gun system; 4 × 0.50 in (12.7 mm) caliber guns; Missiles: 1 × 32-cell, 1 × 64-cell (96 total cells) Mk 41 vertical launching system (VLS): RIM-66M surface-to-air missile; RIM-156 surface-to-air missile; RIM-174A Standard ERAM; RIM-161 anti-ballistic missile; RIM-162 ESSM (quad-packed); BGM-109 Tomahawk cruise missile; RUM-139 vertical launch ASROC; Torpedoes: 2 × Mark 32 triple torpedo tubes: Mark 46 lightweight torpedo; Mark 50 lightweight torpedo; Mark 54 lightweight torpedo
- Aircraft carried: 2 × MH-60R Seahawk helicopters

USS Halsey (DDG-97) is an Arleigh Burke-class (Flight IIA) Aegis guided missile destroyer in the United States Navy. She is the second ship to be named after Fleet Admiral William Halsey Jr.

== Construction ==
Built in Pascagoula, Mississippi, the ship and crew were completely certified and "surge ready" 17 January 2006, nearly a year faster than previous DDGs.

== Operational history ==
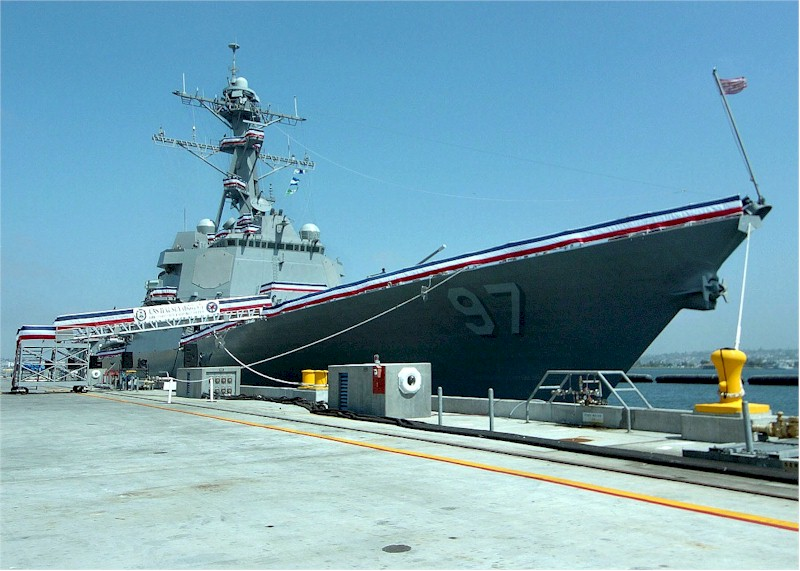
USS Halsey at her commissioning ceremony in 2005.

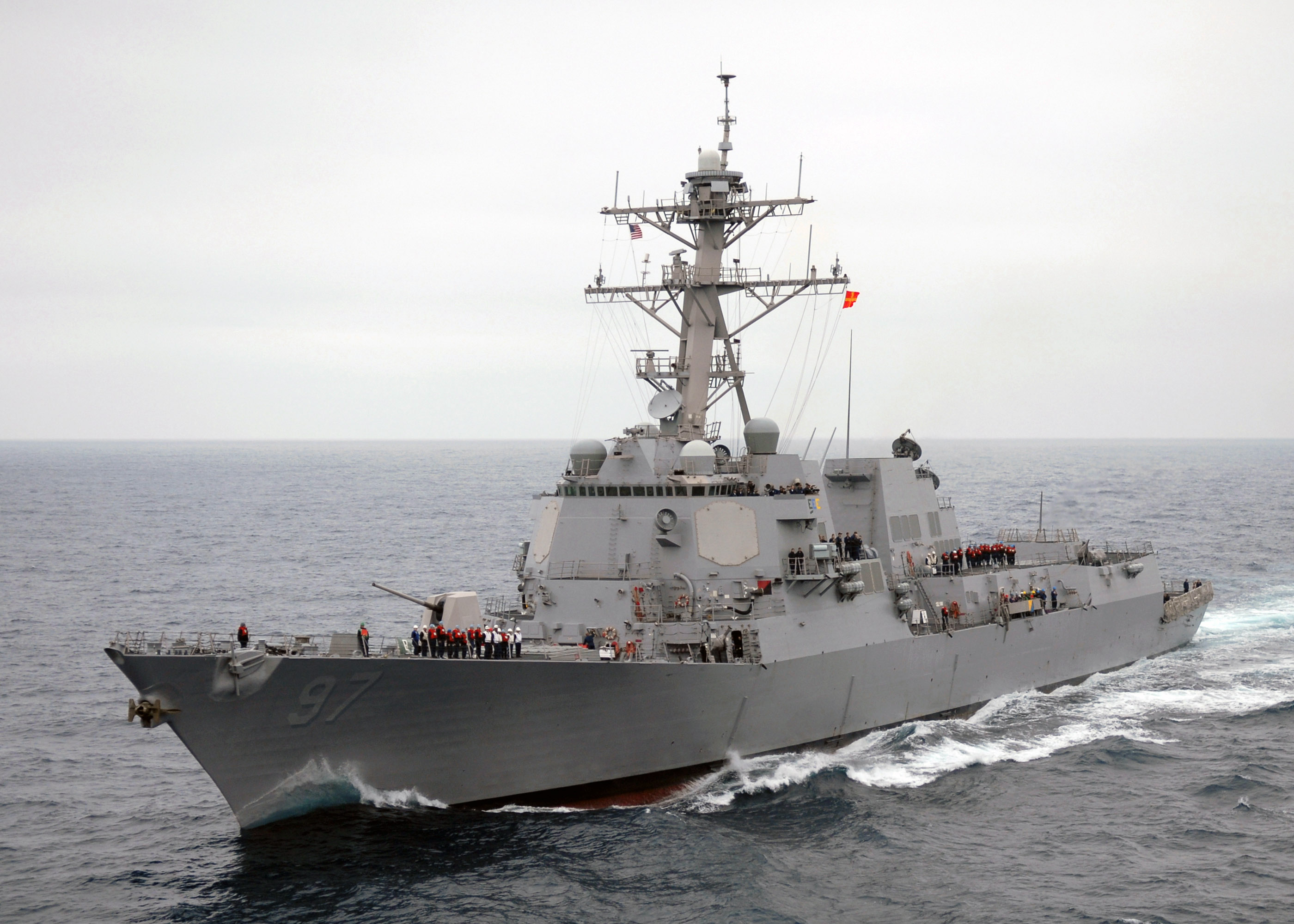
USS Halsey transiting through the Pacific Ocean in August 2007.

Halsey departed for her maiden deployment 6 August 2006 under her second commanding officer, Commander Pinckney. 2 November 2006 Halsey visited Kagoshima, Japan. That night, after a party for visiting local Japanese dignitaries, during which on-duty crew were drinking, there was a fire which damaged one of the main reduction gears. Halsey returned 24 December 2006, having worked with the Kitty Hawk Carrier Strike Group and taking part in ANNUALEX.

An incomplete report was filed and months later another fire and explosion brought to light the extent of the first fire. The ship's commander was relieved and the damage to the ship was $8.5 million. Commander Paul J. Schlise took command of Halsey March 2007.

Commander Robert Beauchamp took command of Halsey on 17 August 2008.

Halsey departed Naval Base San Diego for her second deployment on 4 May 2008 for a deployment to the Persian Gulf. After six months and numerous port visits Halsey returned home to San Diego on 3 November 2008.

Halsey, homeported in San Diego, was part of USS Peleliu Expeditionary Strike Group assigned to deploy to the U.S. 5th Fleet area of operations to conduct maritime security operations (MSO). MSO help develop security in the maritime environment, which promotes stability and global prosperity. These operations complement the counterterrorism and security efforts of regional nations and seek to disrupt violent extremists' use of the maritime environment as a venue for attack or to transport personnel, weapons or other material.

On 25 January 2013 Halsey performed a hull swap with USS Russell and arrived at her new homeport, Joint Base Pearl Harbor–Hickam on 14 February 2013.

=== Awards ===
- Navy Unit Commendation - (Sep 2010-Mar 2011)
- Navy Meritorious Unit Commendation - (Nov 2011-May 2012)
- Navy E Ribbon - (2011)

== Namesake ==
Halsey is named in honor of Fleet Admiral William Frederick "Bull" Halsey Jr. Halsey was commissioned 30 July 2005 at Naval Air Station North Island, Coronado, California, under commanding officer Commander James L. Autrey.

== In popular culture ==
In the fall of 2012, USS Halsey served as a filming location for the TNT television series The Last Ship and its setting, USS Nathan James (DDG-151).
