= Malabar (naval exercise) =

Trilateral naval exercise

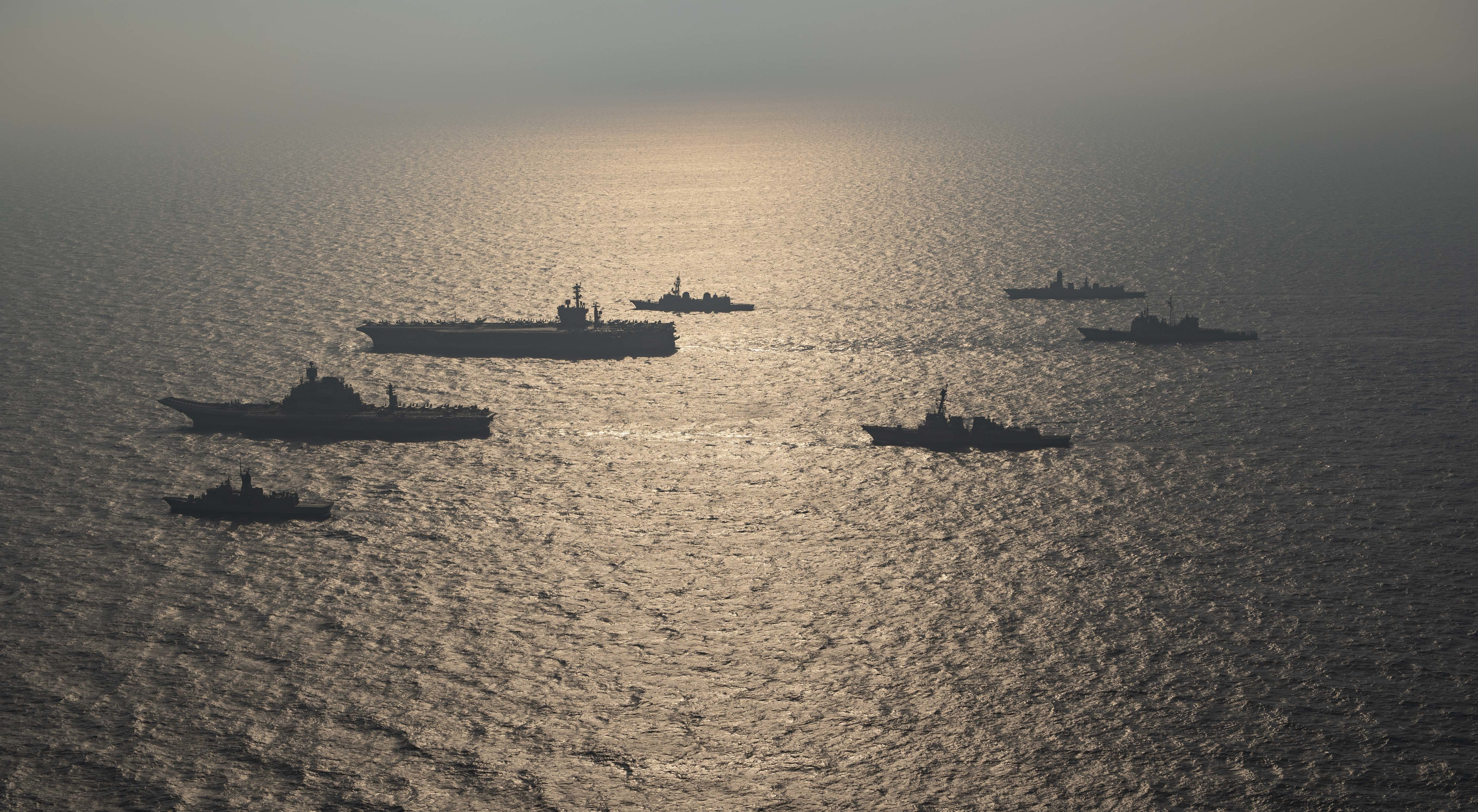
Ships from the Royal Australian Navy, Japan Maritime Self-Defense Force, Indian Navy and the United States Navy participate in Malabar 2020.

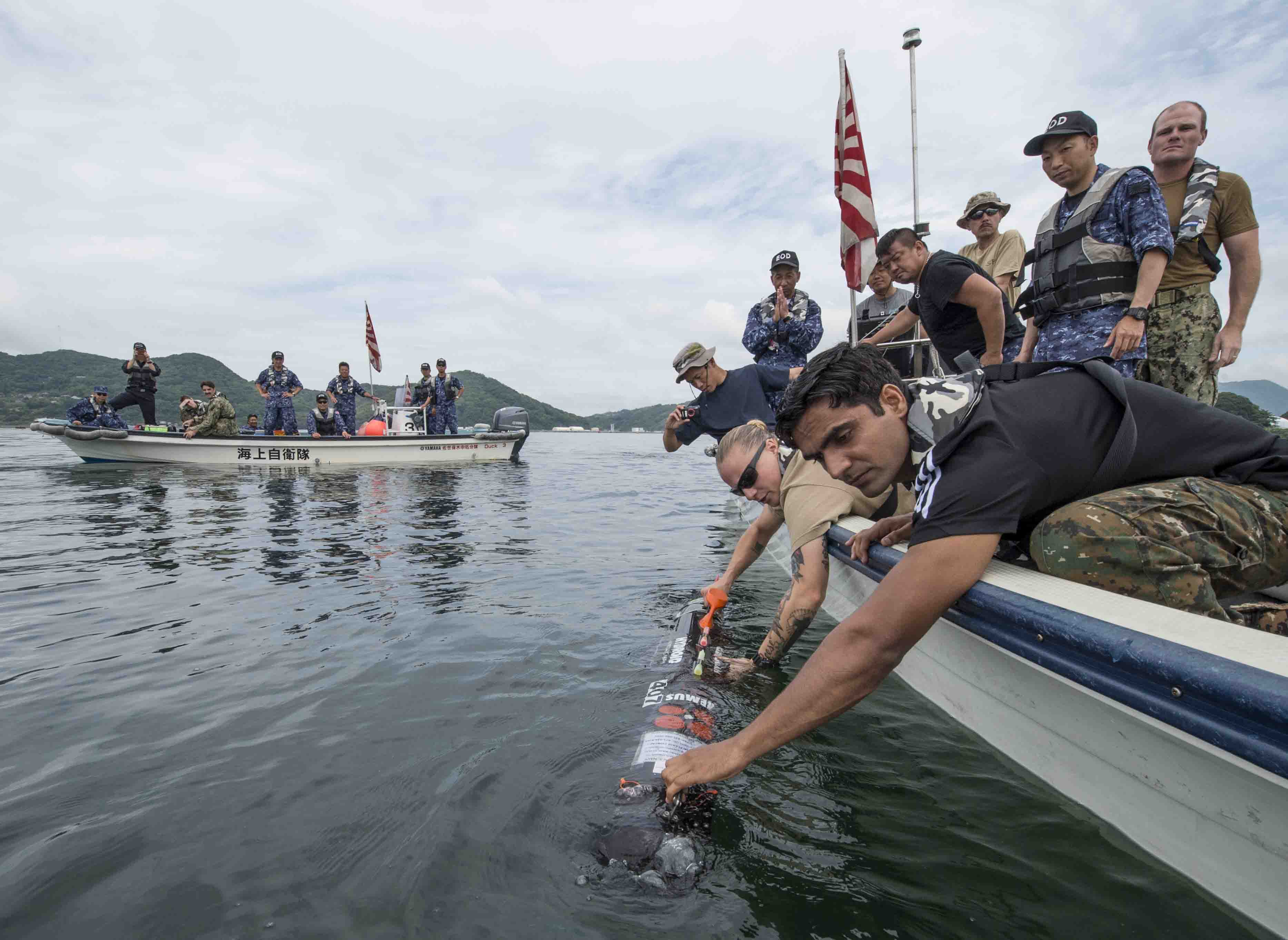
An Indian Navy Explosive Ordnance Disposal technician and a U.S. Navy Sailor launch an autonomous underwater vehicle, Malabar 2016.

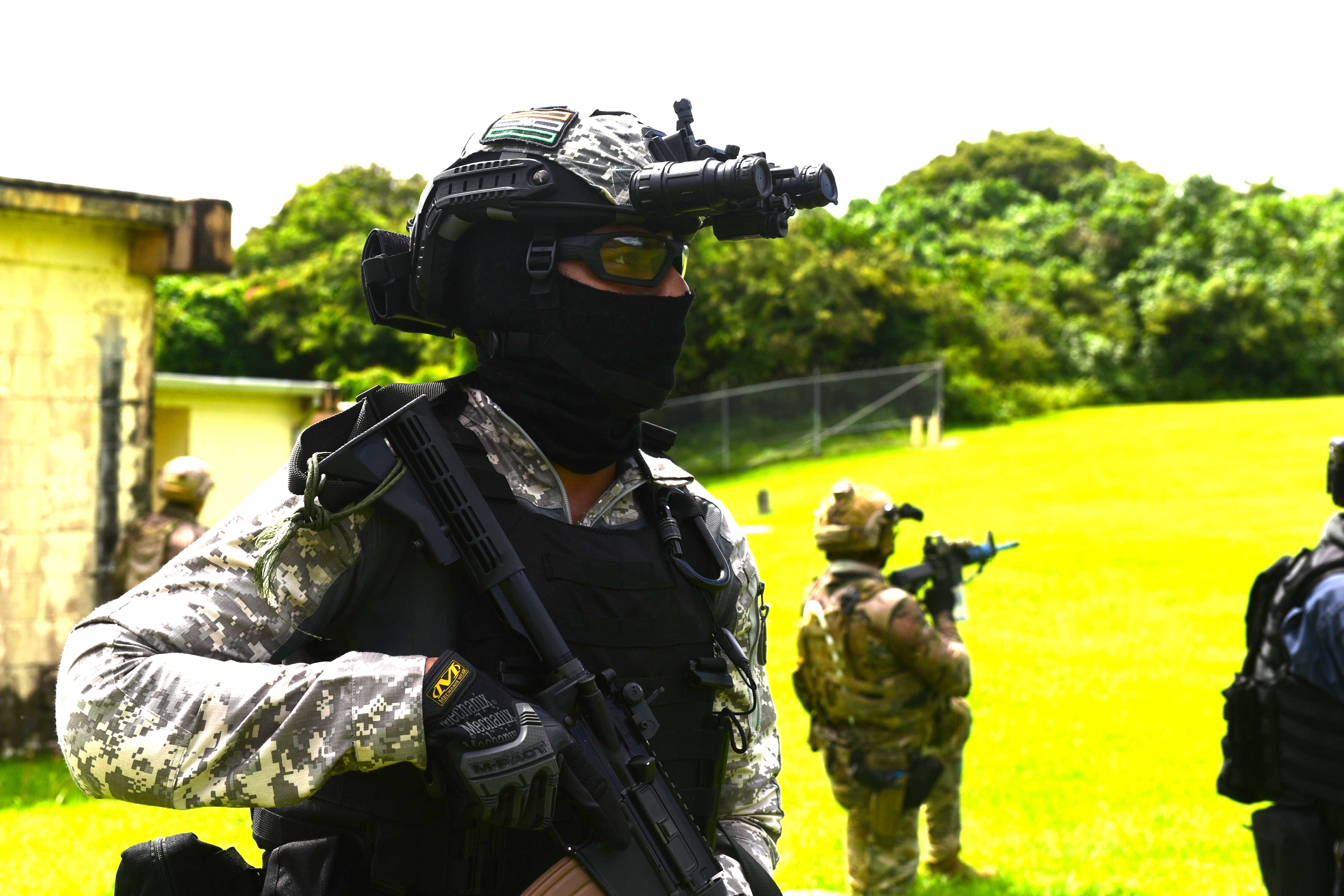
Urban combat training during Malabar 2021. MARCOS, US Navy SEALs and JMSDF special forces visible.

Exercise Malabar (Note: Named after the south-west Indian coast, Malabar Coast, where the first exercise was conducted. Map showing Malabar Coast) is a naval exercise involving India, the United States and Japan as permanent partners. Australia re-joined the exercise in 2020. The annual Malabar exercises includes diverse activities, ranging from fighter combat operations from aircraft carriers through maritime interdiction operations, anti-submarine warfare, diving salvage operations, amphibious operations, counter-piracy operations, cross–deck helicopter landings and anti–air warfare operations. Over the years, the exercise has been conducted in the Philippine Sea, off the coast of Japan, the Persian Gulf, in the Bay of Bengal and the Arabian Sea. It is conducted by the Asian and the North American Commands.

The exercise started in 1992 along the Malabar Coast as a bilateral exercise between India and the United States. It was expanded in 2007 with the participation of Japan, Singapore and Australia. Japan became a permanent partner in 2015. Since 2020, Australia participated in the exercise again, marking the second time that the Quad will be jointly participating in a military exercise. The aim of the exercise includes increasing interoperability between the naval forces.

The duration of the exercise has ranged from 1 to 11 sea-days. The complexity and sophistication of the exercise has increased over the years. Exercises have on-shore and at-sea stages. The average participation by India increased from 8 ships to just over 9 from 2002 to 2014.

Exercises have included aircraft carriers (USS Nimitz, Kitty Hawk, Ronald Reagan, George Washington, INS Vikramaditya, Viraat), helicopter carriers (JS Kaga, Izumo, Ise, Hyūga), frigates, submarines (diesel-electric and nuclear), destroyers, guided-missile vessels, cruisers, amphibious ships and auxiliary ships such as tankers. Coast guard vessels have also taken part. Aircraft have included the P3C Orion, Poseidon P8I, Tupolev Tu-142, Kawasaki P-1, ShinMaywa US-2, F/A 18 Super Hornets, Jaguars, Sea Harrier jets and Sea King helicopters. Special forces have also taken part.

== 1992–2002 ==
The first Malabar exercise between India and the United States was held on 28/29 May 1992. The exercises were located along the Malabar Coast in Cochin, headquarters of the Indian Southern Naval Command, and Goa. It was of an elementary level, including four vessels, passing exercises and basic maneuvers. Two more exercises were conducted before 1998, when the Americans suspended exercises after India tested nuclear weapons.

Edition	Year	Participants	Exercise Area	Vessels (Note: Other vessels such as tankers and various naval aircraft, including those attacked to aircraft carriers, also take part)	Exercises	Ref
1	1992	(India) (United States)	India's west coast	INS Gomati, INS Ranjit; USS Vandegrift, USS David R. Ray	Frequency sharing, basic maneuvers, search and rescue.	
2	1995	(India) (United States)	Persian Gulf			
3	1996	(India) (United States)	India's west coast			

== 2002–2007 ==
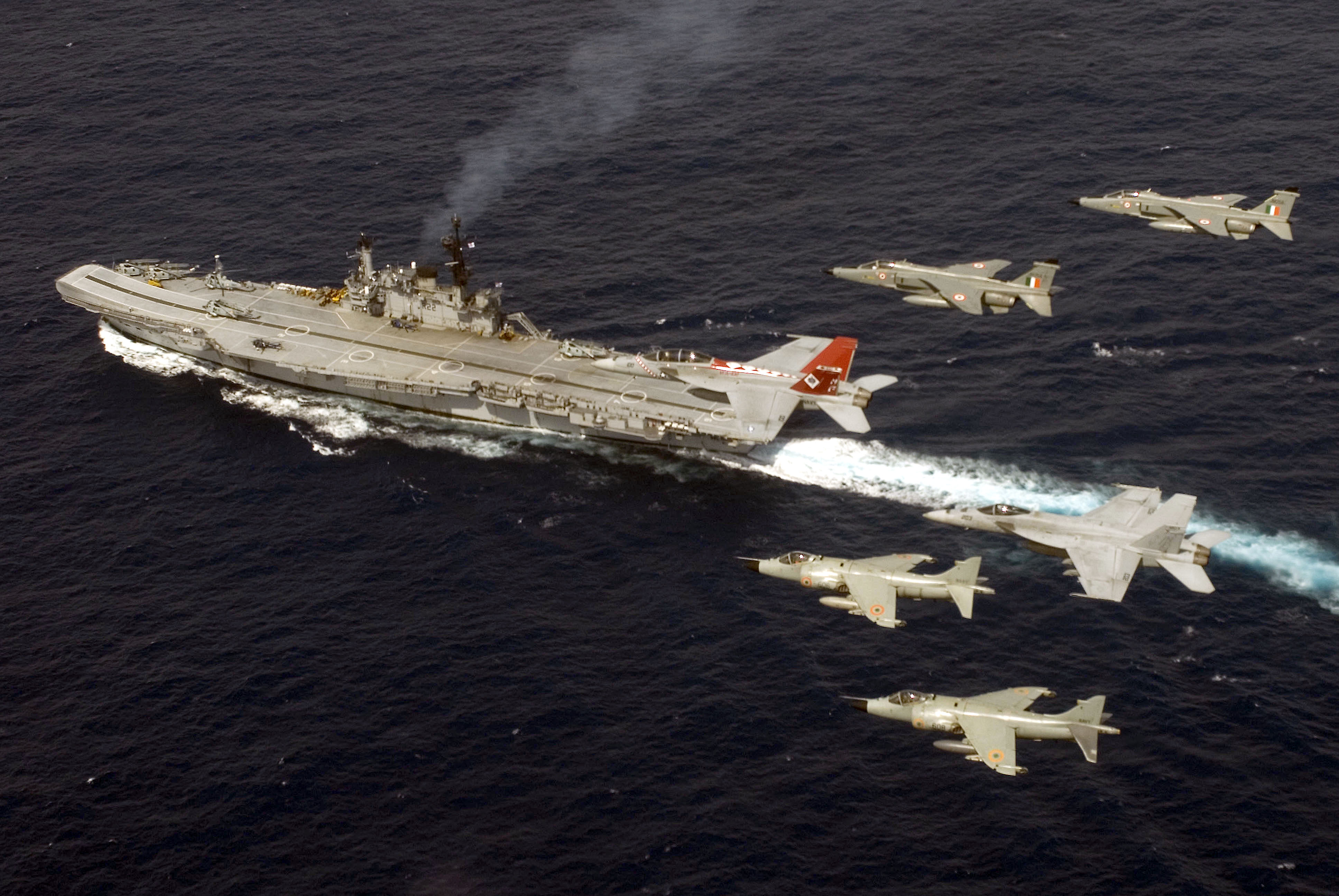
A pair of Indian Air Force Jaguars flying in formation beside a pair of Indian Navy Sea Harriers and a pair of U.S. Navy F/A-18 Super Hornets, flying over INS Viraat during Malabar 2007.

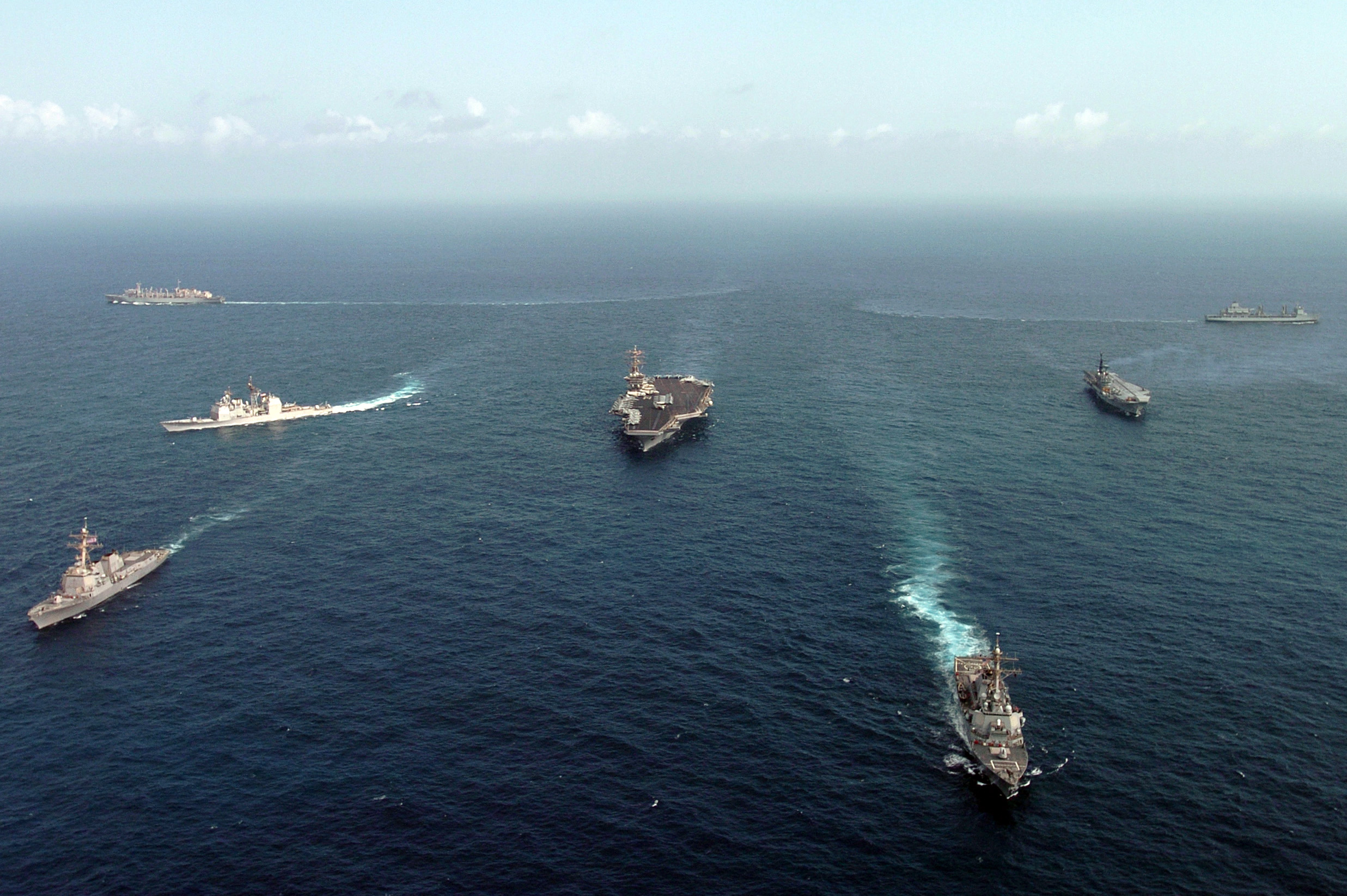
Ships assigned to the USS Nimitz Carrier Strike Group and the Indian aircraft carrier INS Viraat in formation as part of Malabar 2005.

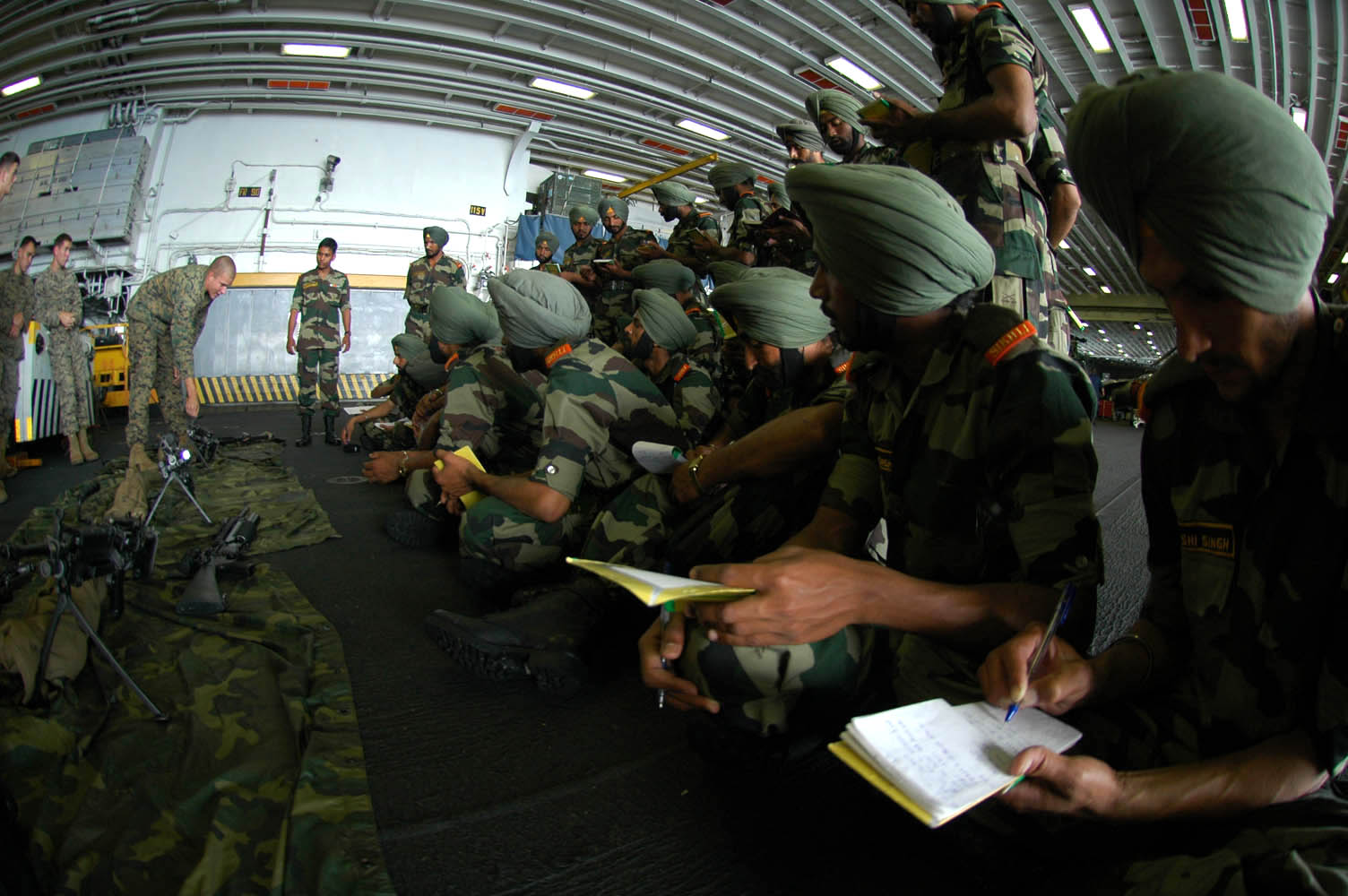
Indian soldiers assigned to the 9th Battalion of the Sikh Infantry take notes during small arms training aboard USS Boxer during Malabar 2006.

The United States renewed military contact following the 2001 September 11 attacks when India joined President George W Bush's campaign against international terrorism. The 2003 exercises featured sub-surface exercises for the first time. In 2005 India and US signed the New Framework for the India - U.S. Defence Relationship. Malabar 2005 saw the inclusion of aircraft carriers from both navies for the first time. 2006 was the first time expeditionary exercises took place with a United States Expeditionary Strike Group (ESG) leading the exercise. Malabar 2007 was the first time three aircraft carriers took part.

In 2007, the Quadrilateral Security Dialogue, an initiative between Japan, United States, Australia and India impacted the Malabar exercise. In 2007, for the first time, navies other than Indian and US joined the exercise with the armada including Japan, Singapore and Australia. Also for the first time, the exercise was shifted from the Indian Ocean to the Pacific Ocean.

India's Left Front parties that have criticised Prime Minister Manmohan Singh's government on the India-US civilian nuclear deal had vehemently protested the exercise, seeing it as another sign of the growing closeness between the two countries. At one time, the Indian government was known to have considered postponing or canceling the exercise but the Indian Navy put its foot down, saying the logistics involved made any delay impossible. Protests against USS Nimitz were seen in India when it dropped anchor off Chennai in July.

China, which did not officially comment on the exercise, was known to be unhappy over the event as it was being conducted in the Bay of Bengal for the first time. China has been cultivating naval cooperation with Bangladesh and Myanmar to gain access to the Bay of Bengal and has been strengthening military cooperation with Sri Lanka. In June, China had issued a 'demarche' to India, United States, Japan and Australia seeking details about their four-nation meeting, termed a Quadrilateral Initiative. India and Australia had quickly assured Beijing that security and defence issues did not form part of the meeting's agenda.

Edition	Year	Participants	Exercise Area	Vessels	Exercises	Ref
4	2002	(India) (United States)	Arabian Sea	INS Delhi, INS Gomati, INS Shankul, INS Aditya; USS Chancellorsville, USS Paul F. Foster	Basic passing maneuvers, anti-submarine (ASW) exercises and replenishment-at-sea drills	
5	2003	(India) (United States)	India's west coast	INS Brahmaputra, INS Ganga, INS Shalki; USS Fitzgerald, USS Chosin, USS Pasadena	3 dimensional, anti-submarine warfare exercises, helicopter maneuvers, VBSS drills	
6	2004	(India) (United States)	India's west coast	INS Aditya, INS Mysore, INS Brahmaputra, INS Shankul USS Alexandria, USS Cowpens, USS Gary	War at sea, submarine familiarization exercises, small boat transfers, group maneuvers, nighttime maneuvers, VBSS drills	
7	2005	(India) (United States)	India's west coast	INS Viraat, INS Shankul; USS Nimitz, USS Santa Fe	Dissimilar air combat tactics (DACT), joint salvage diving exercises, a 24-hour 'war at sea' simulation	
8	2006	(India) (United States) (Canada)	India's west coast	USS Boxer Expeditionary Strike Group (BOXESG; 13 ships including amphibious ships, cruisers, destroyers, USS Providence, marines from the 15th Marine Expeditionary Unit) Indian guided missile frigates and destroyers HMCS Ottawa Coast guard ships included USCGC John Midgett and an Indian Coast Guard patrol ship	Expeditionary ops. Exchange of coast guard practices in maritime law enforcement, anti-piracy operations, pollution control, search and rescue, and VBSS support. During the second phase, BOXESG conducted Indian port stops including Mumbai and Goa allowing it a chance to experience Indian culture, re-supply, and support a Habitat for Humanity project.	
9	2007	(India) (United States)	Philippine Sea	Three carriers INS Viraat, USS Nimitz, USS Kitty Hawk USS John S. McCain, USS Mustin, USS Curtis Wilbur, USS Fitzgerald, USS Stethem, USS Gary, USS Greeneville INS Mysore, INS Rana, INS Ranjit, INS Jyoti, INS Kuthar and various Indian Naval aircraft.	Command of the sea, maritime interdiction, exercises in all warfare areas. VBSS drills, surface exercises, coordinated fire, air defense and ASW exercises.	
10	2007	(India) (United States) (Japan) (Australia) (Singapore)	Bay of Bengal	27 ships (8 of Indian Navy, 14 from US Navy, and the remaining from JMSDF, RAN, RSN) USS Nimitz, USS Kitty Hawk, USS Chicago, two guided missile cruisers, and six guided missile destroyers. INS Viraat, INS Mysore, INS Rana, INS Ranjit, INS Jyoti, INS Kuthar RAN represented by a frigate and a tanker; JMSDF by two destroyers; and RSN by a frigate.	DACT, cross deck exercises, patrollings, air defence and ASW exercises, exercises related to maritime threats	

== 2008–2014 ==
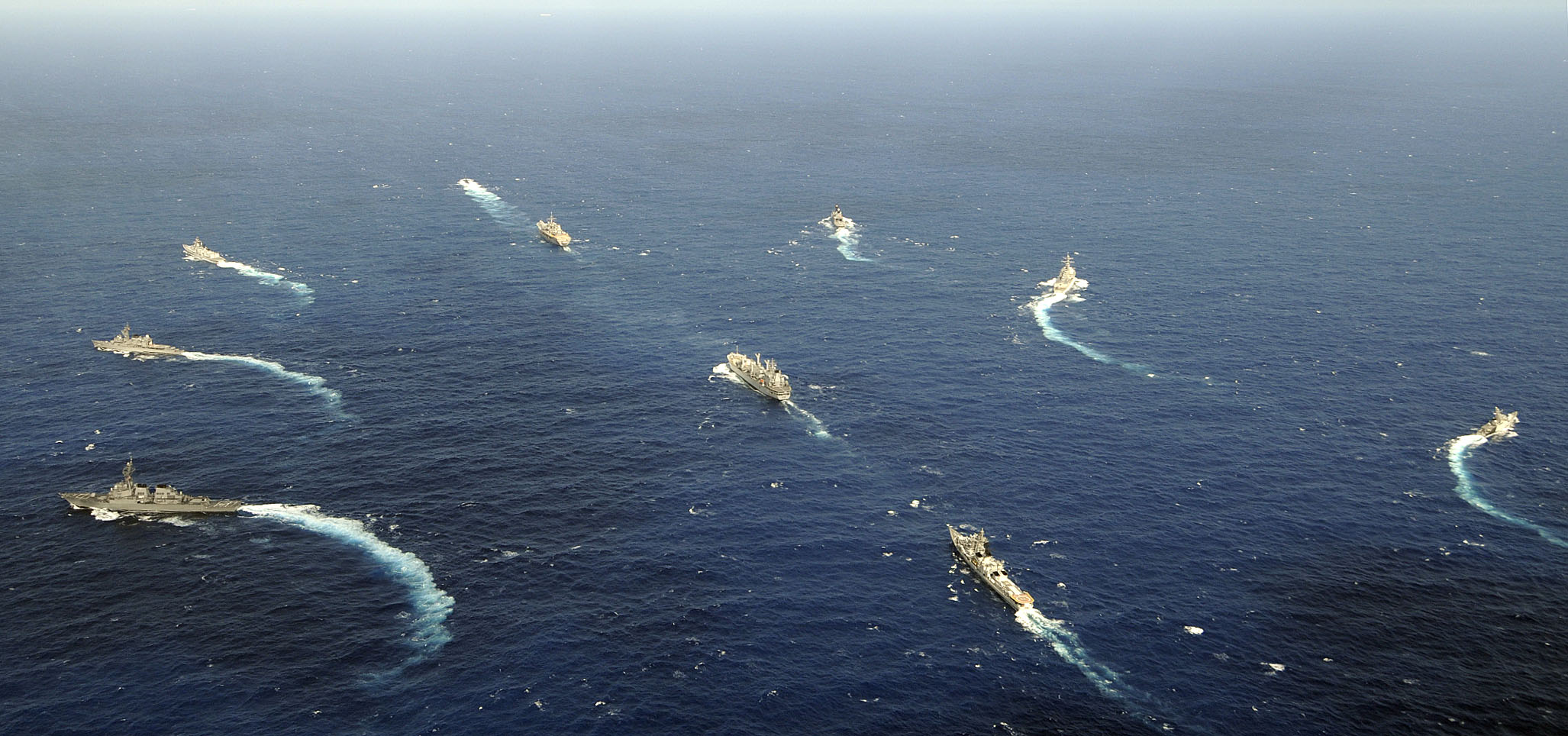
Maritime forces from India, Japan and the U.S. during Malabar 2009

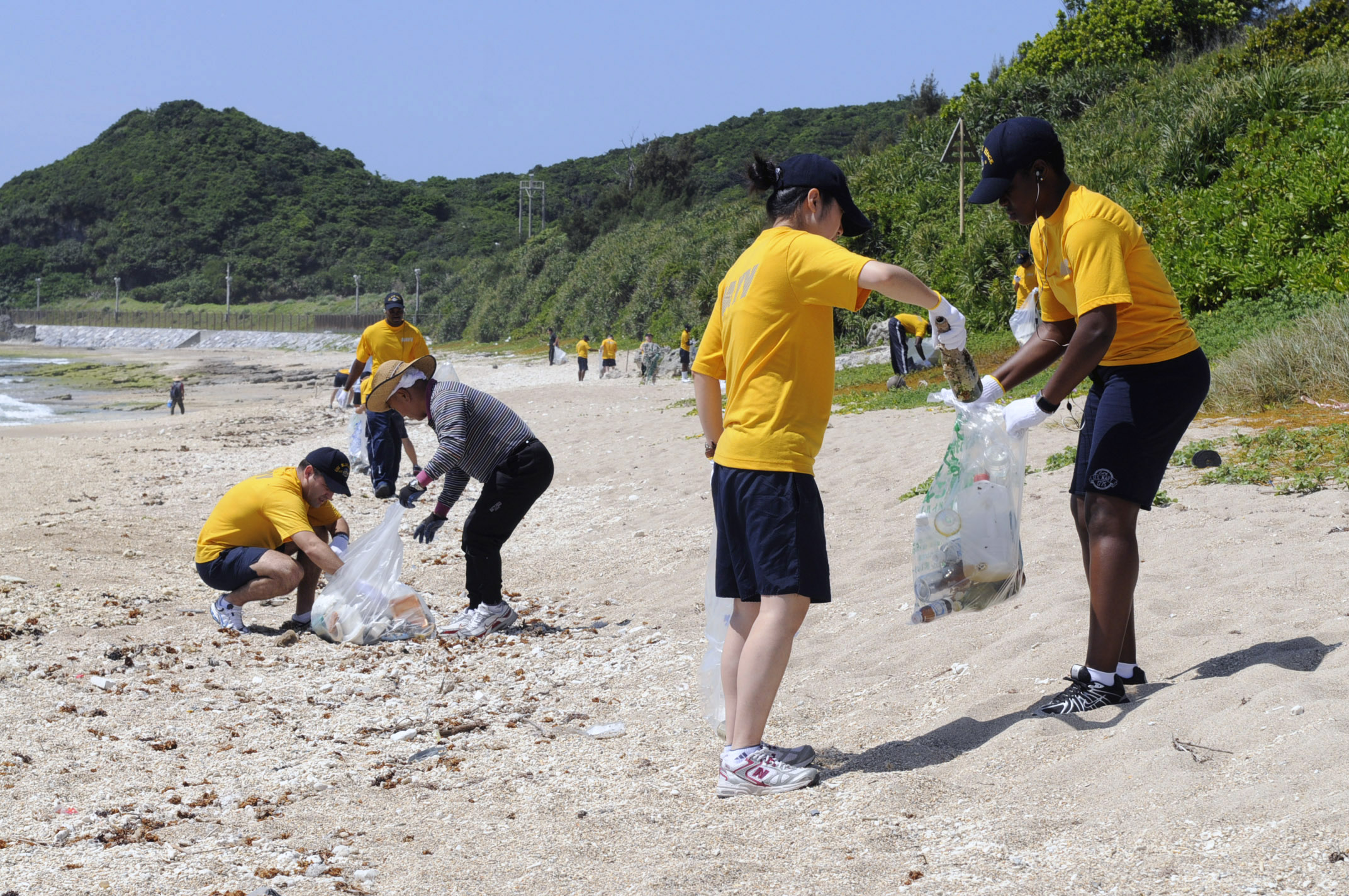
Sailors from USS Blue Ridge and embarked 7th Fleet staff cleaning up White Beach in Okinawa, Japan as part of the community service project, Malabar 2009.

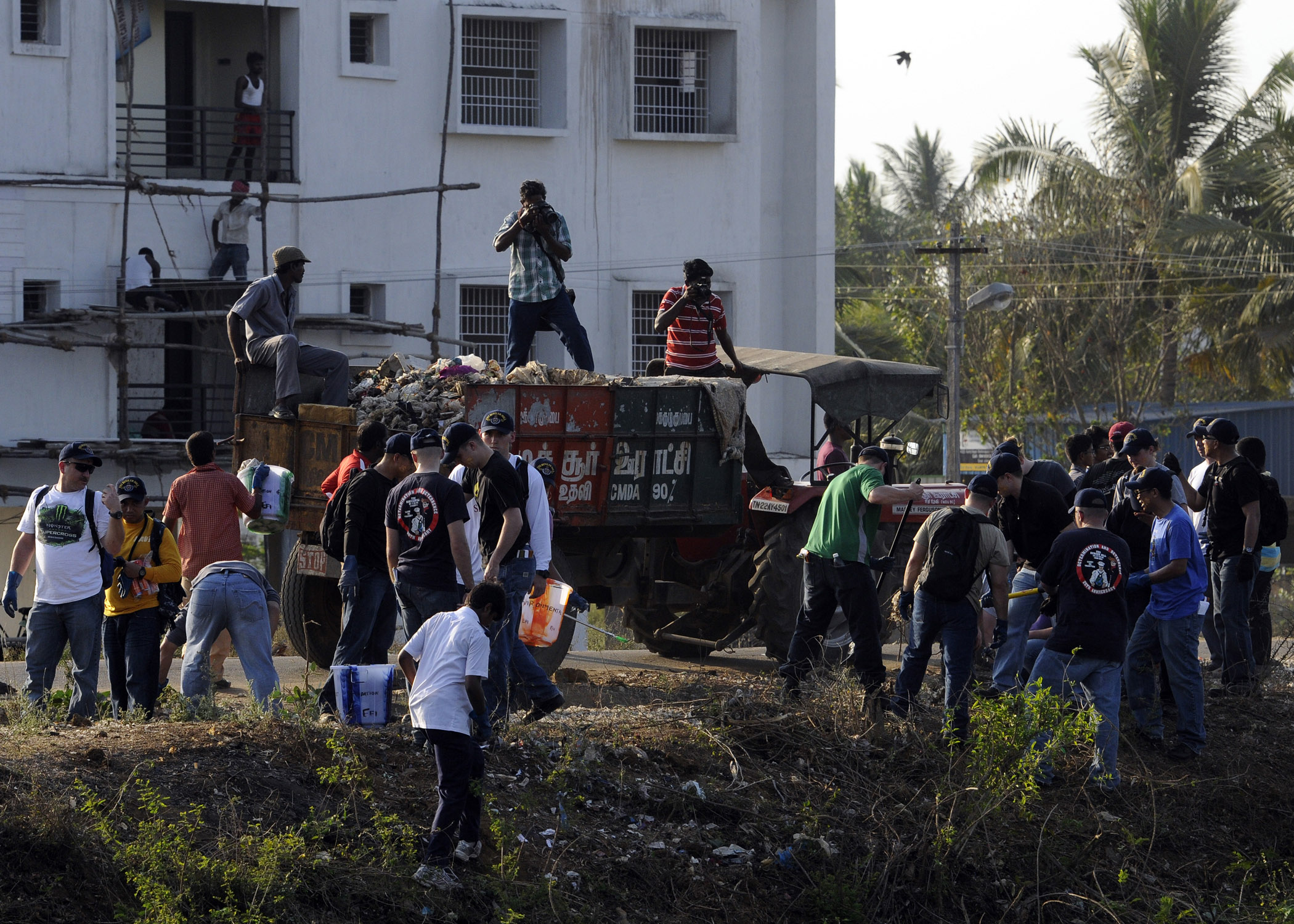
Sailors assigned to the USS Bunker Hill work with Indian locals to clean a lake during a community relations project in support of Malabar 2012.

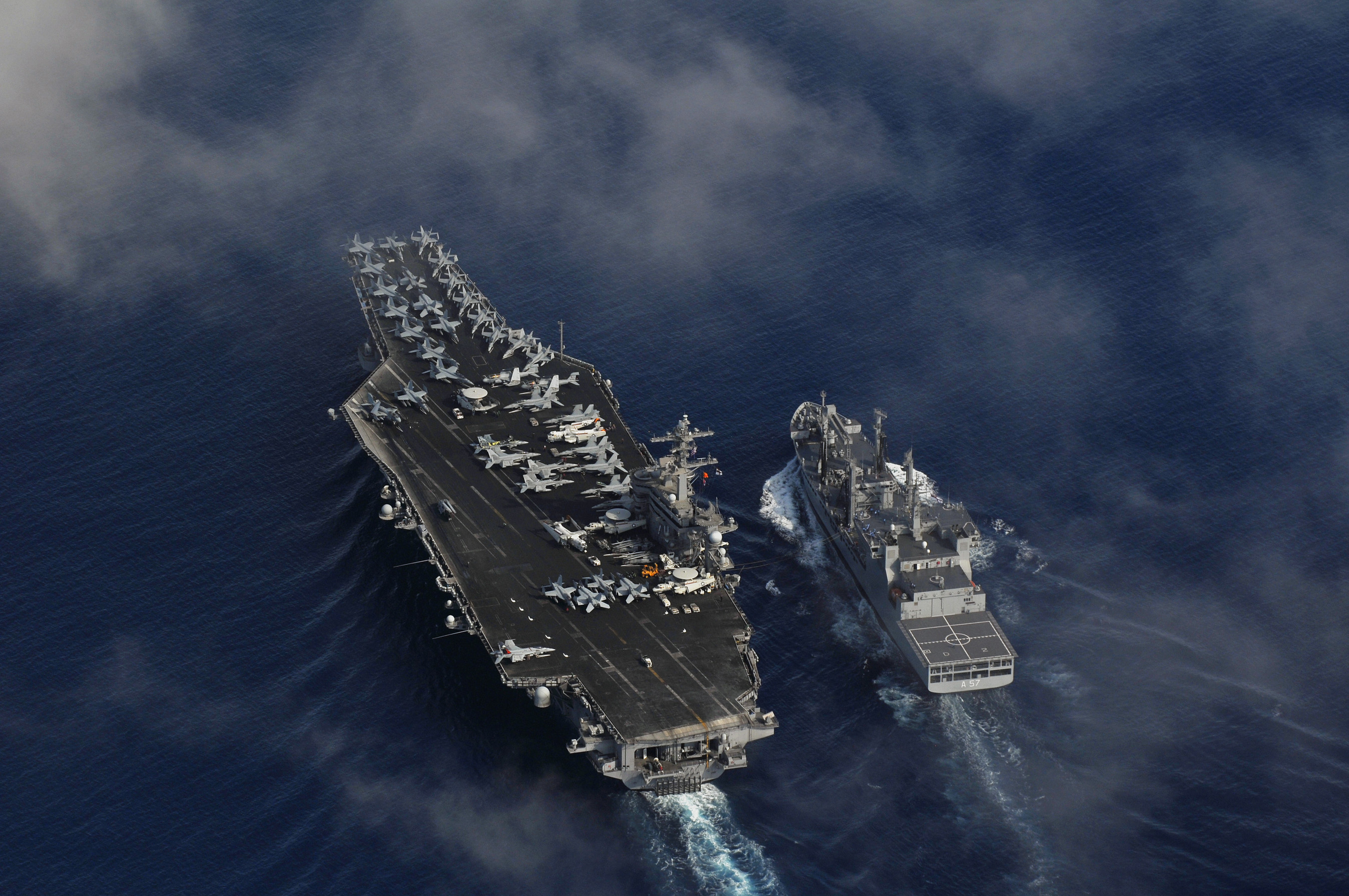
INS Shakti replenishing USS Carl Vinson during Malabar 2012.

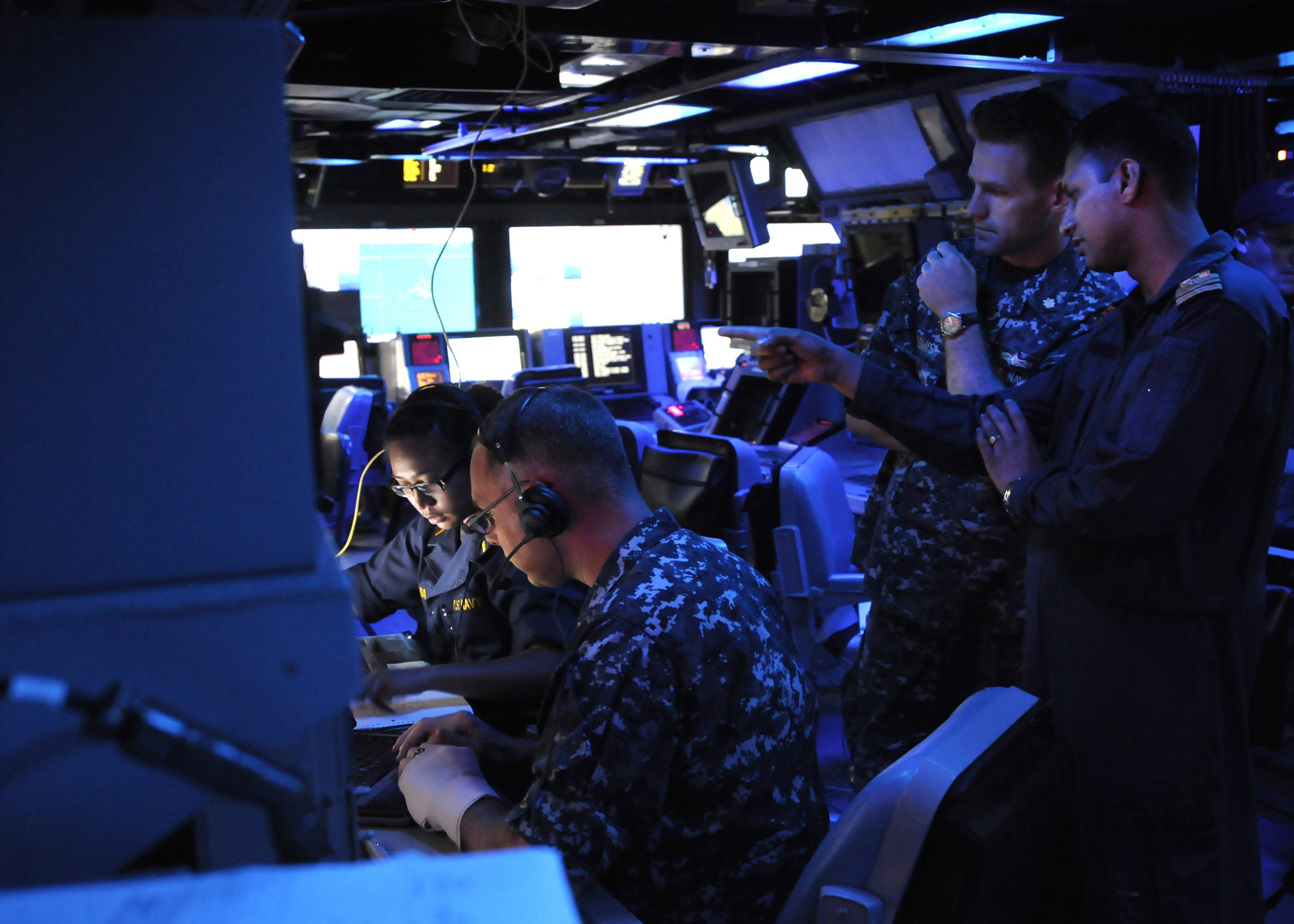
An Indian Naval officer observes operations in the combat information center aboard USS Bunker Hill in support of Malabar 2012.

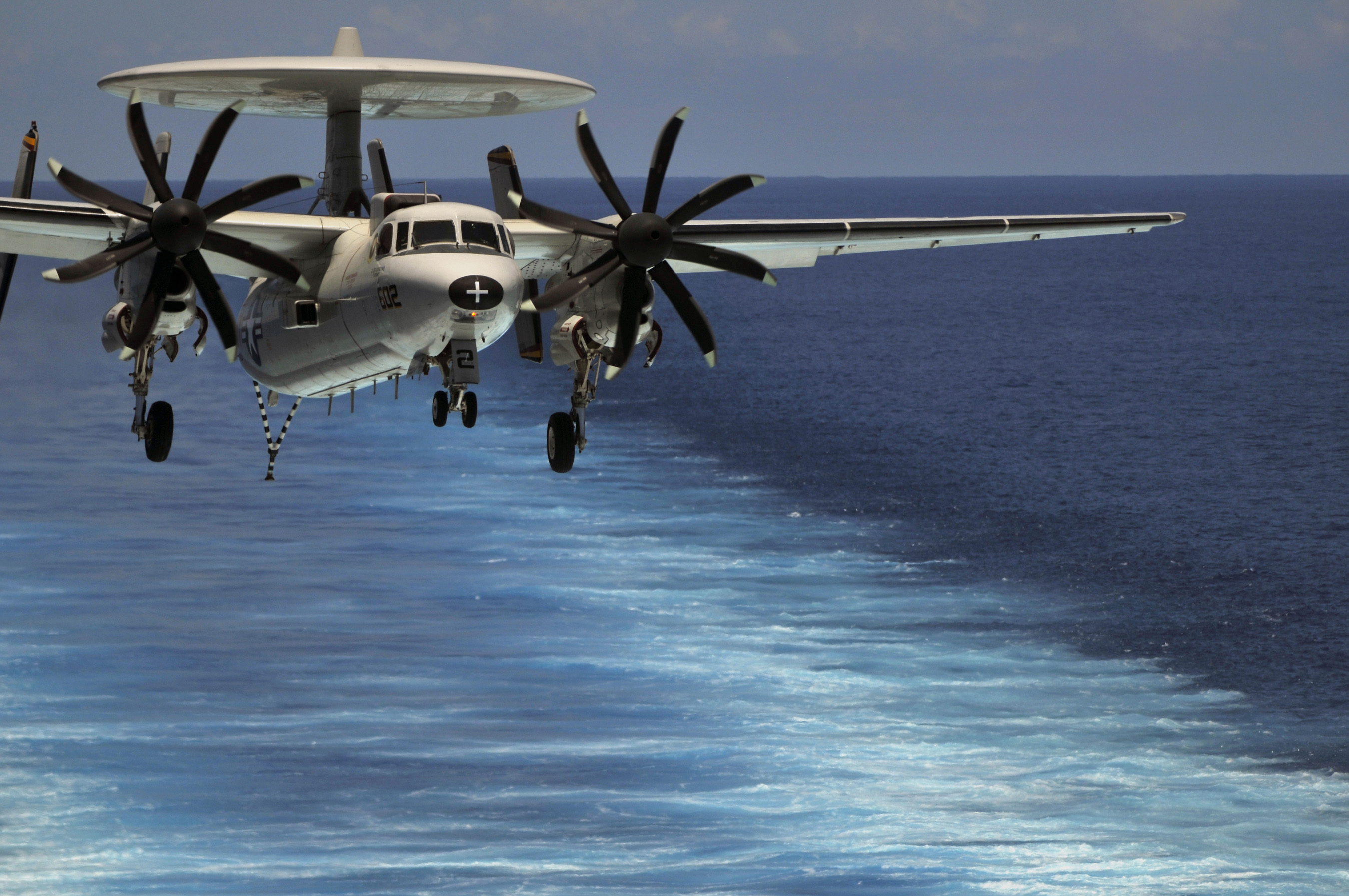
An E-2C Hawkeye aircraft assigned to Carrier Airborne Early Warning Squadron (VAW) 125 lands on USS Carl Vinson during Malabar 2012.

Domestic political changes in Australia and Japan, as well as China's opposition, resulted in Malabar 2008 being on a much smaller scale with only participation from India and the US, and being conducted in the Indian Ocean. Some protests in India against the 2008 exercise were led by the Communist Party of India (Marxist).

While the 2009 exercises were trilateral, India did not participate in the amphibious assault exercise in Japan.

India had stopped involving more countries in the exercises after China, in 2007, sent demarches to all the participants of a five-nation naval exercise held in the Bay of Bengal. With the Japanese participation in 2009 raising no political storm, India was once again agreeable to the idea of allowing the JMSDF to participate.

The Tōhoku earthquake and tsunami on the east coast of Japan in March 2011 caused Japan to back out of the next Malabar which was held off the Okinawa coast.

Edition	Year	Participants	Exercise Area	Vessels	Exercises	Ref
11	2008	(India) (United States)	Arabian Sea	USS Ronald Reagan's Carrier Strike Group Seven, USS Springfield, USNS Bridge, USS Gridley, USS Thach, USS Decatur INS Mumbai, INS Rana; INS Talwar, INS Godavari, INS Brahmaputra, INS Betwa, INS Aditya; and a submarine.	Surface, sub-surface and air exercises, firing exercises, VBSS	
12	2009	(India) (United States) (Japan)	Japan	INS Mumbai, INS Khanjar, INS Ranvir, INS Jyoti, JDS Kurama, JDS Asayuki, USS Blue Ridge, USS Fitzgerald, USS Chafee, USS Seawolf	VBBS techniques, surface warfare maneuvers, anti-submarine warfare, gunnery training, air defense.	
13	2010	(India) (United States)	India's west coast	USS Shiloh, USS Lassen, USS Chafee, USS Curts, USS AnnapolisINS Mysore, INS Godavari, INS Brahmaputra, INS Tabar, INS Shishumar	Surface and anti-submarine warfare, coordinated gunnery exercises, air defense, and visit, board, search, and seizure drills. Sailors took part in professional exchanges and discussions while at-sea and on shore. US Navy personnel participated in a community service project during the port visit to Goa.	
14	2011	(India) (United States)	Japan	Carrier Strike Group Seven. Sterett, Stethem; Reuben James; USS Santa Fe INS Delhi, INS Ranvijay, INS Ranvir; INS Kirch, INS Jyoti.	Exercise's coincided with the Indian Navy's western Pacific deployment. Exercise events included liaison officer professional exchanges and embarks; communications exercises; surface action group exercise operations; formation maneuvering; helicopter cross deck evolutions; underway replenishments; humanitarian assistance and disaster relief; gunnery exercises; VBSS; maritime strike; air defense; screen exercise and ASW.	
15	2012	(India) (United States)	Bay of Bengal	Carrier Strike Group 1 comprising USS Carl Vinson, embarked Carrier Air Wing 17, USS Bunker Hill, USS Halsey, USNS Bridge. INS Satpura, INS Ranvir, INS Ranvijay, INS Kulish, INS Shakti	Communications exercises, surface action group (SAG) operations, helicopter cross-deck evolutions, and gunnery exercises. The participants split into two SAGs, with Bunker Hill leading one and Satpura leading the other.	
16	2013	(India) (United States)	India's east coast	USS McCampbell INS Shivalik, INS Ranvijay	'At-Sea' phase included professional exchanges and embarkations; communications exercises; Surface Action Group operations; leapfrogs; helicopter cross-deck evolutions; gunnery exercises; VBSS and ASW.	
17	2014	(India) (United States) (Japan)	Japan	INS Ranvijay, INS Shivalik, INS ShaktiUS Navy Carrier Strike group based on USS George Washington, one submarine, two destroyers, one tanker	Carrier strike group operations, maritime patrol and reconnaissance operations, anti piracy and VBSS exercises, search and rescue exercises, helicopter cross-deck landings, underway replenishment, gunnery and ASW exercises, and liaison officer exchange and embarkation.	

== 2015–2019 ==
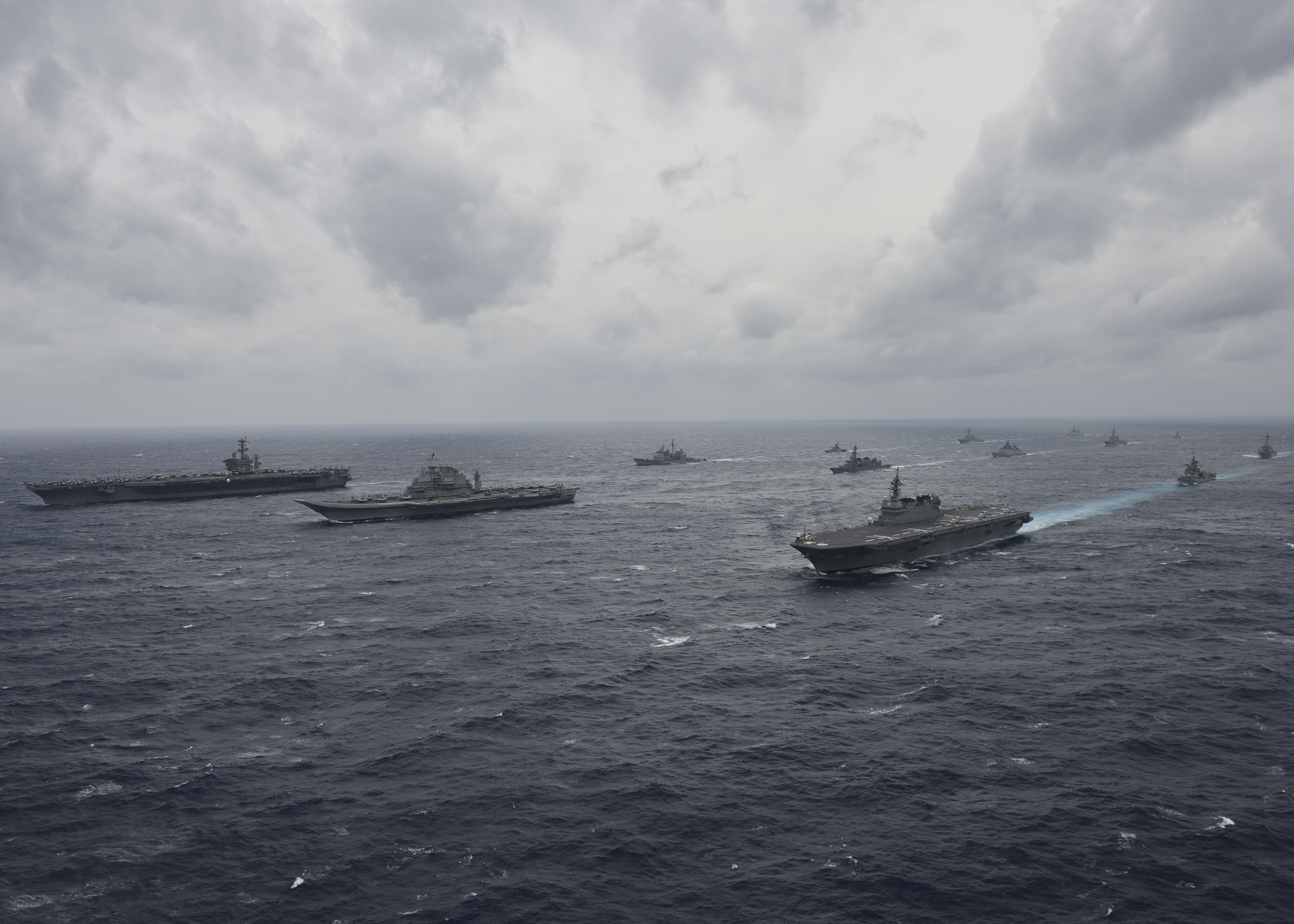
Ships of the United States, India and Japan in the Bay of Bengal during exercise Malabar 2017.

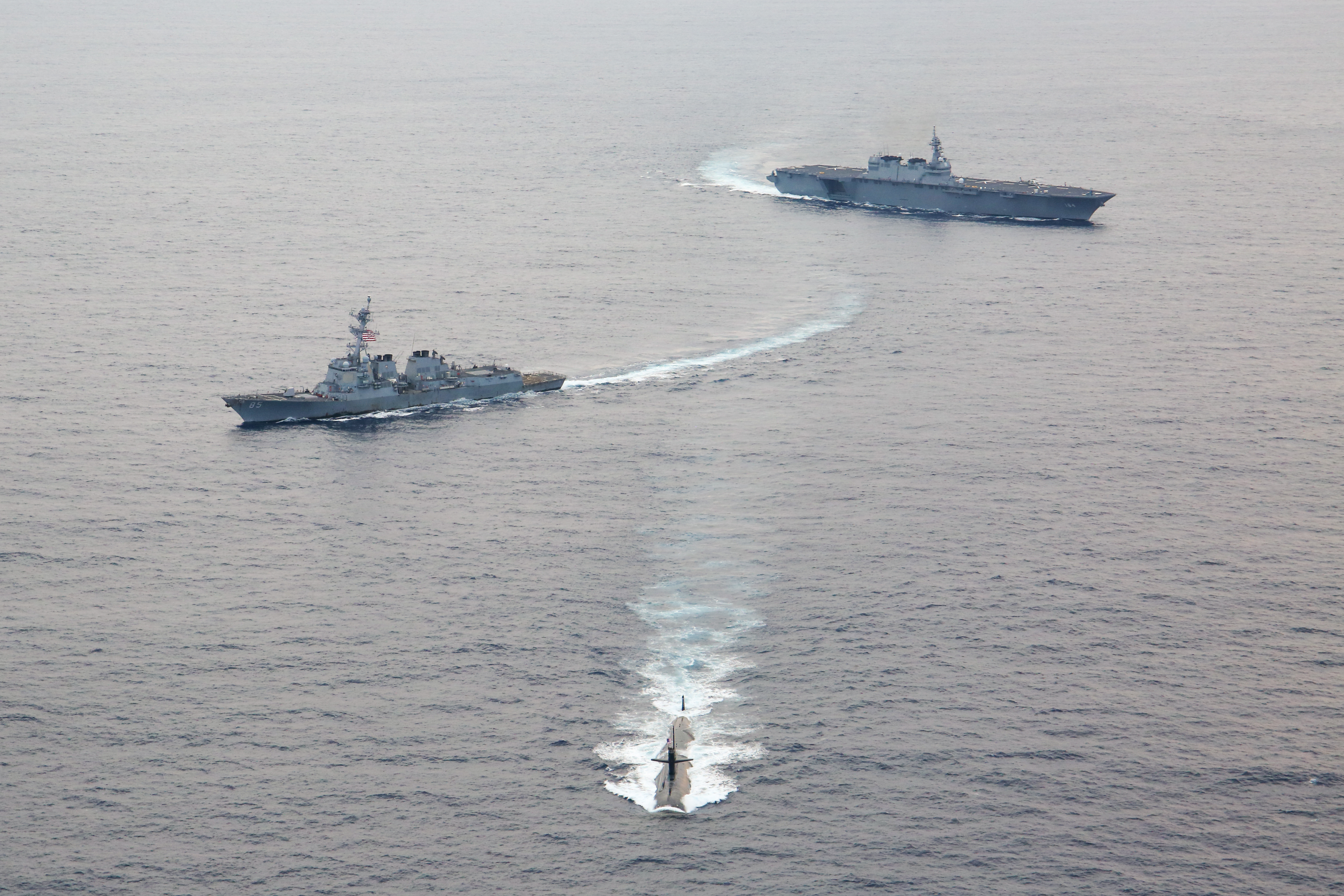
American, Indian, and Japanese ships participating in Malabar 2019.

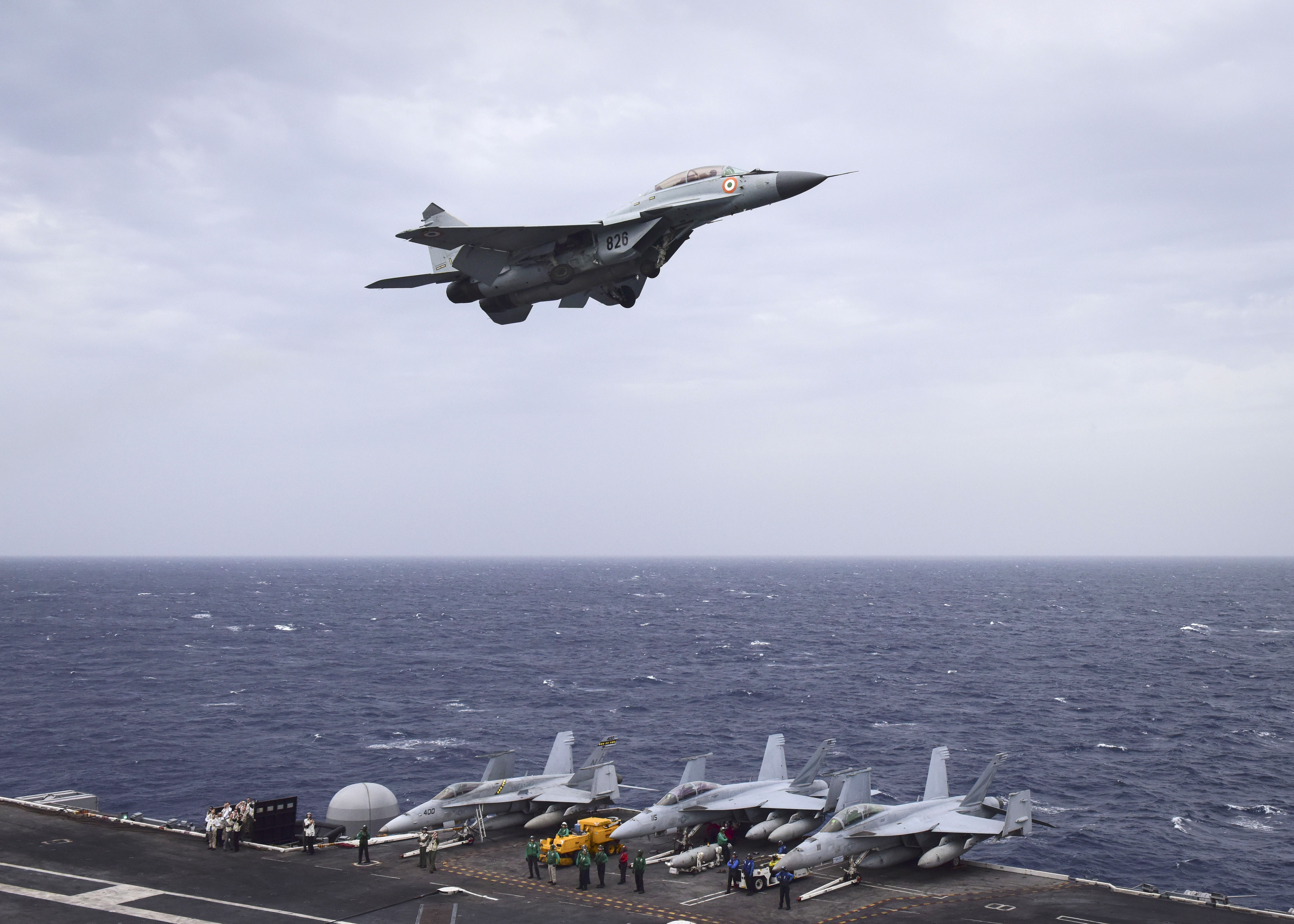
An Indian Navy MIG-29K Fulcrum aircraft flies over USS Nimitz.

On 26 January 2015, the U.S. President and Indian Prime Minister agreed, in a joint statement, to upgrade exercise Malabar. India invited Japan to be a part of exercise, held in the Bay of Bengal. Japan joined as a permanent member.

In 2015, the United States brought up the fact that India was doing its "bare minimum" with regard the participation in the exercise. However, seeming to understand India's limitation, the United States has also responded accordingly. For India, one of the reasons for converting Malabar into a multilateral exercise has been "resource optimisation". As the number of maritime bilateral exercises over the years has been increasing, the Navy's resources are heavily strained. Further, the returns from the international exercises seem to be levelling out. Inviting China to "socialise" during the Malabar exercises has been suggested.

The 2018 Malabar exercise was conducted from 7 to 16 June 2018 off the coast of Guam in the Philippine Sea. This was the 22nd edition of the exercise and the first time it was held on United States territory. The exercise is divided into two phases. The harbour phase was held from 7 to 10 June at Naval Base Guam, and the sea phase from 11 to 16 June. Based on news reports, India refused Australia participation in the exercise to avoid posturing it as a military group against China.

Edition	Year	Participants	Exercise Area	Vessels	Exercises	Ref
18	2015	(India) (United States) (Japan)	Bay of Bengal	INS Sindhuraj, INS Ranvijay, INS Shivalik, INS Betwa, INS ShaktiUSS Theodore Roosevelt, USS Normandy, USS Fort Worth, USS City of Corpus Christi JS Fuyuzuki		
19	2016	(India) (United States) (Japan)	Philippine Sea	USS John C. Stennis with embarked Carrier Air Wing 9, USS Mobile Bay, USS John C. Stennis, USS Stockdale, USS William P. Lawrence, USS Chung-Hoon INS Satpura, INS Sahyadri, INS Shakti JS Hyūga	Submarine familiarization (SUBFAM); high-value unit exercises; medical drills and other exercises and maneuvers.	
20	2017	(India) (United States) (Japan)	Bay of Bengal	A total of 16 ships, 2 submarines and 95 aircraft participated in this exercise.INS Vikramaditya, INS Ranvir, INS Shivalik, INS Sahyadri, INS Kamorta, INS Kora, INS Kirpan, Sindhughosh-class submarine, INS Jyoti USS Nimitz, USS Princeton, USS Howard, USS Shoup and USS Kidd, a Los Angeles-class submarine JS Izumo and its air wing, JS Sazanami	Aircraft carrier operations, air defense, ASW, surface warfare, VBSS, search and rescue (SAR), joint and tactical procedures. Joint training between the naval special forces.	
21	2018	(India) (United States) (Japan)	Philippine Sea	INS Sahyadri, INS Kamorta, INS ShaktiUSS Ronald Reagan. USS Antietam USS Chancellorsville, USS Benfold, USS Mustin, a Los Angeles-class submarine JS Ise, JS Sazanami, JS Fuyuzuki, a submarine	Onshore and at-sea training, aircraft carrier operations, maritime patrol and reconnaissance operations, visit, board, search and seizure operations and professional exchanges	
22	2019	(India) (United States) (Japan)	Japan	INS Sahyadri, INS Kiltan USS McCampbell JS Kaga, JS Samidare, JS Chōkai		

== 2020–present ==
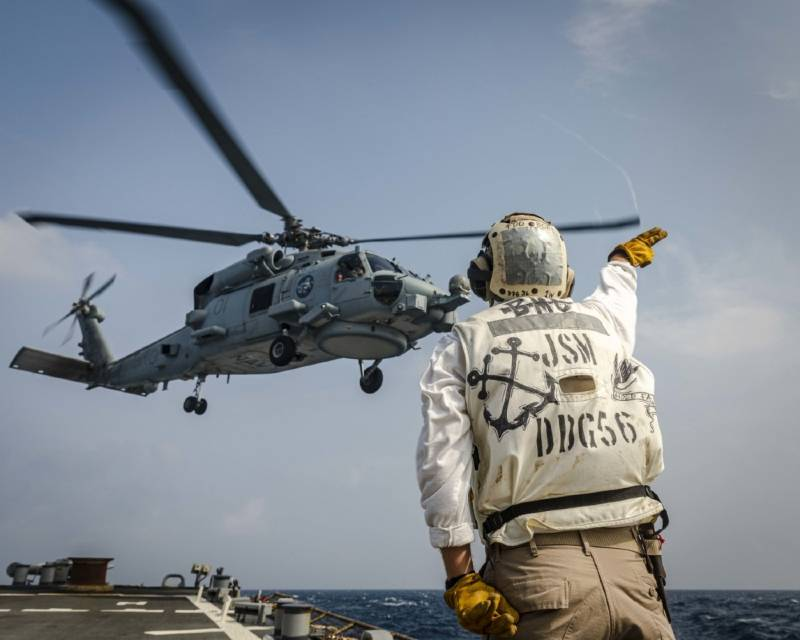
Australian MH 60R takeoff from USS John S. McCain, Malabar 2020.

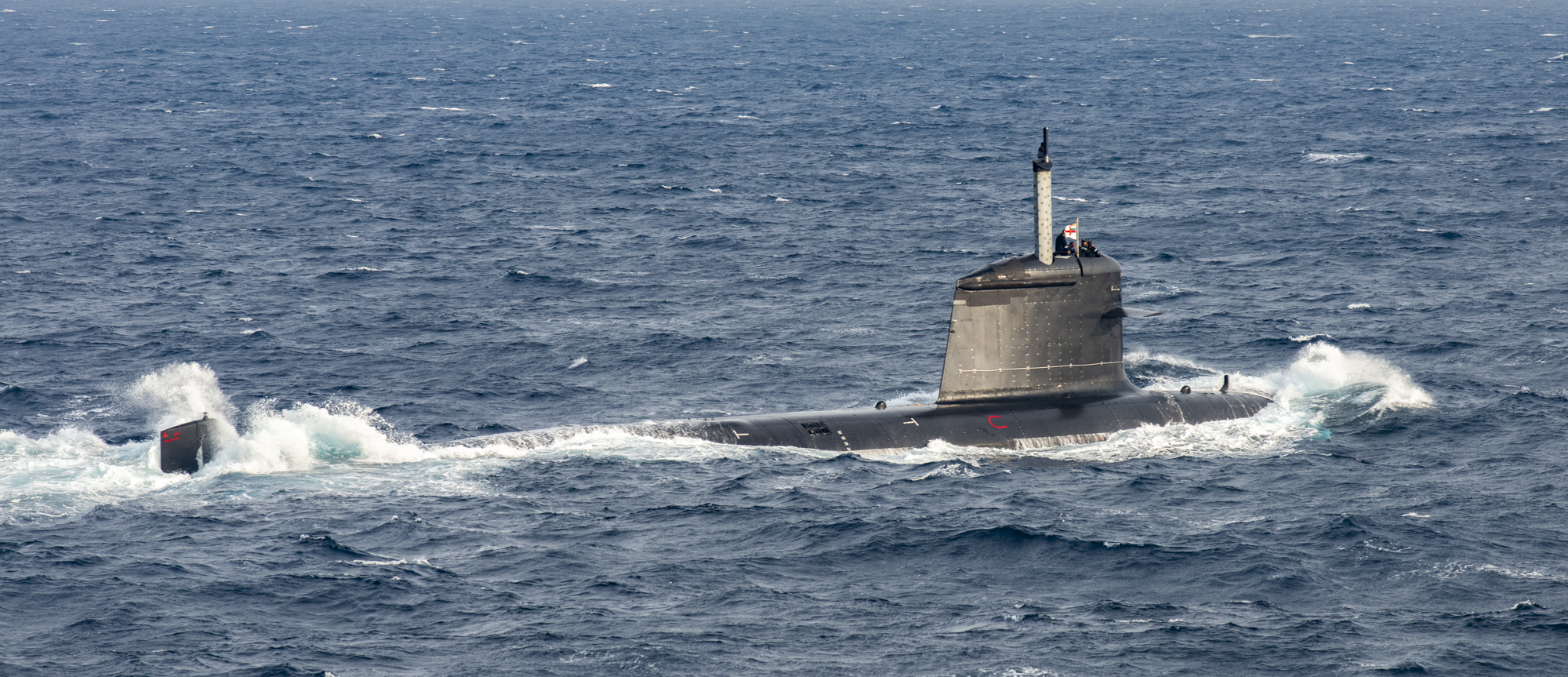
INS Khanderi (S51) steams in formation while participating in Malabar 2020 in the north Arabian Sea.

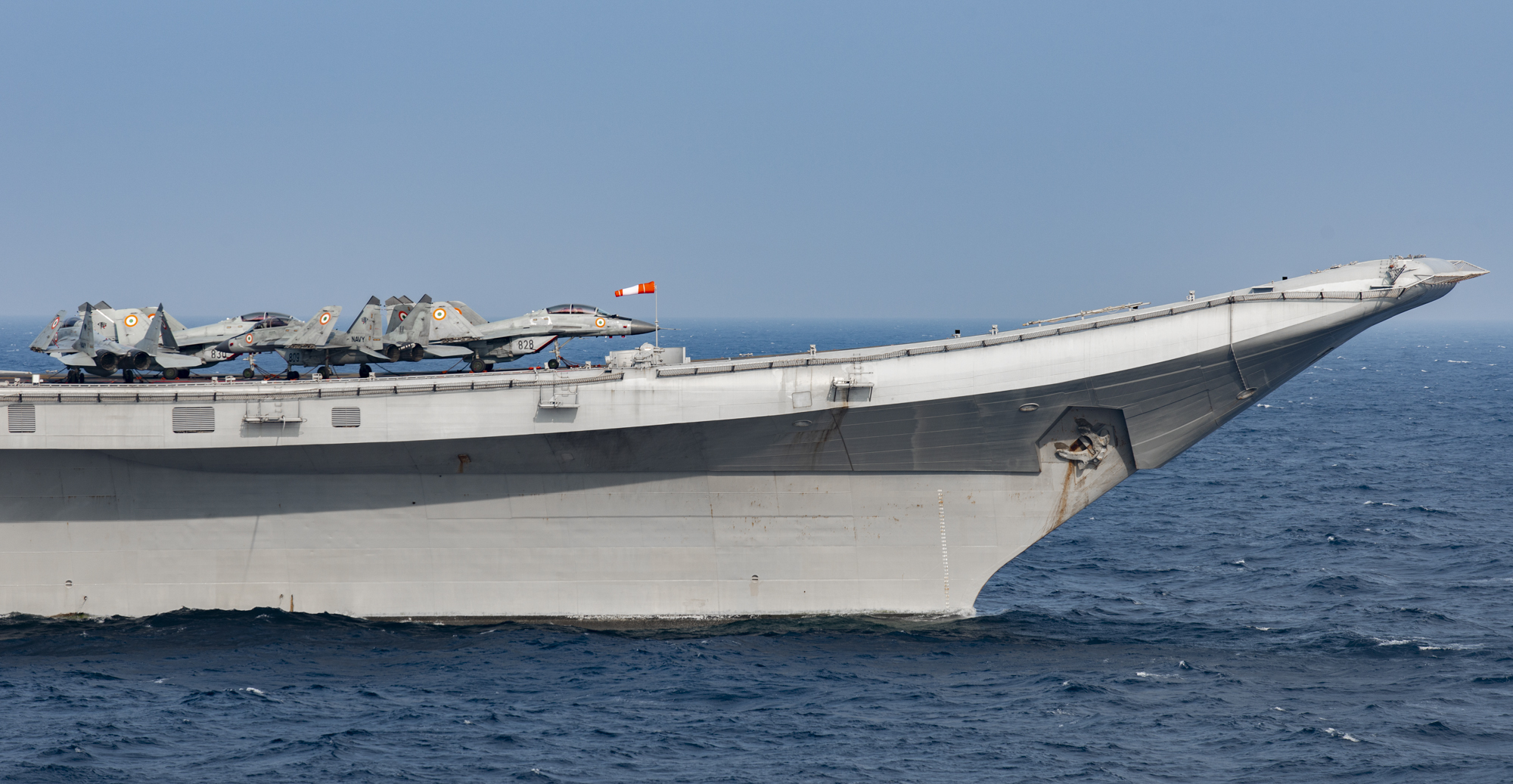
INS Vikramaditya (R 33) steams in formation while participating in Malabar 2020 in the north Arabian Sea.

Malabar 2020 was a "non-contact, at sea only" exercise taking into consideration the COVID-19 pandemic. It was decided that Australia shall also be a part of the Malabar Naval exercise, in view to support a free, open and rule based Indo Pacific. Since the revival of the Quad by the US in November 2017, India had been reluctant to incorporate Australia into the Malabar exercise since it would have reinforced the false perception that the Quad was a de-facto military alliance. However, following China's aggressive actions against India in the disputed land border area of Galwan Valley (Ladakh), India agreed to enhance its deterrence against China by welcoming Australia into the Malabar exercise. This is the first time that all four navies of the Quad will be in a joint exercise in 13 years. US Deputy Secretary of State Stephen E Biegun, on 20 October 2020, said that Quad should be "more regularised", and at some point "formalised" with the passage of time.

It was reported in the Sunday Telegraph on 7 March 2021 that France planned to join the four other nations in 2021, and had planned its annual Jeanne d'Arc naval exercise around this event. Since the revival of the Quad in November 2017, much against the pushing by the Americans, India had resisted the incorporation of a 'willing' Australia into Malabar exercises. This was essentially to avoid propagating a false perception that the Quad was a de-facto military alliance. However, after China's aggressive move against India in Galawan (Ladakh) in 2020, India relented and welcomed Australia into Malabar, making it a quadrilateral exercise.

Edition	Year	Participants	Exercise Area	Vessels	Exercises	Ref
23	2020	(India) (United States) (Japan) (Australia)	(1) Bay of Bengal (2) Arabian Sea	USS John S. McCain, INS Shakti, INS Ranvijay, INS Shivalik, INS Sindhuraj, HMAS Ballarat, JS Ōnami. Two carrier battle groups— Vikramaditya and Nimitz.	Phase II included tactical training night operations, underway replenishment, and gunnery exercises.	
24	2021	(India) (United States) (Japan) (Australia)	(1) Philippine Sea (2) Bay of Bengal	USS Barry, Task Force 72 aircraft, USNS Rappahannock, INS Shivalik, INS Kadmatt, JS Kaga, JS Murasame, JS Shiranui, HMAS Warramunga INS Ranvijay, INS Satpura, USS Carl Vinson, USS Lake Champlain, USS Stockdale, HMAS Ballarat, HMAS Sirius, JS Kaga, JS Murasame		
25	2022	(India) (United States) (Japan) (Australia)	East China Sea	USS Ronald Reagan, USS Chancellorsville, USS Milius, INS Shivalik, INS Kamorta, HMAS Arunta, HMAS Stalwart, JS Hyūga, JS Takanami, JS Shiranui, JS Ōsumi		
26	2023	(India) (United States) (Japan) (Australia)	South Pacific Ocean	INS Kolkata, INS Sahyadri, HMAS Choules, HMAS Brisbane, USS Rafael Peralta, JS Shiranui, submarines		
27	2024	(India) (United States) (Japan) (Australia)	Bay of Bengal	9 ships; integral helicopters and aircraft INS Delhi, INS Satpura, INS Kamorta, INS Kadmatt, Shishumar-class submarine, INS Shakti, USS Dewey, JS Ariake, HMAS Stuart. P-8 Poseidon (RAAF, USN), MH-60R Romeo (RAN)	8 - 18 October (at Visakhapatnam) Complex ASuW, AAW and ASW drills, along with underway replenishment, joint manoeuvres and advanced tactical exercises.	
28	2025	(India) (United States) (Japan) (Australia)	South Pacific Ocean	JS Hyūga, INS Sahyadri, HMAS Ballarat, USS Fitzgerald P-8A Poseidon (RAAF), MH-60R Romeo (RAN)	10–18 November. Harbour Phase (10–12 November) was hosted in Guam. Complex drills in anti-submarine warfare, air defence and replenishment at sea	
29	2026	(India) (United States) (Japan) (Australia)	South Pacific Ocean	JS Ise, JS Mogami, unkown Japanese submarine, HMAS Stuart, INS Sahyadri, unknown San Antonio-class amphibious transport dock P-8A Poseidon (RAAF, USN), P-1 (JMSDF)	5–12 November. Sea phase is being hosted on the main island of Honshu, Kantō region. Anti-submarine warfare, anti-surface warfare drills and a joint sail photo exercise	

== See also ==
Geostrategy

- AirSea Battle
- Interoperability
- Blue Team (U.S. politics)
- China containment policy
- India–United States relations
- List of disputed territories of China
- Quadrilateral Security Dialogue
- String of Pearls (Indian Ocean)
- Territorial disputes in the South China Sea
- US-Philippines Balikatan Exercise

International relations

- India-China relations
- China-United States relations
- India-Australia relations
- India-Japan relations
- India–United States relations
