= INS Sahyadri =

Indian Navy Frigate

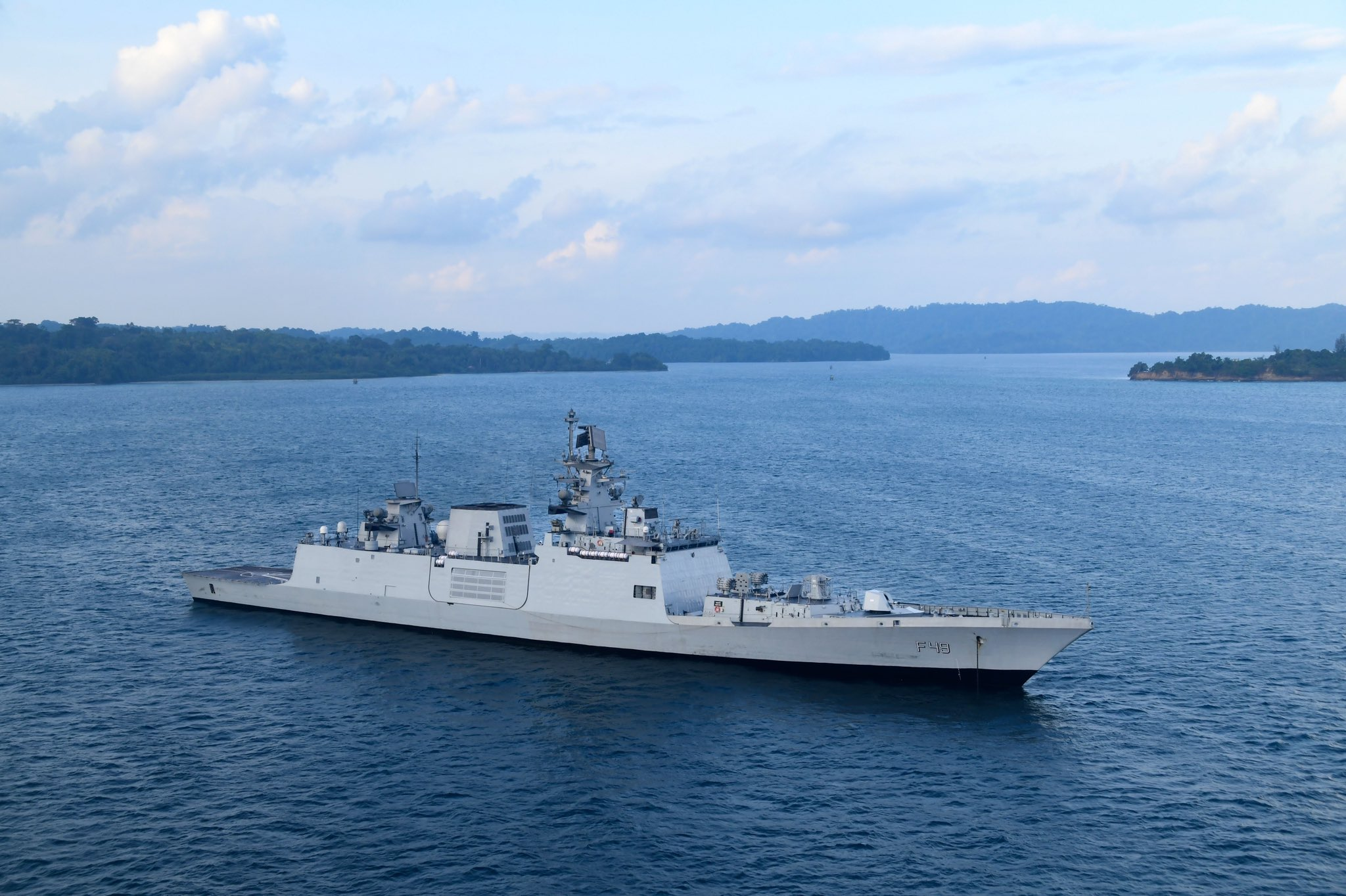
- Sahyadri at sea.

History

India
- Name: Sahyadri
- Namesake: Sahyadri hills
- Builder: Mazagon Dock Limited
- Cost: $245 Million
- Laid down: 17 March 2003
- Launched: 27 May 2005
- Completed: 2010
- Commissioned: 21 July 2012
- Identification: F49
- Status: Active
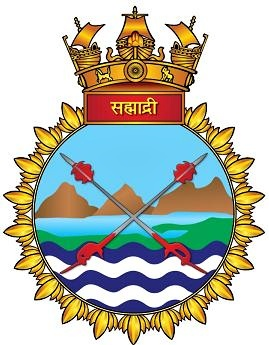
- Badge

General characteristics
- Class & type: Shivalik-class guided missile frigate
- Displacement: 6,200 tonnes (6,100 long tons; 6,800 short tons) full load
- Length: 142.5 m (468 ft)
- Beam: 16.9 m (55 ft)
- Draught: 4.5 m (15 ft)
- Installed power: 2 × Pielstick 16 PA6 STC Diesel engines (11,300 kW each); 2 × GE LM2500+ (25,100 kW each)
- Propulsion: CODOG
- Speed: 32 knots (59 km/h; 37 mph); 22 knots (41 km/h; 25 mph) (diesel engines)
- Complement: 257 (including 35 officers + 222 sailors)
- Sensors & processing systems: Radar :-; 1 x Fregat M2EM 3-D radar (Surface & Air); 4 × MR-90 Orekh radar; 1 × Elta EL/M-2238 STAR; 2 × Elta EL/M 2221 STGR; 1 × BEL APARNA; Sonar :-; BEL HUMSA-NG active/passive sonar; Thales Sintra active towed-array sonar; Combat Suite :-; "Combat Management System" (CMS-17A)
- Electronic warfare & decoys: BEL Ellora electronic warfare suite; Decoy:-; 4 x Kavach decoy launchers
- Armament: Anti-air missiles: 1 × Shtil-1 single-arm surface-to-air missile launcher (24 missiles); 32-cell VLS for Barak 1 point-defence surface-to-air missiles; Anti-ship/Land-attack missiles: 8 × VLS launched BrahMos, anti-ship and land-attack cruise missiles; Guns: 1 × OTO Melara 76 mm naval gun; 2 × AK-630 CIWS; 2 x OFT 12.7 mm M2 Stabilized Remote Controlled Gun; Anti-submarine warfare: 2 × 2 DTA-53-956 torpedo launchers; 2 × RBU-6000 (RPK-8) rocket launchers
- Aircraft carried: 2 × HAL Dhruv or Sea King Mk. 42B helicopters.

INS Sahyadri (F49) is a Shivalik-class stealth multi-role frigate built for the Indian Navy. This class features improved stealth and land attack capabilities over the preceding Talwar-class frigates. The ship is affiliated with Indian Army's Poona Horse armoured regiment.

== Construction ==
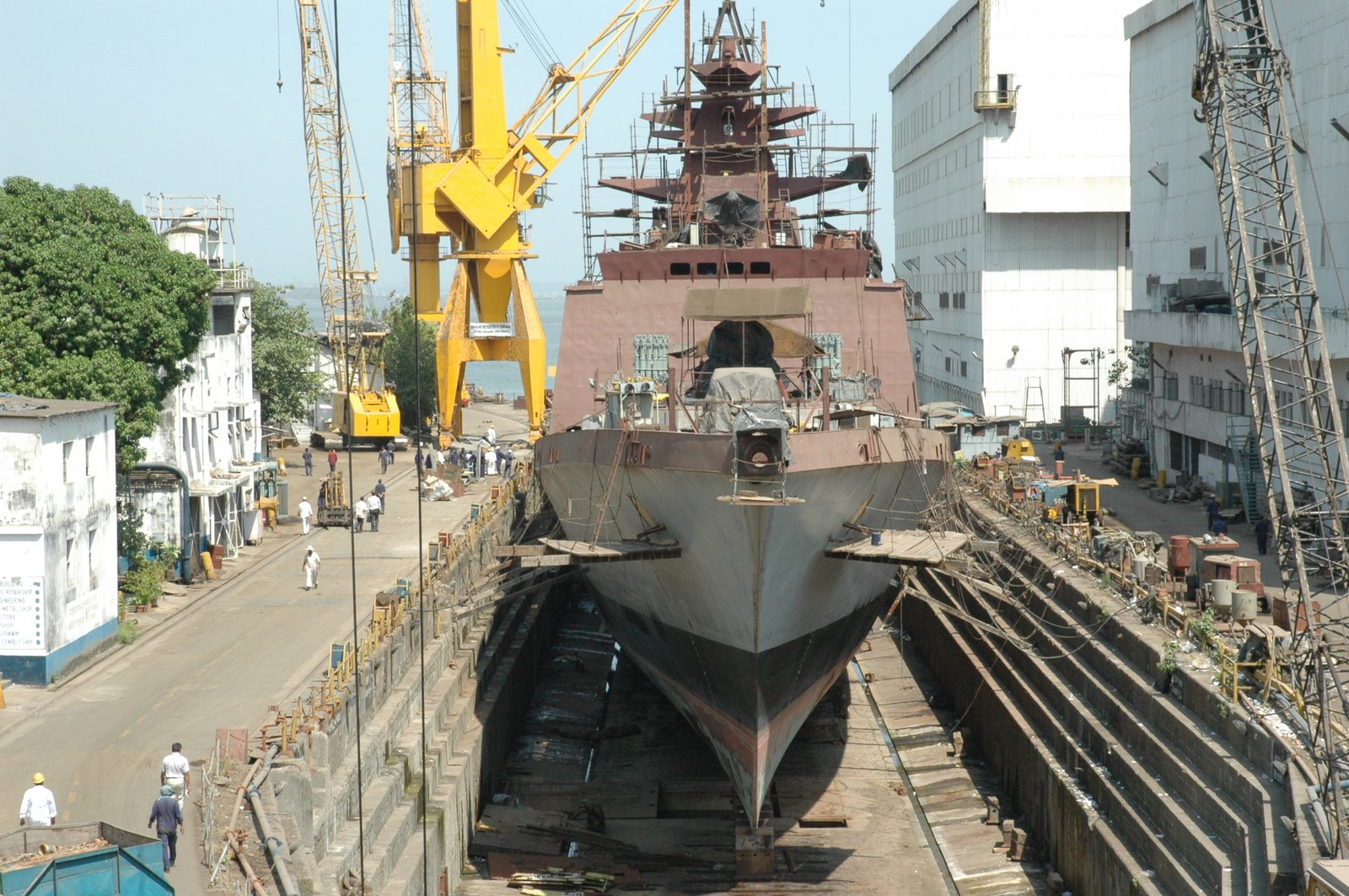
Sahyadri under construction

INS Sahyadri was built at the Mazagon Dock Limited (MDL) located in Mumbai. The keel of the vessel was laid on 30 September 2003 and was launched on 27 May 2005. It underwent sea trials in 2011–2012. From there it was commissioned on 21 July 2012 into the Eastern Naval Command headquartered at Visakhapatnam.

== Service history ==
| Deployment | Date | Port Visited | Commander | Notes and References |
|---|---|---|---|---|
2012
| Commissioned | | | Captain Sanjay Vatsayan | |
2013
| International Fleet Review 2013 | October | Sydney, Australia | | |
2014
| South East Asia and Western Pacific | 10-13 June | Darwin, Australia | Captain Jyotin Raina | |
| South East Asia and Western Pacific | 2 July - 2 August | Hawaii, United States | Captain Jyotin Raina | Exercise RIMPAC |
| South East Asia and Western Pacific | 20 August | Manila, Philippines | Captain Jyotin Raina | |
2015
| South China Sea and the Northwest Pacific | 2-5 October | Da Nang, Vietnam. | Captain Kunal Singh Rajkumar | |
| South China Sea and the Northwest Pacific | 15 October | Sagami Bay, Japan | Captain Kunal Singh Rajkumar | International Fleet Review organized by the Japanese Maritime Self Defense Force (JMSDF) |
| South China Sea and the Northwest Pacific | 23-27 October | Incheon, South Korea | Captain Kunal Singh Rajkumar | |
| South China Sea and the Northwest Pacific | 1-4 November | Manila, Philippines | Captain Kunal Singh Rajkumar | |
| INDRA 2015 with INS Sahyadri, INS Ranvijay, INS Shakti, INS Sindhuvir and other naval aircraft | 7-12 December | Bay of Bengal | | Bi-lateral exercise with the Russian Navy |
2016
| South China Sea and Northwestern Pacific with naval frigate INS Satpura, corvette INS Kirch and fleet-tanker INS Shakti | 30 May - 2 June | Subic Bay, Philippines | Captain K S Rajkumar | |
| South China Sea and Northwestern Pacific with naval frigate INS Satpura, corvette INS Kirch and fleet-tanker INS Shakti | 14-17 June | Sasebo, Japan | Captain K S Rajkumar | Malabar 2016 |
| South China Sea and Northwestern Pacific with naval frigate INS Satpura, corvette INS Kirch and fleet-tanker INS Shakti | 21-25 June | Busan, South Korea | Captain K S Rajkumar | |
| South China Sea and Northwestern Pacific with naval frigate INS Satpura, corvette INS Kirch and fleet-tanker INS Shakti | 27 June - 1 July | Vladivostok, Russia | Captain K S Rajkumar | |
2025
| Indian Ocean Region deployment | 7 April | Colombo, Sri Lanka | Captain Rajat Kumar | |
| Operational deployment – South China Sea and the Indo-Pacific | 2-4 October | Kemaman Port, Malaysia | Captain Rajat Kumar | Third visit of the ship to the country following a goodwill mission to Port Klang and for Exercise Samudra Laksamana at Kota Kinabalu in 2016 and 2019. |
| Operational deployment – South China Sea and the Indo-Pacific | 13 October | Busan Naval Base, South Korea | Captain Rajat Kumar | Participated in the maiden edition of the IN-RoKN Bilateral Exercise with ROKS Gyeongnam. |
| Operational deployment – South China Sea and the Indo-Pacific | 21 October | Yokosuka Naval Base, Japan | Captain Rajat Kumar | Participated in JAIMEX-25 with JMSDF ships Asahi, Ōmi and submarine Jinryū between 16 and 18 October. |
| Operational deployment – South China Sea and the Indo-Pacific | 8 November | Guam, United States | Captain Rajat Kumar | Participated in Exercise Malabar 2025 and AusIndEx-25 with HMAS Ballarat. |
| Operational deployment – South China Sea and the Indo-Pacific | 27 November | Manila, Philippines | Captain Rajat Kumar | |
2026
| International Fleet Review | 18 February | Visakapatanam | Captain Vikas Jha | |
| Operational deployment | 20 September – 3 October | Subic Bay, Philippines | Captain Vikas Jha | Participation in ASEAN Defence Ministers’ Meeting (ADMM)-Plus Joint Cooperation Activity (JCA) with INS Kulish (P63). The ASEAN-India Maritime Exercise (AIME 2026) concluded on 3 October. |
| Operational deployment | 10 – 18 October | Vladivostok, Russia | Captain Vikas Jha | Participation in Exercise INDRA with Russian Navy from 13 to 18 October. |
| Operational deployment | 26 – 29 October | Busan Naval Base, South Korea | Captain Vikas Jha | Participated in the second edition of the IN-RoKN Bilateral Exercise with ROKS Munmu the Great (DDH-976). |
| Operational deployment | 4 – 12 November | Yokosuka Naval Base, Japan | Captain Vikas Jha | Participation in Exercise Malabar 2026. |

=== Miscellaneous ===
INS Sahyadri was awarded the ‘Best Ship Trophy’ at the annual Fleet Awards functions six times namely in the years 2014-15, 2015-16, 2017-18, 2019-20, 2020-21 and 2022-23 and was also presented with Unit Citation in the year 2019-20 in Visakhapatnam.
