= S47 =

S47 may refer to:

- S47 (Berlin), a line of the Berlin S-Bahn
- S47 (Long Island bus)
- INS Shankul (S47), a submarine of the Indian Navy
- S47: Keep at temperature not exceeding ... °C (to be specified by the manufacturer), a safety phrase
- SABCA S.47, a Belgian fighter-bomber
- Sulfur-47, an isotope of sulfur
- USS S-47 (SS-158), a submarine of the United States Navy
