= INS Ranvijay =

Indian Navy destroyer

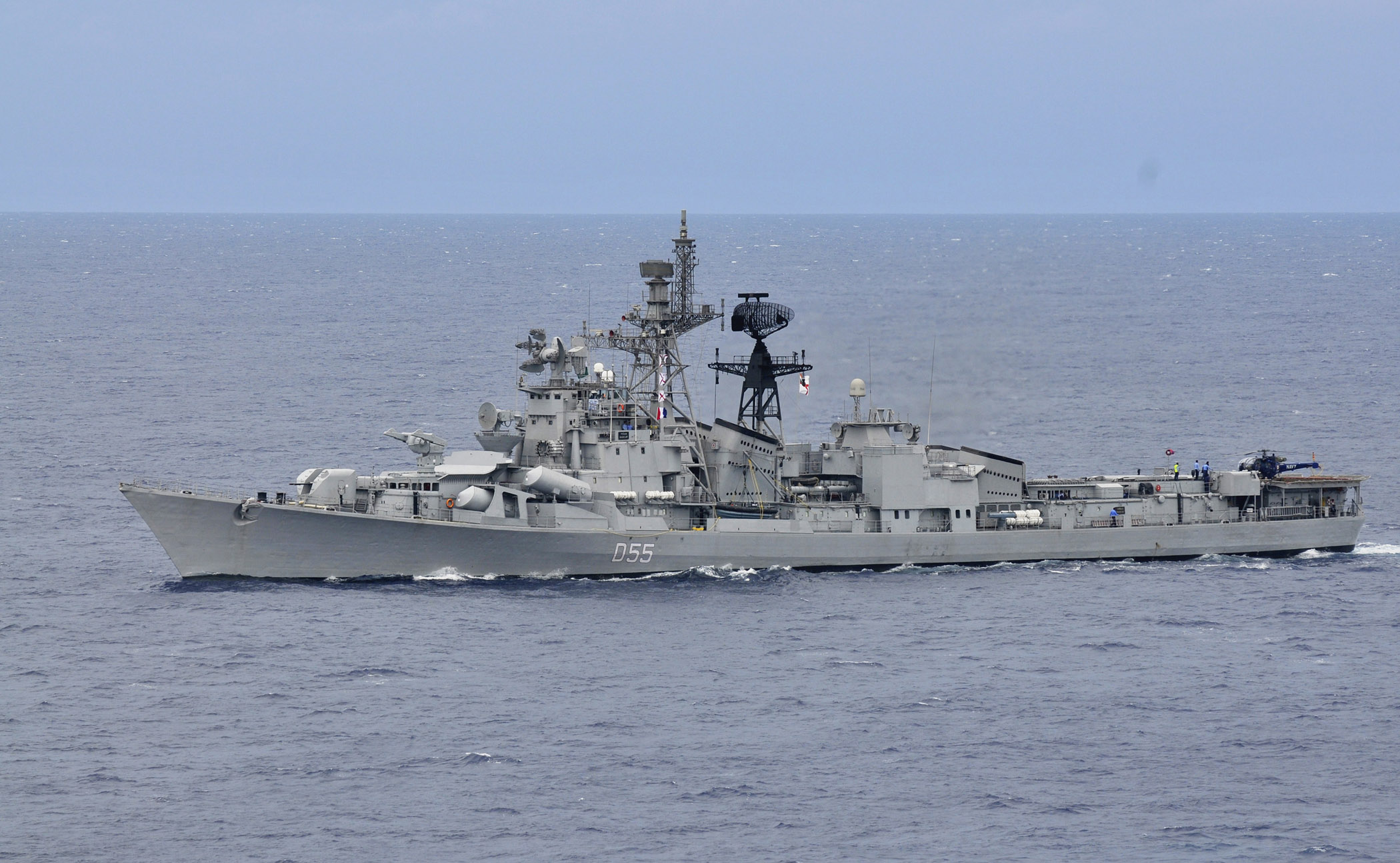
- INS Ranvijay during Exercise Malabar 2012

History

India
- Name: Ranvijay
- Builder: 61 Kommunara Shipbuilding Plant
- Commissioned: 21 December 1987
- Identification: Pennant number: D55
- Motto: Sangrame Vaibhavasya (Glorious in War)
- Status: Active
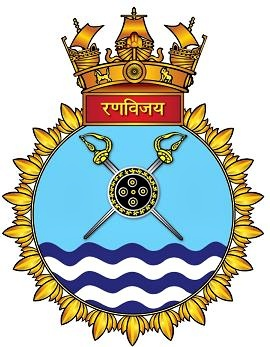
- Badge

General characteristics
- Class & type: Rajput-class destroyer
- Displacement: 3,950 tons standard; 4,974 tons full load
- Length: 147 m (482 ft)
- Beam: 16 m (52 ft)
- Draught: 5 m (16 ft)
- Propulsion: 4 x gas turbine engines; 2 shafts, 72,000 hp (54,000 kW)
- Speed: 35 knots (65 km/h)
- Range: 4,000 mi (6,400 km) at 18 knots (33 km/h); 2,600 miles (4,200 km) at 30 knots (56 km/h)
- Complement: 320 (including 35 officers)
- Sensors & processing systems: Air/Surface: EL/M-2238 STAR (replacing MR-310U Angara (NATO: Head Net-C) radar at E-band); Air: Bharat RAWL (Dutch Signaal LW08) radar at D-band ( replacing MP-500 Kliver (NATO: Big Net-A) radar at C-band); Navigation: 2 x Volga (NATO: Don Kay) radar at I-band frequency, Communication: Inmarsat, Sonar: 1 x hull mounted Vycheda MG-311 (NATO: Wolf Paw) sonar replaced with Bharat HUMSA during MLR, 1 x Vyega MG-325 (NATO: Mare Tail) variable depth sonar
- Armament: Anti-surface: 8 × BrahMos supersonic missiles in aft VLS (replaced aft S-125 SAM launcher); 4 × SS-N-2D Styx AShM missiles in inclined launchers; Air-defence: 2 × Barak SAM 8 cell launchers (port and starboard); 1 × S-125M (NATO: SA-N-1) SAM launcher (Removed by 2025); Guns: 1 x OTO Melara 76 mm naval gun (replaced AK-726 twin 3" naval gun); 2 × 30 mm (1.2 in) AK-630M CIWS; Anti-submarine: 1 × 533 mm (21 in) PTA 533 quintuple torpedo tube launcher, 2 × RBU-6000 anti-submarine rocket launcher.
- Aircraft carried: 1 × Ka-28 helicopter

INS Ranvijay (lit. 'Victorious in Battle') is a Rajput-class destroyer in active service with the Indian Navy. Ranvijay was commissioned on 21 December 1987.

== Service history ==
Ranvijay participated in the multinational Malabar Naval Exercise between Australia, India, Singapore, Japan and United States in the Bay of Bengal in the years 2011-2015 and 2020-2021.

In July 2014, Ranvijay, accompanied by the stealth frigate Shivalik and fleet tanker Shakti, took part in the INDRA War Games, a naval and army counter-terrorism exercise with Russia.

In November 2016, Ranvijay, accompanied by the corvette INS Kamorta (P28), took part in the SIMBEX War Games, a naval exercise with Singapore Navy which bought the RSN’s stealth frigate, RSS Formidable.

On 23 October 2021, Ranvijay caught fire at the Visakhapatnam Naval Base. Four of her crew were hospitalised.

INS Ranvijay participated at the International Fleet Review 2026 held at Visakapatanam.

In October 2026, the Ministry of Defence signed a contract to refit two Rajput-class destroyers and two Veer-class corvettes with BrahMos launchers and fire-control systems. INS Ranvijay is one of the likely recipients, replacing the Styx inclined launchers in the bow.

== Awards and recognition ==
INS Ranvijay has won the prestigious Cock Trophy in the annual Western Fleet whaler boat regatta held at the Naval Dockyard on 7 January 2006.

Ranvijay received the best ship of the Eastern Fleet Trophy for the year 2006–07 and 2011–12.

== Gallery ==
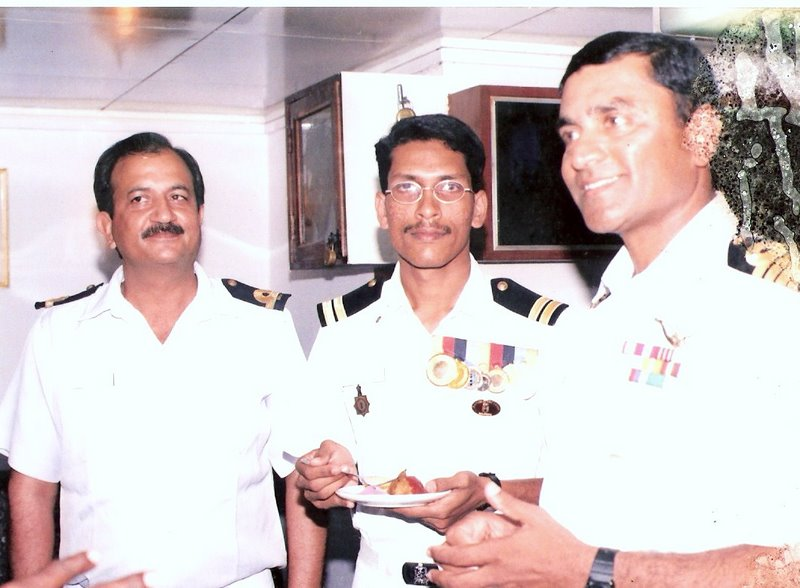
Commander C.S. Patham and Captain Ajithkumar J Varma

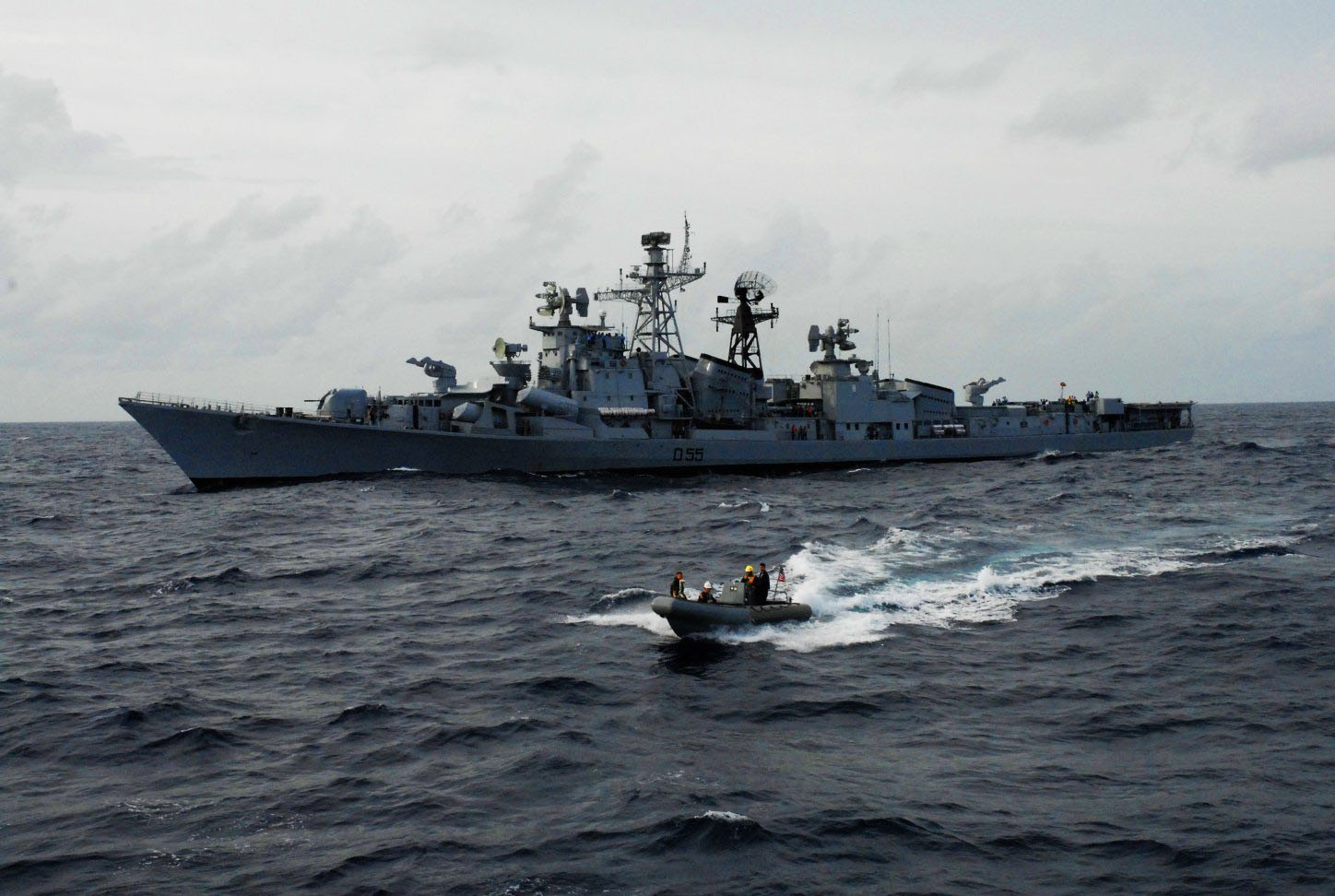
Ranvijay during Exercise Malabar 2007

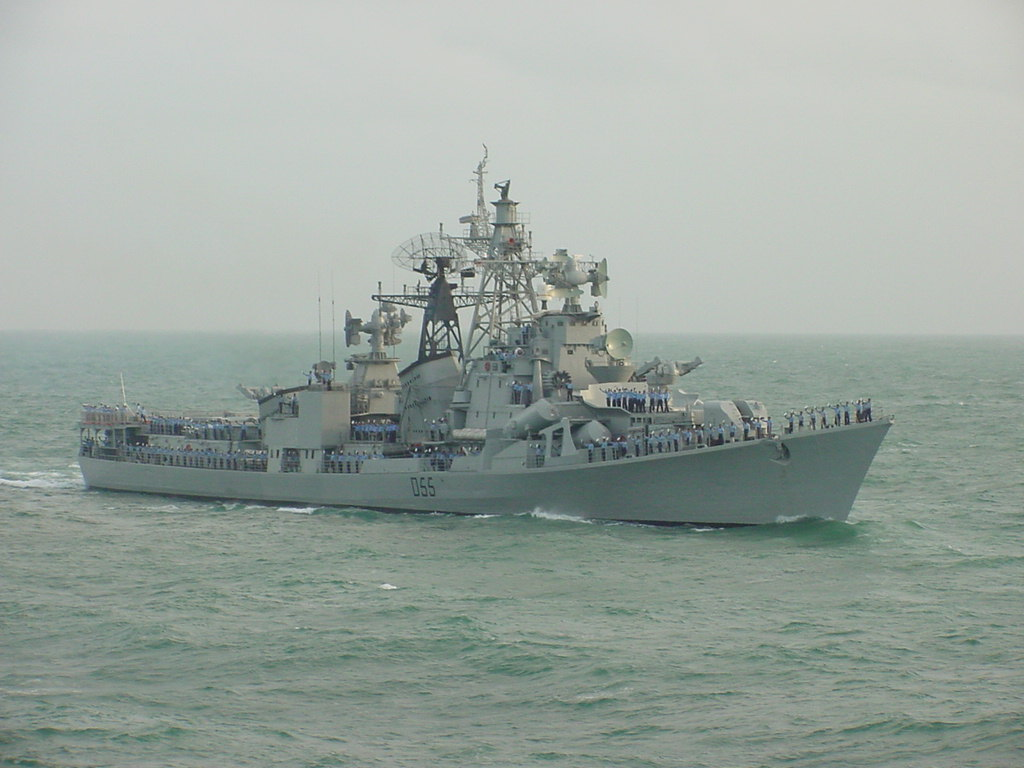
Ranvijay with sailors on deck in blue uniform
