= INS Shakti =

INS Shakti has been the name borne by three tankers which served in the Indian Navy.

- INS Shakti (1953), displacing 3,000 tonnes, was acquired in November 1953, commissioned on 29 January 1954 and decommissioned on 31 December 1967.
- INS Shakti (1975) was a Deepak-class replenishment oiler built in Germany, commissioned on 21 February 1976 and decommissioned on 21 July 2007.
- INS Shakti (A57), a modern Deepak-class fleet tanker displacing 27,550 tonnes, commissioned in 2011.
