= Jeanne d'Arc naval exercise =

The Jeanne d'Arc naval exercise is an annual naval exercise conducted by the French navy. It is a rite of passage from the École navale.
