= INS Shivalik =

Indian lead ship of Shivalik-class

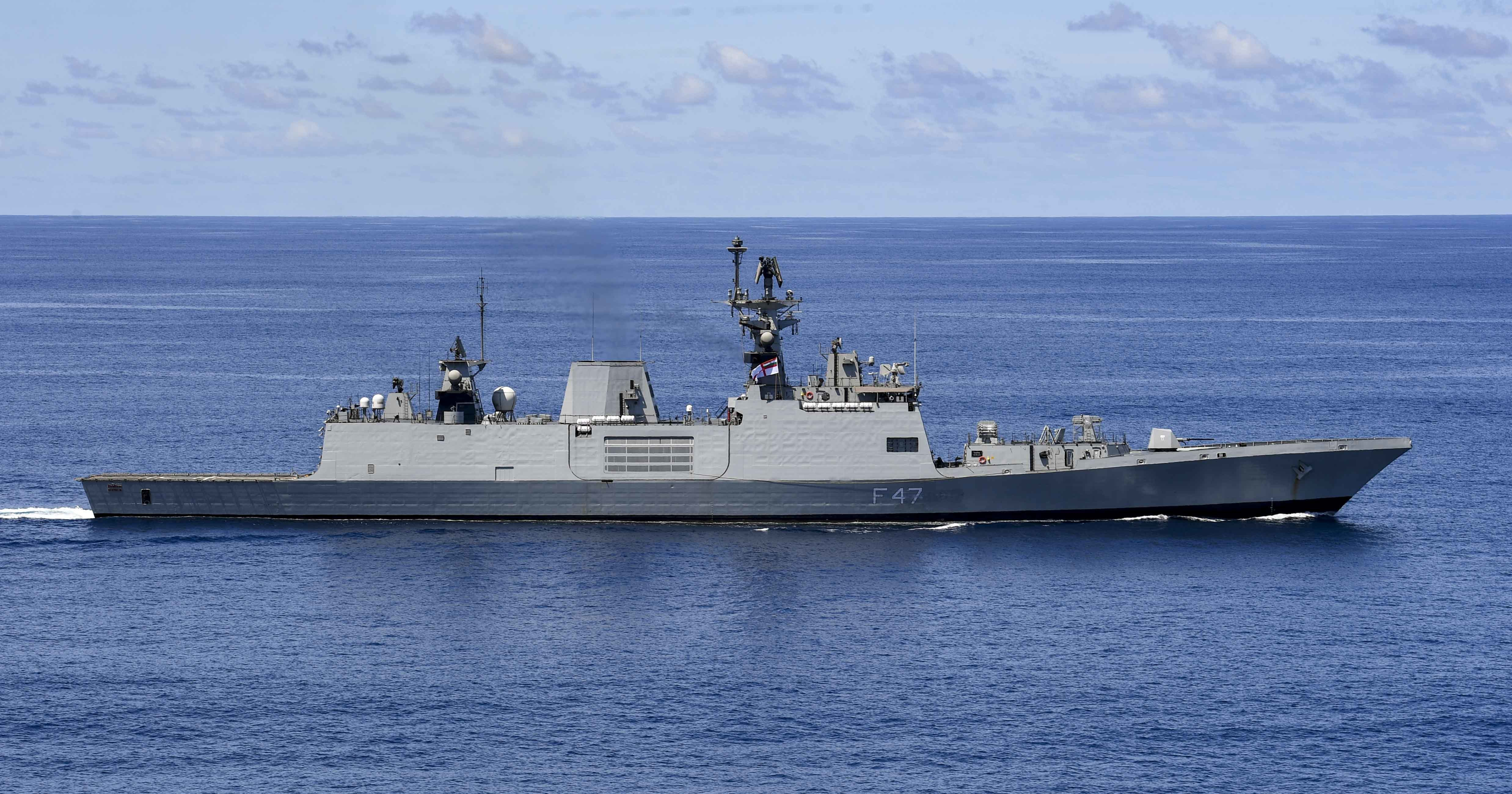
- INS Shivalik (F47) during joint operations with United States Navy.

History

India
- Name: Shivalik
- Namesake: Shivalik Hills
- Ordered: 1999
- Builder: Mazagon Dock Limited
- Laid down: 11 July 2001
- Launched: 18 April 2003
- Commissioned: 29 April 2010
- Identification: F47
- Status: Active
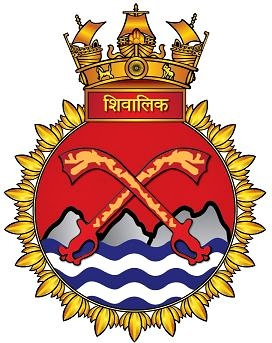
- Badge

General characteristics
- Class & type: Shivalik-class guided-missile frigate
- Displacement: 6,200 t (6,100 long tons; 6,800 short tons) full load; 5,300 t (5,200 long tons; 5,800 short tons) standard
- Length: 142.5 m (468 ft)
- Beam: 16.9 m (55 ft)
- Draught: 4.5 m (15 ft)
- Installed power: 2 × Pielstick 16 PA6 STC Diesel engines (11,300 kW each); 2 × GE LM2500+ (25,100 kW each)
- Propulsion: CODOG
- Speed: 32 knots (59 km/h; 37 mph); 22 knots (41 km/h; 25 mph) (diesel engines)
- Complement: 257 (including 35 officers + 222 sailors)
- Sensors & processing systems: Radar :-; 1 x Fregat M2EM 3-D radar (Surface & Air); 4 × MR-90 Orekh radar; 1 × Elta EL/M-2238 STAR; 2 × Elta EL/M 2221 STGR; 1 × BEL APARNA; Sonar :-; BEL HUMSA-NG active/passive sonar; Thales Sintra active towed-array sonar; Combat Suite :-; "Combat Management System" (CMS-17A)
- Electronic warfare & decoys: BEL Ellora electronic warfare suite; Decoy:-; 4 x Kavach decoy launchers
- Armament: Anti-air missiles: 1 × Shtil-1 single-arm surface-to-air missile launcher (24 missiles); 32-cell VLS for Barak 1 point-defence surface-to-air missiles; Anti-ship/Land-attack missiles: 8 × VLS launched BrahMos, anti-ship and land-attack cruise missiles; Guns: 1 × OTO Melara 76 mm naval gun; 2 × AK-630 CIWS; 2 x OFT 12.7 mm M2 Stabilized Remote Controlled Gun; Anti-submarine warfare: 2 × 2 DTA-53-956 torpedo launchers; 2 × RBU-6000 (RPK-8) rocket launchers
- Aircraft carried: 2 × HAL Dhruv or Sea King Mk. 42B helicopters.
- Aviation facilities: Enclosed helicopter hangar and flight deck capable of accommodating two multi-role helicopters.

INS Shivalik (F47) is the lead ship of her class of stealth multi-role frigates built for the Indian Navy. She is the first stealth warship built by India. She was built at the Mazagon Dock Limited (MDL) located in Mumbai. Construction of the vessel began in 2001 and was completed by 2009. She underwent sea trials from thereon before being commissioned on 29 April 2010.

Shivalik features improved stealth and land attacking features over the preceding Talwar-class frigates. She is also the first Indian navy ship to use the CODOG (COmbined Diesel Or Gas) propulsion system.

== Design and description ==
The Shivalik-class frigates were conceived as part of the Indian Navy's Project 17, which set down the requirements for a class of stealthy frigates to be designed and built in India. The Directorate of Naval Design (DND)'s design specifications for the Shivalik class called for "5000 ton stealth frigates (Project 17) incorporating advanced signature suppression and signature management features". The first three units were formally ordered by the Indian Navy in early 1999.

=== General characteristics and propulsion ===
INS Shivalik has a length of 142.5 m (468 ft) overall, a beam of 16.9 m (55 ft) and a draft of 4.5 m (15 ft). The ships displaces about 5,300 t (5,200 long tons; 5,800 short tons) at standard load and 6,200 tonnes (6,100 long tons; 6,800 short tons) at full load. The complement is about 257, including 37 officers.

The ship uses two 7,600 shp (5,700 kW) Pielstick 16 PA6 STC diesel engines, for cruising, or two 16,800 shp (12,500 kW) GE LM2500+ gas turbines, for high speed bursts, in CODOG configuration. The diesels allow the ship to reach a maximum speed of 22 kn (41 km/h; 25 mph) while the gas turbines allow of a maximum speed of 32 kn (59 km/h; 37 mph).

=== Electronics and sensors ===
INS Shivalik is equipped with a wide range of electronics and sensors. These include:

- 1 × MR-760 Fregat M2EM 3-D radar
- 4 × MR-90 Orekh radars
- 1 × Elta EL/M-2238 STAR
- 2 × Elta EL/M-2221 STGR
- 1 × BEL APARNA

In addition, it uses HUMSA (hull-mounted sonar array), ATAS/Thales Sintra towed array systems and the BEL Ajanta Electronic Warfare suite.

=== Armament ===
INS Shivalik is equipped with a mix of Russian, Indian and Western weapon systems. These include the 76 mm (3 in) Otobreda naval gun, Klub and BrahMos supersonic anti-ship missiles, Shtil-1 anti-aircraft missiles, RBU-6000 anti-submarine rocket launchers and DTA-53-956 torpedo launchers. A 32 cell VLS launched Barak SAM and AK-630 act as Close-in weapon systems(CIWS). The ship also carries two HAL Dhruv or Sea King Mk. 42B helicopters.

== Construction and service ==
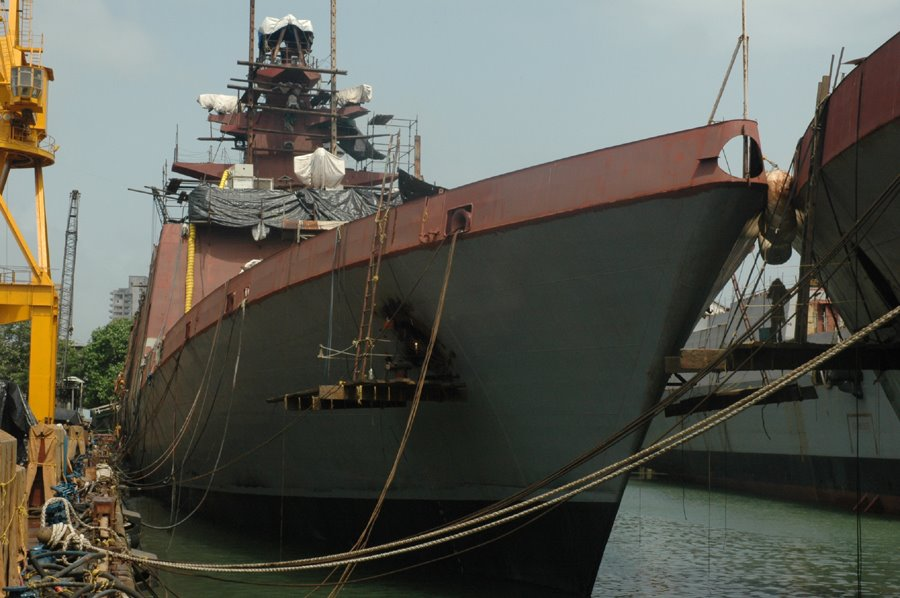
INS Shivalik during construction.

The construction of INS Shivalik began in 2000. Her keel was laid in July 2001. She was launched in June 2004 and was originally planned for commission by 2005 However, she was commissioned in April 2010.

=== Operational history ===
In 2012, INS Shivalik was deployed in the North West Pacific for JIMEX 2012 (Japan-India Maritime Exercise) with a four-ship group which included INS Rana, a Rajput-class guided missile destroyer, INS Shakti, a Deepak-class fleet tanker, and INS Karmuk, a Kora-class corvette and took part in India's first bi-lateral maritime exercise with Japan. The Japanese Maritime Self Defence Force (JMSDF) was represented by two destroyers, one maritime patrol aircraft and a helicopter.

The four ships entered Tokyo on 5 June 2012 after visiting Singapore, Vietnam, Philippines and Republic of Korea. They stayed in Tokyo for three days. This visit coincided with commemoration of 60 years of diplomatic relations between India and Japan. Vice Admiral Anil Chopra, Flag Officer Commanding-in-Chief Eastern Naval Command, also visited Tokyo to witness the first JIMEX.

After the deployment in the north Pacific, the battle group was deployed in the South China Sea. As part of India's Look East policy, the ships visited the Shanghai port on 13 June 2012, for a five-day goodwill tour. INS Shakti served as the fuel and logistics tanker to the three destroyers. The ships left the port on 17 June 2012. Before leaving the port, the ships conducted a routine passage exercise with the People's Liberation Army Navy.

After the visits to Singapore, Vietnam, Philippines, Japan, South Korea and China, the ships visited Port Klang, Malaysia. This was the battle group's last port call during its two-month-long deployment, which had started in May 2012. After this she returned to the Eastern Fleet of the Indian Navy and since has been docked there.

INS Shivalik participated in the People's Liberation Army Navy's (PLAN) 65th anniversary celebrations held in Qingdao. India, Indonesia and China conducted three high level exercises including anti-hijack exercise. PLAN official who visited the ship mentioned that "The Indian ship is a very strong ship with powerful weapons," and "This gives us a good opportunity to see the Indian Navy". INS Shivalik sailed 4,500 nmi (8,300 km; 5,200 mi) from Port Blair to Qingdao, without being assisted by any support vessel and without official from headquarters, showcasing the confidence of the crew and the autonomy they enjoy. PLAN and Indian Navy decided to further deepen the Naval bond between the two nations.

In July 2014, this indigenous stealth frigate actively participated in INDRA War Games, a naval and army counter-terrorism exercise, with Russia. There Rajput-class destroyer INS Ranvijay and fleet tanker INS Shakti were also part of Indian fleet accompanying her.

Shivalik participated in the International Fleet Review 2022.

On 21 February 2024, responding to the distress call from the Iranian fishing vessel FV Al Arifi, the Indian Naval ship INS Shivalik Mission, deployed in the Gulf of Aden, rendered medical assistance including critical medical supplies to the 18 Pakistani crew onboard.

In 2024, INS Shivalik was deployed to South China Sea and Northern Pacific Ocean region. As a part of the deployment the ship visited Changi Naval Base, Singapore from where the ship departed on 30 May 2024. The visit to Singapore also included onboard and cross-deck visits to USS Mobile (an Independence-class LCS). The ship is then scheduled to reach Yokosuka, Japan to participate in JIMEX 24 naval exercise and then participate in RIMPAC 24 with US Navy and other navies.

INS Shivalik participated in JIMEX 24 exercise along with JS Yūgiri of Japan Maritime Self-Defense Force from 11 June 2024. Later, the ship also participated in RIMPAC 2024, the harbour phase of which is scheduled from 27 June to 7 July. In the sea phase will see a theatre level large force tactical exercise. INS Shivalik was also accompanied by Indian Navy's Boeing P-8I Neptune aircraft. INS Shivalik has won the Naval Gunfire Support Competition at RIMPAC and has secured the RODEO trophy which shows the efficient firepower and precision of the ships armaments.

After the RIMPAC Exercise, the ship reached Guam on 16 August 2024. The ship also participated in the 31st edition of Singapore India Maritime Bilateral Exercise (SIMBEX) whose Harbour and Sea phase was conducted from 23 to 25 October 2024 and from 28 to 29 October 2024 at Visakhapatnam. Singapore Navy's RSS Tenacious was also a part of the exercise. The ship also hosted the opening ceremony of the exercise.
