= INS Shankul =

Indian diesel-electric submarine

History

History

India
- Name: INS Shankul
- Builder: Mazagon Dock Limited
- Launched: 21 March 1992
- Commissioned: 28 May 1994
- Status: Active

General characteristics
- Class & type: Shishumar-class submarine
- Displacement: 1450 tons surfaced; 1850 tons submerged
- Length: 64.4 m (211 ft)
- Beam: 6.5 m (21 ft)
- Draught: 6 m (20 ft)
- Propulsion: 4 × 2,400 hp (1,800 kW) diesel-electric motors; 1 × Siemens 4,600 hp (3,400 kW) motor; 4 × 1.8 MW (2,400 hp) Siemens alternators; 1 shaft
- Speed: Surfaced 11 knots (20 km/h); Submerged 22 knots (41 km/h)
- Range: Snorting 8,000 nautical miles (15,000 km) at 8 kn (15 km/h)
- Test depth: Test depth 260 m (850 ft)
- Complement: 40 (incl 8 officers)
- Armament: 14 × AEG-SUT Mod 1 wire-guided active/passive torpedoes; 24 × external strap-on mines

INS Shankul (S47) (lit. 'Skate Fish') is a Shishumar-class diesel-electric submarine of the Indian Navy. The submarine was the second to be built in India. She participated in the International Fleet Review 2026 held in Visakapatanam.
