= Commissioner of Police (Mauritius) =

Top-ranking police officer of the Mauritius Police Force

Commissioner of The Mauritius Police Force
- Incumbent; Rampersad "Ravin" Sooroojebally since 15 November 2024
- Mauritius Police Force
- Type: Commissioner of Police
- Abbreviation: CP
- Reports to: Prime Minister of Mauritius
- Seat: Line Barracks, Port Louis
- Appointer: The president Mauritius Cabinet of Ministers
- Constituting instrument: Police Act 1974
- Formation: 1794
- First holder: Antoine Codere
- Deputy: Deputy Commissioner of Police

The commissioner of police (abbreviation: CP) is the top-ranking police officer of the Mauritius Police Force. He is assisted by various deputy commissioners of police. The CP reports to the Home Affairs Division of the Prime Minister's Office.

== Commissioner of Police ==
- Jacques Ribet (1968-1973)
- Albert Jupin de Fondaumière (1971-1973)
- Jugmohunsing Fulena (1973-1977)
- Atwaroosingh Rajarai (1977-1983)
- Bardwaz Juggernauth (1983-1986)
- Bhimsen Kowlessur (1986-1991)
- Cyril Morvan (20 December 1991- Sacked in 1994)
- Raj Dayal (1 September 1994 - Suspended 23 November 1997 and removed from office in January 2000)
- André Feillafé (31 January 2000 – 20 October 2000)
- Ramanooj Gopalsingh (2000-13 July 2008)
- Dhun Iswur Rampersad (13 July 2008 – 20 March 2015)
- Mario Nobin (20 March 2015 – 2 June 2020)
- Khemraj Servansingh (3 June 2020 – 2 August 2021)
- Anil Kumar Dip GOSK (3 August 2021 – 12 November 2024)
- Rampersad Sooroojebally "Ravin" (15 November 2024 – present)

== Scandals ==
Anil Kumar Dip and death of Jacquelin Juliette The DPP's office announced the launch of a judicial inquiry on Anil Kumar Dip and Sudesh Kumar Gungadin in 2025. Two recordings, broadcast by Missie Moustass, pointed to a possible high-level cover-up to conceal the circumstances surrounding the death of Jacquelin Juliette, which occurred in January 2023.

Jacquelin Juliette, a 30-year-old man, is believed to have been brutalized during a raid by the ADSU (Anti-Drug and Smuggling Unit) in Cité Ste-Claire.

In two recordings leaked by "Mister Moustache", a voice, attributed to the former Police Commissioner, speaking to Dr. Gungadin, as well as a conversation with Superintendent Jagai, suggests that there may have been a conspiracy to suppress the case.

Following the broadcast of these recordings, the DPP's office announced the launch of a judicial inquiry.

Anil Kumar Dip and Lavierge Marie One of the recordings relates to a conversation he allegedly had with a third party. He is accused of having made remarks with communal overtones and blasphemous content, particularly directed at the Virgin Mary. Mr Anil Kumar Dip was angry that carpenters of Catholic origin could not come to do masonry works at his house as they were celebrating the Assumption of Virgin Mary. Anil Kumar Dip replied by saying "Ask Virgin Mary to hold my candle". Despite the criticism and constant calls for his resignation, Anil Kumar Dip remained firmly supported by former Prime Minister Pravind Jugnauth—at least until the change in government.This prompted the Diocese of Port-Louis to organize a Mass of Reparation.

Anil Kumar Dip and his son Chandra Prakashsing Dip fraud case Chandra Prakashsing Dip, the son of former Police Commissioner Anil Kumar Dip, is accused of having received sums of money from the company Yeschem Ltd. On Thursday, April 10, 2025, a representative from the Registrar of Companies confirmed before the Financial Crimes Division (FCD) that it was Chandni Dip — his mother and the wife of the former Commissioner of Police—who had incorporated the company and served as its director from January 19, 2010, to March 25, 2011. Muhammad Saif Ullah Maulaboksh later took over as director. He is currently being prosecuted in the case.

Chandra Prakashsing Dip is facing fifteen charges of money laundering. It is alleged that between March 30 and August 17, 2011, he received checks ranging from Rs 30,000 to Rs 345,000 from Yeschem Ltd, totaling Rs 1,415,000. He is also accused of having received a total of Rs 3.5 million on April 1 and April 8, 2011—money that had been credited to the bank account of Yeschem Ltd, and which allegedly originated from electronic fraud to the detriment of the former Bramer Banking Corporation (BBC).
