= French frigate Lorraine =

FREMM class multi-purpose frigates in the French Navy

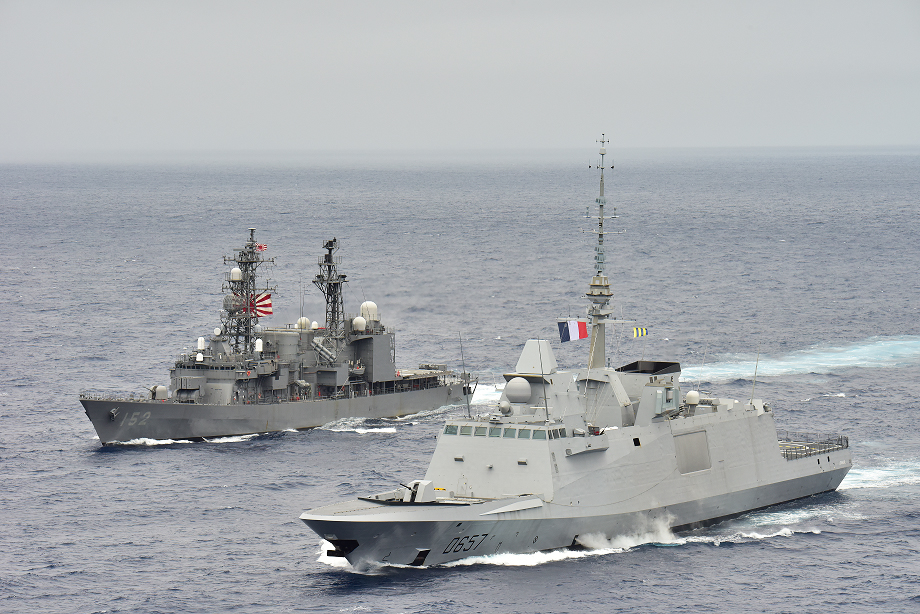
- JS Yamagiri (rear) and Lorraine (foreground) during the Japan-France bilateral exercise OGURI-VERNY 23-2

History

France
- Name: Lorraine
- Namesake: Lorraine
- Ordered: 2008
- Builder: DCNS, Lorient
- Laid down: 15 May 2019
- Launched: 13 November 2020
- Acquired: 16 November 2022
- Commissioned: 13 November 2023
- Home port: Toulon
- Identification: Pennant number: D657
- Status: In active service

General characteristics
- Class & type: Aquitaine-class frigate
- Displacement: 6,000+ tons
- Length: 466 ft (142.0 m)
- Beam: 65 ft (19.8 m)
- Draught: 16 ft (4.9 m)
- Propulsion: MTU Series 4000 (2.2 MW); CODLOG
- Speed: 27 knots (50 km/h; 31 mph); max cruise speed 15.6 knots (28.9 km/h; 18.0 mph)
- Range: 6,000 nmi (11,000 km; 6,900 mi) at 15 knots (28 km/h; 17 mph)
- Complement: 145+
- Sensors & processing systems: Héraklès multi-purpose passive electronically scanned array radar; Thales STIR EO MK 2 fire control radar; CAPTAS-4 towed-array sonar; UMS 4110 CL hull-mounted sonar
- Armament: 1 x 76 mm Super Rapid gun; 3 x 20 mm Narwhal remote weapon systems; 32-cell SYLVER A50 VLS for Aster 15 and Aster 30 air defense missiles; 8 x Exocet MM40 Block 3 anti-ship missiles (Block 3c variant entering service with the French Navy from December 2022); 2 x B-515 twin launchers for MU90 torpedoes
- Aircraft carried: 1 × NH90 helicopter
- Aviation facilities: Single hangar

Lorraine (D657) is an Aquitaine-class frigate of the French Navy which were developed through the FREMM multipurpose frigate program. She is the second of two air-defence variants of the class known as FREMM DA (Frégate Européenne Multimissions de Défense Aérienne) in the program.

== Development and design ==
Original plans were for 17 FREMM hulls to replace the nine D'Estienne d'Orves-class avisos and nine anti-submarine (ASW) frigates of the Tourville and Georges Leygues classes. In November 2005, France announced a contract of €3.5 billion for development and the first eight hulls, with options for nine more costing €2.95 billion split over two tranches (totaling 17).

Following the cancellation of the third and fourth of the Horizon-class frigates in 2005 on budget grounds, requirements for an air-defence derivative of the FREMM called FREDA were placed – with DCNS coming up with several proposals. Expectations were that the last two ships of the 17 FREMM planned would be built to FREDA specifications; however, by 2008 the plan was revised down to just 11 FREMM (9 ASW variants and 2 FREDA variants) at a cost of €8.75 billion (FY13, ~US$12 billion). The 11 ships would cost €670 million (~US$760m) each in FY2014, or €860m (~US$980m) including development costs. Subsequently, the class was further reduced to a total of eight ships, though both air defence variants were retained.

Lorraine is the second of two FREMM frigates built to FREDA specifications, alongside Alsace. Lorraine and her sister ship retain most of the armaments and sensors of their ASW sister ships within the FREMM class. However, the ships have enhancements related to air defence including a more powerful Thales Herakles multi-function radar with more transmitter modules and additional wave-forms and search modes for long range air defence. Additional communications systems, consoles in the combat information centre and berthings for additional personnel are also integrated into the ship. A reinforced bridge structure is incorporated to accommodate the enhanced weight of these systems. The ships also incorporate Sylver A50 vertical launch systems permitting them to carry both MBDA Aster 15 and/or 30 surface-to-air missiles. On the two AAW variants, the Sylver A70 launch systems (used for land-attack cruise missiles on the ASW variants) are removed to provide space for fitting double the number of A50 cells for Aster SAMs.

== Construction and career ==
Lorraine was developed as part of a joint Italian-French program known as FREMM, which was implemented to develop a new class of frigates for use by various European navies. Formally laid down in 2019, the frigate Lorraine was launched at the Lorient shipyard on 13 November 2020. She began sea trials in February 2022 and was delivered to the French Navy on 16 November 2022. In late 2022 she began a period of testing and exercises prior to being accepted into full operational service.

In March 2023, on exercises, the frigate was reported to have successfully launched an Aster-30 air defence missile. In April 2023, but still prior to her full acceptance into active service, Lorraine began a long-term deployment to the Pacific region. Later in the month, the frigate was tasked to participate in the evacuation of French and allied nationals from Sudan. For that mission, the ship reportedly embarked a French Army Puma helicopter, taken aboard at Djibouti. In June, the frigate engaged in a series of exercises with vessels of the Japanese Maritime Self Defense Force, including the destroyer Yamagiri, the frigate Kumano and the submarine Taigei. In the same month, she also integrated with the USS Ronald Reagan carrier battle group for fifteen days.

The ship was formally commissioned on 13 November 2023.
