= Marine Corps Key Volunteer Network =

The Key Volunteer Network (KVN) was an official United States Marine Corps family readiness program. The network consists of Marine spouses called Key Volunteers and they serve in both active duty and reserve units. KVs receive formal training either from classes on base or online and are appointed by the unit Commander.

The KVN structure includes a Key Volunteer Advisor (KVA) who is usually the Commanding Officer's spouse (or spouse of another senior officer), a Key Volunteer Coordinator (KVC) who is the Executive Officer's spouse (or spouse of another senior officer) as well as a number of additional Key Volunteers (KV) who are spouses of other Marines within the unit.

The Commanding Officers (CO) of individual active duty units rely on the KVN to provide additional support and resource referrals to the Marine families of that unit. Reserve units also utilize the KVN. However, if a unit is widely geographically dispersed, the CO may appoint a parent to serve as a KV or KVC that are local often have insight into resources and assistance that are available and helpful to unit families.

The goal of the KVN is to help families achieve and maintain family readiness. This means that they communicate official command information as directed, serve as a communication link between the command and families, and provide information to Marine families through resource referrals as needed. During deployments, the KVN is especially important because they are further utilized as a communications tool to keep families of Marines better informed about mission(s) and tasks of individual units. The Marine Corps believes that if Marines feel their families are supported and taken care of, they are better able to perform efficiently, effectively and safely.
