= Mauritius Police Force =

National law enforcement agency of Mauritius

Mauritius Police Force Police Mauricienne (French)
- Mauritius Police Force emblem

Agency overview
- Formed: 1 August 1767
- Annual budget: ₨ 19.7 billion

Jurisdictional structure
- National agency: Mauritius
- Operations jurisdiction: Mauritius
- Area: 2,040 km^{2}
- Constituting instrument: Police Act 1974
- General nature: Civilian police

Operational structure
- Headquarters: Line Barracks, Port Louis
- Sworn members: 12,475 (2013)
- Elected officer responsible: Navinchandra Ramgoolam, Prime Minister of Mauritius
- Agency executive: Commissioner of Police, Rampersad Sooroojebally
- Divisions: 8: Central Division; Eastern Division; Metropolitan Division (North); Metropolitan Division (South); Northern Division; Rodrigues Division; Southern Division; Western Division

Website
- police.govmu.org

The Mauritius Police Force (MPF) is the national law enforcement agency of Mauritius. The MPF carries out police, security, and military functions on Mauritius, with about 12,500 police officers under the command of the Commissioner of Police (CP). The MPF is part of the Home Affairs Division, which operates under the aegis of the Prime Minister's Office.

Military advisers from India and the United Kingdom work with the Special Mobile Force, the National Coast Guard, and the Police Helicopter Squadron, and Mauritian police officers are trained in India, the United Kingdom, and France. India and the United States provide training to National Coast Guard officers in such fields as seamanship and maritime law enforcement.

== Branches ==
=== Anti Drug and Smuggling Unit ===
The Anti Drug and Smuggling Unit (ADSU) is the narcotics and anti-smuggling unit of the MPF. It is responsible for preventing smuggling and illegal drug distribution in Mauritius and the Outer Islands.

=== Police Bike Patrol Unit ===
The Police Bike Patrol Unit is the police bicycle unit of the MPF. It is primarily responsible for conducting patrols on bicycles with the goals of community policing, providing greater police presence, and patrolling areas not accessible to police vehicles.

=== Anti Robbery Squad ===
The Anti Robbery Squad (ARS), nicknamed the "Rottweilers", was a dedicated unit of the MPF tasked with combatting robbery crimes and supporting the Criminal Investigation Division. It was established in 2015 by then-CP Mario Nobin to replace the defunct Rottweilers SSU.

In 2017, CP Nobin appointed Inspector Seewoo, reported to be a close associate of Nobin, to head the ARS; in 2020, he was promoted to Chief Inspector, causing controversy due to "alleged irregularities" in his promotion. In 2020, CP Khemraj Servansingh transferred Seewoo to the Pointe-aux-Cannonniers police station and dismantled the ARS.

=== National Coast Guard ===
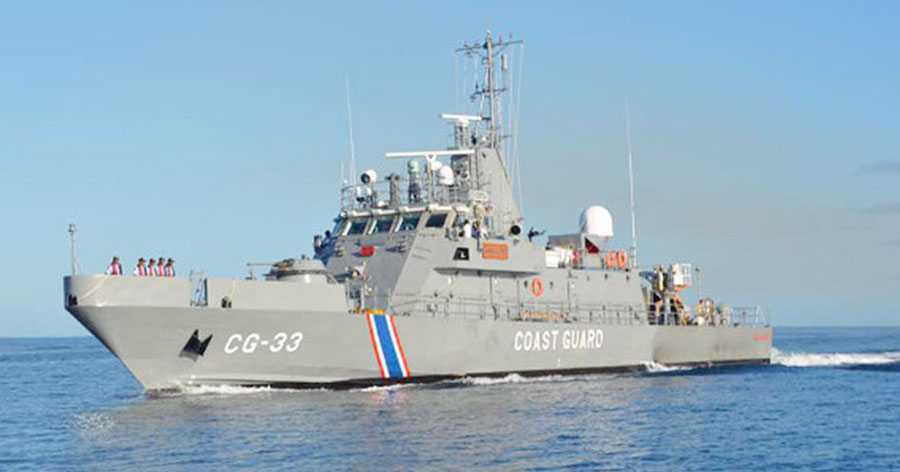
MCGS Valiant arriving in Port Louis

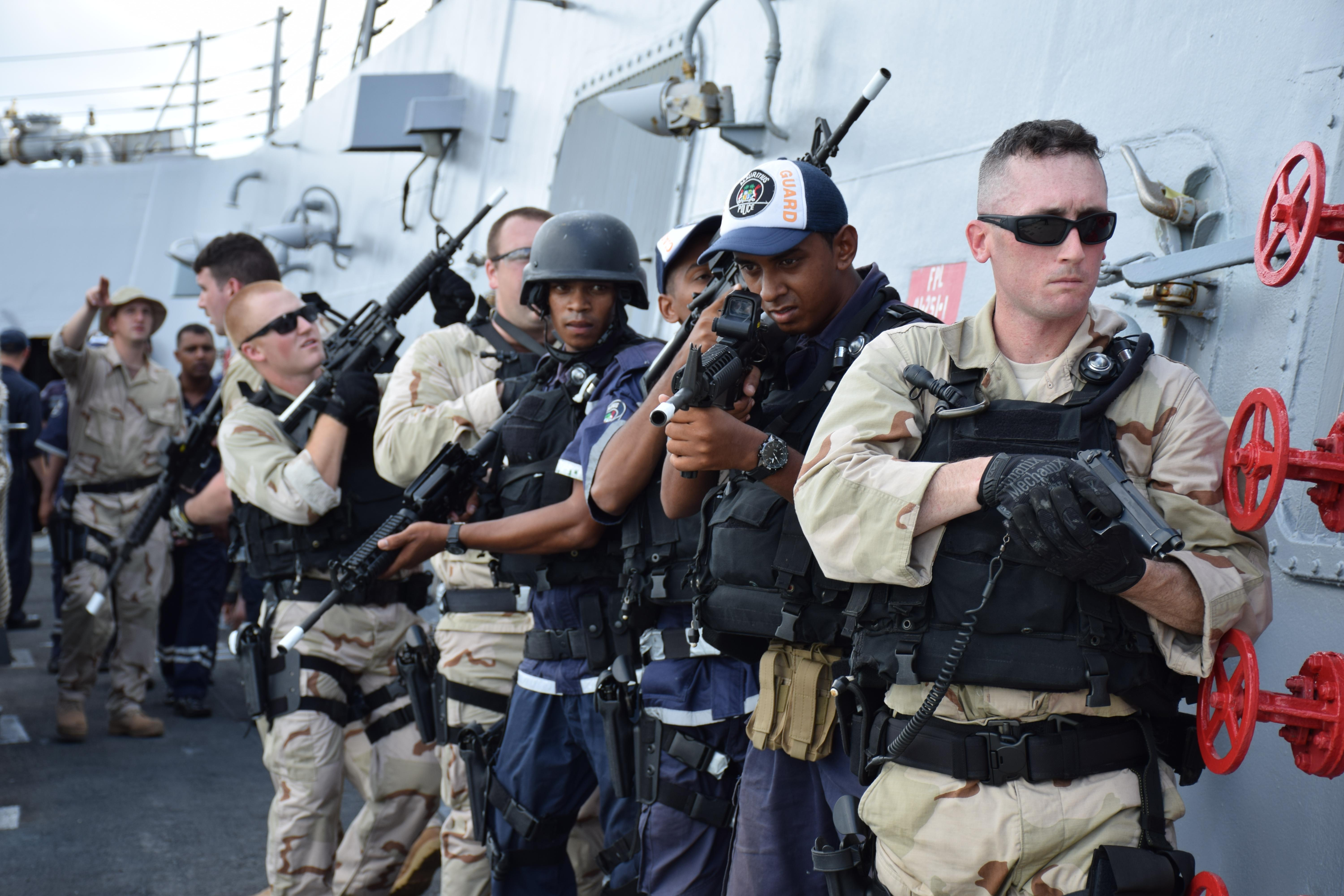
United States Navy sailors training Mauritius coast guardsmen (in the center, dressed in blue) in 2015.

The National Coast Guard (NCG) is the coast guard of Mauritius. It was established in 1988 and consists of No. 1 Patrol Vessel Squadron and the Maritime Air Squadron.

The NCG has been modernising its fleet introducing a Kora-class Offshore Patrol Vessel CGS Barracuda in 2015, two Sarojini Naidu-class patrol vessels CGS Victory in 2016 and CGS Valiant in 2017 and ten 14.5m GSL Fast Interceptor Boats in 2016.

The Maritime Air Squadron (MAS) was established in 1990 and operates a fixed wing fleet of three HAL Dornier 228 and one Britten-Norman Defender BN-2T for search-and-rescue missions and surveillance of territorial waters. The Defender entered service in 1992, the first Dornier 228 entered service in 1990, the second in 2004 and third in 2016. The Do 288 can be fitted with 7.62mm gun pods.

The NCG has a maritime tactical unit established in 2010 the Commando Unit or Commandos Special Force. The Commando Unit trains with the Indian Navy's MARCOS and the French Army's 2nd Marine Infantry Parachute Regiment (2^{e} RPIMa), based in Réunion as part of FAZSOI.

==== Vessels ====
Naval Ensign of Mauritius

Ship	Origin	Type	In service	Class	Notes
CGS Barracuda	India	Patrol boat	1	Kora-class corvette	
CGS Valiant	India	Patrol boat	2	Sarojini Naidu-class patrol vessel	
CGS Victory	India	Patrol boat	2	Sarojini Naidu-class patrol vessel	
CGS Guardian	India	Patrol boat	1	Seaward-class patrol vessel	
CGS Observer	India		1	AMPL (P-2000)-class interceptor boat	

==== Aircraft ====
Roundel of Mauritius

In March 1990, one radar equipped HAL Dornier 228 was ordered from India to form a maritime surveillance element by July 1991. This aircraft was reinforced in 1992 by a single twin turbo prop BN-2T Maritime Defender for coastal patrol work. A second HAL Dornier 228 was added to the fleet in 2004 and a third in 2016.

Aircraft	Origin	Type	Variant	In service	Notes
Maritime patrol
Dornier 228	India; Germany	maritime patrol		3	
BN-2T Defender	United Kingdom	maritime patrol		1	

=== National Security Service ===
The National Security Service (NSS) is responsible for the national security of Mauritius. It was formerly known as the National Intelligence Unit (NIU) and State Security Service (SSS). During British rule, it was known as the Special Branch. The National Security Advisor is an Indian national.

=== Police Helicopter Squadron ===
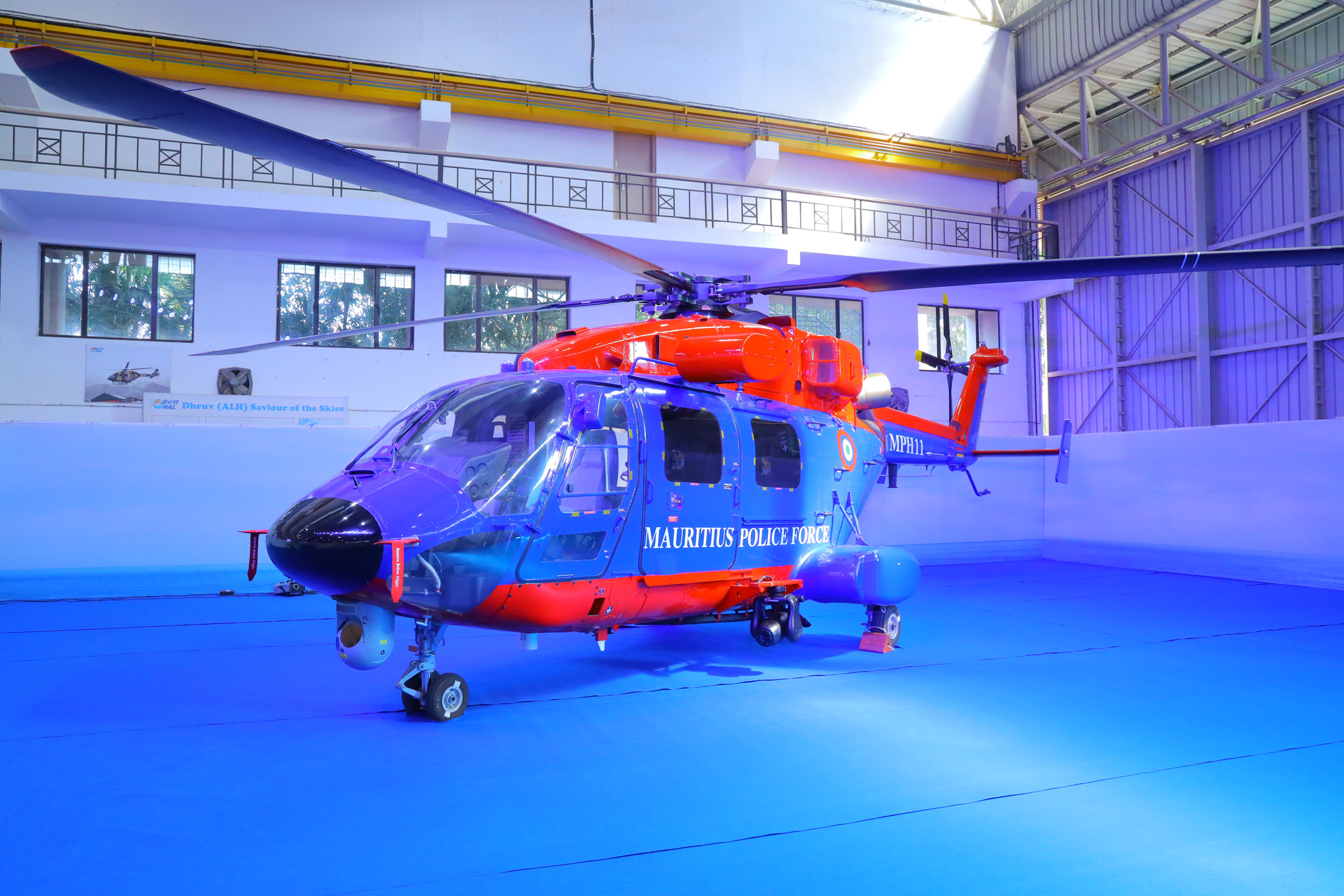
Dhruv MK.3 of Mauritius Police Force

The Police Helicopter Squadron (PHS) is the police aviation unit of the MPF. Established in 1974, its main roles are search and rescue and casualty evacuation both inland and at sea, combatting gandia cultivation, traffic patrols, convoy escorts, and VIP transport.

The helicopter fleet consists of four HAL Chetaks, one Eurocopter Fennec AS555 and three HAL Dhruvs. The Dhruv helicopter entered service in 2009 followed by the MK.3 variant in 2023. Two refurbished Chetak helicopters were gifted by India in 2016.

Aircraft	Origin	Type	Variant	In service	Notes
Helicopter
HAL Dhruv	India	utility	MK.1 and MK.3	3	
HAL Chetak	India	SAR / utility	SA316B	4	
AS555	France	utility	AS555 SN	1	

=== Special Mobile Force ===
The Special Mobile Force (SMF) is the paramilitary force of the MPF and the de facto military of Mauritius. It was established in 1960 following the withdrawal of two companies of the British King's African Rifles. The SMF recruited World War II veterans and select police officers and was led by British commanders until 1978.

The 1,500-member SMF and the 500-member National Coast Guard are the only two paramilitary units in Mauritius. Both units are composed of police officers on lengthy rotations to those services.

The SMF is a motorized infantry battalion with five companies, an engineering squadron, and a mobile wing comprising two squadrons equipped with armored vehicles. The SMF training is based on conventional military tactics focused on internal security. It engages extensively in civic works projects.

The SMF has a police tactical unit established in 1979, the Groupement d’Intervention de la Police Mauricienne (GIPM) (English: Mauritian Police Intervention Group). The GIPM trains with the French National Gendarmerie's Groupe d'intervention de la Gendarmerie nationale (GIGN) and the French Army's 2^{e} RPIMa.

=== Special Support Unit ===
The Special Support Unit (SSU) is the riot police and reserve unit of the MPF. It was established in 1986. The SSU consists of five operational units and a training wing.

=== Police Band ===
The Police Band is the official musical group of the MPF. It can operate as a military band, a marching band, a string orchestra, and a contemporary pop group. One of its alumni was Joseph Philippe Gentil, a composer best known for composing Motherland, the national anthem of Mauritius. On Independence Day 1968, a national newspaper mistakenly published the name and photograph of Philippe Oh San (the Police Band's maestro at the time) as the anthem's composer, with the remaining newspapers being reprinted with the correction.

== Ranks ==
Mauritius Police Ranks and Insignia
Rank	Commissioner	Deputy Commissioner	Assistant Commissioner	Superintendent	Assistant Superintendent	Deputy Assistant Superintendent
Epaulette Insignia						
Rank	Chief Inspector	Inspector	Cadet Officer	Sergeant	Corporal	Constable
Epaulette Insignia						

== Small arms ==
Name	Origin	Type	Variant	Notes
Glock 17	Austria	Semi-automatic pistol		
FN P90	Belgium	Personal defense weapon		
M16	United States	Assault rifle	M16A2	
SIG SG 550	Switzerland	Assault rifle		
Heckler & Koch G36	Germany	Assault rifle		
Heckler & Koch MP5	Germany	Submachine gun		
FN FAL	Belgium	Battle rifle		
FN MAG	Belgium	Machine gun		
FN SCAR	Belgium	Assault rifle	SCAR-L	
CZ Scorpion Evo 3	Czech Republic	Carbine		

== See also ==
- GRSE Mauritius offshore patrol vessel
- Mandovi Marine (15 meter)-class patrol craft
- Praga-class patrol boat
