= Operation Sagittaire =

2023 French evacuation from Sudan

- Type: Non-combatant evacuation operation
- Location: Sudan
- Planned by: France
- Date: 22–28 April 2023
- Executed by: French Air and Space Force; French Navy; Special Operations Command (France); French forces in Djibouti; French Armed Forces Health Service; GIGN; Crisis and support center (France)
- Outcome: 1017 civilians from 84 countries evacuated (225 French)
- Casualties: 1 French special forces soldier injured

Operation Sagittaire was a French non-combatant evacuation operation from 22 to 28 April 2023 in Sudan.

== Background ==
On 15 April 2023, the paramilitary Rapid Support Forces led by Mohamed Hamdan Dagalo attempted to overthrow the junta Sudanese Armed Forces of Abdel Fattah al-Burhan. Heavy fighting broke out in Khartoum and other cities.

Other countries also decided to evacuate their civilians.

=== Order of battle ===
The Crisis and support center and Chief of the Defence Staff commanded the operation. Hundreds of French soldiers were mobilized from the Special Operations Command, GIGN, Crisis and support center, French forces in Djibouti, 5th Overseas Interarms Regiment. These included escort, logistics, and medical branches. The European Air Transport Command was also involved.

Evacuees would be transported by French Air and Space Force aircraft and a French Navy frigate, and assemble at Wadi Seidna Air Base.

== Operation ==
Evacuation by the EU Civil Protection Mechanism

Evacuation by the Ministry for Europe and Foreign Affairs and Ministry of Armed Forces

From 17 April, following the worsening security situation, France started planning an evacuation. The options were air and the 800+ km Khartoum – Port Sudan road. The air option was chosen after general Burhan authorized the use of Wadi Seidna Air Base, near Khartoum.

=== Air ===
The operation started on 18 April with the stationing in Djibouti of three A400Ms, one C130H, a refueling A330 MRTT, 30 tonnes of equipment, vehicles, et 150 soldiers. Chad and Metropolitan France were on alert, two A330s being mobilized.

On the night of 22–23 April, the operation officially started when the special forces C130H took off, followed by three A400Ms to Wadi Seidna. The next night, two planes returned to Djibouti with about 200 civilians, including European Union diplomats. On 24 April, five A400M and two C130H flights evacuated about 300 more, ending the air phase. Command of the air base was left to Germany.

On the night of 27–28 April, a C130 and two A400Ms left Djibouti with 32 soldiers to secure El Fasher Airport and evacuate around 100 non-governmental organization staff.

=== Land and sea ===
About ten buses ran from assembly points to Wadi Seidna. On 23 April, the French embassy – Khartoum convoy came under fire, both warring parties blaming each other. In the morning, a French special forces soldier was injured by a shot in the abdomen, before being stabilized by two Armed Forces Health Service surgeons deployed the day prior.

On 25 April, French frigate Lorraine, during long-term Red Sea deployment before active service, as requested by France and the United Nations, took hundreds of UN employees and their families from Port Sudan to Saudi Arabia. On 26 April, Lorraine arrived in Djeddah with 398 people, ending the naval phase.

== Result ==
Operation Sagittaire occurred in two phases:

- The air phase from 22 to 24 April evacuated 538 (209 French) across 9 flights between Djibouti and Khartoum. Another flight between Darfur and Chad evacuated about 100 UN and NGO staff.
- The naval phase from 25 to 26 April evacuated 398 (5 French) between Port Sudan and Jeddah.

In total, strategically deployed forces evacuated 1017 civilians from 84 countries (225 French). About 40 countries thanked France for evacuating their diplomatic staff and citizens.
