= Police commissioner =

Chief manager of a police entity

A police commissioner is the head of a police department, responsible for overseeing its operations and ensuring the effective enforcement of laws and maintenance of public order. They develop and implement policies, manage budgets, and coordinate with other law enforcement agencies and community groups. Additionally, the commissioner handles high-profile cases, addresses public concerns, and represents the department in various forums.

== Rank insignia ==
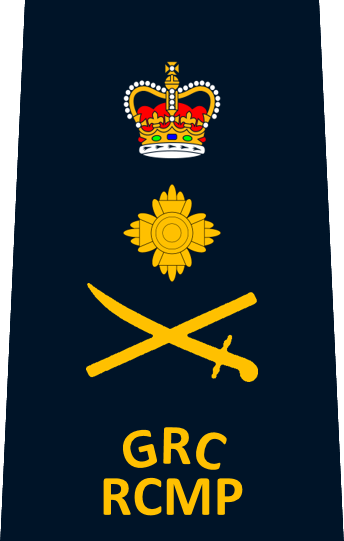
Royal Canadian Mounted Police

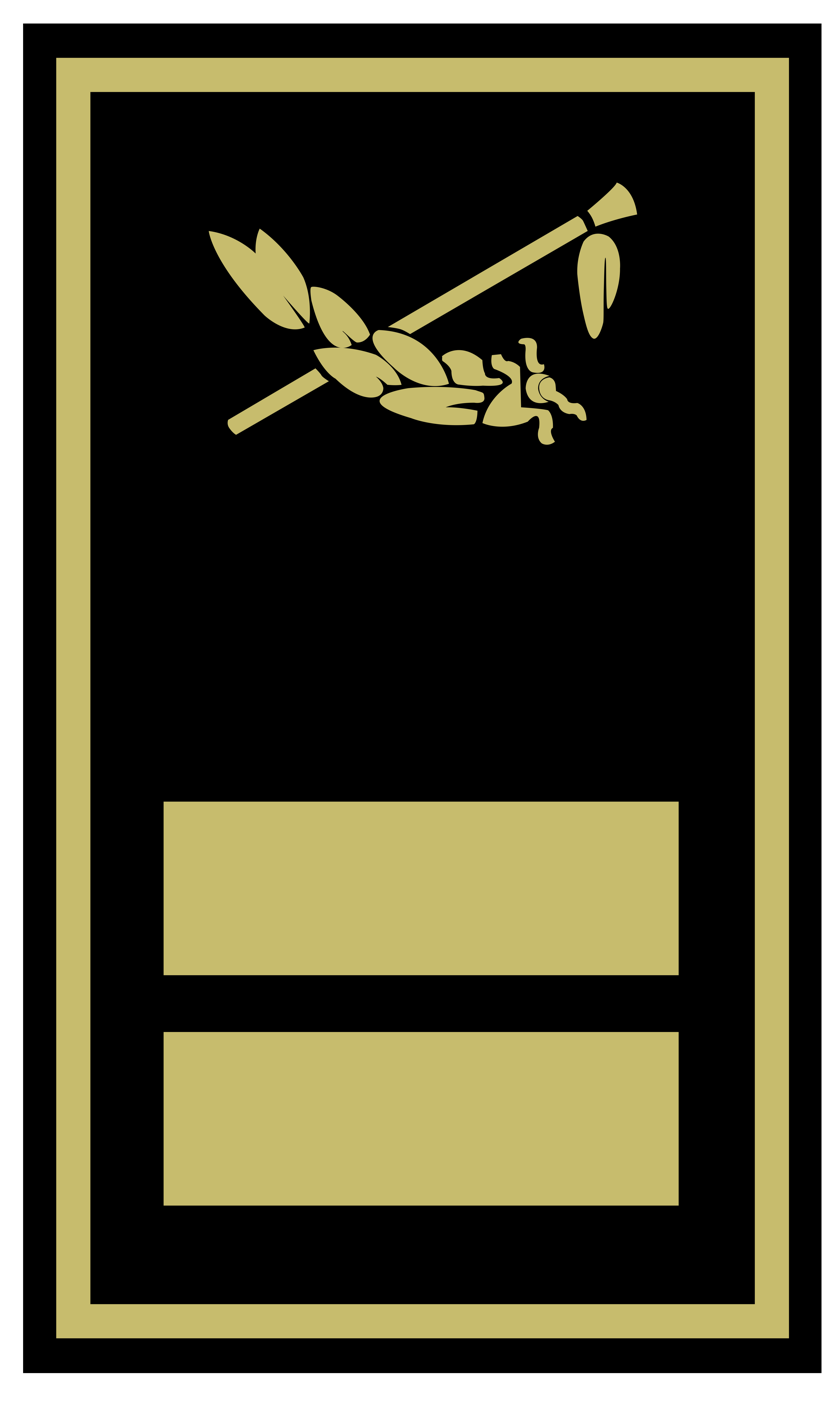
Catalonia Police

New Zealand Police

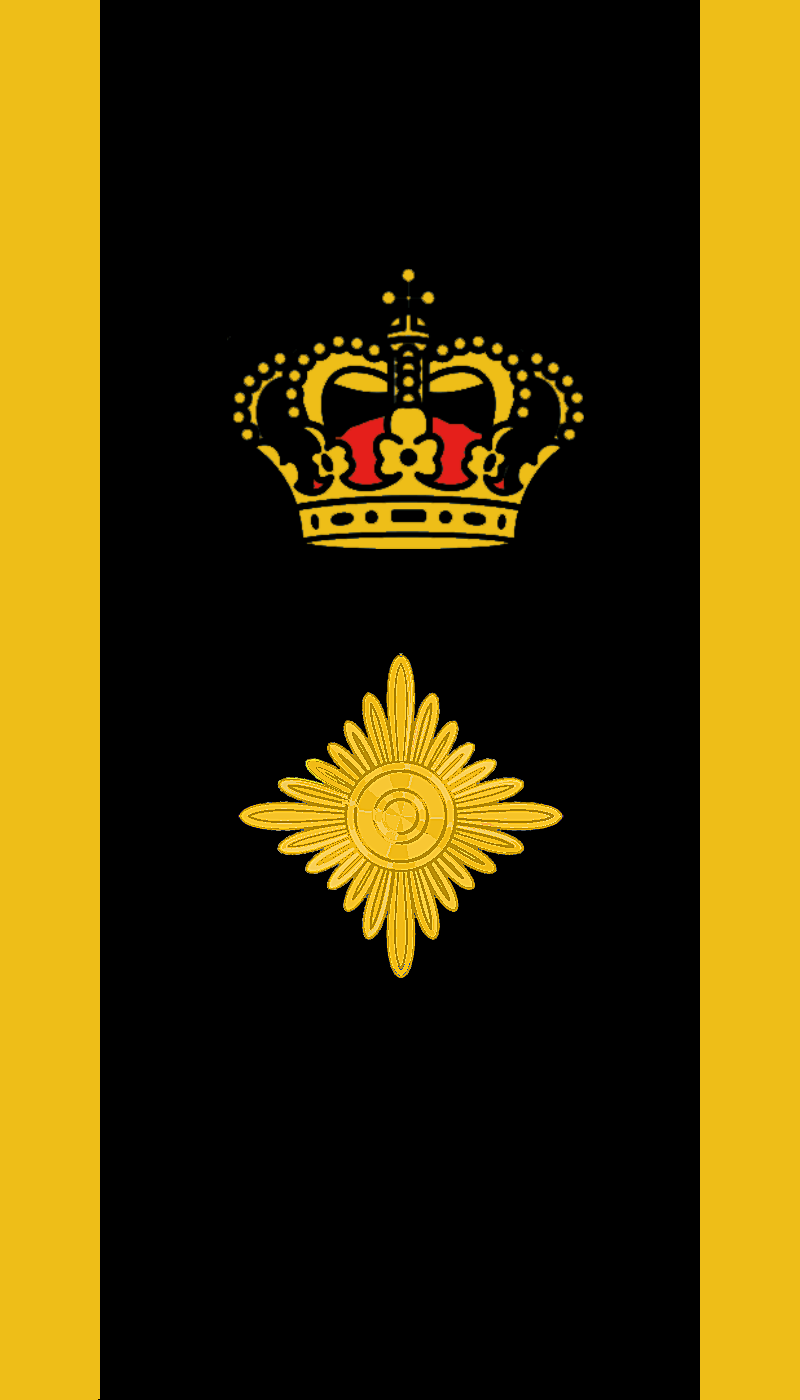
Danish National Police

French National Police

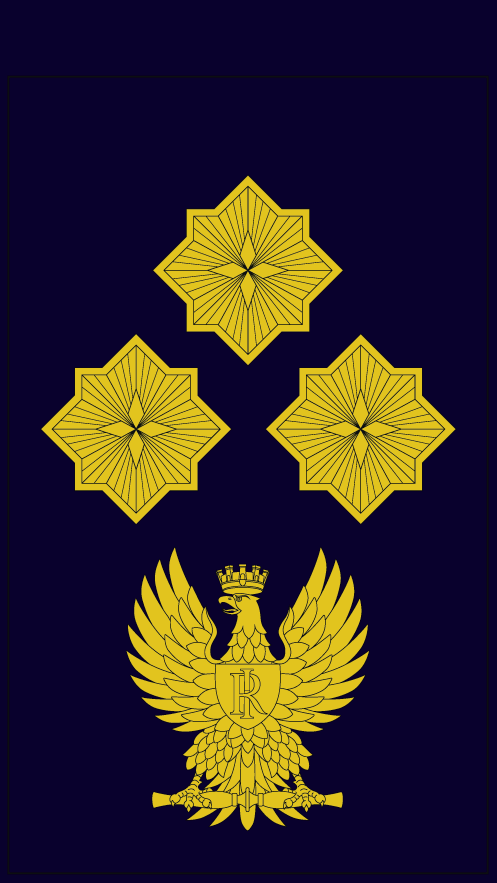
Italian State Police

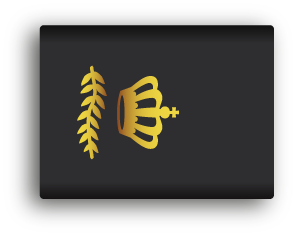
Dutch National Police Corps

Polish Police

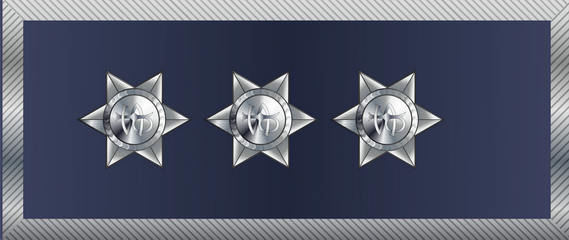
Portuguese Public Security Police

Romanian Police

Singapore Police Force

Spanish National Police Corps

Swedish Police

California Highway Patrol

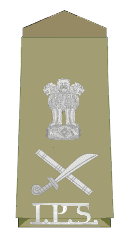
Indian Police Service

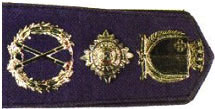
Malta Police Force

Bangladesh Police

== Duties and functions ==
Police commissioners may be experienced police officers, though some are politically appointed, or elected civilians, not sworn police officers. In such cases, usually a professional chief of police is in charge of day-to-day operations. In either event, commissioners are the designated heads of the organizations.

In police services of the UK, Commonwealth and United States, the title of commissioner may designate the head of an entire police force, or a member of an oversight board of police commissioners.

A police commissioner should not be confused with a police commissary. In France, Italy, Spain and some Latin American countries "commissary" denotes the head of a single police station (analogous to an inspector or chief inspector in UK and Commonwealth countries). However titles such as commissaire in French, commissario in Italian and comisario in Spanish can mean either commissioner or commissary in English, depending on the context.

== By country ==
=== Australia ===
The Australian Federal Police and the autonomous Australian state and territory police forces are each presided over by a commissioner, who is accountable to constituents through a minister of state. The state of Victoria at one time (during the 19th-century Gold Rush) appointed commissioners for both the metropolitan area and the goldfields. Outranking both was a "chief commissioner"—a title that has survived the disappearance of the earlier junior commissioners. In Victoria, as elsewhere, the second-highest rank is deputy commissioner.

The insignia of rank worn by a commissioner in the Australian Federal Police and the New South Wales Police Force is a crown over a star and crossed and wreathed tipstaves, similar to the insignia of a military full general. In all other civilian forces, the insignia is a crown over crossed and wreathed tipstaves, similar to the insignia of a military lieutenant-general.

=== Brunei ===
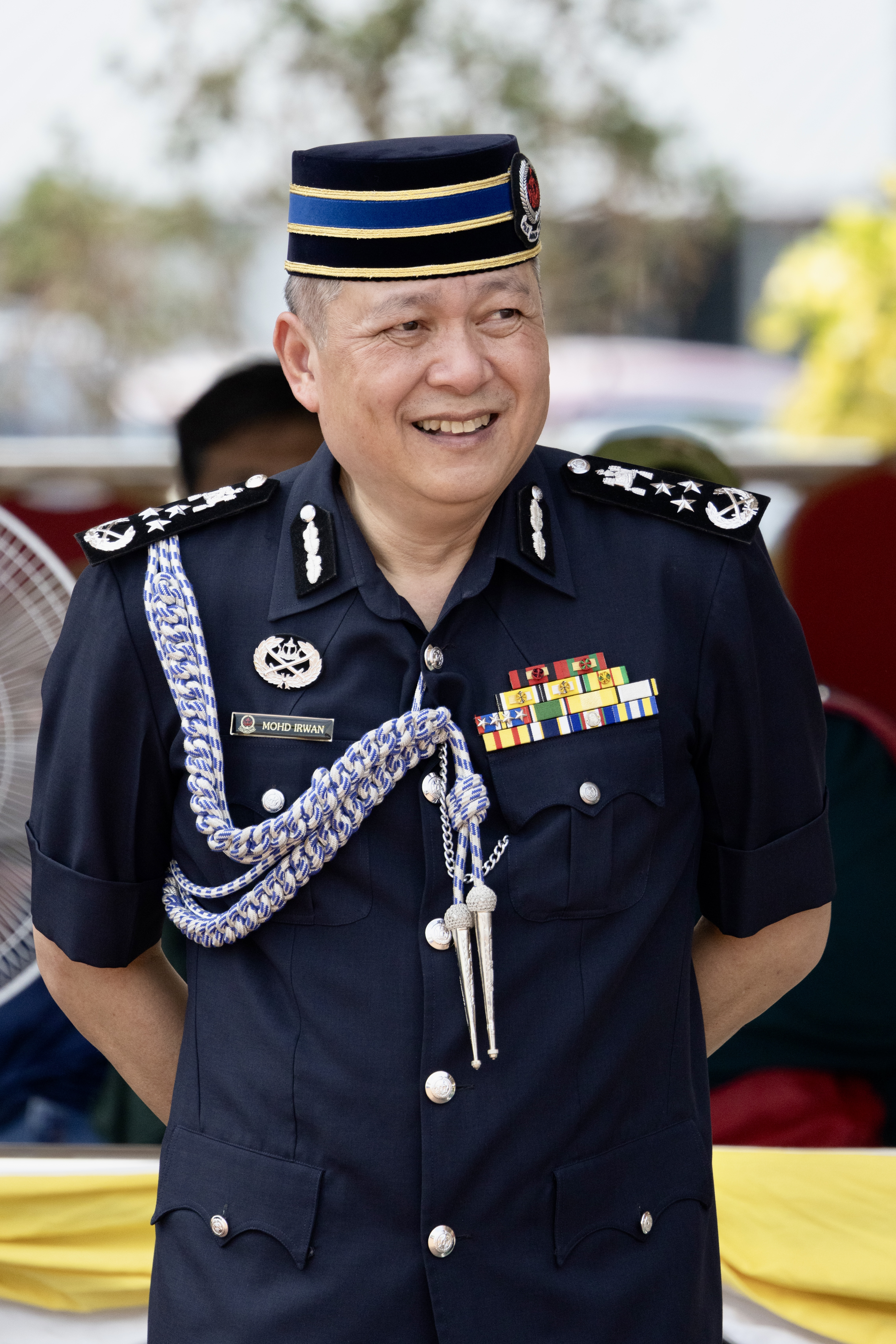
Commissioner of Police, Brunei

After the proclamation of the 1959 Constitution of Brunei, it was stated that a Commissioner of Police has to be appointed for the Royal Brunei Police Force (RBPF). The first commissioner was appointed on 29 September 1959, assuming command of the force. The Commissioner of Police, who oversees the RPB headquarters (the Commissioner's of Police Office) with assistance from the Deputy Commissioner of Police and Secretariat, reports directly to the monarch.

=== Canada ===
In Canada, the highest-ranking officer of the Royal Canadian Mounted Police and of the Ontario Provincial Police holds the rank of commissioner. In the province of Alberta, the Police Act requires the municipality to appoint police commissioners that are required to provide public oversight of the police. In Alberta's capital city, Edmonton, there are nine commissioners, including two city councillors and seven city-appointed members, the object being to "provide civilian oversight for the police service". The commissioners appoint and oversee a chief of police, to whom is delegated the day-to-day management of the force.

=== France ===
In reference to the police of France and other French-speaking countries, the rank of commissaire is a rank equating to somewhere in between the British police ranks of superintendent and chief superintendent. The rank above is called "divisional commissioner". This is sometimes equated to a chief superintendent, but can in some cases hold a similar function to a Deputy Chief Constable. A former intermediate rank of "principal commissioner" was abolished in 2006.

=== Germany ===
The second-highest career bracket in German law enforcement leads to the rank of police commissioner or Kommissar. Training encompasses three years in a police academy (graduating as Diplom-Verwaltungswirt or bachelor of public administration). The highest possible rank within this career bracket is that of Erster Polizeihauptkommissar or Erster Kriminalhauptkommissar. The work of a Kommissar, in general, centers on investigation of felonies, depending on the branch of police and department to which he belongs, similar to the equivalent of an inspector in British-styled police forces. Roughly equivalent to a British commissioner would be (Landes-) Polizeipräsident or Inspekteur der Polizei, titles that differ between police forces in Germany.

=== Hong Kong ===
The head of the Hong Kong Police (Royal Hong Kong Police Force 1969 to 30 June 1997) force has used this title since 1938.

=== Iceland ===
The National Police of Iceland employs a national commissioner (Icelandic: Ríkislögreglustjóri) (four-star-rank) that is the head of 15 districts across Iceland. The commissioner is not an experienced police officer. Most police chiefs in Iceland are educated lawyers, not experienced police officers.

Of the 15 districts in the Icelandic police, each has its own police chief and is headed by the national commissioner. The minister of judicial affairs is in charge of law enforcement in Iceland.

=== Ireland ===
The garda commissioner is the officer overseeing the Garda Síochána, the national police force.

=== India ===
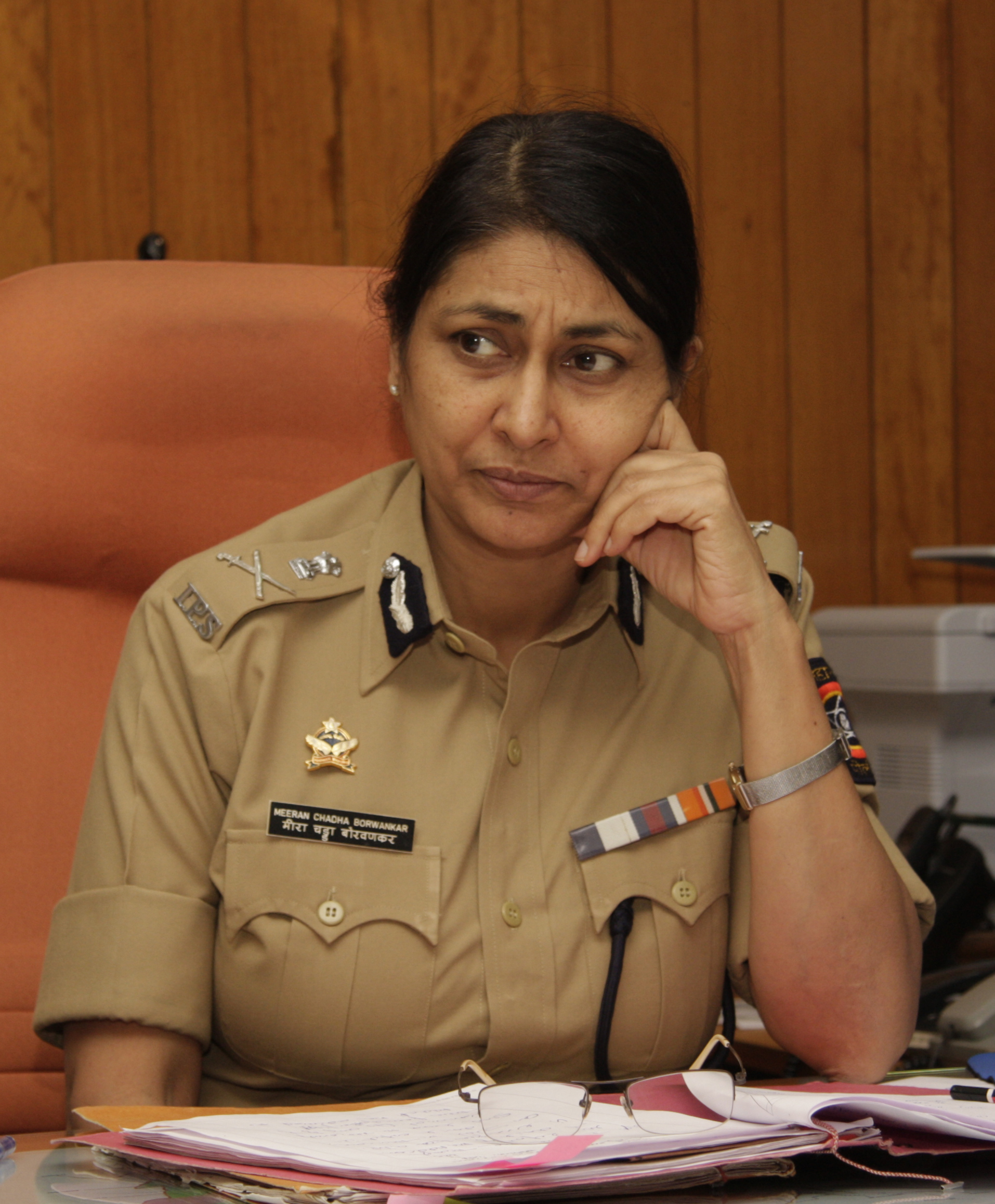
Police Commissioner of Pune, India, in 2010: Her insignia indicates her rank of Director General of Police or Additional Director General of Police.

In India, the office of the Commissioner of Police exists in cities and urban areas where the commissionerate system has been introduced by state governments. A Commissioner of Police serves as the head of the metropolitan or city police force, and the rank of the officer holding this position varies by jurisdiction: Directors General of Police (DGP) or Additional Directors General of Police (ADGP) head large metropolitan forces, Inspectors General of Police (IGP) may be in charge of medium-sized cities, while Deputy Inspectors General of Police (DIG) or Superintendents of Police (SP) can head commissionerates in smaller cities.

Compared with the superintendent of police system in districts, Commissioners of Police are often vested with magisterial powers under state law. These may include the authority to impose prohibitory orders, regulate arms licences, grant permissions for public gatherings, and take preventive or emergency measures to maintain public order. In the district policing system, such powers are usually exercised by the District Magistrate (DM). The extent of authority of a Commissioner of Police varies across states, as the commissionerate system is established by individual state legislations.

=== Indonesia ===
In the Indonesian National Police, the four levels of commissioner are police chief commissioner (komisaris besar polisi), police deputy chief commissioner (ajun komisaris besar polisi), police commissioner (komisaris polisi), and police deputy commissioner (ajun komisaris polisi). Due to strong military influence in its history, even now, police ranks can be compared to the ranks of the Indonesian military. The four commissioner ranks are equivalent to the Indonesian military ranks of colonel, lieutenant colonel, major, and captain, respectively.

=== Italy ===
In the Italian Police, a commissioner (commissario) is the superintendent of a commissariato, a police station/detachment that can either serve an entire township of small or medium dimensions, or a limited area in a metropolitan city.

=== Japan ===
The Japanese Prefectural police forces used this rank, and it was formerly known as chief superintendent. The rank holders assumed the responsibility of being a chief of the prefectural police force. It was lower than a senior commissioner and higher than a superintendent.

The commissioner of police in Japan is equivalent to an army major general.

=== Malaysia ===
In the Royal Malaysia Police, states of Sabah and Sarawak contingent are led by police commissioner than rest of the states in Malaysia, a special status for two states. Each department in the Royal Malaysian Police is led by a director who also holds the rank of commissioner.

=== Malta ===
In the Malta Police Force, the commissioner of police is the head of the police department, responsible for its entire management and control. Since 2016, a chief executive officer at the Malta Police Force was appointed, to work alongside the commissioner of police to implement the Police Force Vision.

=== Mauritius ===
In the Republic of Mauritius, the commissioner of police is the head of the national law enforcement agency called the Mauritius Police Force (MPF), which is responsible for policing on mainland Mauritius, Rodrigues, and other outer islands. The position dates back to 1767, when Antoine Codère was the first commissioner of police. The commissioner operates under the aegis of the Home Affairs Division of the prime minister's office and the MPF employs around 12,500 police officers, who are posted at the eight divisions and 14 branches.

=== Netherlands ===
The first chief commissioner is the head of the National Police Corps. The commissioner is appointed by the Crown, and reports to the minister of Justice and Security. The commissioner is the highest-ranking sworn police member in the country.

=== New Zealand ===
The commissioner of police is the head of the New Zealand Police. The commissioner is appointed for a five-year term by the governor-general, and reports to the minister of police. The position combines two functions, that of chief constable in charge of policing and cases, and chief executive responsible for assets and budgeting. The rank insignia is a sword and a rectangular cylinder crossed over each other with a single crown above. In military terms, the rank is equivalent to Lieutenant General.

The Police Force Act 1886 split the police from the standing army and militia on 1 September 1886. Sir George Whitmore was appointed as the first commissioner, reporting to the minister of defence. Early commissioners came from the United Kingdom with military or law-enforcement experience, such as Walter Dinnie, who had served as inspector at Scotland Yard.

According to the Public Service Commission, from 2021 to 2024 then Commissioner of Police, Andrew Coster received a yearly salary of $670,000, making him tied for the sixth-highest pay among public sector leaders.

=== Nigeria ===
In Nigeria, a commissioner of police is the head of an entire state branch of the Nigeria Police Force.

=== Poland ===
In Poland, a commissioner (komisarz) is a relatively low rank, directly above podkomisarz and below nadkomisarz, comparable to a lieutenant of the armed forces.

=== Portugal ===
Historically, in the Civil Police of Portugal, a police commissioner (Portuguese: comissário) was a divisional commander in the Lisbon and Oporto police forces or the chief of a district police force in the other districts of the country. The chief of each of the Lisbon and Oporto police forces had the title of commissioner general (comissário-geral). With the reorganization of Civil Police and its transformation in the Public Security Police (PSP) in the 1930s, commissioner became a police rank in this force.

Presently, commissioner is an officer rank in the PSP, roughly equivalent to the military rank of captain. It is above the rank of subcommissioner and below that of superintendent. Commissioners usually have the role of second-in-command of PSP divisions commanded by subintendents.

The rank insignia of a commissioner consists in a dark blue epaulet with three PSP stars (silver six points stars with the "SP" monogram in the center).

=== Romania ===
In the Romanian Police, similarly to the French Police (see commissaire de police), the rank of commissioner (comisar) is equivalent to the British police rank of superintendent.

=== Spain ===
In Spain, a National Police commissioner is the chief of a police station. This rank is called comisario principal. A commissioner exists in the biggest cities, and in smaller cities, the chief of the police is headed by a superintendent. In the Civil Guard, this rank does not exist because it has a military organization.

=== United Kingdom ===
In England and Wales, outside of Greater London, police and crime commissioners are directly elected officials charged with securing efficient and effective policing of their police area. They are not warranted police officers, although they appoint and hold to account their chief constable. The first police and crime commissioners were elected in November 2012, with the lowest electorate turnout ever in England and Wales. Historically the title "commissioner" has denoted the professional chief police officer of certain police forces, and that is still the case within Greater London, with the Commissioner of the City of London Police and the Commissioner of Police of the Metropolis. Both these commissioners are appointed, not elected, and since the 1950s have been career police officers (as opposed to the previous practice of appointing former British Army officers). Although they were technically justices of the peace until the 1970s, the commissioners have always worn a similar uniform to police officers, and have been treated similarly in terms of pay and terms of service.

==== British Overseas Territories ====
Several British overseas territories have police commissioners. This practice dates back to the 19th century, when police forces in then-British colonies were established on the lines of the Metropolitan Police. In larger colonies, title was used to denote officials responsible for policing urban regions or sub-divisions of police forces (as was the case in India, New South Wales, Malaya, Nigeria), usually being subordinate to a national or provincial Inspector-General of Police; whereas in smaller colonies, a Commissioner of Police was responsible for leading entire police forces (such as Brunei and most Caribbean colonies). Police forces in some colonies, such as Hong Kong, started off with an Inspector-General of Police which was later re-designated to Commissioner.

The police forces of Anguilla, Bermuda, the British Virgin Islands, the Cayman Islands, Gibraltar, Montserrat and the Turks and Caicos Islands are currently led by Commissioners of Police.

=== United States ===
Some U.S. police agencies use the title "commissioner" for the head of a police department or state agency. The term may refer to:

- The commanding officer of a police agency, such as for the California Highway Patrol, the Baltimore Police Department, and the Metropolitan Police Department of St. Louis.
- A civilian manager of a police agency, such as for the New York City Police Department, Boston Police Department, and Nassau County Police Department.
- A member of a board of civilians who oversee a police agency, such as for the Los Angeles Police Department and Detroit Police Department.

== See also ==
- Sheriff
- Police and Crime Commissioner
- Chief Constable (UK)
- Chief of police (United States and Canada)
- Commissioner of Police of the Metropolis (Greater London)
- Commissioner of Police for the City of London
- Commissioner of Police (Hong Kong)
- Police Commissioner of Mumbai
- Police Commissioner of New Delhi
- Commissioner of Police (New Zealand)
- Commissioner of Police (Singapore)
- Police Commissioner (New York City)
- Police Commissioner (City of St. Louis)
- Commissaire de police
