= MCGS Barracuda =

Mauritanian patrol vessel

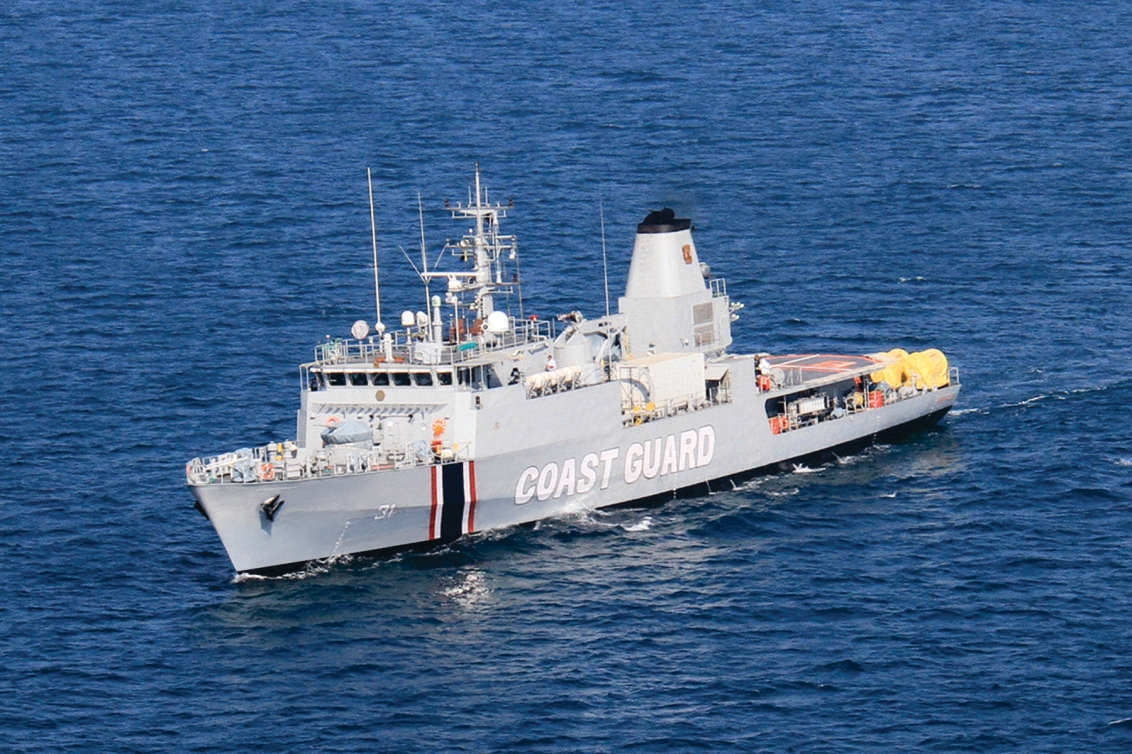
- MCGS Barracuda at sea.

History

Mauritius
- Name: MCGS Barracuda
- Builder: Garden Reach Shipbuilders and Engineers
- Cost: ₹365 crore (equivalent to ₹583 crore or US$61 million in 2023) (FY 2014)
- Laid down: 23 April 2012
- Launched: 2 August 2013
- Acquired: 20 December 2014
- Identification: MMSI number: 645403000; Callsign: 3B2101
- Status: Active

General characteristics
- Class & type: Kora-class corvette
- Displacement: 1,350 tons full load
- Length: 74.1 m (243 ft)
- Beam: 11.4 m (37 ft)
- Draft: 3.5 m (11 ft)
- Speed: 22.5 knots (42 km/h)
- Range: 5,000 km (2,700 nmi; 3,100 mi)

MCGS Barracuda is a Kora-Class offshore patrol vessel of National Coast Guard Mauritius. Built by Garden Reach Shipbuilders and Engineers, Kolkata, India and launched on 2 August 2013, it is the first warship to be exported by an Indian shipyard.

== History ==
India and Mauritius concluded a contract on the purchase of an offshore patrol vessel derived from the Kora class corvette built by GRSE on March 4, 2011. The total contract value of the vessel is US$58.5 million. Of this amount, US$10 million will be a one-time grant from the Government of India and the remainder US$48.5 million will be extended under a Line of Credit through the EXIM Bank of India to the Government of Mauritius. Its keel was laid in April 2012 and was launched on 2 August 2013.
The ship was built in 42 months and got delivered to The Mauritian Coast Guard in September 2014 on the sidelines of Prime Minister Narendra Modi's state visit to Mauritius.

== Features ==
Valued at US$50 million, MCGS Barracuda has an integrated bridge system and advanced controls and main engines. It measures 74.1 metres (243 ft 1 in) in length and 11.4 metres (37 ft 5 in) in breadth and will be capable of moving at a maximum speed of 22 knots (41 km/h; 25 mph) with an approximate displacement of 1350 tonnes. Armed with a 30 mm gun featuring a stabilised optical remote control system, Barracuda also carries heavy machine-guns (HMGs) and medium machine-guns (MMGs) to deal with hostile situations. Crewed by a complement of 83 officers and sailors, Barracuda can be deployed for a wide range of tasks including anti-piracy, search and rescue, anti-smuggling and anti-drug surveillance operations. The ship will safeguard the exclusive economic zone of Mauritius and can be used as a logistics support vessel and to transport troops. Barracuda is also capable of supporting helicopter operations without a hangar.

As per the agreement, GRSE would design, construct and deliver the vessel in a stipulated time of 42 months from the date of signing the contract. The patrol vessel shall be 74.10 meters long, 11.4 meters wide, have a maximum speed of 20 knots, will displace 1350 tonnes and have an endurance of more than 5,000 nautical miles (9,300 kilometres). The ship will be fitted with state-of-the-art main engines, with an engine control and bridge system which will integrate all communication and navigation systems. The ship will be provided with improved habitability with fully air conditioned modular accommodation for a crew of 93.

The vessel will be fitted with a close-range naval gun and an optical Fire Control System as well as advanced Global Maritime Distress and Safety System. The OPV will be able to carry a light helicopter, a rigid hull inflatable boat, a landing craft vehicle and a rubber inflatable boat. The OPV will enhance security in the Exclusive economic zone of Mauritius by carrying out anti-piracy, anti-smuggling and anti-narcotics operations. It will also perform logistic support operations including transportation of small detachment of personnel and conduct pollution response, external fire-fighting and helicopter operations.

== Gallery ==
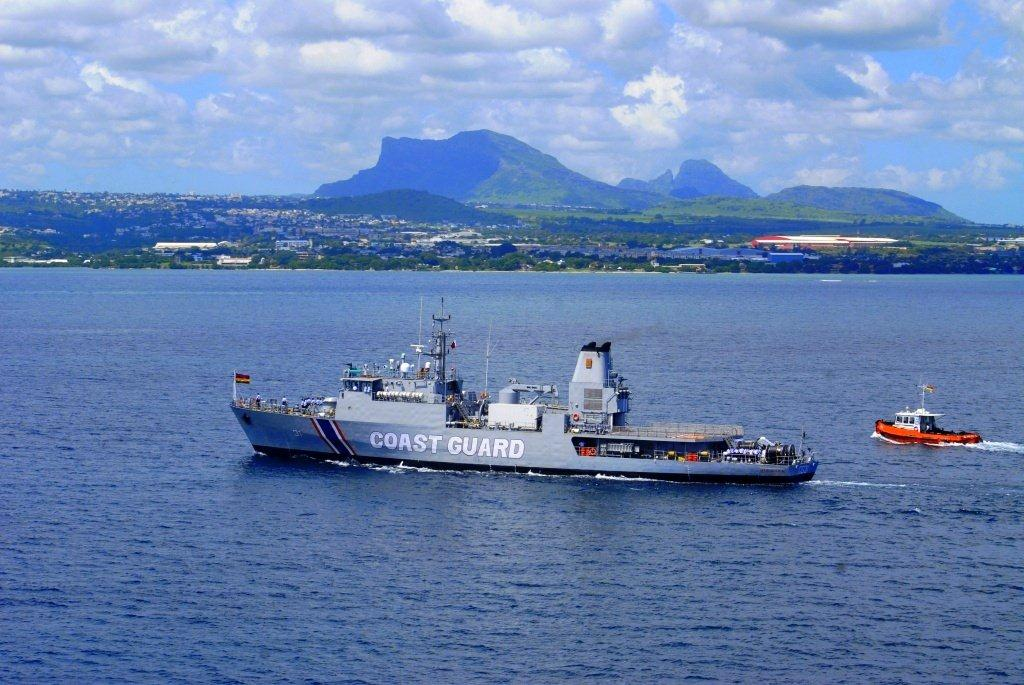
MCGS Barracuda a derivative of Kora-class corvette en-route to Mauritius for delivery to National Coast Guard Mauritius.

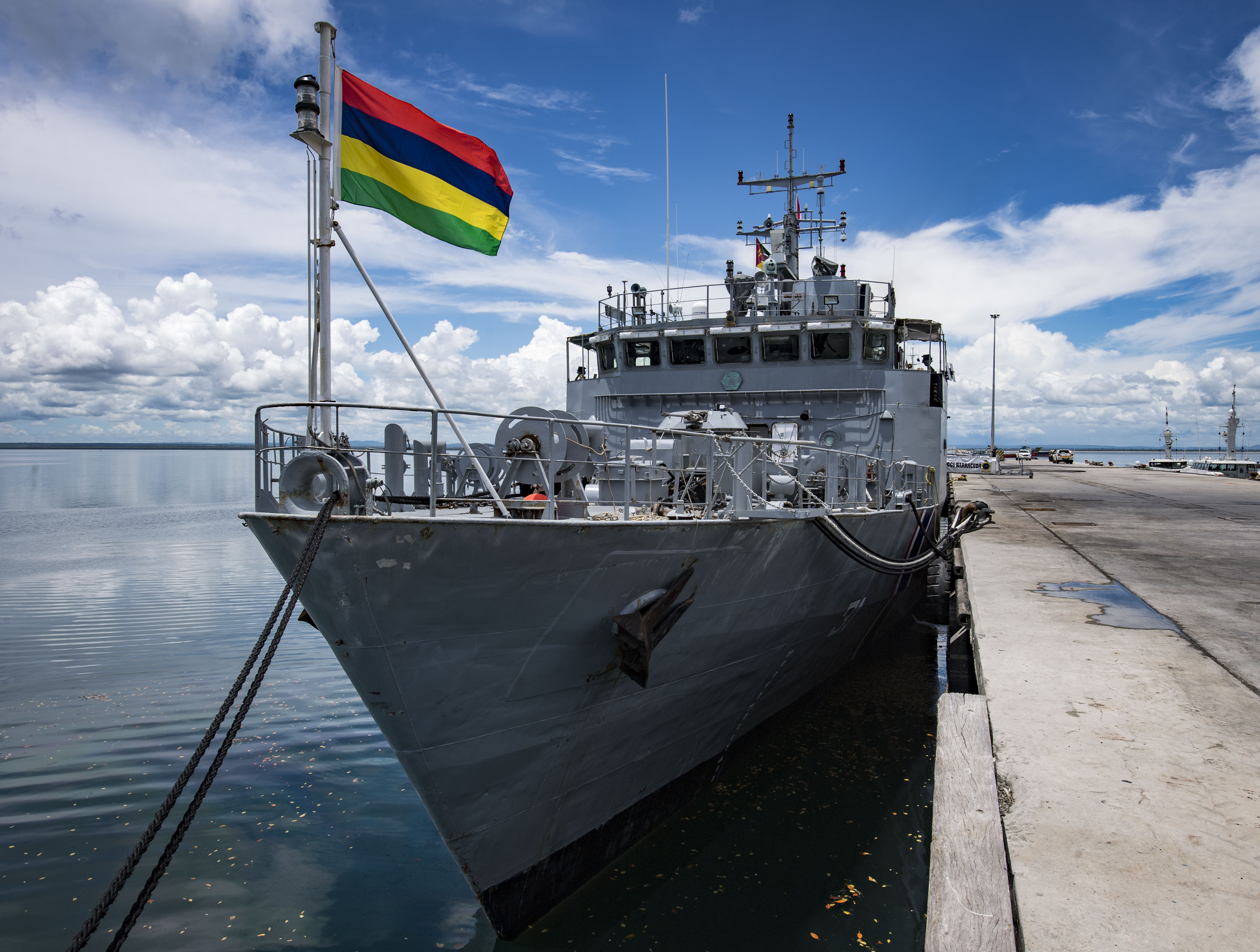
Mauritius Coast Guard offshore patrol vessel MCGS Barracuda (CG-31) docked at Pemba, Mozambique.

== See also ==
- Praga-class patrol boat
- Mandovi Marine (15 Meter)-Class Patrol Craft
- Military of Mauritius
