= Praga-class patrol boat =

Praga class of patrol boats are series of five Rigid-hulled inflatable boat built by M/s Praga Marine, India for National Coast Guard (NSG) organisation, Mauritius and are also referred as Heavy Duty Boat (HDB). They are intended for patrol, interception and search and rescue operations.

== Description ==
Each boat in this class have a hull length of 8.9 meters, beam of 3.5 meters with a drought of 0.45 meter. They are propelled by two Johnson gasoline on-board motors which generate 400 HP. They have a high speed of 45 knots and range of 300 Nmiles at cruising speed of 35 knots. They have a complement for 4 crews and also have space for 4 passenger. The Praga class is successor of Mandovi Marine (15 Meter) Class Patrol Craft and have been in service since 2000.

== Crafts in the class ==
Name
HDB 01
HDB 02
HDB 03
HDB 04
HDB 05

== Specifications ==
- Displacement: 5 tonnes
- Speed: 45 knots
- Dimension: 8.9 m × 3.5 m × 0.45 m
- Power: 2 Johnson gasoline engines, 400 bhp
- Range: 300 nmiles at 35 knots
- Crew: 4 crew + 4 passengers

== See also ==
- Military of Mauritius
- GRSE Mauritius offshore patrol vessel
