= Military deployment =

Movement of armed forces and their logistical support infrastructure around the world

Military deployment is the international movement of armed forces and their logistical support.

== United States ==
There are numerous groups within the military, which includes (1) Army, (2) Navy, (3) Air Force, (4) Marine Corps, (5) Space Force, and (6) Coast Guard. These groups can be deployed overseas, in combat zones, or in redeployment (which can be done easily after deployment has already occurred). They are a liquid asset to the US, giving the US the ability to react to emerging threats and disasters in regions around the world.

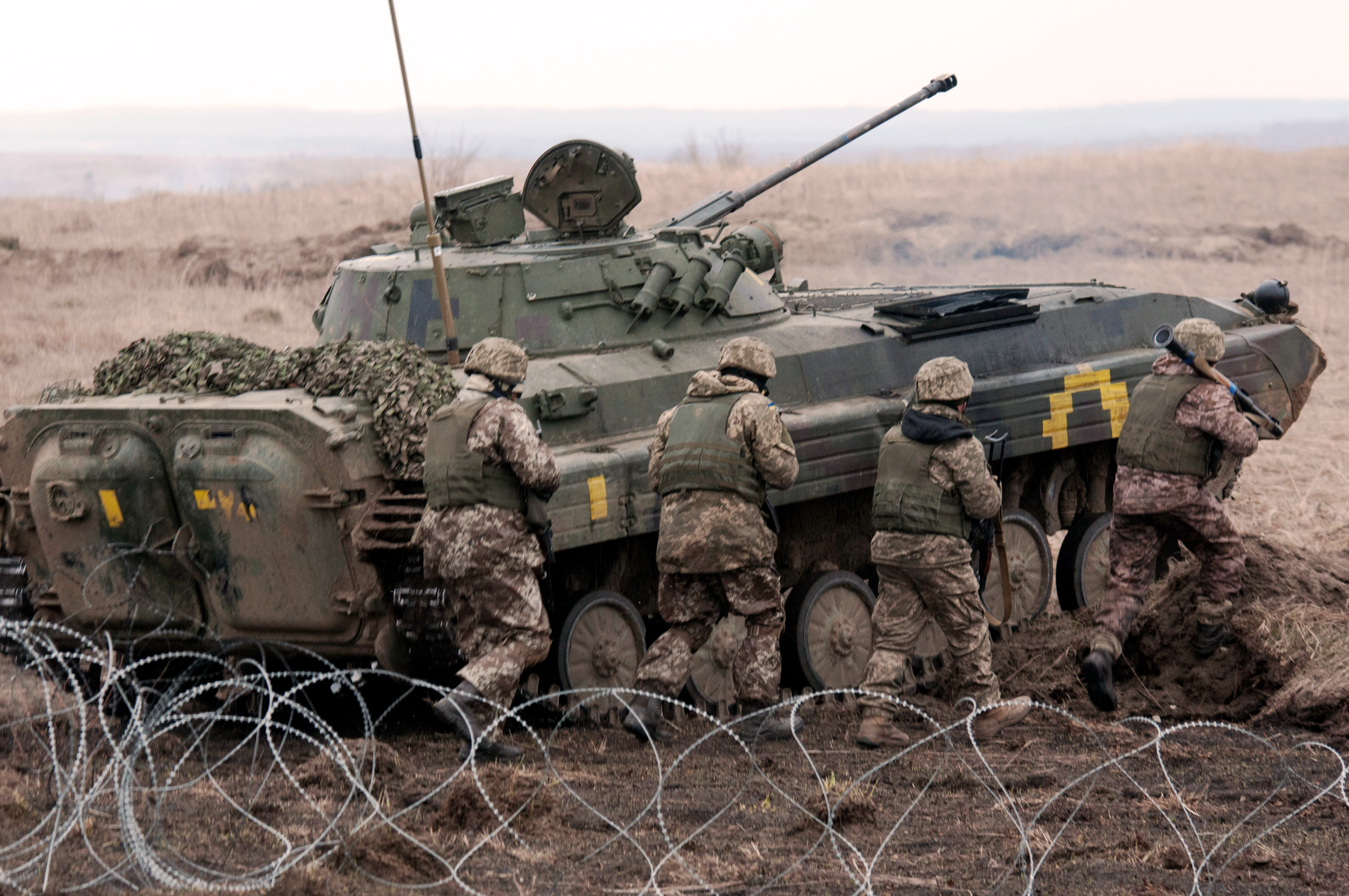
Armed Forces of Ukraine soldiers conducting combined arms tactics training with a BMP-2 IFV

=== Benefits of deployment ===
See also the military benefits page

When military deployment begins, each member can gain benefits throughout their military career, many of which can be passed down to their immediate family, especially their spouse and children.

VA Medical Benefits
This program provides a Medicare Benefits package by The Department of Veterans Affairs (VA), available to all enrolled veterans, allowing a full range of outpatient and inpatient services.

TRICARE Insurance
Tricare is a health insurance option for all eligible military beneficiaries to Active-Duty service members and retired veterans.

Basic Allowance for Housing (BAH)
Basic housing allowance (BAH) is a United States–based allowance that helps uniformed service members with housing compensation based on housing costs in local housing markets when the government quarters are not provided.

Dental Insurance
TRICARE dental program (TDP) is voluntary. It is a dental care benefit for eligible for all active-duty service members, as well as their families.

GI Bill
The 9/11 GI bill (chapter 33 benefits) is an education benefit program specifically for members who served on active duty on or after September 11, 2001. Depending on the individual's situation, the program can include coverage of tuition fees, a monthly housing allowance, a books and supplies stipend, yellow ribbon payments, a college fund, rural benefit payments, and transferability to eligible immediate family members (spouse and children).

=== Deployment concerns with health and mental issues ===
Depression
Throughout the deployment, troops are monitored to see if any depressive symptoms arise. Many active-duty members may gain depressive symptoms throughout the deployment, especially when they are participants in combat environments. Depression and Post-traumatic stress disorder (PTSD) can also be co-existent with lack of sleep, these are all linked with combat stressors.

PTSD
PTSD has many symptoms such as anxiety, avoidance, depressive moods, and physical health issues. Many active members would gain PTSD when they experienced combat events, such as witnessing destruction (homes/villages being destroyed), fire attacks (artillery rocker fire, small arms fire), seeing human remains, and being ambushed. Active-duty members also recall disturbing memories and images that cause physical reactions (such as heart palpitations and trouble breathing) when they are reminded of a straining experience. These traumatizing combat events cause the deployed to have PTSD symptoms along with worsened deployment attitudes and sleep.

Injury
A soldier's health consequences with major military engagement. Many deployed soldiers are deployed in stressful combat zones which can cause bodily injury and ill health. Many deployed soldiers during the U.S. Civil War fell to health problems such as irritable hearts and nostalgia. An irritable heart is described as shortness of breath, heart palpitations, headaches, diarrhea, dizziness, and sleep disturbances. Nostalgia was classified as soldiers who would have a loss of appetite, diarrhea, and chronic fever. Many retired soldiers experience traumatic brain injury from combat environments.

=== Deployment can cause family issues ===
see also: military families during deployment

Family support may be important for soldiers while on deployment. It can help the deployed soldiers to reduce strains and have a more positive deployment attitude/experience. The deployed soldiers' families and children are also affected.

Family involvement during deployment
While the active member in the military is away on deployment, having support from their families minimizes these risks. The soldiers' lives back home can directly impact how their experience during deployment will be. Dealing with combat stress, as well as family-related issues (poor communication, financial issues, and unstable support) increases the chances of the soldier experiencing PTSD, depression, and sleep disturbances. Children are just as involved as the deployed and the spouse. Parents who deal with less stress can help their children have a more positive experience throughout the military deployment. Emotional support is crucial for the child, as it can influence the child's behavior. One way to help the family to have involvement during the deployment can include writing letters and postcards. Keeping strong communication can resolve stress and have a higher chance of a positive experience for all involved.

== See also ==
- Deployments of the French military
- Pakistan Armed Forces deployments
- United States military deployments
- Rapid Deployment Force
