= French frigate Alsace =

FREMM class multi-purpose frigates in the French Navy

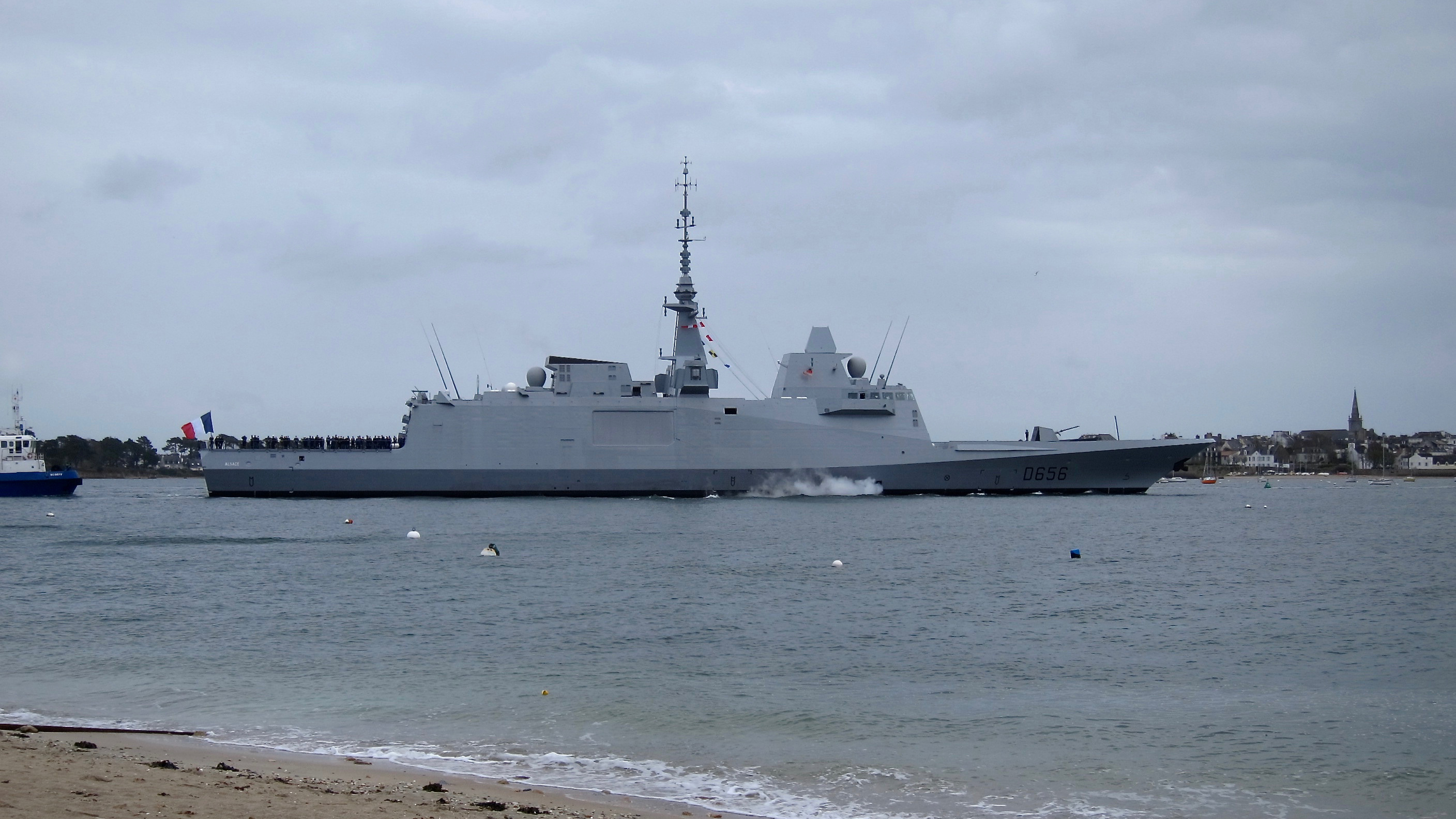
- Alsace on 21 March 2021

History

France
- Name: Alsace
- Namesake: Alsace
- Ordered: 2008
- Builder: DCNS, Lorient
- Laid down: June 2016
- Launched: 18 April 2019
- Commissioned: 16 April 2021
- Home port: Toulon
- Identification: Pennant number: D656
- Status: In active service

General characteristics
- Class & type: Aquitaine-class frigate
- Displacement: 6,000+ tons
- Length: 142 m (465 ft 11 in)
- Beam: 20 m (65 ft 7 in)
- Draught: 7.6 m (24 ft 11 in)
- Propulsion: MTU Series 4000 (2,2 MW everyone); CODLOG
- Speed: 27 knots (50 km/h; 31 mph); max cruise speed 15.6 knots (28.9 km/h; 18.0 mph)
- Range: 6,000 nmi (11,000 km; 6,900 mi) at 15 knots (28 km/h; 17 mph)
- Complement: 145+
- Sensors & processing systems: Héraklès multi-purpose passive electronically scanned array range + 300 km (air) 80 km (surface); Thales STIR EO MK 2 fire control radar; CAPTAS-4 towed-array sonar; UMS 4110 CL hull-mounted sonar
- Armament: 1 x 76 mm Super Rapid gun; 3 x 20 mm Narwhal remote weapon systems; 32-cell SYLVER A50 VLS for Aster 15 and Aster 30 air defense missiles; 8 x Exocet MM40 Block 3 anti-ship missiles (Block 3c variant tested on Alsace in September 2023); 2 x B-515 twin launchers for MU90 torpedoes
- Aircraft carried: 1 × NH90 helicopter
- Aviation facilities: Single hangar

Alsace (D656) is an Aquitaine-class frigate of the French Navy developed through the FREMM multipurpose frigate program. She is the first of two air-defence variants of the class known as FREMM DA (Frégate Européenne Multimissions de Défense Aérienne) in the program.

== Development and design ==
Original plans were for 17 FREMM hulls to replace the nine D'Estienne d'Orves-class avisos and nine anti-submarine (ASW) frigates of the Tourville and Georges Leygues classes. In November 2005 France announced a contract of €3.5 billion for development and the first eight hulls, with options for nine more costing €2.95 billion split over two tranches (totaling 17).

Following the cancellation of the third and fourth of the Horizon-class frigates in 2005 on budget grounds, requirements for an air-defence derivative of the FREMM called FREDA were placed – with DCNS coming up with several proposals. Expectations were that the last two ships of the 17 FREMM planned would be built to FREDA specifications; however, by 2008 the plan was revised down to just 11 FREMM (9 ASW variants and 2 FREDA variants) at a cost of €8.75 billion (FY13, ~US$12 billion). The 11 ships would cost €670 million (~US$760m) each in FY2014, or €860m (~US$980m) including development costs. Subsequently, the class was further reduced to a total of eight ships, though both air-defence variants (Alsace and Lorraine) were retained.

Alsace and her sister ship retain most of the armaments and sensors of their ASW sister ships within the FREMM class. However, the ships have enhancements related to air defence including a more powerful Thales Herakles multi-function radar with more transmitter modules and additional wave-forms and search modes for long range air defence. Additional communications systems, consoles in the combat information centre and berthings for additional personnel are also integrated into the ship. A reinforced bridge structure is incorporated to accommodate the enhanced weight of these systems. The ships also incorporate Sylver A50 vertical launch systems permitting them to carry both MBDA Aster 15 and/or 30 surface-to-air missiles. On the two AAW variants, the Sylver A70 launch systems (used for land-attack cruise missiles on the ASW variants) are removed to provide space for fitting double the number of A50 cells for Aster SAMs.

== Construction and career ==
Alsace was developed as part of a joint Italian-French program known as FREMM, which was implemented to develop a new class of frigates for use by various European navies. Constructed from 2016. On 18 April 2019, the frigate Alsace was launched. She began sea trials in October 2020 and was delivered to French Navy in April 2021. The ship was declared fully operational on 22 November 2021.

From 18 November to 2 December 2021, Alsace took part in Exercise Polaris 21 in the western Mediterranean Sea.

From January to May 2022, Alsace deployed as part of Clemenceau 22 led by the aircraft carrier Charles de Gaulle. According to the ship's captain, Sébastien Baquer, while the Horizon-class frigate Forbin took on the lead air defence mission within the task group, Alsace performed the primary air defence mission as part of the task group "for significant periods" during the deployment. During other periods, Alsace carried out a primary anti-submarine mission. Speaking about how the frigate balances its air defence and ASW missions, Captain Baquer noted that: "a single unit cannot optimize its capabilities in both areas simultaneously, but they are not mutually exclusive. Thus, FREMM DA adapts its electro-acoustic policy to the maneuver idea of the commander of the Carrier Strike Group (CSG) and is able to change its priority domain at short notice".

In October 2023 Alsace was deployed to the Eastern Mediterranean during the Gaza war, joining the helicopter assault ship Tonnerre and the frigate Surcouf which were also deployed to the region. In January 2024, she transitted through the Suez Canal to join multi-national defence operations in the Red Sea in the face of Houthi attacks against international shipping. On 21 March 2024, Alsace shot down three ballistic missiles coming from Yemen, likely using the Aster 30 missile.

Alsace formed a part of the Carrier Strike Group (CSG) centred on Charles de Gaulle during the Mission Clemenceau 25 deployment that began on 28 November 2024.

On 5 January, Alsace and Forbin arrived at Kochi Port. While the rest of the components of the CSG including Charles de Gaulle docked in Mormugao Port Trust Jetty, Goa, on 4 January 2025. The CSG remained in India until 9 January.

In May 2026, the frigate was accompanying the aircraft carrier Charles de Gaulle, and other French vessels, operating in the Indian Ocean in response to the American/Israeli War with Iran.
