= Joseph Philippe Gentil =

Mauritian composer (1928–2021)

Joseph Philippe Gentil MBE / OSK / CSK
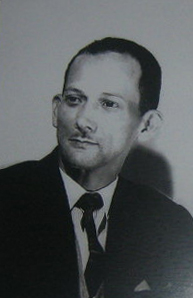
- Born: 9 February 1928; Mauritius
- Died: 26 January 2021 (aged 92); Quatre-Bornes, Mauritius
- Occupations: Police Band Musician & Composer
- Spouse: Claudette Ivy Diane (b. Castel)
- Children: 2: Marie-Danielle, Jacques (Mario)

Joseph Philippe Gentil MBE OSK CSK (9 February 1928 – 26 January 2021) was a Mauritian composer best known for composing "The Motherland", the national anthem of Mauritius.

== Biography ==
Joseph Philippe Gentil was born in the island of Mauritius, Indian Ocean of Irene Annibal and Eugene Gentil son of photographer, musician and conductor, Gabriel Gentil. He worked for over 30 years in the Mauritius Police Force, more precisely with the Mauritius Police Band as a musician and composer. He was known in his younger days for his comedies performed live in open air such as at the Jardin De La Compagnie, Port Louis. He also appeared numerous times on MBC TV for his comedy gigs. He has introduced various European and American musical talents to the Mauritian community by covering their songs, such as Fernandel, Bourvil, Glenn Miller Band, Louis Armstrong, and Henri Salvador. He has composed various marches performed by the Mauritius Police Band; unfortunately, many of his compositions were destroyed when the band's room in Vacoas burned down. However one of his compositions remains, the national anthem of Mauritius, "Motherland", which he won as a competition when Mauritius became independent from the British Empire in 1968.

The lyrics were written by Mauritian poet Jean-Georges Prosper.

On the day of independence, 12 March 1968 a national newspaper mistakenly published the name and photograph of Philippe Oh San who was the Mauritius Police Band's maestro as the national anthem's composer. The remaining newspapers were returned to be reprinted with the correction. As a result, it has left the name of Mr. Oh San mistaken in the mind of many Mauritians as being the anthem's composer. However, Mr. Oh San, after hearing Mr. Gentil's anthem being performed by the band musicians, encouraged for the work to be entered into the contest for a new national anthem and after receiving Mr. Jean Georges Prosper's lyric proposed for the anthem found the lyric perfectly matching the melody composed by Philippe Gentil, though the two were created separately.

Following the release of Motherland as the national anthem, Gentil was awarded the title of Member of the Order of the British Empire (MBE) by the late Queen Elizabeth II of the United Kingdom. In 2008 and 2010 he obtained other titles of the Officer of the Order of the Star and Key of the Indian Ocean (OSK) and Commander of the Order of the Star and Key of the Indian Ocean (CSK) from the Mauritian government for his musical service to the nation. On 8 March 2019, Philippe Gentil was conferred by the Municipal Council of Quatre-Bornes, the Honorary Freedom of the Town of Quatre-Bornes.

A revered figure in the music scene, Philippe Gentil was the tutor and mentor of many musicians and professional performers for the largest part of his life. He contributed to the arrangement of songs for several Mauritian artists as well as various brass band marches. After his retirement in 1988, he formed and directed a new parade band for the Beau-Bassin Prison Police officers for about 20 years which he then left in the hand of others. He was married to Claudette Gentil, also known as Diane, born Claudette Ivy Castel (1940 - 2024) with whom he had 2 children, a daughter, Marie-Danielle Gentil (1960 - 2017) and a son Jacques Philippe Mario Gentil, (draftsman / songwriter) (b. 1961).
