= French naval base of Djibouti =

- Interactive map of French naval base of Djibouti
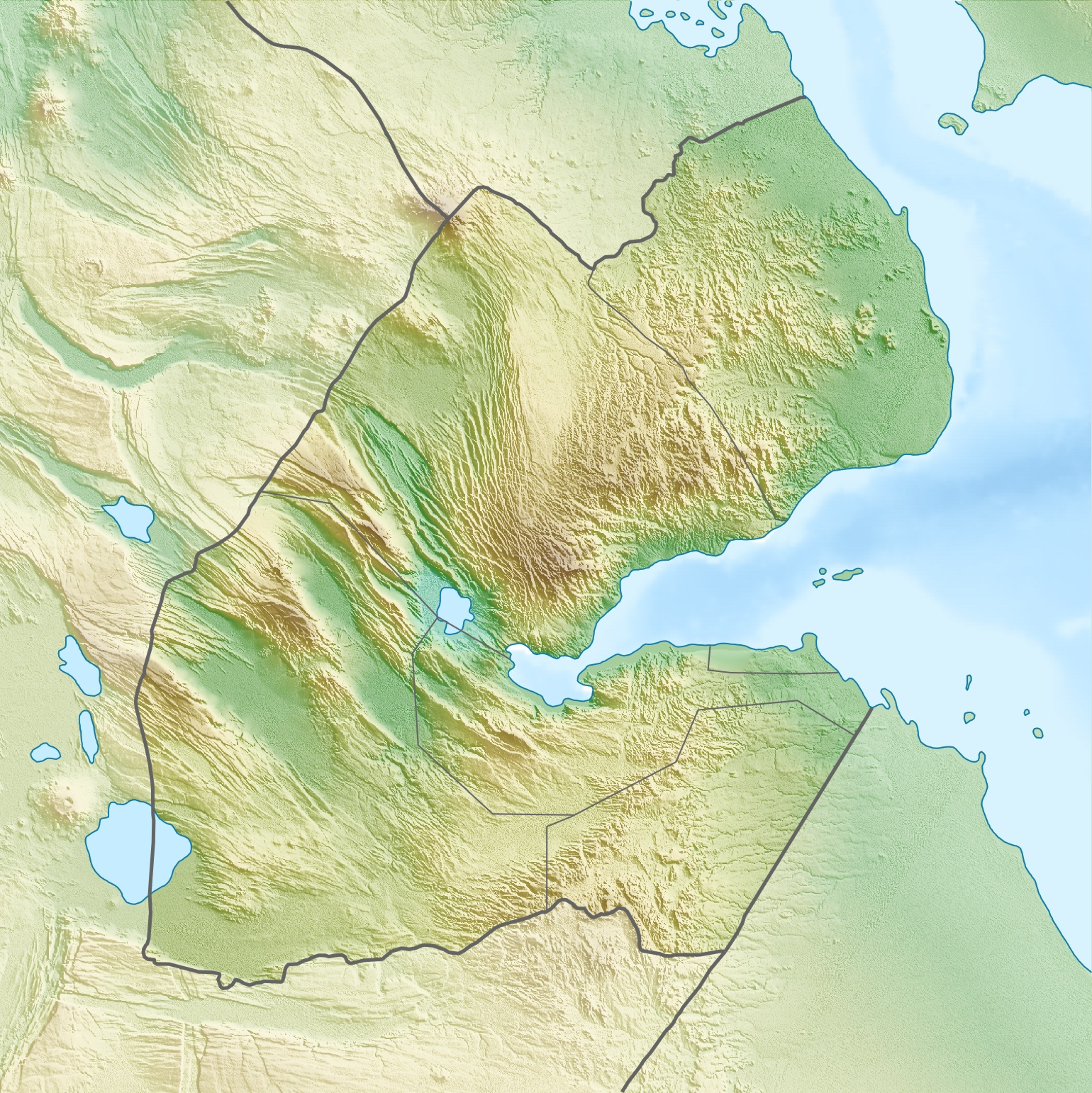
- Location in Djibouti

Location
- Location: Djibouti
- Coordinates: 11°22′N 43°05′E

The French naval base of Djibouti, also known as the Naval base of Héron, is located in East Africa in Djibouti.
