= Motherland (anthem) =

National anthem of Mauritius

- Coat of arms of Mauritius
- National anthem of Mauritius
- Lyrics: Jean-Georges Prosper
- Music: Joseph Philippe Gentil
- Adopted: 1968

Audio sample
- U.S. Navy Band instrumental version in E-flat major: file; help

"Motherland" is the national anthem of Mauritius. The music was composed by Philippe Gentil, and the English lyrics were written by Jean-Georges Prosper. The anthem is short and briefly describes the luscious landscape of Mauritius. It also mentions the qualities of its people: peace, justice and liberty.

The national anthem was first played during the first Independence Day on 12 March 1968.

== History ==
Mauritius was a British colony from 1810 and became an independent state on 12 March 1968, with Elizabeth II as Queen of Mauritius, represented as head of state by the Governor-General. The last governor, Sir John Shaw Rennie, served as the first governor-general until 27 August 1968. A competition was held to choose the best national anthem. Jean Georges Prosper, a popular poet, won the competition, and "Motherland" was chosen as the national anthem. Music for the anthem was later composed by police band musician Philippe Gentil. During the announcement of independence, the flag of the United Kingdom was lowered by Lieutenant D.E. Wenn from the British side, and the flag of Mauritius was hoisted by Inspector Palmyre of the Special Mobile Force from the Mauritian side. "God Save the Queen", the national anthem of the UK, was played for the last time, and "Motherland" was played for the first time. It was followed by firing of 31 salvos in the harbour and a loud cheer from the crowd.

The Labour Party in various coalitions with the IFB, CAM and PMSD ruled Mauritius from the time of independence in 1968 to 1982, even cancelling the 1972 elections in order to stay in power. The newly founded MMM in coalition with Harish Boodhoo's PSM won the 1982 election. Whilst in government interim-PM Paul Bérenger with the support of his MMM ministers sneakily decided to establish Mauritian Creole as the national language and replaced the national anthem Motherland by a Creole version during the 15th Anniversary of Independence on 15 March 1983, which was even aired nationwide on radio by the MBC. Paul Bérenger had not consulted with the elected Prime Minister Anerood Jugnauth and other key partners of the MMM-PSM government, but had worked with Rama Poonoosamy (MMM Minister of Culture) and MBC's boss Gaëtan Essoo to implement the unauthorised changes. Coincidentally during that week MMM-leader Jugnauth was on an official visit in India, and PSM-leader Boodhoo was off-duty due to an illness. Paul Bérenger's authoritarian behaviour was sternly opposed by the MMM-PSM alliance, thus leading to the sacking of Gaëtan Essoo, then director general of the MBC and elections being called again in 1983.

== Lyrics ==
Original English lyrics

Glory to thee, Motherland
O Motherland of mine.
Sweet is thy beauty,
Sweet is thy fragrance,
Around thee we gather
As one people,
As one nation,
In peace, justice and liberty.
Beloved Country,
May God bless thee
For ever and ever.

French lyrics

Gloire à toi, île Maurice,
Île Maurice, ô ma mère patrie,
Fraîche est ta beauté,
Doux est ton parfum,
Nous voici tous debout,
Comme un seul peuple,
Une seule nation,
En paix, justice et liberté,
Pays bien-aimé,
Que Dieu te bénisse,
Aujourd'hui et toujours.

Mauritian Creole lyrics

Laglwar pou twa, Patri
Mo Patri.
Dous to bote,
To parfin bien dou,
Otour twa nou rasanble
Kouma enn sel pep,
Kouma enn sel nasion,
Dan lape, lazistis ek liberte.
Zoli Pei,
Ki Bondie beni zot
Pou toultan ek pou toultan.

== Criticism ==
Critics consider that the national anthem failed to inspire the people during not-so-prosperous times of the economy when communalism and casteism made headway. There is a strong criticism in sections of Mauritian media that although the anthem states unity as the prime strength of the nation, the nation stands divided even after 40 years of independence. Unity described as the strength of the nation, as quoted as "as one people as one nation", is also posted as a challenge the country faces at the face of globalization. The harmony and cultural mix of different religious communities of the country are also not seen united in the nation. The unrest during 1969 clashes between Muslims and Creoles and the football tournaments until 1980 conducted on community basis are commonly quoted to show the indifference.

== See also ==
- Coat of arms of Mauritius
- List of national anthems
