= Overseas military bases of France =

This article lists the various overseas military bases of France. The maintenance of overseas military bases enable the French Armed Forces to conduct expeditionary warfare, or "external operations", known as OPEX (Opérations Extérieures), and often tend to be located in areas of strategic or diplomatic importance.

As of July 2025, roughly 30,000 military personnel are deployed by the French Armed Forces around the world. Between 6,000 and 10,000 personnel are deployed in Metropolitan France; 9,050 personnel of the country's "sovereignty forces" are deployed in Overseas France; and 3,150 personnel of its "prepositioned forces" are deployed in countries it considers strategically significant. It also has 950 personnel engaged in Opération Chammal in Iraq; 2,500 personnel engaged in NATO missions in Eastern Europe; 600 personnel engaged in European Union missions; and 750 personnel engaged in United Nations missions. It also has 150 personnel in the Combined Maritime Forces and 900 personnel in French maritime deployments. 3,800 personnel are also engaged in recurring missions.

== Map ==
Map of current military installations

== Active deployments ==
=== Sovereignty forces ===
Number in map above	Territory	Garrison	No. of personnel	Note
1	French Guiana	Les forces armées en Guyane (FAG)	2,650	
3	Réunion & Mayotte	Les forces armées dans la zone Sud de l’océan Indien (FAZSOI)	2,100	
4	New Caledonia	Les forces armées en Nouvelle Calédonie (FANC)	2,000	
5	French West Indies	Les forces armées aux Antilles (FAA)	1,100	
6	French Polynesia	Les forces armées en Polynésie française (FAPF)	1,000	

=== Prepositioned forces ===
Number in map above	Country	Deployment	No. of personnel	Note
7	Djibouti	Les forces françaises stationnées à Djibouti (FFDj)	1,500	
8	United Arab Emirates	Implantation militaire française aux Émirats arabes unis (IMFEAU)	750	
9	Gabon	Les éléments français au Gabon (EFG)	250	

=== Others ===
Number in map above	Country	Deployment	No. of personnel
2	Germany	French Forces and Civilian Elements stationed in Germany (FFECSA)	500

== Former deployments ==
Country	Deployment	Date of withdrawal	No. of personnel
Central African Republic		7 June 2021	200
Mali		17 February 2022	5,000
Burkina Faso		19 February 2023	400
Niger	Niamey Air Force Base	22 December 2023	1,500
Chad		31 January 2025	1,000
Senegal		17 July 2025	350
Ivory Coast	Les forces françaises en Côte d'Ivoire (FFCI)	By end of 2025	600

== See also ==
- Mission Aigle
- List of countries with overseas military bases
- Power projection
