= Mandovi Marine (15 meter)-class patrol craft =

Mandovi Marine patrol crafts are 15 metre long patrol crafts with glass reinforced plastic hull built by Mandovi Marine Pvt LTD, Indore, India.

== Description ==
They are powered by twin MWM TD-232 V-12 diesels which each develop 370 hp, which are coupled to a Hamilton 1341 water jet unit. The crafts have a top speed of 25 knots. They are armed with a 7.62-mm MG and a Furuno FR 8030 Radar however they resemble oilfield crew boats. They are hi-speed version of Mandovi Marine (12.5-Meter) Class Patrol Craft in service of Indian Coast Guard.

== Operators ==
- Mauritius

The boats of this class which entered in service of National Coast Guard (NSG) organisation, Mauritius are Barracuda, Castor, Marlin, Polaris, Sirius, Capella, Rigel, Pollux and Canopus. Ordered on 24 July 1987, they were gifted by the Indian Government. The first two units were delivered early in 1989, second batch of three with some modifications on 1 May 1990 and the last four at the end of 1990. As of 2010, only four remained in inventory and the class has been succeeded by Praga Class Patrol Boat introduced in 2000.

- Mauritania

The same basic design was utilised to build four boats for the Islamic Republic of Mauritania by M/s Madovi Marine.

== Specification ==
- Displacement: 15 tonnes
- Length: 15 metre
- Breath: 3.6 metre
- Draught: 0.8 metre
- Power: 2 Cummins diesels
- Propulsion: 2 Hamilton water-jets, 750 bh
- Speed: 24 knots
- Range: 240 nautical miles at 12 knots
- Crew: 8

== See also ==
- Mandovi Marine (12.5-Meter) Class Patrol Craft
