= 2024 Mauritian social media ban =

Mauritius social media ban

Access to major social media platforms in the Republic of Mauritius was briefly suspended from 31 October to 2 November 2024 by the Information and Communication Technologies Authority (ICTA). Initially set to last until 11 November, coinciding with the country's general elections, the ban was introduced in response to the leakage of sensitive recordings, believed to have been obtained through illegal wiretapping. However, after 24 hours, the government reversed the decision, citing consultations with relevant authorities. The reversal followed significant opposition from political groups and media organizations, raising concerns about the balance between national security and freedom of expression in the digital age.

== Background ==
On 31 October 2024, the ICTA instructed telecommunications providers to block access to several major social media platforms, including Facebook, Instagram, X (formerly Twitter), TikTok, and Instagram. This decision followed the circulation of secret audio recordings online since late September 2024. The recordings, allegedly obtained through illegal wiretapping, featured private conversations involving politicians, journalists, civil society leaders, and foreign diplomats. The government expressed concern that the leak could undermine the integrity of the general election, scheduled for 11 November 2024.

Prime Minister Pravind Jugnauth's office stated that the leaked materials had compromised national security and the integrity of the republic, including its relations with international partners. In response, the government imposed the social media ban to prevent further dissemination of the recordings in the lead-up to the elections.

== Withdrawal ==
The social media ban, initially intended to last for 12 days, was lifted after just 24 hours. On 2 November, the ICTA issued a statement announcing the withdrawal of the ban, attributing the change to "consultation with competent authorities." The decision followed widespread public criticism, particularly from opposition political parties, media organizations, and citizens who relied on social media for news and communication. While the reversal was seen as a win for free speech advocates, the initial ban sparked a debate regarding its legality and its potential impact on democratic freedoms.

== Missie Moustass scandal ==
The controversy surrounding the social media ban centered on the account Missie Moustass (translated as "Mr. Moustache"), which was responsible for sharing the leaked recordings on platforms like TikTok. The scandal is also known as Moustass Leaks in the local press. The account quickly gained attention for posting a series of audios that included conversations involving high-profile individuals. Despite efforts to shut it down, the account resurfaced on various platforms, continuing to post new recordings.

The leaked materials contained serious allegations, including one in which the Police Commissioner allegedly pressured a forensic doctor to alter a report about the death of a man who had reportedly been beaten by police officers. This led to the initiation of a judicial investigation. Additionally, several private conversations involving Charlotte Pierre, the British High Commissioner to Mauritius, were also leaked, escalating the scandal.

The Missie Moustass leak is considered one of the most significant political scandals in recent years, involving allegations of corruption and misconduct within government and law enforcement, which raised concerns about transparency and accountability.

Extracts of Moustass Leaks were viewed for the first time in Court on 16 January 2026 at the District Court of Rose Hill during the prosecution hearing of politician Adrien Duval whose car was involved in a collision in Ébène on 21 September 2022, causing serious injuries to a 56 year-old female pedestrian. Duval then refused to submit to toxicological tests; he claimed that he was not the driver, as his friend Luciano Arnaud Martin (also known as William Martin) was at the wheel when the pedestrian was struck at high speed. During the court hearing the episode Complot Accident Adrien was presented, although private transcriber Lindsay Luckhoo admitted that he could certify neither the video's origins nor the true identity of each voice involved.

== Reactions ==
The social media ban and its reversal elicited mixed reactions from political figures. Opposition parties, including Linion Reform, condemned the suspension as an unconstitutional infringement on the right to freedom of expression as protected by the Mauritian Constitution. Prominent opposition leader Roshi Bhadain called the move "a gross violation of democratic rights," comparing it to practices in authoritarian regimes.

Critics within the opposition argued that the government's actions aimed to suppress critical voices ahead of the election. They suggested that the government's focus on controlling the narrative, by restricting access to information, was an attempt to deflect attention from the leaked recordings implicating several politicians and officials in misconduct.

Jugnauth, who was seeking re-election as leader of the Militant Socialist Movement (MSM), faced mounting pressure. The leaked materials involving high-ranking officials in his administration led to further scrutiny of his leadership, particularly as the election neared.

== Debate ==
The reversal of the social media ban did not resolve the legal issues regarding its implementation. Legal experts and civil rights groups questioned whether the ICTA's directive violated principles of proportionality and freedom of expression under the Mauritian Constitution. The government defended the ban as a measure to safeguard national security, while critics contended that it was an excessive action aimed at suppressing political dissent ahead of the election.

In response, Linion Reform filed a motion in the Supreme Court challenging the legality of the ban. The case highlighted the tension between the government's need to address security concerns and the protection of civil liberties, particularly in an age when social media plays a key role in political dialogue.
