= French forces in Djibouti =

French overseas military base

- Djibouti

Site information
- Operator: France
- Controlled by: French Armed Forces
- Condition: Operational

Site history
- Built for: Military Airbase, Joint base

Garrison information
- Current commander: Eric Gernez
- Occupants: 1,450 soldiers (2018)

The French forces in Djibouti (FFDj) (French: Les forces françaises stationnées à Djibouti, lit. 'The French forces stationed in Djibouti') is a French overseas military base. It constitutes one of the larger French military contingents outside France. The French military has remained present in Djibouti since the territory's independence. Starting June 1977 the conditions of the French forces were set by the framework of a provisional protocol (equivalent to a defense agreement). A new agreement has been in force since 2014. In December 2023, a new defense cooperation treaty is under discussion for renewal.

== History ==
The base's force was 1,950 strong at the start of 2015. In mid-2018 the force was downsized to 1,450.

In June 2025, the French National Assembly adopted the bill authorizing the ratification of the Defense Cooperation Treaty between the French Republic and the Republic of Djibouti, and the agreement for the restitution of the land of the Heron naval base in Djibouti.

== Operations ==
The general commanding the French forces stationed in Djibouti has a joint staff. At the start of 2015, he commanded around 1,950 soldiers, 1,400 of whom were permanent, belonging to pre-positioned and rotating units which constitute the present forces. During the summer of 2015, the workforce fell to between 1,650 and 1,750 people. The military base is managed by the Djibouti Defense Base Support Group.

=== Ground units ===
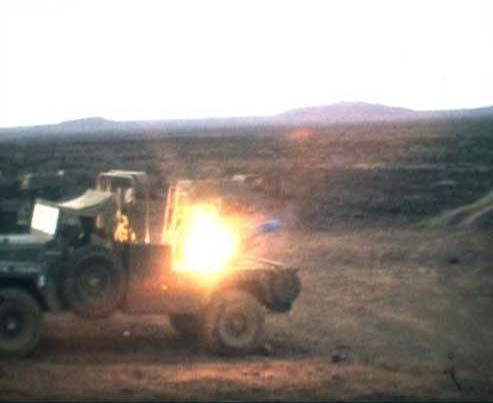
Shot from one of five equipped vehicles launches missiles SS 11 of the 5th RIAOM to Goubad (30 km southwest of Djibouti) in 1971.

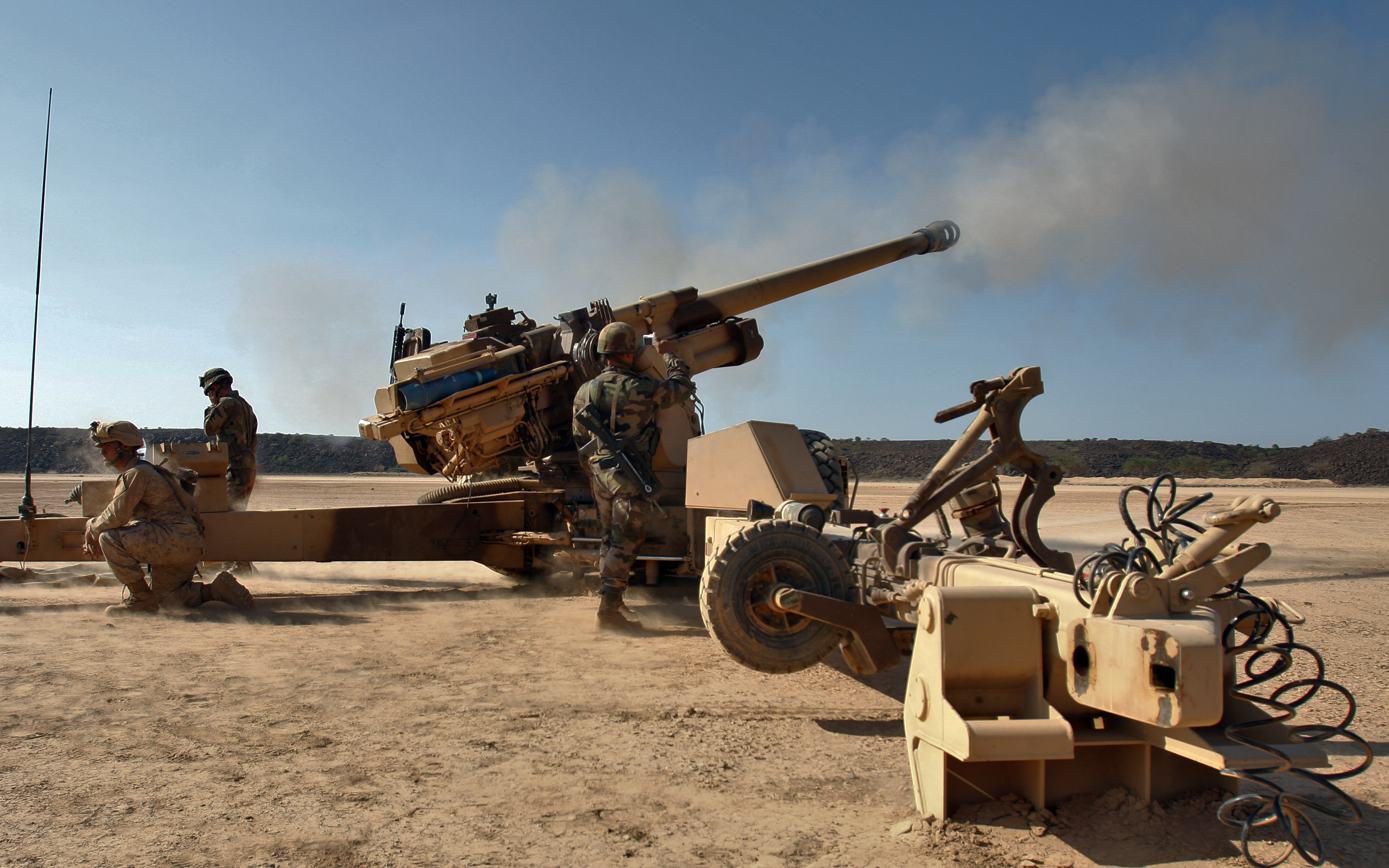
Canon TRF1 155 deployed by the 93rd Mountain Artillery Regiment in Djibouti in 2010.

On 1 November 1969, the 5th Overseas Interarms Regiment (fr. 5ème Regiment Interarmes d'Outre Mer (RIAOM)) was recreated in Djibouti, then named the French Somilaland. 5th RIAOM maintains the motto "Proud and strong." On that date, it inherited the pennant and traditions of the 1st Battalion of Somali Tirailleurs (1916-1946) (fr:1er bataillon de tirailleurs somalis).

The 5th RIAOM is the last combined arms regiment of the French Army. Its location, as well as the missions entrusted to the Republic of Djibouti, a region of the globe in perpetual evolution, with multiple upheavals, imposes a permanent operational posture. It is also the traditional regiment of Djibouti.

Grouped in the Brière de l'Isle district, it is made up of:

- The CCL, which provides operational logistics as well as the implementation of the regiment's command post. It also arms the combat training and hardening centre of Djibouti (CECAD). This centre accommodates permanent units or short-term missions of the 5th RIAOM, other units of the FFDj, units or schools in metropolitan France, Djiboutian, and foreign forces.
- The 1st Infantry Company Acute Mission, equipped with VAB and antitank missiles;
- The 3rd Armoured Squadron in short mission, equipped with AMX-10 RC;
- The 6th Land Battery Unit Artillery - Land Acute Mission equipped with TRF1 and mortar 120 mm.

On 1 August 2008, the Battalion of the Light Air Djibouti (BATALAT) was attached to the 5th RIAOM. After becoming a Detachment of the Light Aviation of the Army (DETALAT) with 70 soldiers, it was equipped at the end of 2014 with four Puma and two Gazelle Hot helicopters.

=== Air units ===
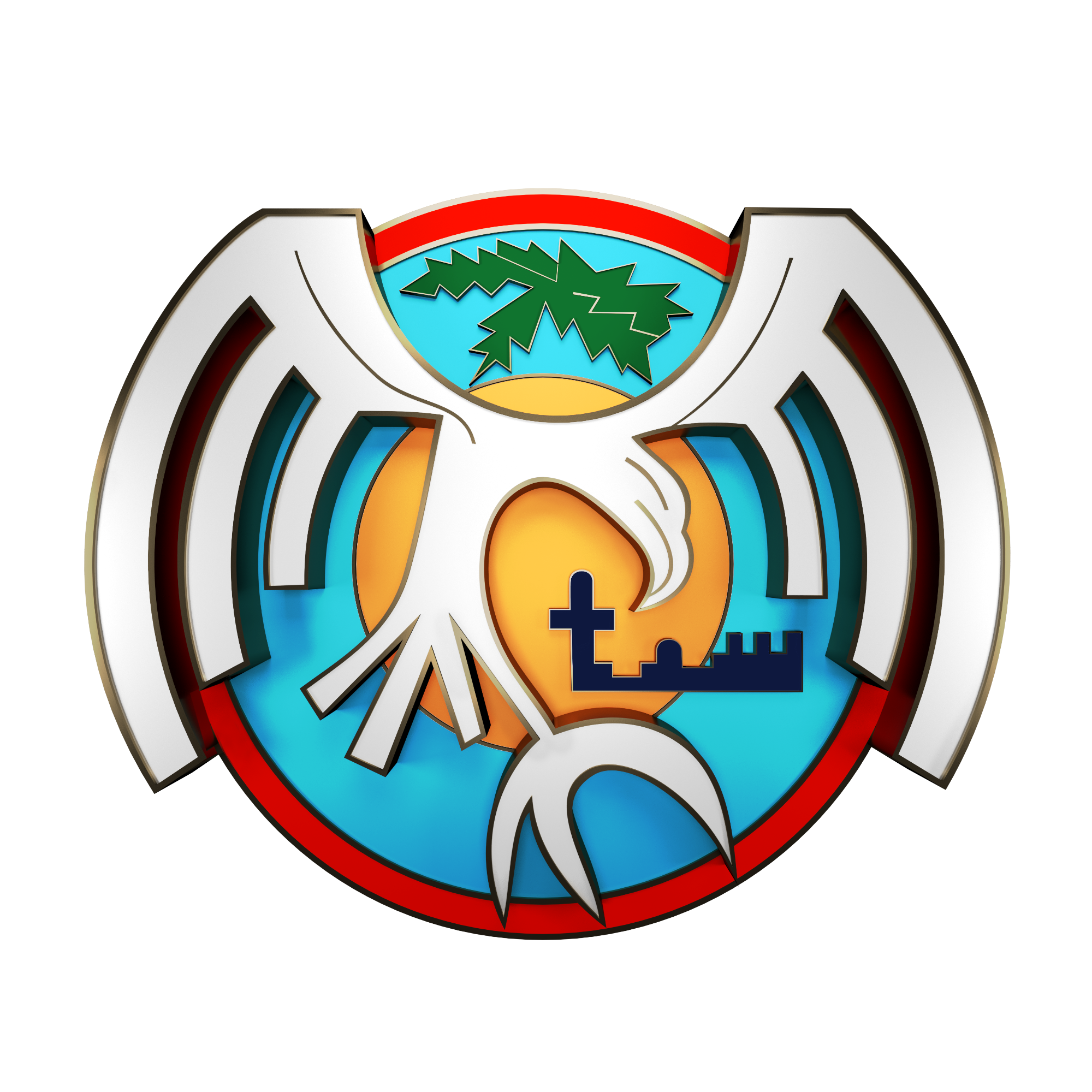
Logo of the French Air Force Base in Djibouti

The Squadron of French Somaliland (CFS) was incorporated on 1 April 1933, on the field of Saline, with three Potez 25 TOE biplanes and a Potez 29 detached medical of the 39th of parked aircraft regiment in the Levant. The Djibouti Air Base was transferred to Gabode land in 1935.

In 2011, the Base aérienne 188 Djibouti "Colonel Emile Massart" accommodated around fifteen aircraft, and being a support base with a joint vocation, it also accommodated many support units including an armed ground-air defense section of eight 20-mm twin-tubes and eight firing stations for Mistral missiles. It also hosts two squadrons:

- Escadron de Chasse 3/11 Corse with four Mirage 2000-5F and three Mirage 2000 D
- Escadron de Transport 88 Larzac flying a Transall C-160 until July 2019 and since then a CASA CN-235 and three SA330 Puma.

In addition, a detachment from naval aeronautics (Breguet Atlantic, then Breguet Atlantique 2) is permanently stationed there.

=== Naval units ===
The French Navy deploys a CTM landing craft in Djibouti. It also has deployed special forces for training and for combating piracy around the Horn of Africa. Two Engins de Débarquement Amphibie – Standards (EDA-S) landing craft (Dague & Mousquetare) to be delivered to naval forces based in Djibouti. The landing craft are to replace the CTM craft and better support operations in the region. As of the mid-late 2020s, two RP10-class tugboats are also being deployed with French naval forces.
