= List of active ships of the Chilean Navy =

This is a list of active ships of the Chilean Navy, which is one of the three branches of the Chilean Armed Forces. The Chilean Navy's mission is to provide the Chilean State with naval power and an effective maritime service, to safeguard sovereignty and territorial integrity, maintain the security of the nation and support national interests when necessary and in any place required.

As of April 2025, the Chilean Navy has more than 130 ships in service of various sizes and roles; four attack submarines, eight major surface combatants (frigates) and more than ninety minor surface combatants (patrols), some of which are only identified by their pennant number. These are followed by four amphibious ships with three support vessels that are identified only by their unofficial name, four survey vessels with two minor support vessels, eleven auxiliary ships and one training ship. Also a nominal ship, the Ironclad Huáscar, which is really just a ceremonial ship and historical relic.

== Key ==
The tables below use the following key:

Key	Description
Class	The formal class of the vessel, when known or identifiable
In service	Number of vessels in service of the corresponding class
Boat/ship	Vessel name when formally assigned; does not apply to many light boats known only by its number or call code
No.	Refers to the pennant number, but also includes the hull classification symbol
Comm.	The year in which it entered service in the Chilean Navy, and also indicates if it is a second-hand vessel with an abbreviation ^{(s)}
Displacement	In tons (t), and this determines the order of the vessels in the tables
Type	Refers to the vessel according to the characteristics or role for which it was built or modified
Builder	The shipyard that builds the vessel, plus the place and country of origin if possible
Note	References and/or links related to the vessel

== Active ships ==
=== Submarine forces ===
Class	In service	Boat	No.	Comm.	Displacement	Type	Builder	Note
Conventional submarines
Scorpène class	2	O'Higgins	SS-23	2005	1,577 t surfaced; 1,711 t dived	Attack submarine	DCN, Cherbourg, France / IZAR, Cartagena, Spain	
Scorpène class	2	Carrera	SS-22	2006	1,577 t surfaced; 1,711 t dived	Attack submarine	DCN, Cherbourg, France / IZAR, Cartagena, Spain	
Thomson class (Type 209/1400-L)	2	Thomson	SS-20	1984	1,520 t surfaced; 1,614 t dived	Attack submarine	HDW, Kiel, Germany	
Thomson class (Type 209/1400-L)	2	Simpson	SS-21	1984	1,520 t surfaced; 1,614 t dived	Attack submarine	HDW, Kiel, Germany	

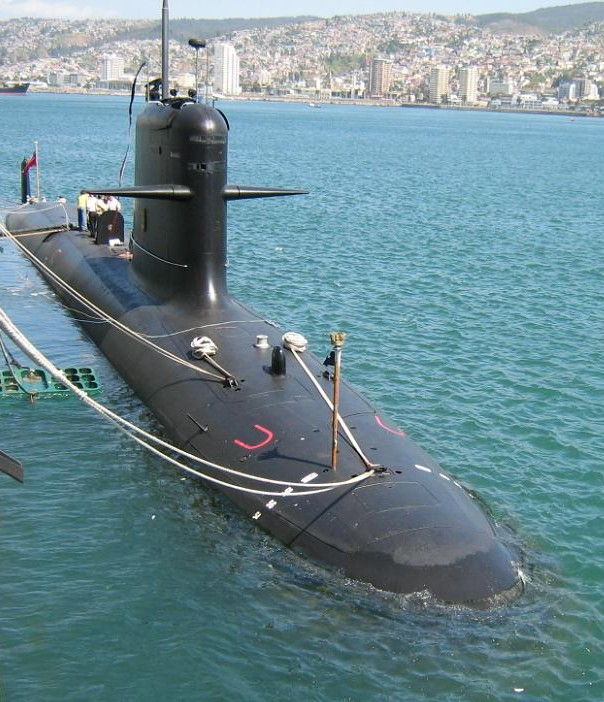
Carrera
(Scorpène class)

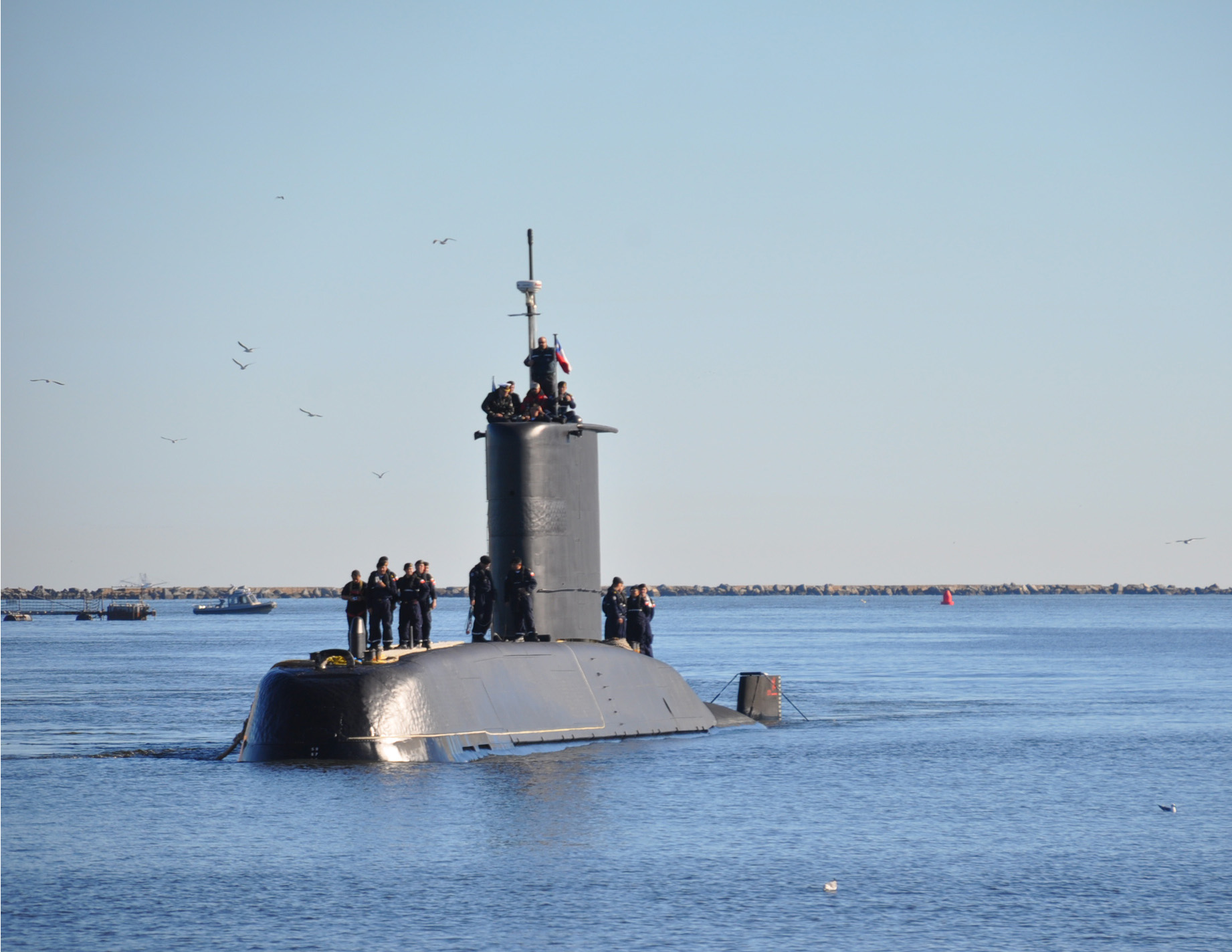
Simpson
(Thomson class)

=== Major surface combatants ===
Class	In service	Ship	No.	Comm.	Displacement	Type	Builder	Note
Frigates
Type 22 Batch 2 (Boxer class)	1	Almirante Williams (Note: It is the flagship of the Chilean national squadron.)	FF-19	2003^{(s)}	4,900 t	Anti-submarine frigate	Swan Hunter, Wallsend, UK	
Type 23 (Duke class)	3	Almirante Cochrane	FF-05	2006^{(s)}	4,267 t	Anti-submarine frigate	Yarrows, Glasgow, UK	
Type 23 (Duke class)	3	Almirante Lynch	FF-07	2007^{(s)}	4,267 t	Anti-submarine frigate	Yarrows, Glasgow, UK	
Type 23 (Duke class)	3	Almirante Condell	FF-06	2008^{(s)}	4,267 t	Anti-submarine frigate	Swan Hunter, Wallsend, UK	
Adelaide class	2	Almirante Latorre	FFG-14	2020^{(s)}	4,267 t	Anti-aircraft frigate	AMECON, Williamstown, Australia	
Adelaide class	2	Capitán Prat	FFG-11	2020^{(s)}	4,267 t	Anti-aircraft frigate	AMECON, Williamstown, Australia	
Karel Doorman class (M class)	2	Almirante Blanco Encalada	FF-15	2005^{(s)}	3,373 t	Multi-purpose frigate	Damen, Vlissingen, Netherlands	
Karel Doorman class (M class)	2	Almirante Riveros	FF-18	2007^{(s)}	3,373 t	Multi-purpose frigate	Damen, Vlissingen, Netherlands	

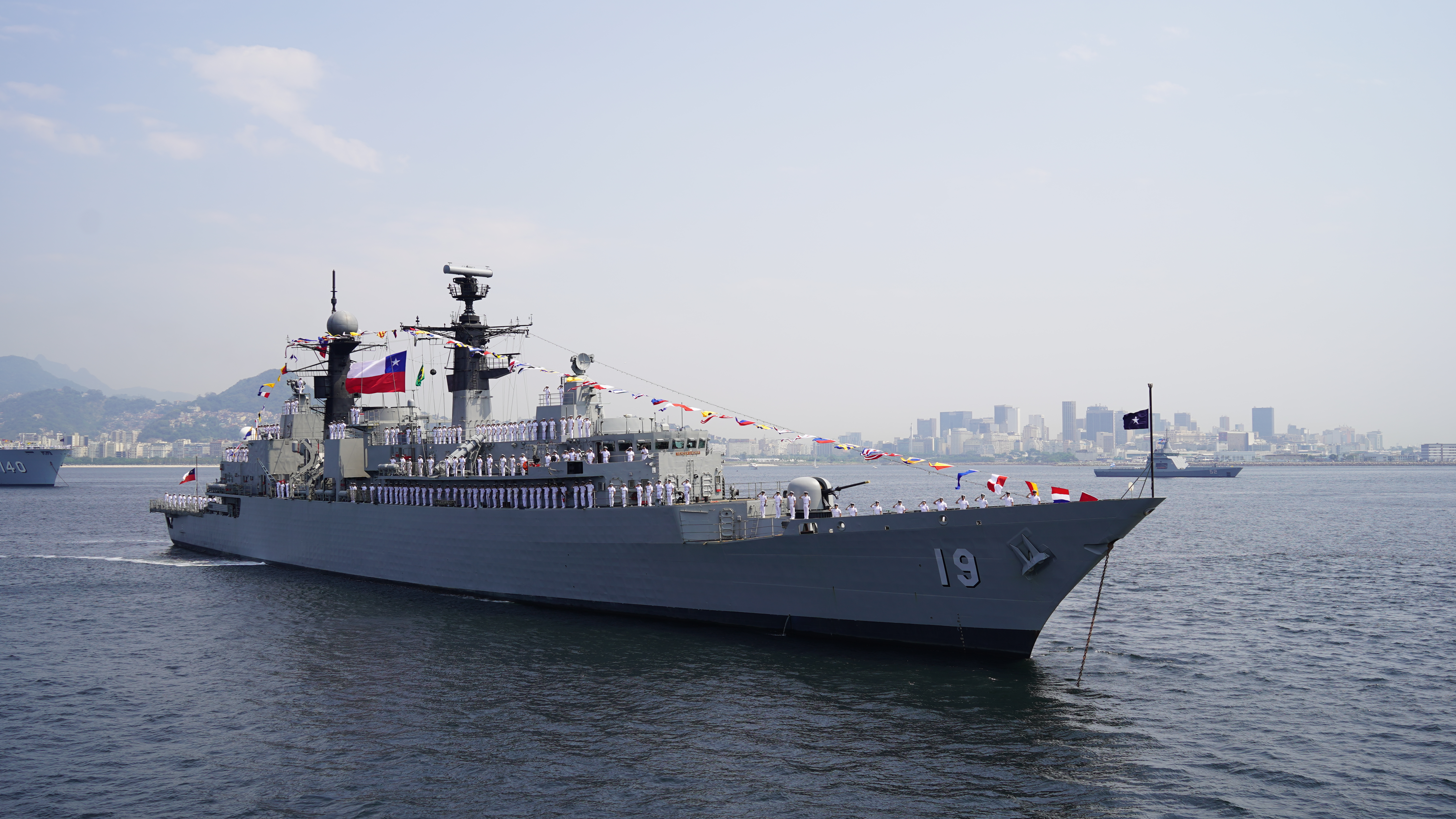
Almirante Williams
(Type 22 frigate)

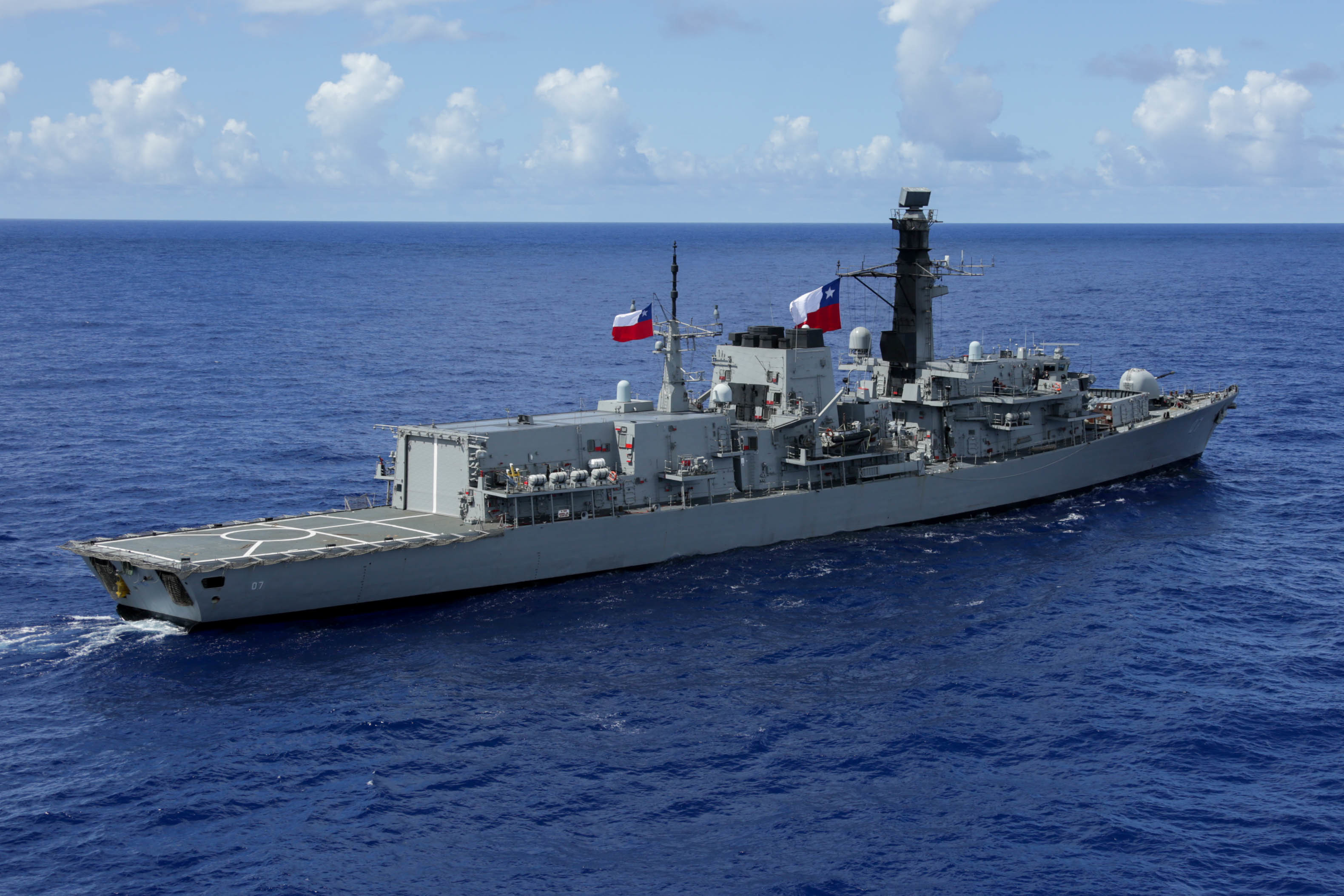
Almirante Lynch
(Type 23 frigate)

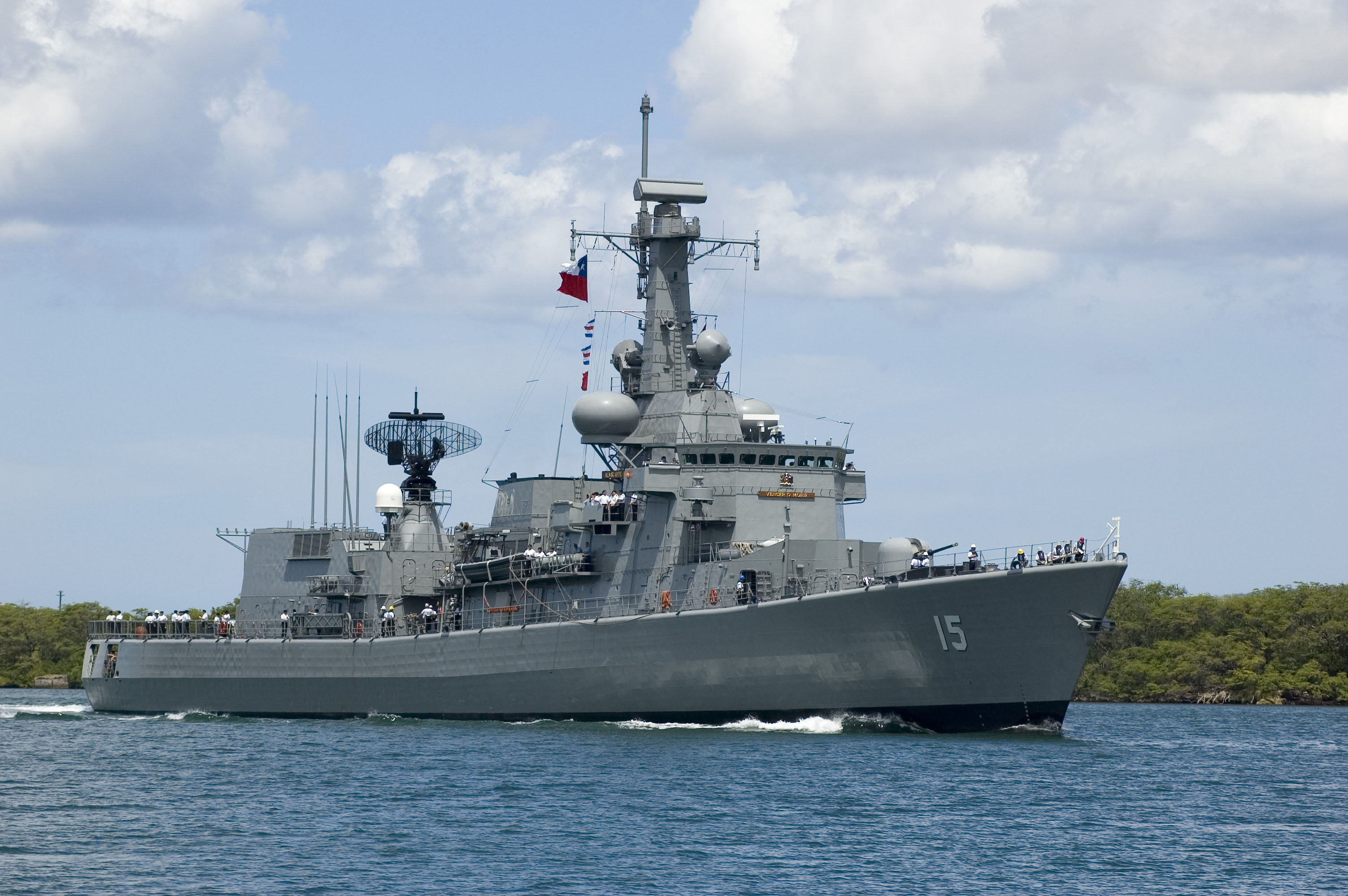
Almirante Blanco Encalada
(Karel Doorman class)

=== Minor surface combatants ===
Class	In service	Ship	No.	Comm.	Displacement	Type	Builder	Note
Patrols
OPV-80 class	4	Piloto Pardo	OPV-81	2007	1,728 to 1,810 t	Offshore patrol vessel	ASMAR, Talcahuano, Chile	
OPV-80 class	4	Comandante Toro	OPV-82	2008	1,728 to 1,810 t	Offshore patrol vessel	ASMAR, Talcahuano, Chile	
OPV-80 class	4	Marinero Fuentealba	OPV-83	2014	1,728 to 1,810 t	Offshore patrol vessel	ASMAR, Talcahuano, Chile	
OPV-80 class	4	Cabo Odger	OPV-84	2017	1,728 to 1,810 t	Offshore patrol vessel	ASMAR, Talcahuano, Chile	
Taitao class	4	Contramaestre Micalvi	PSG-71	1993	510 to 533 t	Large patrol craft	ASMAR, Talcahuano, Chile	
Taitao class	4	Contramaestre Ortiz	PSG-72	1993	510 to 533 t	Large patrol craft	ASMAR, Talcahuano, Chile	
Taitao class	4	Aspirante Isaza	PSG-73	1994	510 to 533 t	Large patrol craft	ASMAR, Talcahuano, Chile	
Taitao class	4	Piloto Sibbald	PSG-78	1996	510 to 533 t	Large patrol craft	ASMAR, Talcahuano, Chile	
Sa'ar 4 class (Reshef class)	3	Casma	LAM-30	1979^{(s)}	450 t	Fast attack craft	Israel Shipyards, Haifa, Israel	
Sa'ar 4 class (Reshef class)	3	Chipana	LAM-31	1980^{(s)}	450 t	Fast attack craft	Israel Shipyards, Haifa, Israel	
Sa'ar 4 class (Reshef class)	3	Angamos	LAM-34	1997^{(s)}	450 t	Fast attack craft	Israel Shipyards, Haifa, Israel	
Protector class	16	Aysén	LSG-1609	1999	110 to 125 t	Coastal patrol craft	ASMAR, Talcahuano, Chile	
Protector class	16	Corral	LSG-1610	2000	110 to 125 t	Coastal patrol craft	ASMAR, Talcahuano, Chile	
Protector class	16	Concepción	LSG-1611	2000	110 to 125 t	Coastal patrol craft	ASMAR, Talcahuano, Chile	
Protector class	16	San Antonio	LSG-1613	2000	110 to 125 t	Coastal patrol craft	ASMAR, Talcahuano, Chile	
Protector class	16	Caldera	LSG-1612	2001	110 to 125 t	Coastal patrol craft	ASMAR, Talcahuano, Chile	
Protector class	16	Antofagasta	LSG-1614	2001	110 to 125 t	Coastal patrol craft	ASMAR, Talcahuano, Chile	
Protector class	16	Arica	LSG-1615	2001	110 to 125 t	Coastal patrol craft	ASMAR, Talcahuano, Chile	
Protector class	16	Coquimbo	LSG-1616	2001	110 to 125 t	Coastal patrol craft	ASMAR, Talcahuano, Chile	
Protector class	16	Puerto Natales	LSG-1617	2001	110 to 125 t	Coastal patrol craft	ASMAR, Talcahuano, Chile	
Protector class	16	Valparaíso	LSG-1618	2002	110 to 125 t	Coastal patrol craft	ASMAR, Talcahuano, Chile	
Protector class	16	Punta Arenas	LSG-1619	2002	110 to 125 t	Coastal patrol craft	ASMAR, Talcahuano, Chile	
Protector class	16	Talcahuano	LSG-1620	2002	110 to 125 t	Coastal patrol craft	ASMAR, Talcahuano, Chile	
Protector class	16	Quintero	LSG-1621	2003	110 to 125 t	Coastal patrol craft	ASMAR, Talcahuano, Chile	
Protector class	16	Chiloé	LSG-1622	2003	110 to 125 t	Coastal patrol craft	ASMAR, Talcahuano, Chile	
Protector class	16	Puerto Montt	LSG-1623	2003	110 to 125 t	Coastal patrol craft	ASMAR, Talcahuano, Chile	
Protector class	16	Iquique	LSG-1624	2004	110 to 125 t	Coastal patrol craft	ASMAR, Talcahuano, Chile	
Ona class	1	Ona	LSG-1625	2011^{(s)}	110 t	Coastal patrol craft	Asenav, Valdivia, Chile	
Alacalufe class	2	Alacalufe	LSG-1603	1989	107 t	Coastal patrol craft	ASMAR, Punta Arenas, Chile	
Alacalufe class	2	Hallef	LSG-1604	1989	107 t	Coastal patrol craft	ASMAR, Talcahuano, Chile	
Dabur class	4	Grumete Díaz	LPC-1814	1990^{(s)}	40 t	Coastal patrol craft	Sewart Seacraft, US / IAI, Israel	
Dabur class	4	Grumete Salinas	LPC-1816	1991^{(s)}	40 t	Coastal patrol craft	Sewart Seacraft, US / IAI, Israel	
Dabur class	4	Grumete Machado	LPC-1820	1995^{(s)}	40 t	Coastal patrol craft	Sewart Seacraft, US / IAI, Israel	
Dabur class	4	Grumete Hudson	LPC-1823	1995^{(s)}	40 t	Coastal patrol craft	Sewart Seacraft, US / IAI, Israel	
Type 44	6	Pelluhue	LSR-1703	2001^{(s)}	17.9 t	Small patrol boat	Coast Guard Yard, Curtis Bay, Baltimore, US	
Type 44	6	Arauco	LSR-1704	2001^{(s)}	17.9 t	Small patrol boat	Coast Guard Yard, Curtis Bay, Baltimore, US	
Type 44	6	Chacao	LSR-1705	2001^{(s)}	17.9 t	Small patrol boat	Coast Guard Yard, Curtis Bay, Baltimore, US	
Type 44	6	Queitao	LSR-1706	2001^{(s)}	17.9 t	Small patrol boat	Coast Guard Yard, Curtis Bay, Baltimore, US	
Type 44	6	Guaiteca	LSR-1707	2001^{(s)}	17.9 t	Small patrol boat	Coast Guard Yard, Curtis Bay, Baltimore, US	
Type 44	6	Curaumilla	LSR-1708	2001^{(s)}	17.9 t	Small patrol boat	Coast Guard Yard, Curtis Bay, Baltimore, US	

There are also small patrol boats built by the American company SAFE Boats International in Port Orchard, Washington, which are named and identified only by their pennant number:

- Twenty-six Archangel-class patrol boats (13 tons), of which fourteen are of the maritime patrol version (LPM-4400 to 4413) and twelve of the self-righting version for rescue services (LSR-4420 to 4431), which were acquired between 2008 and 2014.
- Thirty-one Defender-class patrol boats (4.2 tons), of which sixteen were acquired between 2007 and 2012 (PM-2501 to 2515, and PM-2700), and another fifteen of the Defender 25 model incorporated between 2018 and 2020 (PM-2516 to 2530). These last units were co-produced by the American company, which designed them, and ASMAR, Valparaíso.

There is a cooperation agreement between SERNAPESCA and the Chilean Navy for the latter institution to operate the Pumar inspection boat model WR1250 Explorer called Guerrero PM-1250, built by ASMAR, Valparaíso and commissioned in 2020.

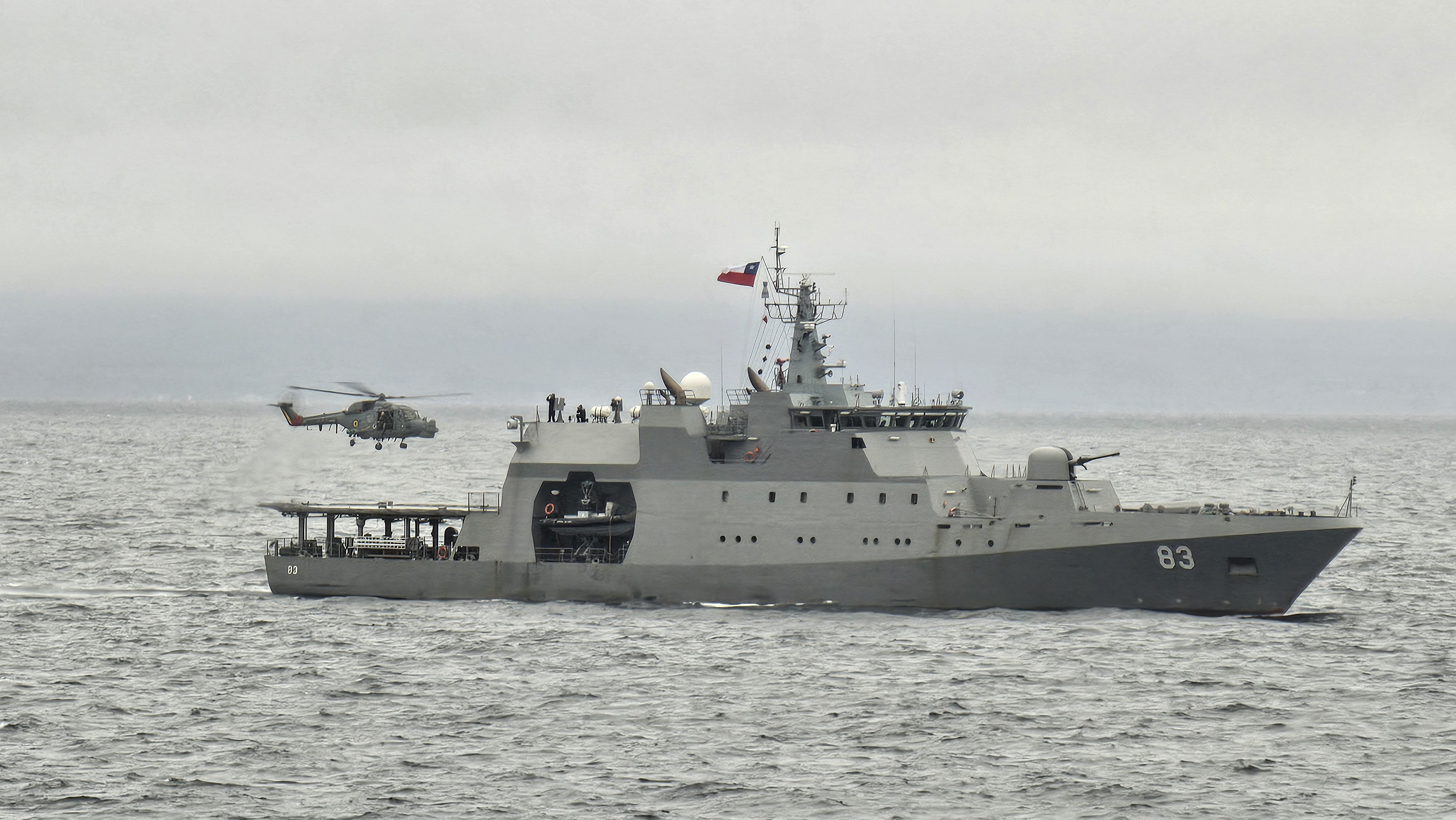
Marinero Fuentealba
(OPV-80 class)

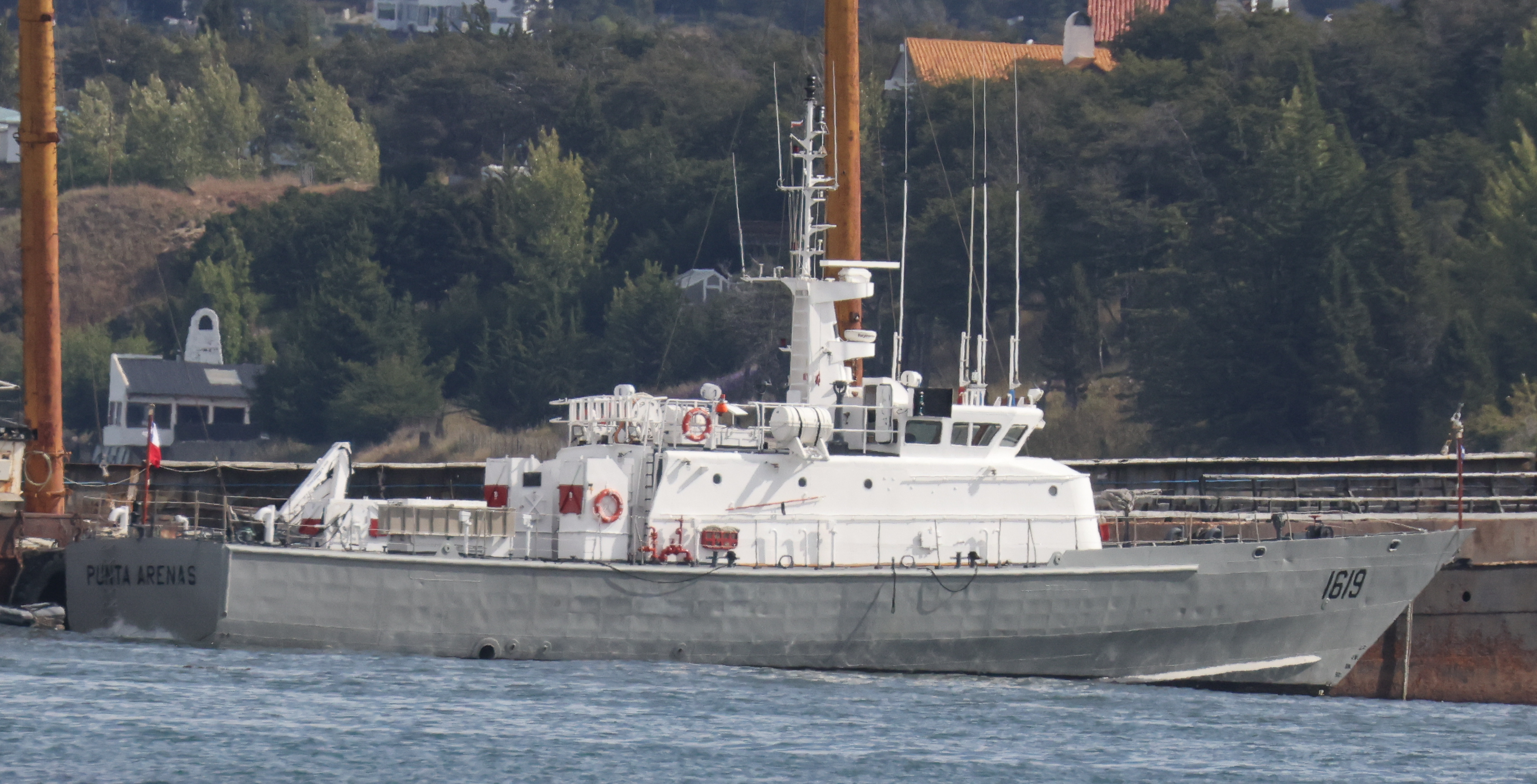
LSG-1619 Punta Arenas
(Protector class)

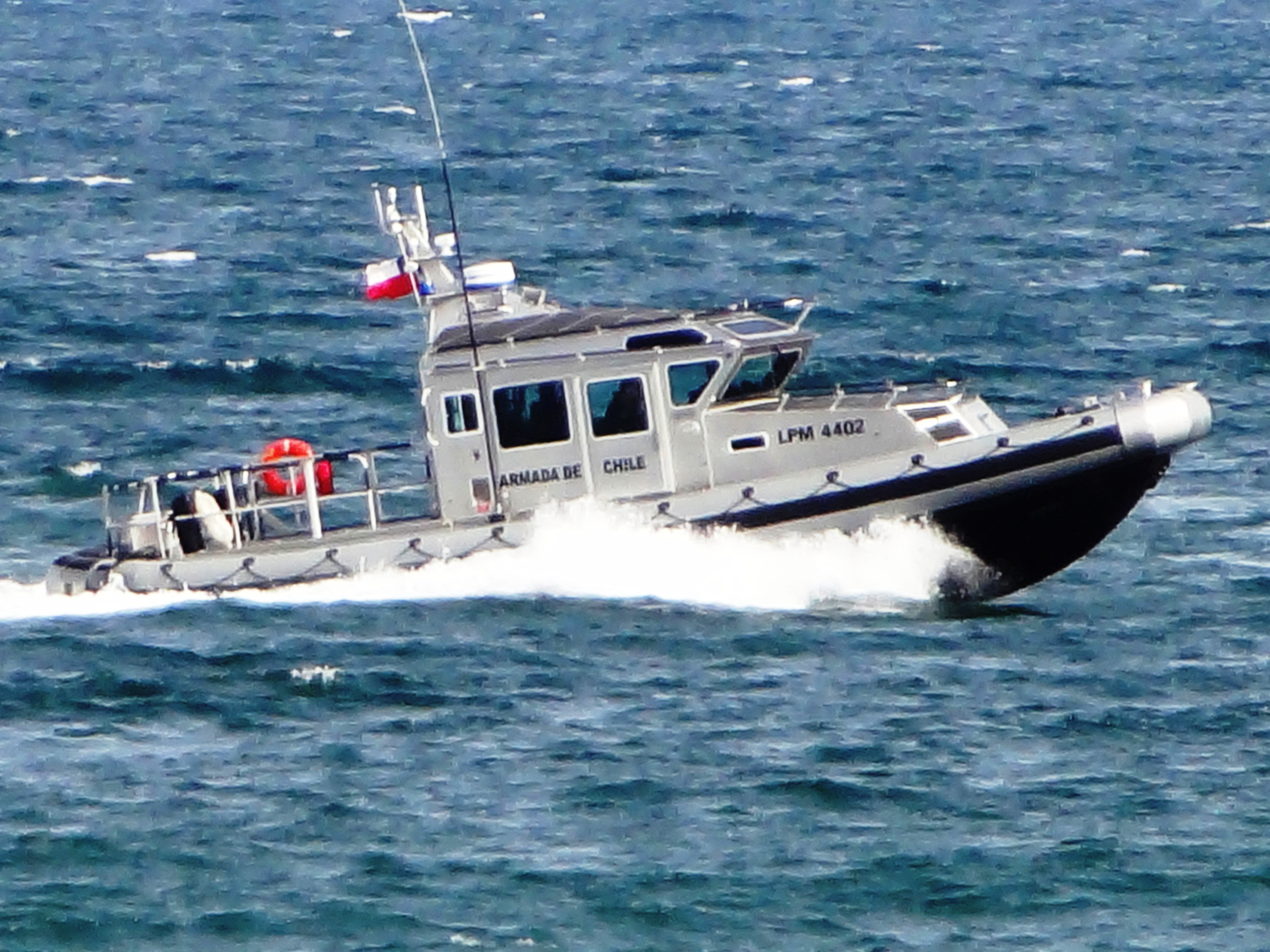
LPM-4402
(Archangel class)

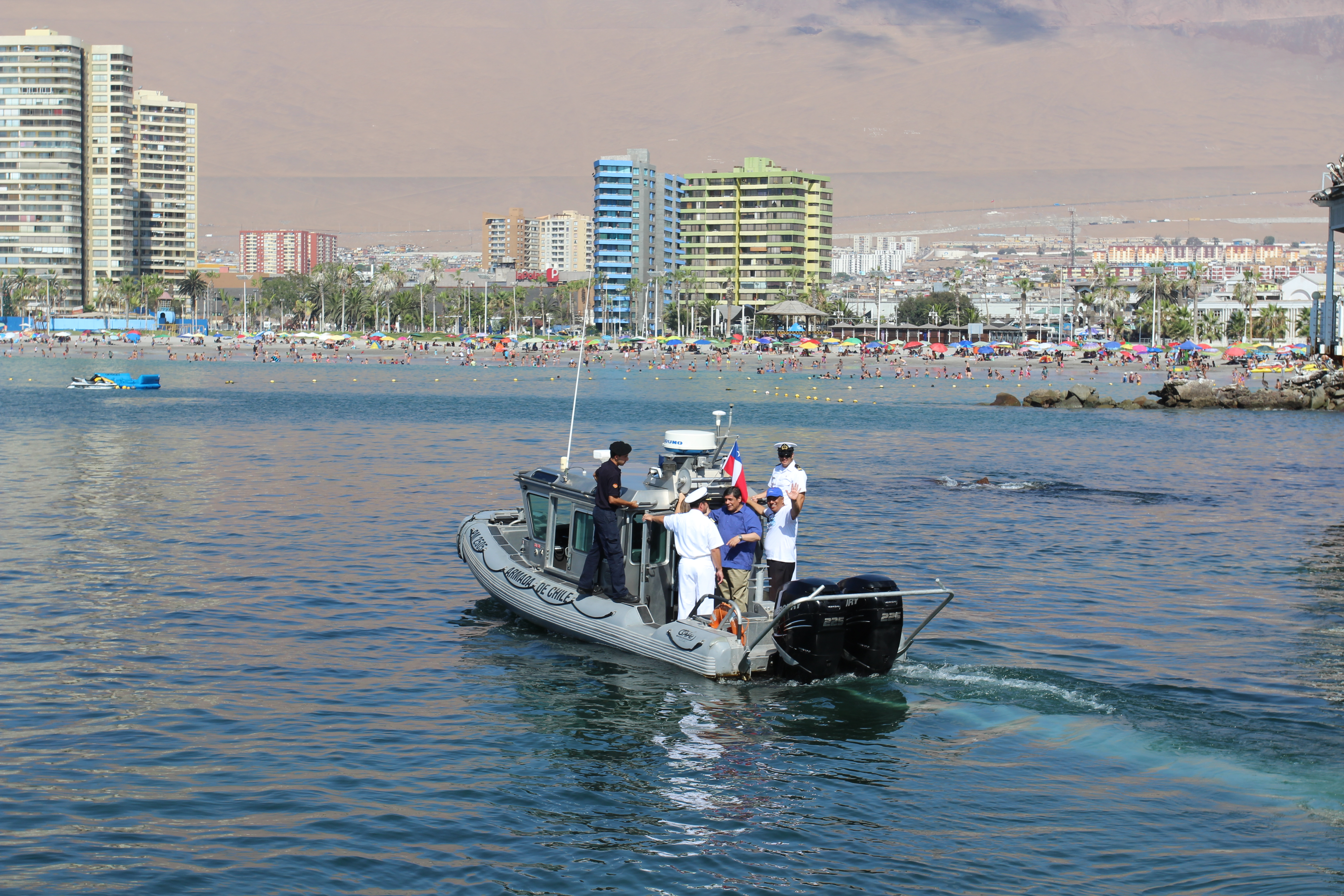
PM-2505
(Defender class)

=== Amphibious forces ===
Class	In service	Ship	No.	Comm.	Displacement	Type	Builder	Note
Amphibious ships
Foudre class	1	Sargento Aldea	LSDH-91	2011^{(s)}	12,599 t	LPD	DCN, Brest, France	
BATRAL class	2	Rancagua	LST-92	1983	1,409 t	LST	ASMAR, Talcahuano, Chile	
BATRAL class	2	Chacabuco	LST-95	1986	1,409 t	LST	ASMAR, Talcahuano, Chile	
Elicura class	1	Elicura	LSM-90	1968	780 t	LSM	ASMAR, Talcahuano, Chile	

There are also three second-hand support landing ships that were acquired from France in 2011 together with the landing platform dock (LPD). These are the LCU Soldado Canave of the CDIC class (750 tons); built by SFCN in Villeneuve-la-Garenne, and the LCM Cabo Reyes and Soldado Fuentes of the CTM class (152 tons); both built by CMN in Cherbourg.

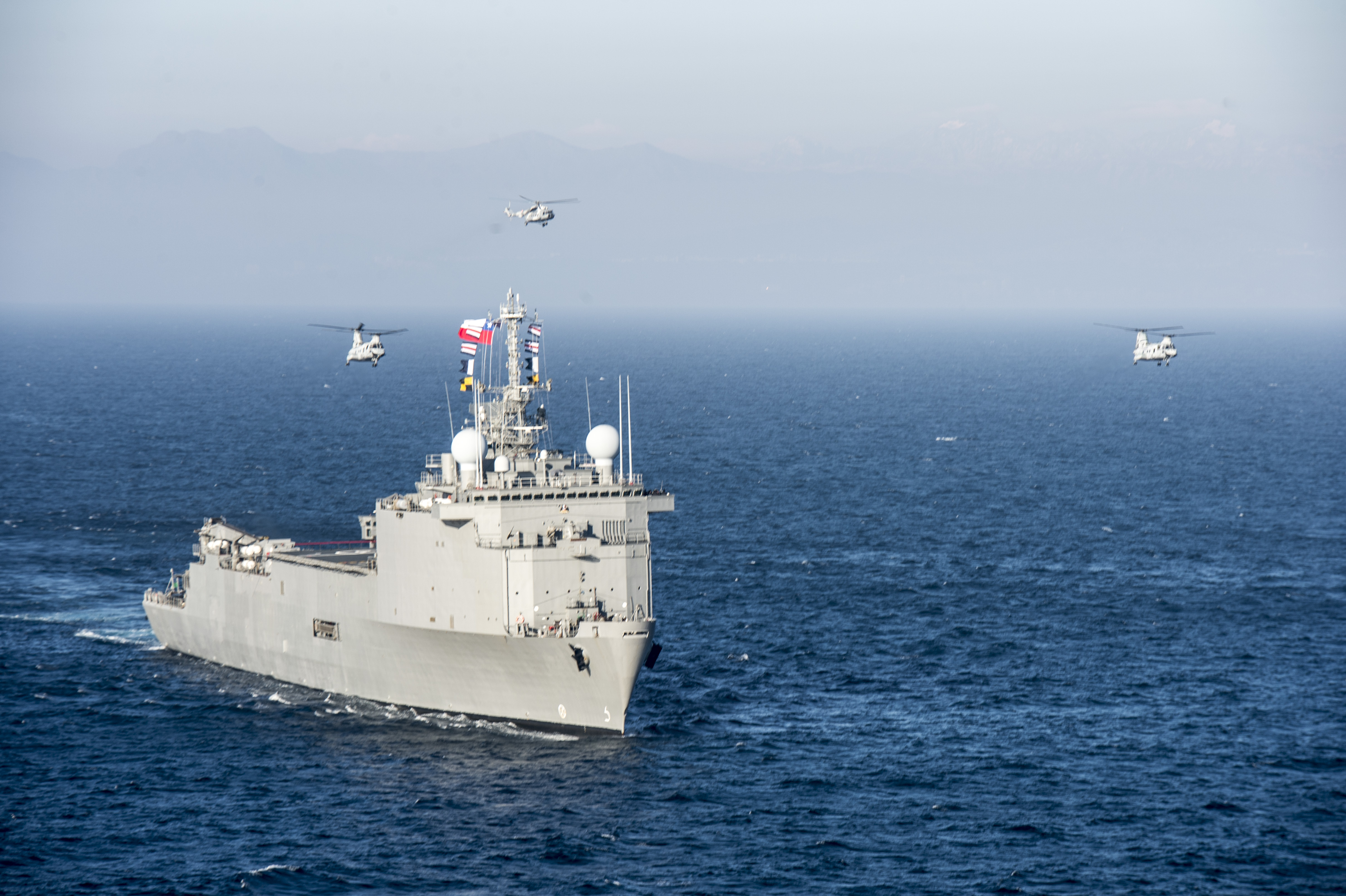
Sargento Aldea
(Foudre class)

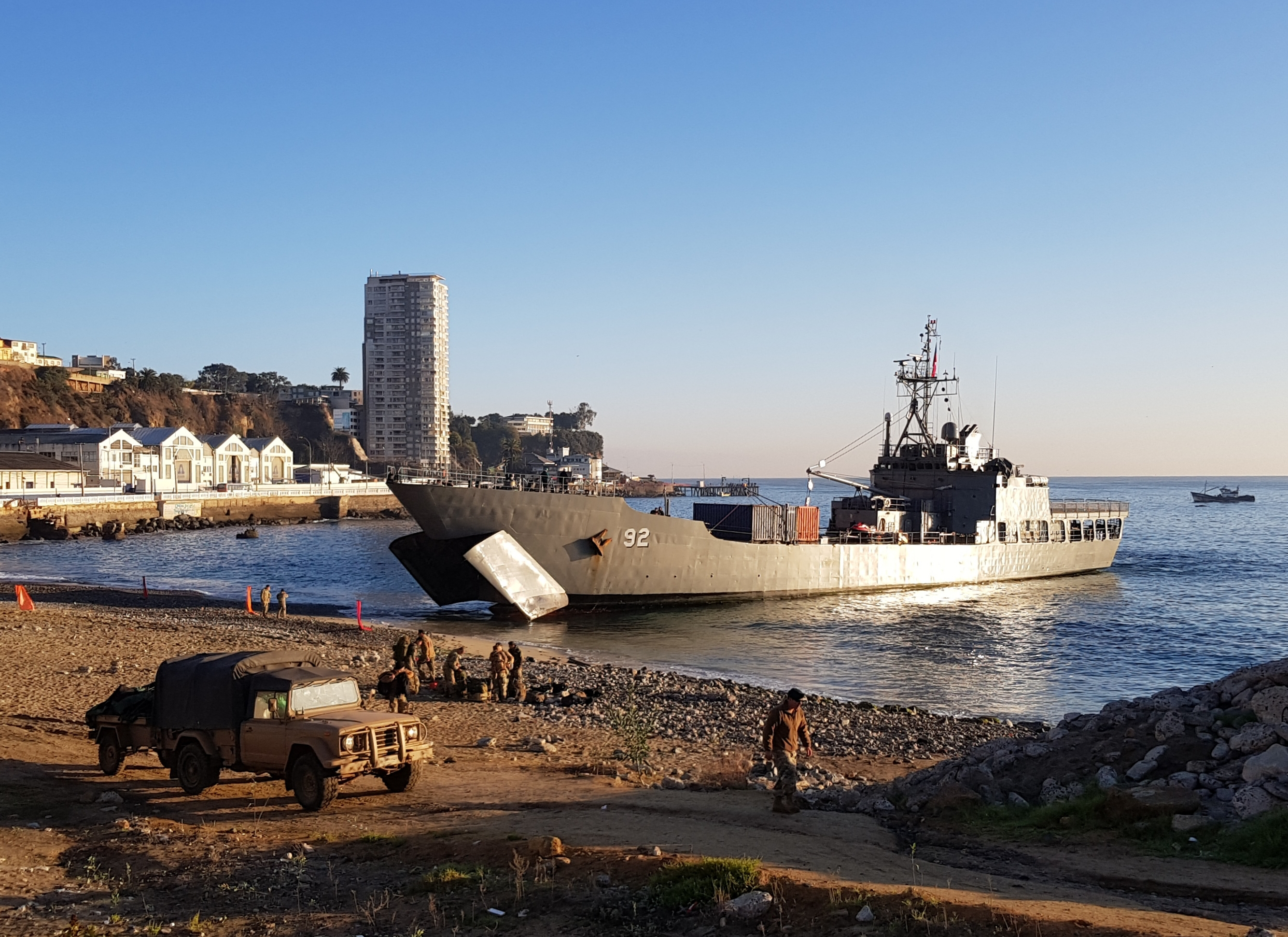
Rancagua
(BATRAL class)

=== Survey vessels ===
Class	In service	Ship	No.	Comm.	Displacement	Type	Builder	Note
Antarctic multipurpose vessel
—	1	Almirante Viel	AGB-46	2024	10,500 t	Icebreaker	ASMAR, Talcahuano, Chile	
Research vessels
—	1	Cabo de Hornos	AGS-61	2013	3,068 t	Oceanographic ship	ASMAR, Talcahuano, Chile	
Taitao class	1	Corneta Cabrales	PSH-77	1996	532 t	Hydrographic patrol ship	ASMAR, Talcahuano, Chile	
Rescue and salvage vessel
—	1	Ingeniero Slight	BRS-63	1997^{(s)}	1,210 t	Buoy tender	B.V.J. Pattje Scheepswerf, Waterhuizen, Netherlands	

There are also two small support boats for shallow water research work; the boat Albatros LH-01, acquired in 2008, and the boat Orca LH-02 of the Defender-class, acquired in 2015 from the American company SAFE Boats International.

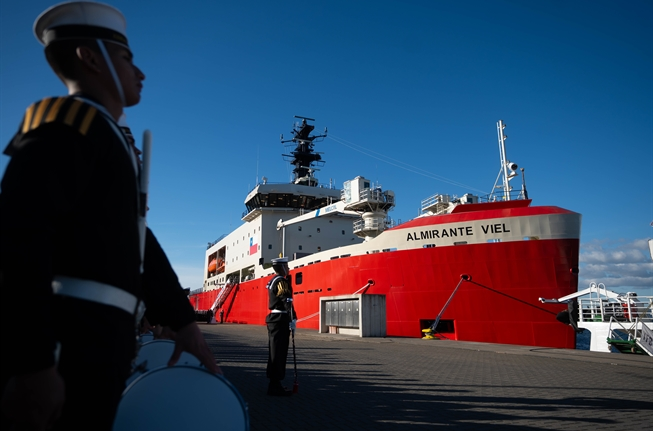
Almirante Viel

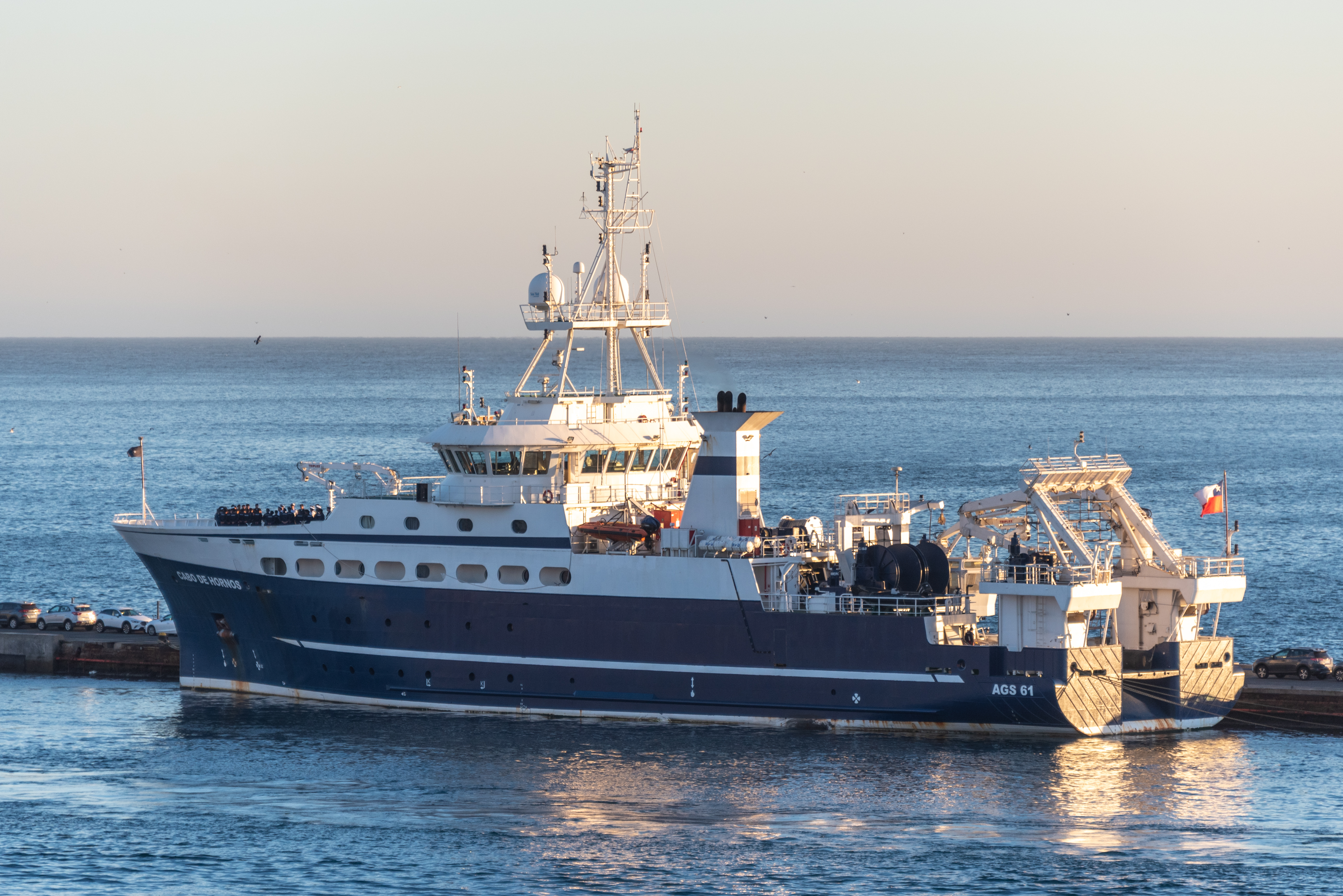
Cabo de Hornos

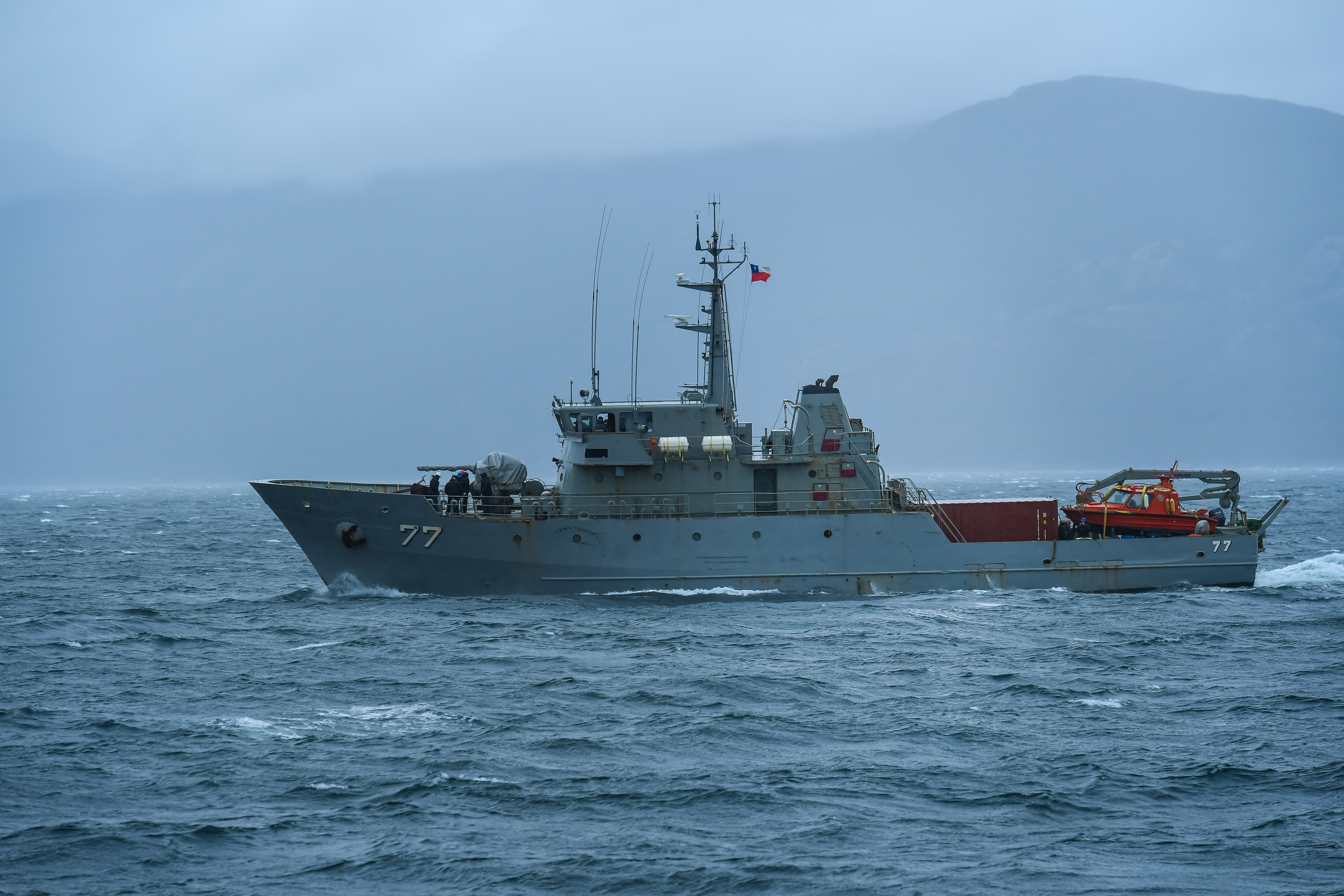
Corneta Cabrales
(Taitao class)

=== Auxiliary vessels ===
Class	In service	Ship	No.	Comm.	Displacement	Type	Builder	Note
Oil supply ships
Henry J. Kaiser class	1	Almirante Montt	AO-52	2010^{(s)}	42,000 t	Oiler replenishment	Avondale Shipyard, New Orleans, US	
—	1	Araucano	AO-53	2010^{(s)}	26,000 t	Oiler replenishment	Uddevallavarvet AB, Uddevalla, Sweden	
Offshore tug / supply vessels
—	1	Lientur	ATF-60	2023^{(s)}	5,828 t	AHTSV	Cemre Shipyard, Altınova, Turkey	
—	1	Janequeo	ATF-65	2021	5,742 t	AHTSV	L&T, Chennai, India	
Veritas class	1	Galvarino	ATF-66	1987^{(s)}	1,800 t	Tugboat	Aukra Bruk, Aukra Municipality, Norway	
Support transport
—	1	Aquiles	AP-41	1988	4,760 t	Troopship / freighter	ASMAR, Talcahuano, Chile	
Support patrol
Taitao class	1	Cirujano Videla	PMD-74	1994	530 t	Medical-dental patrol vessel	ASMAR, Talcahuano, Chile	
Personnel tender ships
Meteoro class	1	Grumete Pérez	YFB-116	1974	165 t	Ferry	ASMAR, Talcahuano, Chile	
—	1	Buzo Sobenes	YFB-113	2013^{(s)}	147 t	Catamaran	Asenav, Valdivia, Chile	
—	1	Grumete Bolados	YFB-112	2016^{(s)}	145 t	Catamaran	Asenav, Valdivia, Chile	
Small logistic support vessel
—	1	Guardián Brito	BSG-118	2010^{(s)}	—	Small landing craft	Maestranza Amsu Ltda., Coronel, Chile	

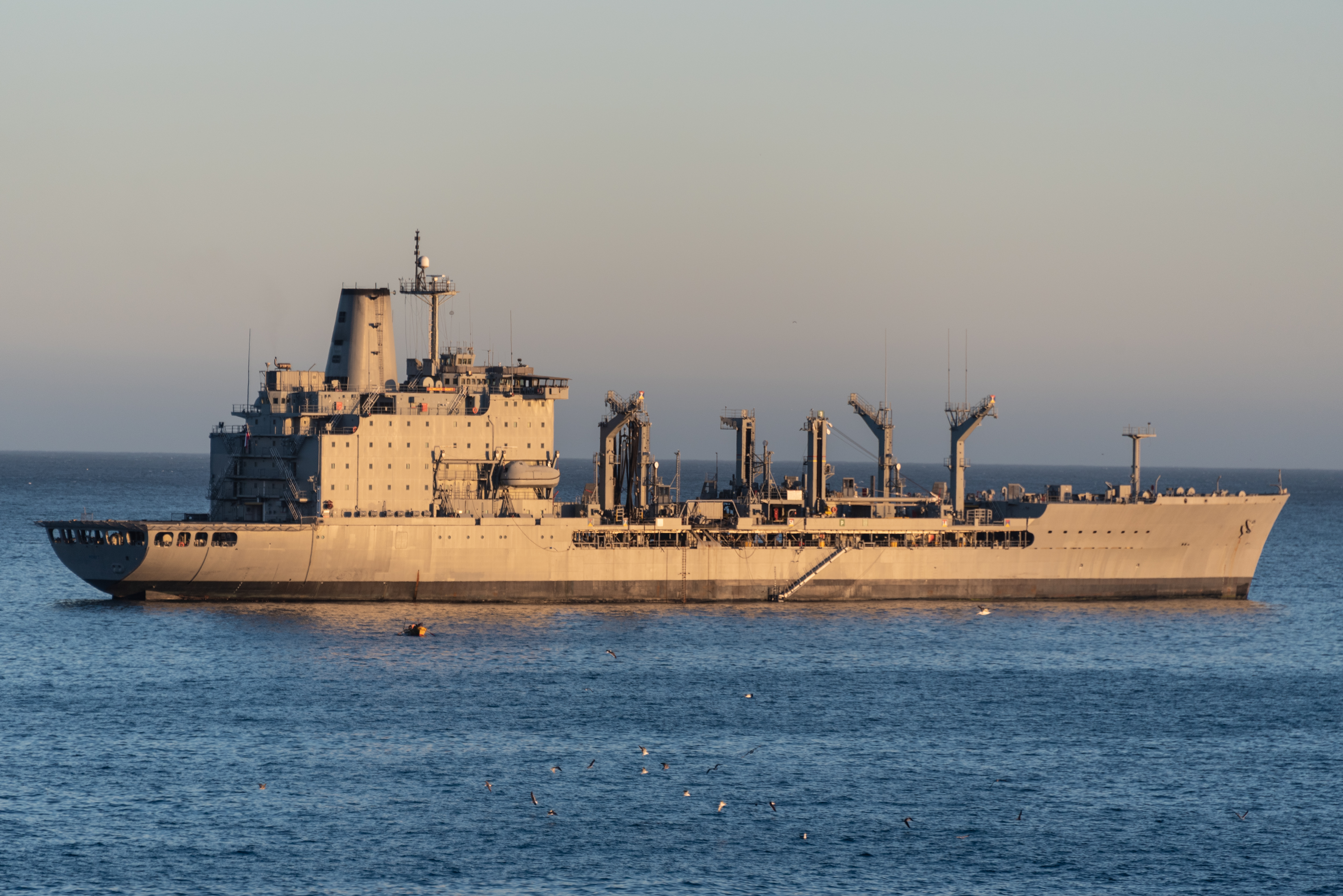
Almirante Montt
(Henry J. Kaiser class)

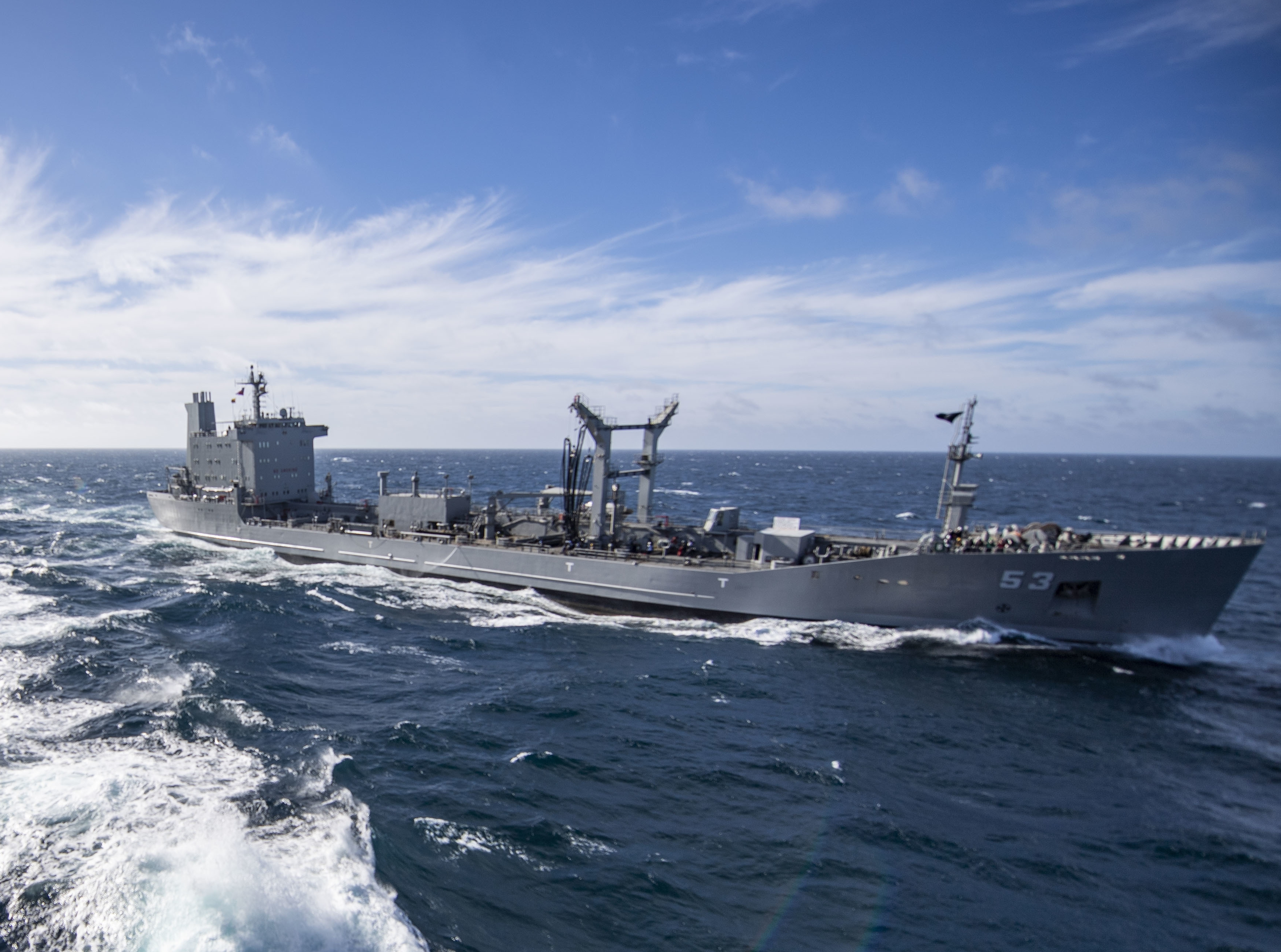
Araucano

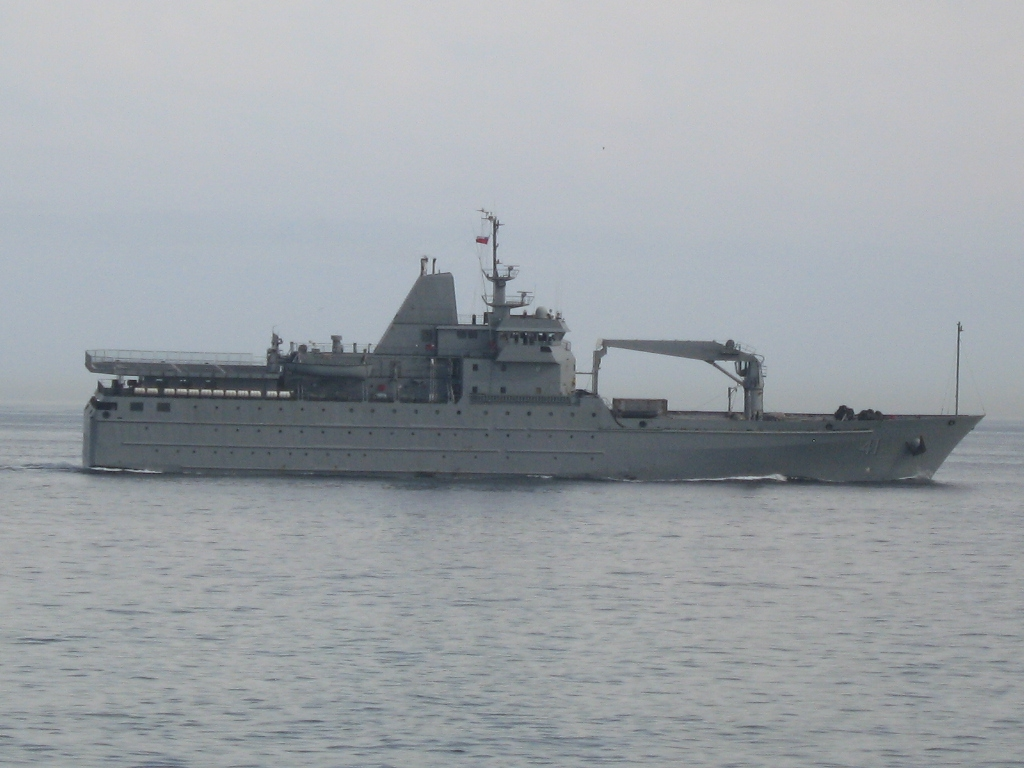
Aquiles

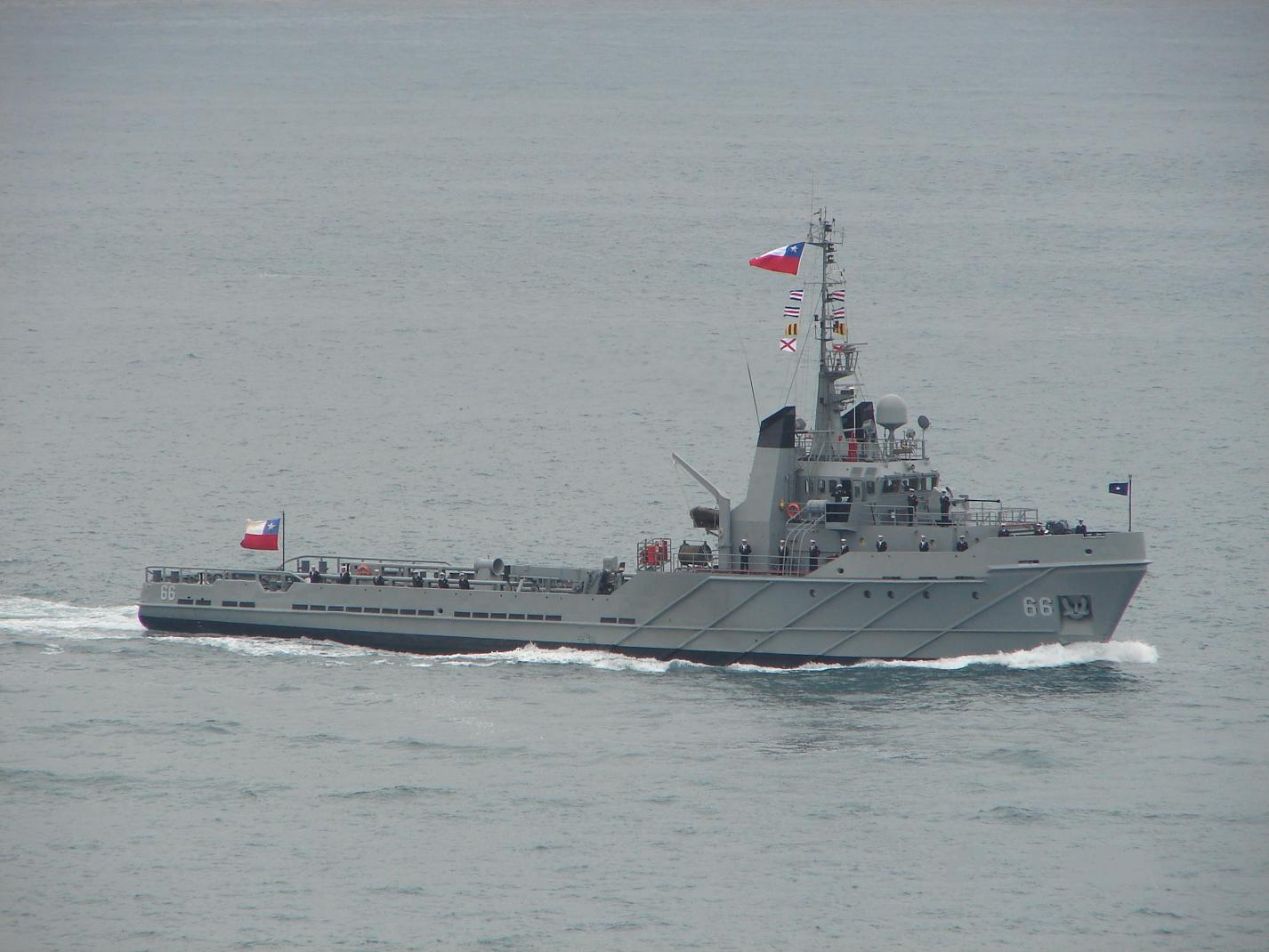
Galvarino
(Veritas class)

=== Training ship ===
Class	In service	Ship	No.	Comm.	Displacement	Type	Builder	Note
Sail training
Juan Sebastián de Elcano class	1	Esmeralda	BE-43	1954	3,673 t	Barquentine tall ship	Bazán, Cádiz, Spain	

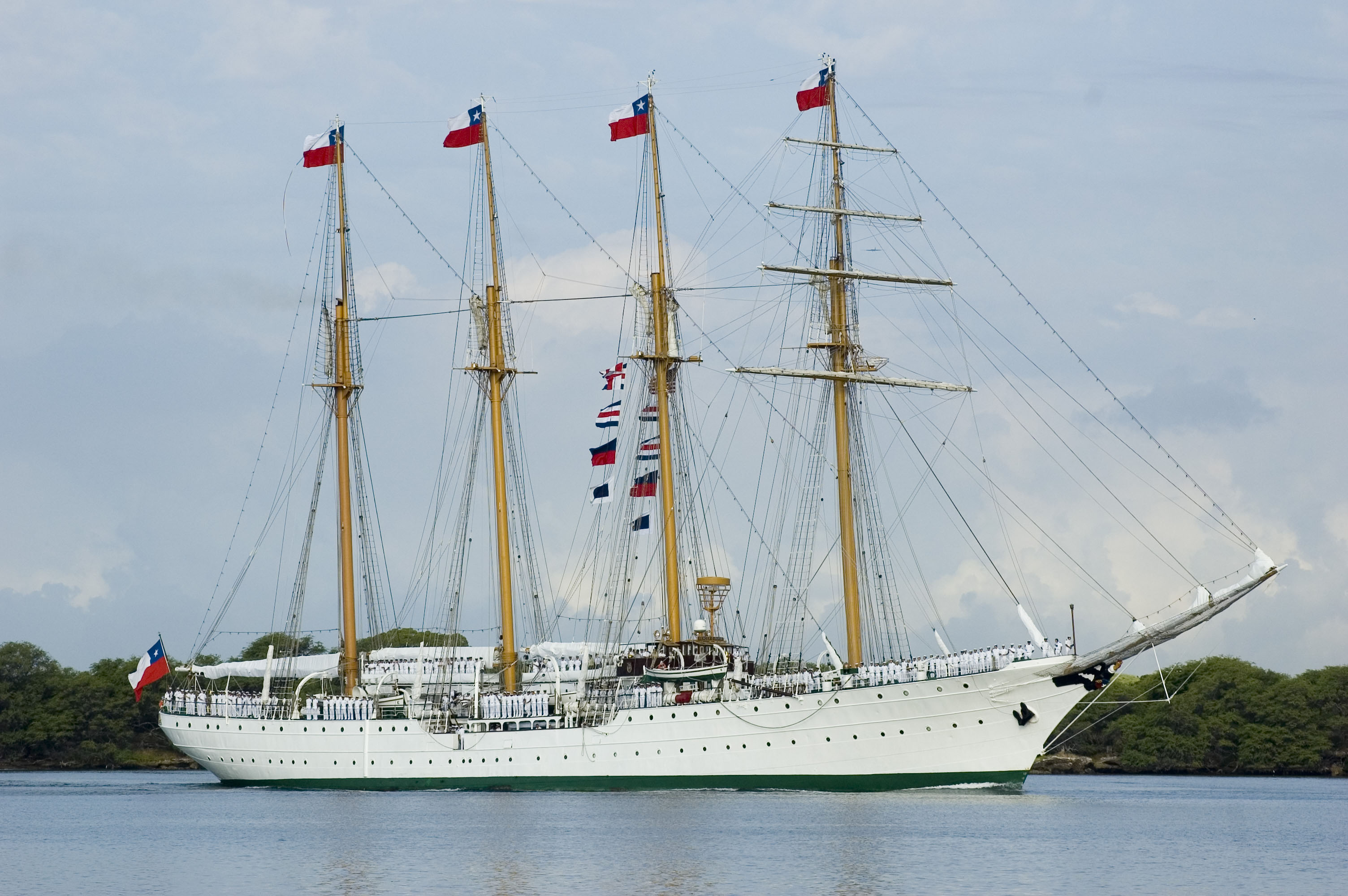
Esmeralda

=== Museum ship ===
Class	In service	Ship	No.	Comm.	Displacement	Type	Builder	Note
Ceremonial / historical ship
—	1	RH Huáscar	—	1879/1934^{(s)} (Note: On 8 October 1879, during the naval campaign of the War of the Pacific, the Peruvian ironclad Huáscar was captured in the battle of Angamos, after which he served in the Chilean Navy. In 1934, she was converted into a historical relic and flagship of the commander of the Second Naval Zone based in Talcahuano.)	1,180 t	Ironclad turret ship	Laird Brothers, Birkenhead, UK	

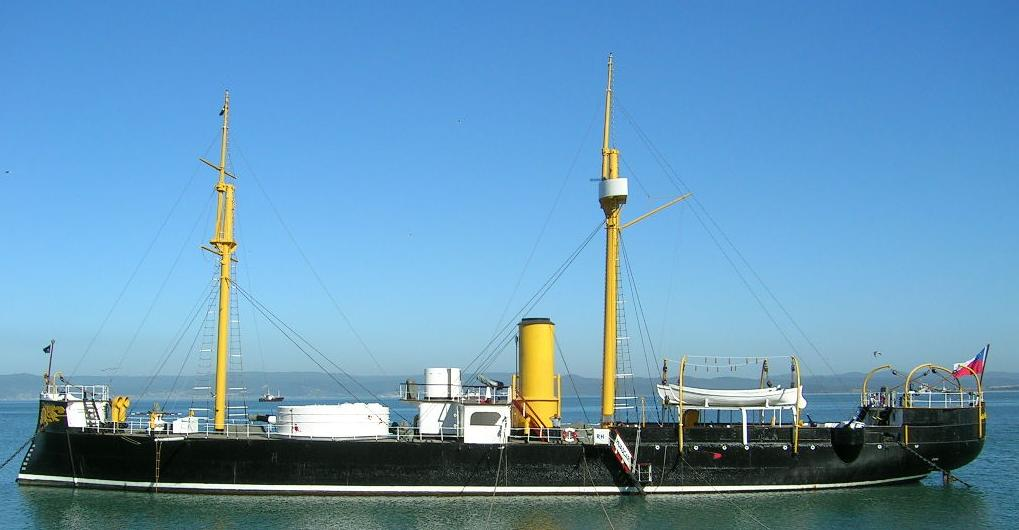
RH Huáscar

== Future ships ==
Only includes units purchased, under construction, or projected that already have financing.

Class	Projected units	Ship	No.	Planned comm.	Displacement	Type	Builder	Note
Amphibious ships
— (Note: Landing craft destined for the Magallanes class LPDs.)	2	Selknam	—	2026	—	LCM	Asenav, Valdivia, Chile	
—	2	Manutara	—	2026	—	LCM	Asenav, Valdivia, Chile	
Magallanes (Note: These are the two Chilean multipurpose amphibious transports of the Escotillón IV Phase 1 project of the Chilean Navy.)	2	Magallanes	LPD-93	2027	7,987 t	LPD	ASMAR, Talcahuano, Chile	
Magallanes	2	Rapa Nui	—	2030	7,987 t	LPD	ASMAR, Talcahuano, Chile	

== Watercraft ==
They are small naval units of the Chilean Navy that usually serve as a complement to larger vessels, and that are not included in the previous list. This is due to their particular characteristics, and also they do not have a name or pennant number, and the number of units is unknown.

Name	Type	Manufacturer	Note
Zodiac	Inflatable boat	Zodiac, France	
Pumar	Inflatable boat	ASMAR, Chile	
Skua	Barge	ASMAR, Chile	
SDV Havas Mk 8	Submersible	Havas, France	
—	Water scooter	—	
BTR Sea Doo SAR	Water scooter	BTR, Canada	
BTR Sea Doo Wake Pro 230	Water scooter	BTR, Canada	
NE590	Armored boat	Nuevaera Marine, Uruguay	

== See also ==
- List of current equipment of the Chilean Air Force
- List of current equipment of the Chilean Army
- List of current equipment of the Chilean Navy
- List of active Chile military aircraft
- List of decommissioned ships of the Chilean Navy

== Sources ==
- López, Carlo (1997). "The Sixth "Taitao" Class Patrol Boat Joins the Chilean Navy". Warship International. XXXIIII (4): 381–384. ISSN 0043-0374.
- Bravo Valdivieso, Germán (2006). "Buques de la Armada construidos en Chile" (PDF). Academia de Historia Naval y Marítima de Chile (in Spanish). Valparaíso, Chile.
- Saunders, Stephen, ed. (2015). Jane's Fighting Ships 2015-2016. Jane's Information Group. ISBN 978-0-7106-3143-5.
