= ASMAR =

Chilean shipbuilding company

Astilleros y Maestranzas de la Armada
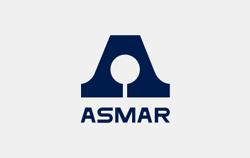
- Type: State-owned company
- Industry: Shipbuilding, defence, engineering
- Founded: April 6, 1960; 66 years ago
- Headquarters: Valparaíso, Chile
- Area served: Worldwide
- Key people: Pablo Niemann Figari (CEO)
- Products: Warships, patrol vessels, auxiliary ships, boats, ferries, fishing vessels, barges, platform supply vessels and other products
- Services: Shipbuilding, repair, maintenance, transformation and modernization of ships
- Revenue: ▲US$180.1 million (2021)
- Owner: State of Chile
- Number of employees: 3,000+ variable per month (2021)
- Subsidiaries: SISDEF; SOCIBER
- Website: www.asmar.cl

The Astilleros y Maestranzas de la Armada (English: Navy Shipyards and Armories), better known by the acronym ASMAR, is a Chilean state-owned shipbuilding company with autonomous administration, which provides services to the Chilean Navy, mainly, and also to other domestic and foreign customers. Its predecessor was Arsenales de Marina, created in 1895, until it was restructured and adopted its current name on April 6, 1960.

It is the largest and most important shipbuilding and repair company in Chile, with three facilities located in Valparaíso, Talcahuano and Punta Arenas. The company's registered office is in Valparaíso, while its main plant is in Talcahuano.

== Products ==
=== Warships ===
- Chilean submarine chaser Papudo
- Future Chilean frigate

=== Patrol vessels ===
- Alacalufe-class patrol craft
- Chilean boat Tokerau
- Taitao-class large patrol craft
- CGS Vigilant
- Protector-class patrol craft
- OPV-80-class offshore patrol vessel
- ICGV Þór
- Defender-class boat (Defender 25 model co-produced with SAFE Boats International)

=== Amphibious and transport ships ===
- Orompello-class landing ship
- BATRAL-class landing ship
- Chilean transport Aquiles
- Magallanes-class landing platform dock

=== Hospital ship ===
- Chilean medical-dental vessel Cirujano Videla

=== Survey vessels ===
- RV Árni Friðriksson
- Chilean research ship Cabo de Hornos

=== Icebreakers ===
- Chilean icebreaker Almirante Viel

=== Other products ===
- Boats
- Ferries
- Oil platform
- Floating dock
- Fishing vessels
- Barges
- Platform supply vessels
- Fénix capsules (built following the 2010 Copiapó mining accident)
- Ventilators (built as a result of the effects of the COVID-19 pandemic in Chile)

== Gallery ==
Patrol vessels
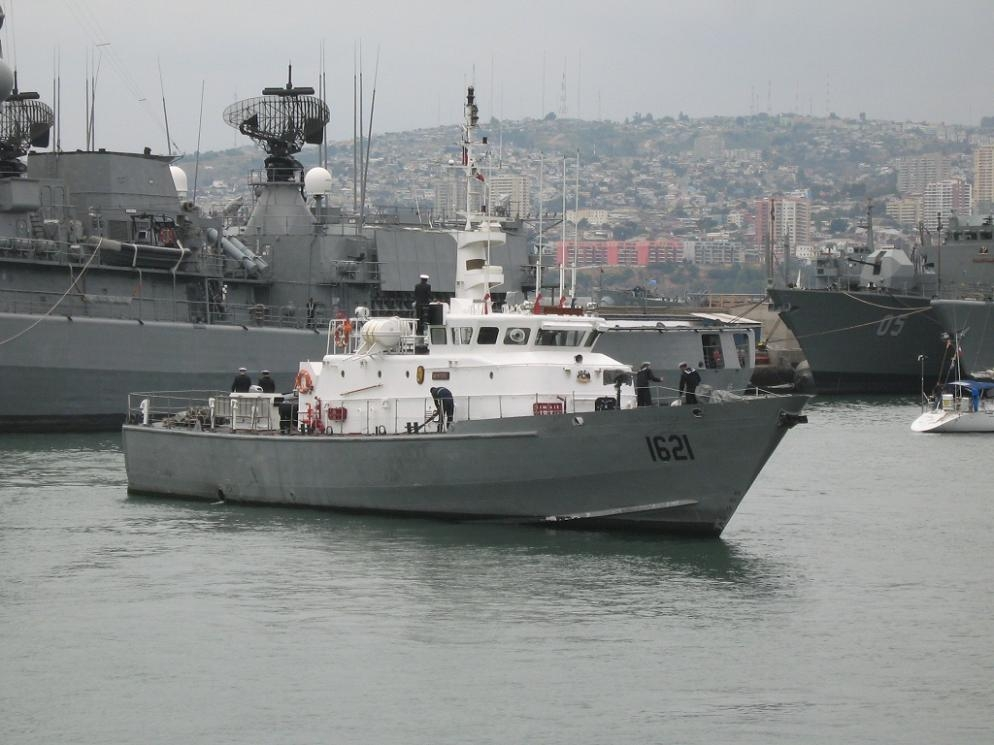
Patrol craft Quintero (LSG-1621), Protector class, Chilean Navy, 2003

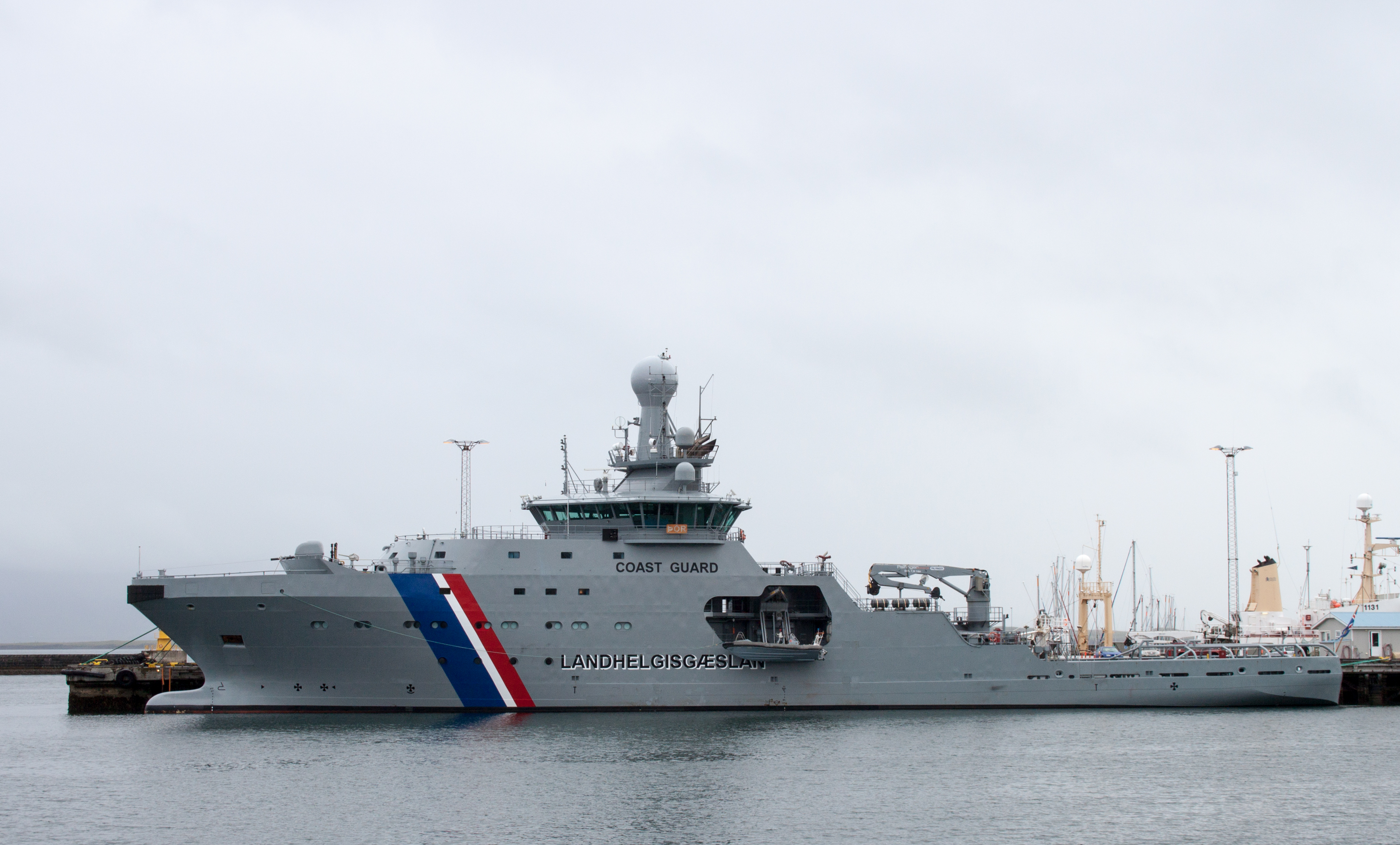
Offshore patrol vessel ICGV Þór, Icelandic Coast Guard, 2011

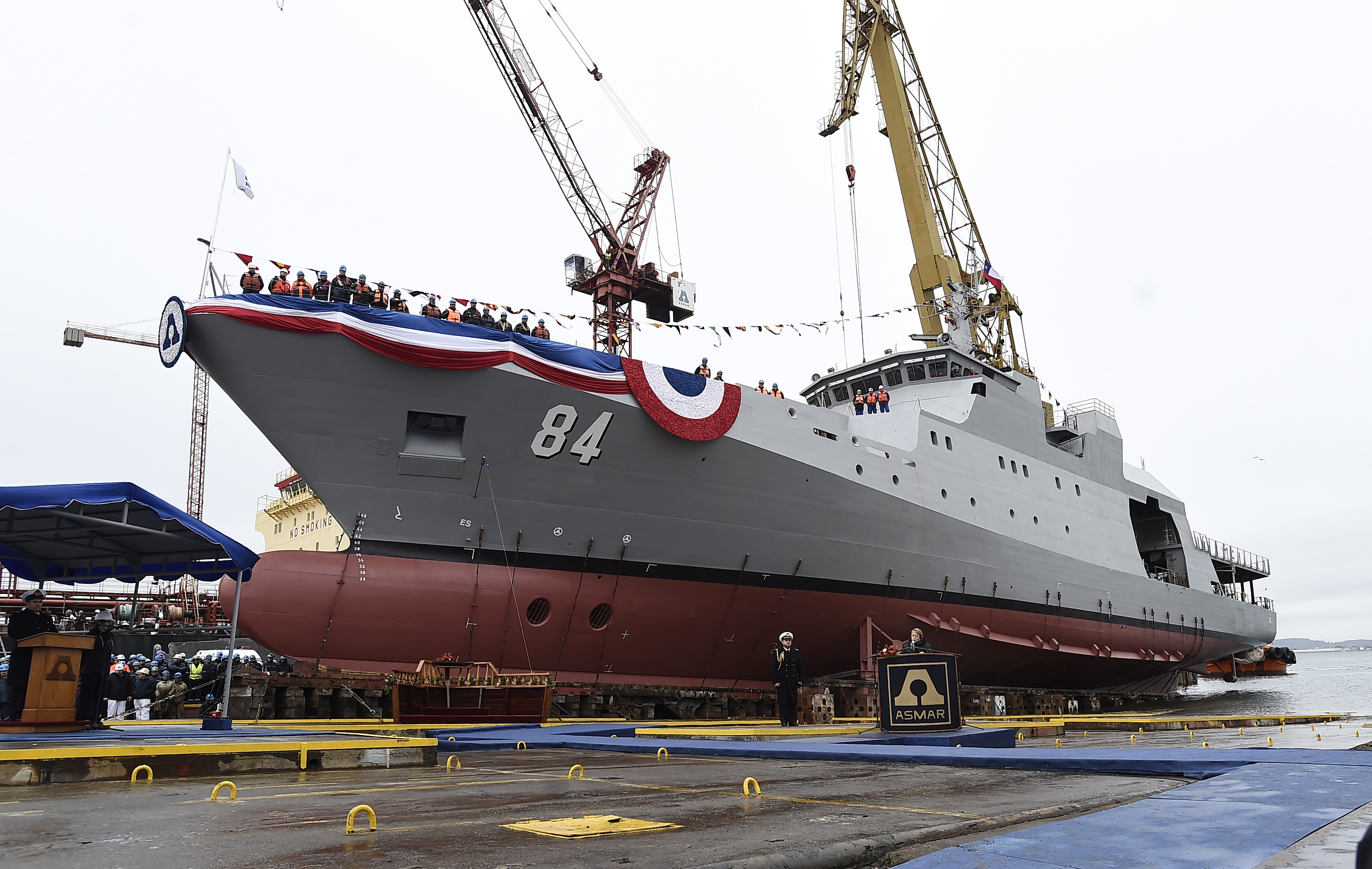
Offshore patrol vessel Cabo Odger (OPV-84), OPV-80 class, Chilean Navy, 2017
Amphibious and transport ships
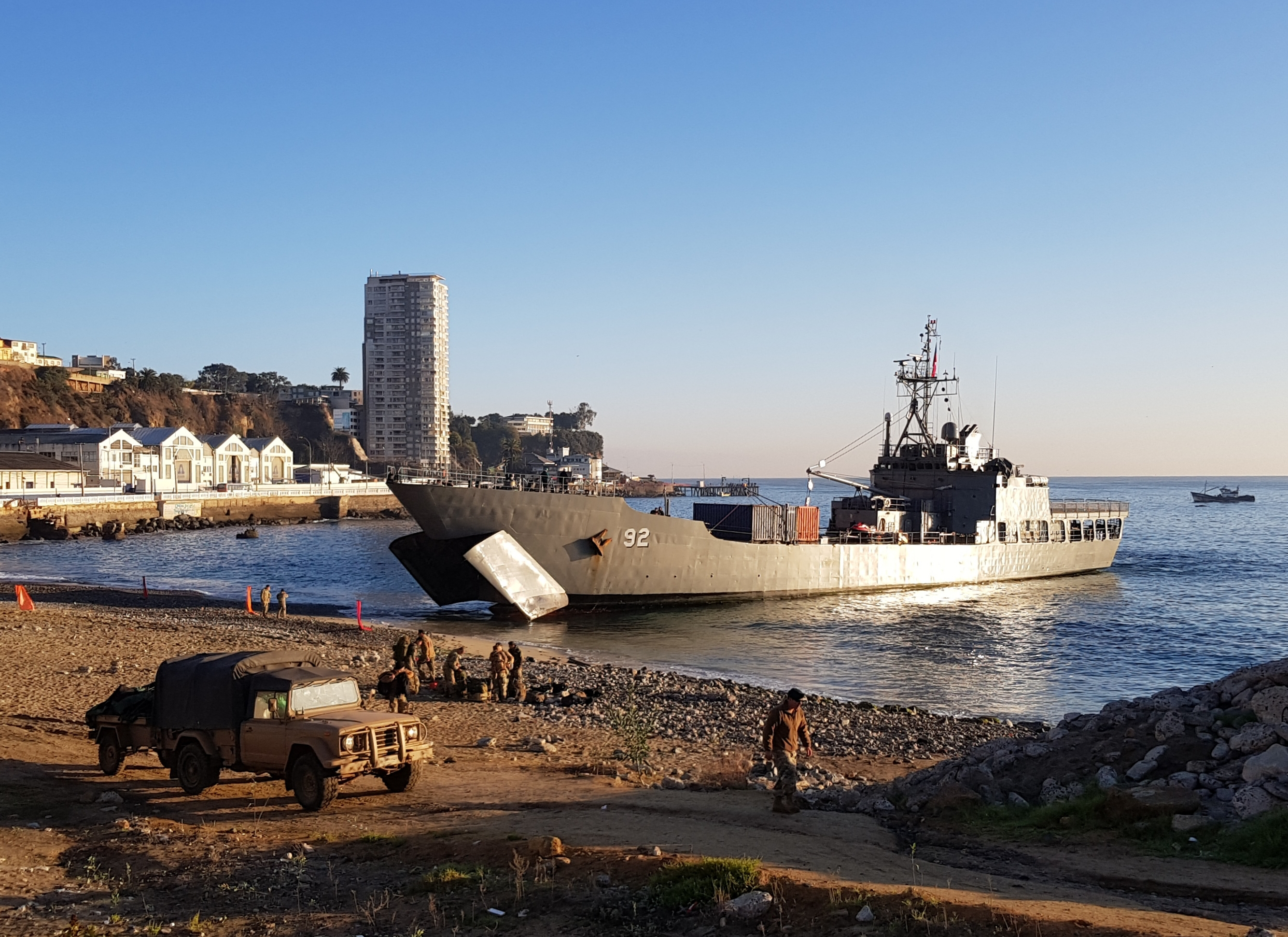
Landing ship Rancagua (LST-92), BATRAL class, Chilean Navy, 1983

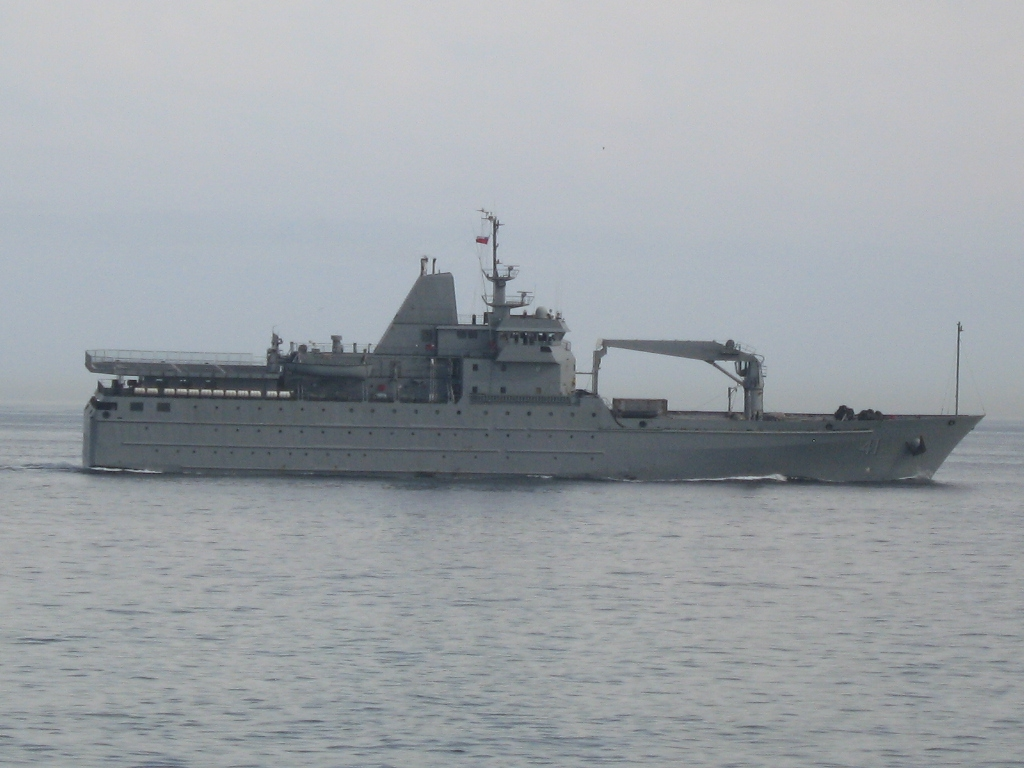
Troopship Aquiles (AP-41), Chilean Navy, 1988
Survey vessels
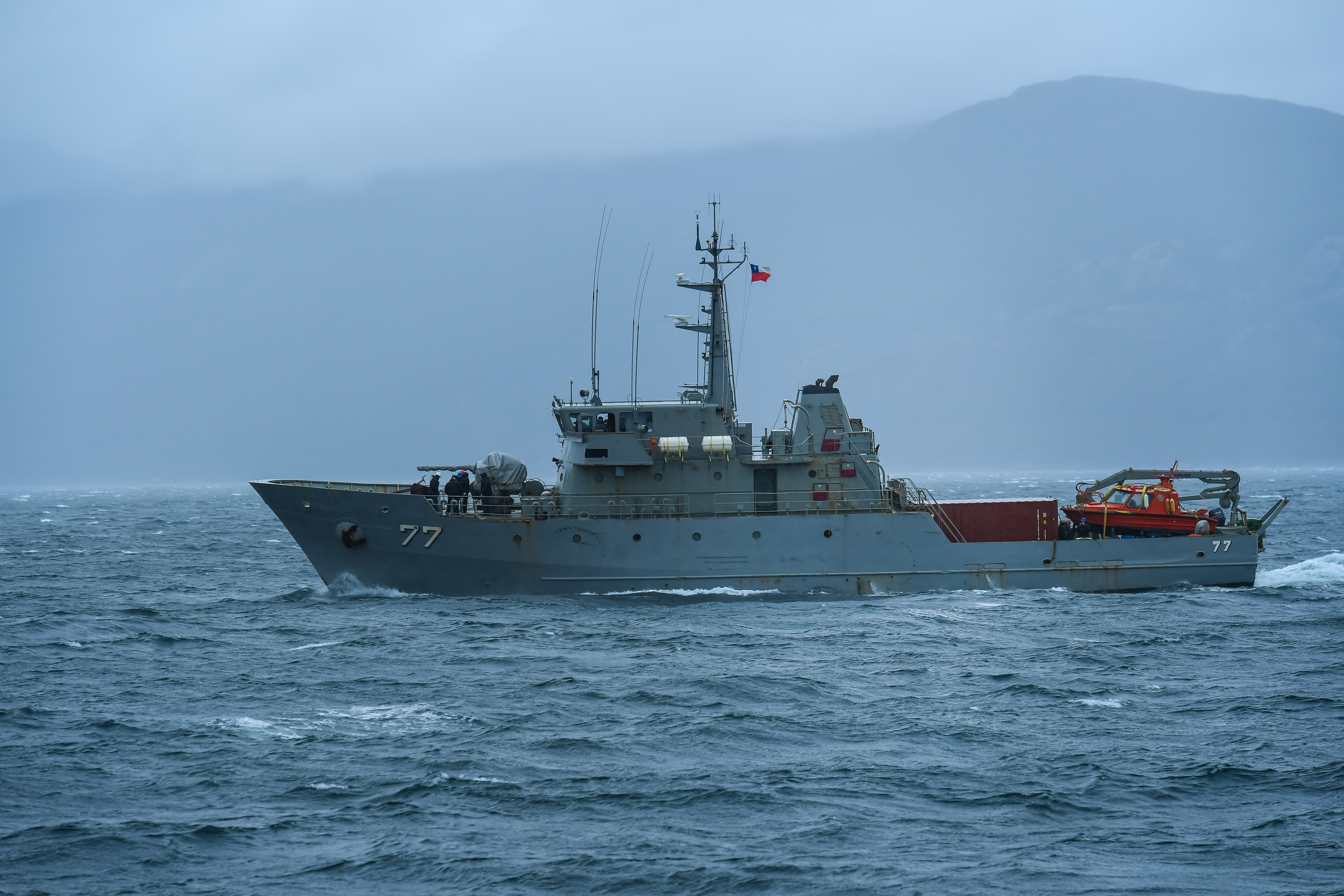
Hydrographic patrol ship Corneta Cabrales (PSH-77), Taitao class, Chilean Navy, 1996 (patrol vessel transformed in 2000)

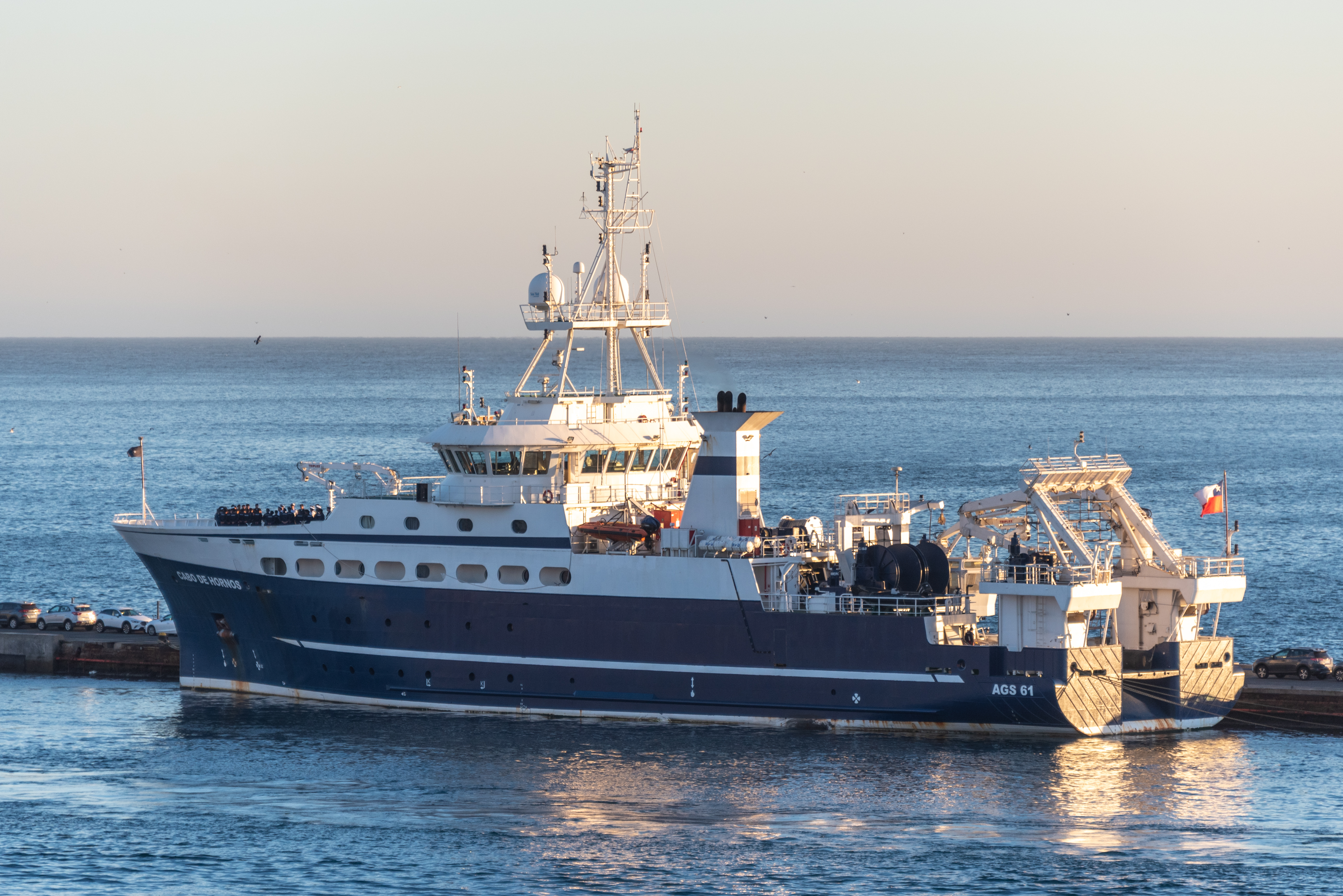
Research ship Cabo de Hornos (AGS-61), Chilean Navy, 2013
Other products
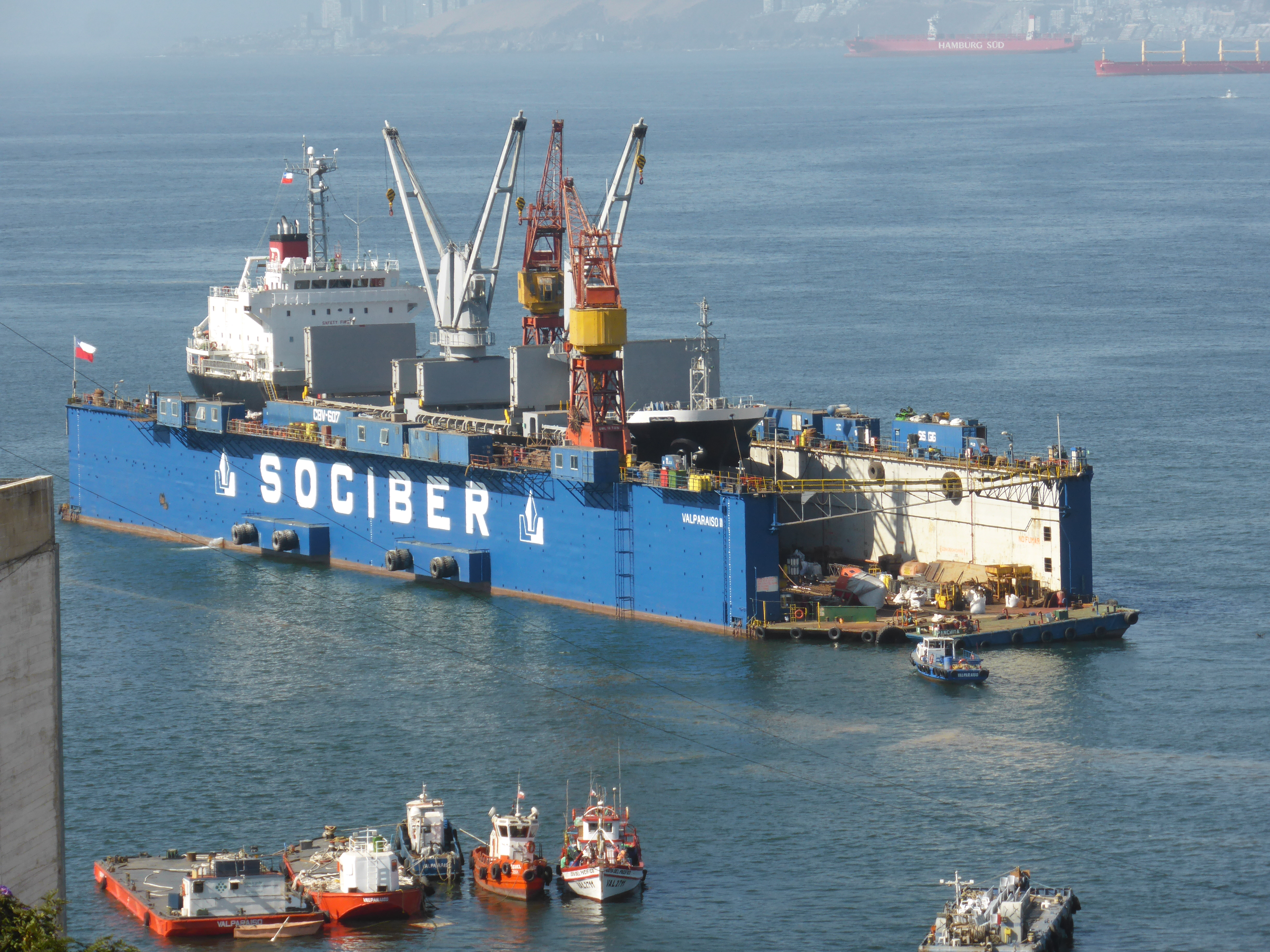
Floating drydock Valparaíso III, SOCIBER company, 1983

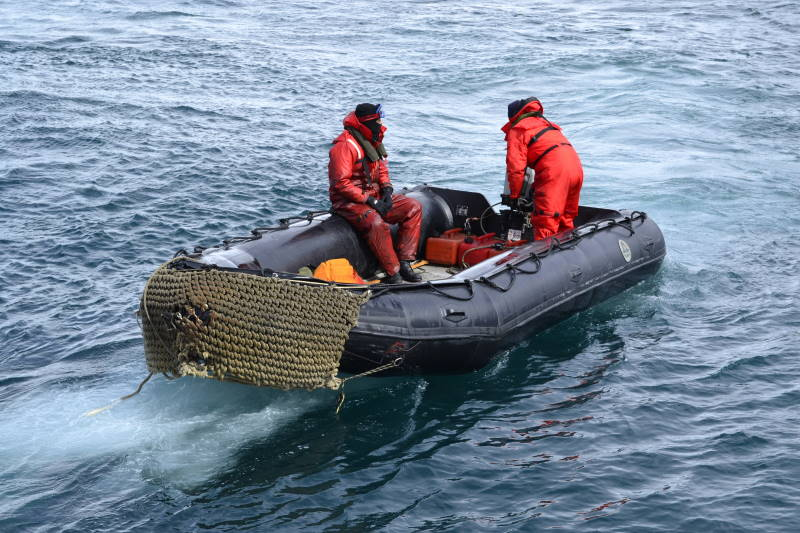
Pumar boat, line of boats built since the 90s in different variants

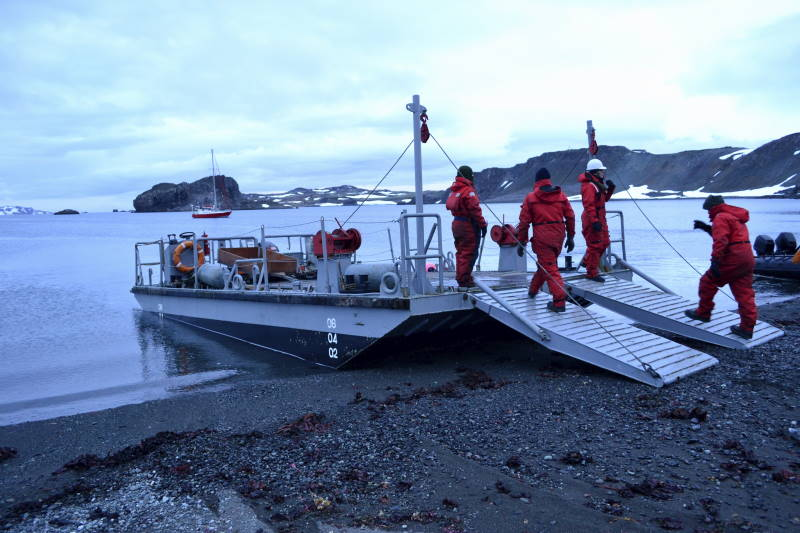
Skua barge, naval artifacts built since the 2000s for cargo transportation

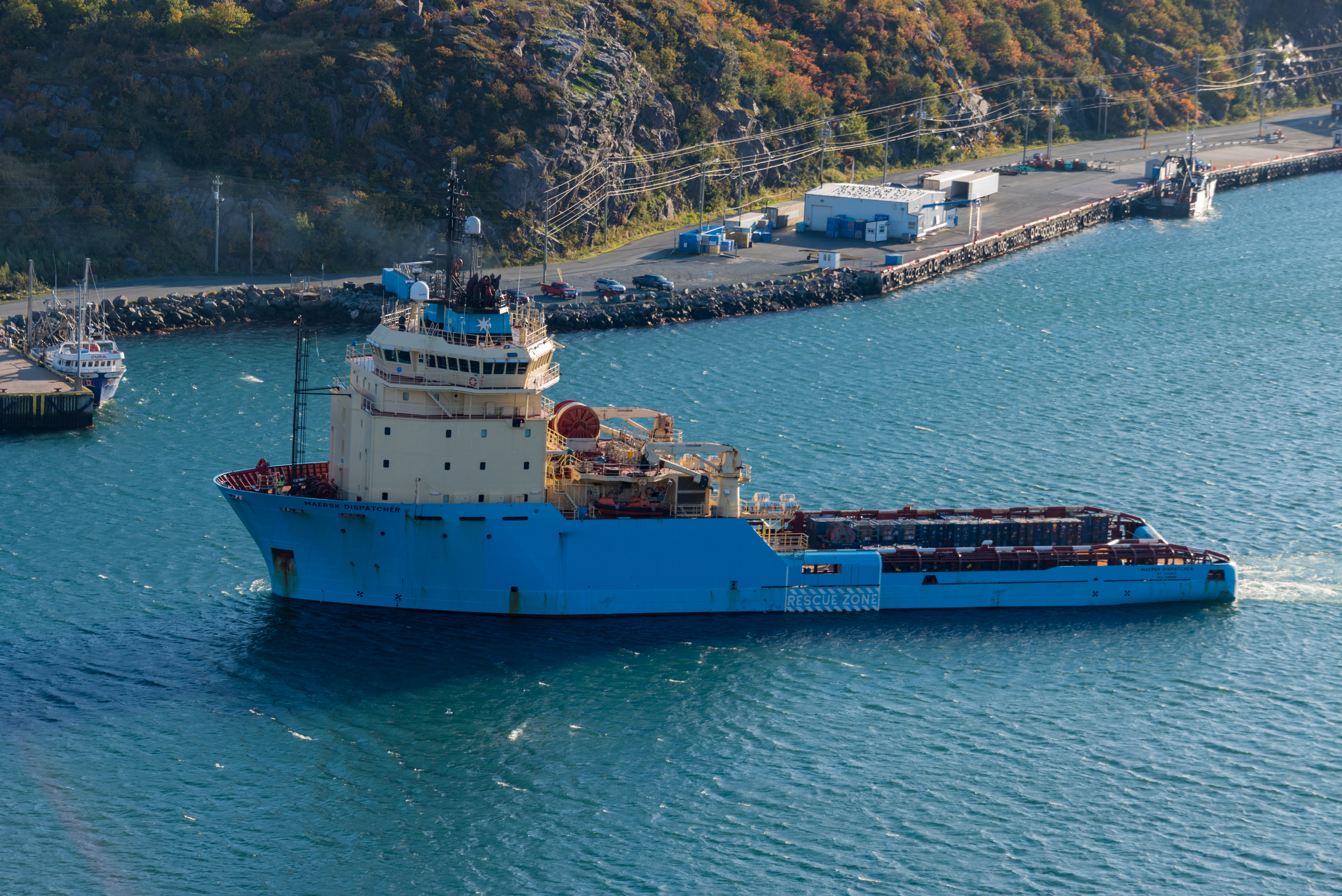
Platform support vessel Maersk Dispatcher, Maersk, 2005 (built in conjunction with the Asenav shipyard)

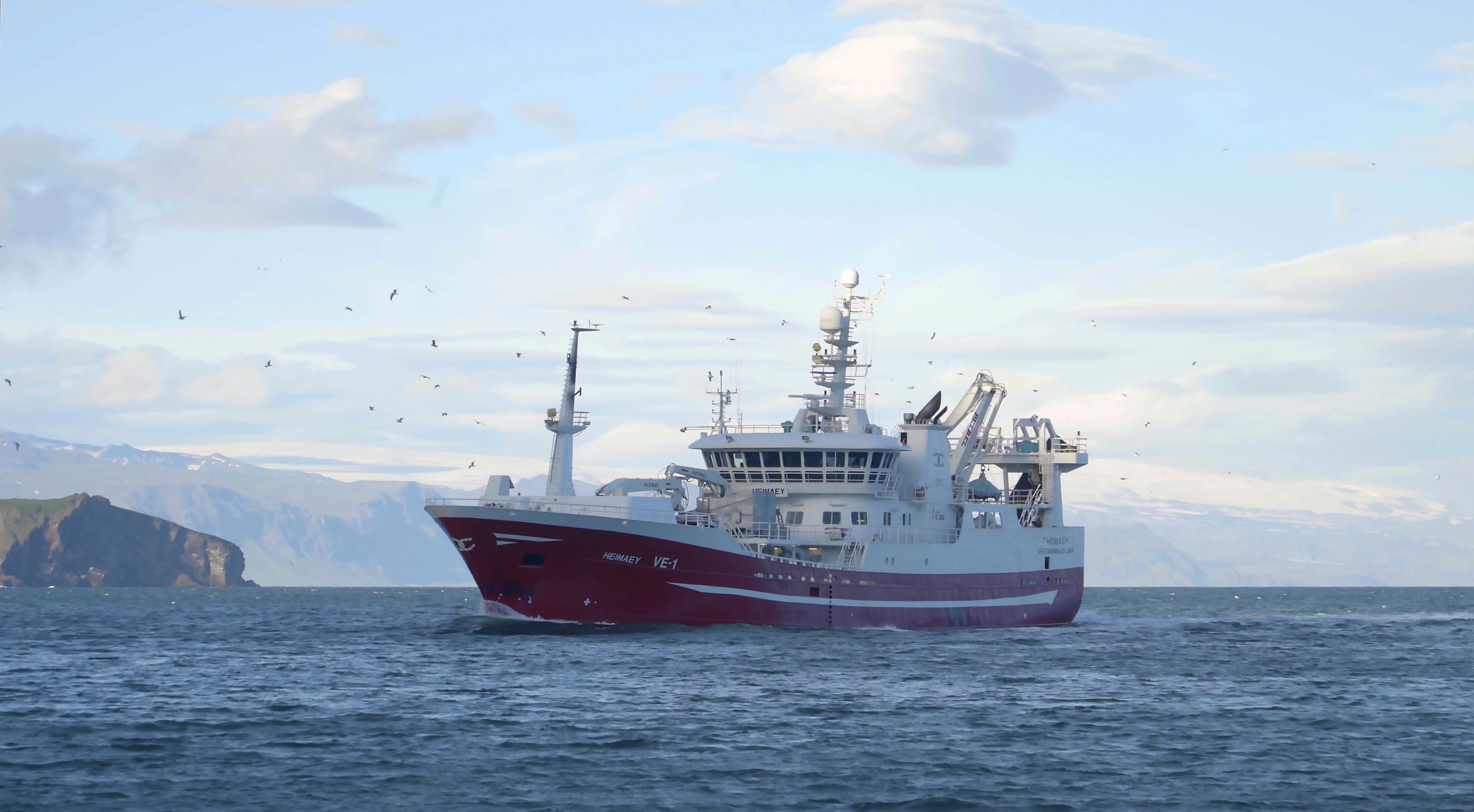
Icelandic fishing vessel Heimaey (VE-1), 2012

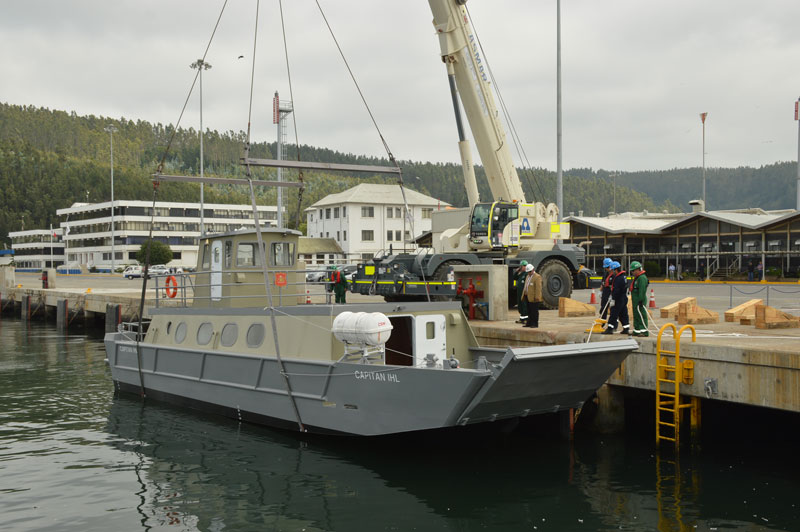
Passenger transport boat Capitán IHL, Chilean Army, 2015

== See also ==
- List of shipyards in Chile
- List of active ships of the Chilean Navy
- List of decommissioned ships of the Chilean Navy
- Plan Nacional Continuo de Construcción Naval

== Sources ==
- Montaño Mardones, Víctor (November–December 1995). "El Apostadero Naval de Talcahuano, los Arsenales de Marina y ASMAR: Historias paralelas" (PDF). Revista de Marina (in Spanish). 112 (829). Viña del Mar, Chile.
- "ASMAR: El apoyo industrial de la flota" (PDF). Revista de Marina (in Spanish). 133 (955). Viña del Mar, Chile. November–December 2016.
- Ostornol Varela, Sergio (July–August 1982). "ASMAR y la industria naval" (PDF). Revista de Marina (in Spanish). 99 (749). Viña del Mar, Chile.
- Volker Charles, John (May–June 1991). "La industria naval" (PDF). Revista de Marina (in Spanish). 108 (802). Viña del Mar, Chile.
- Bravo Valdivieso, Germán (2006). "Buques de la Armada construidos en Chile" (PDF). Academia de Historia Naval y Marítima de Chile (in Spanish). Valparaíso, Chile.
- Gómez Valencia, Luis (January–February 2010). "ASMAR Valparaíso en el siglo XXI" (PDF). Revista de Marina (in Spanish). 127 (914). Viña del Mar, Chile.
- Wood, Gerald L. (January–February 1969). "ASMAR, bases para la formulación de una política de astilleros para Chile" (PDF). Revista de Marina (in Spanish). 86 (668). Viña del Mar, Chile.
