= Ministry of Economy, Development, and Tourism (Chile) =

Government ministry of Chile

The Ministry for the Economy, Development, and Tourism (Spanish: Ministerio de Economía, Fomento y Turismo) is a Chilean state ministry in charge of planning and executing the flow of policies and projects of the Chilean government. The ministry aims to generate feasible and sustainable economic development, with stable progressive equality in the allocation of economic interests. The current Minister of Economy, Development, and Tourism is Daniel Mas.

Since 11 March 2026, the Minister has been Daniel Mas and the Undersecretary of Economy and Small Businesses has been Karlfranz Koehler Duncker.

== History ==
The groundwork for the ministry was established in the 1930s—a period that saw the creation of the Subsecretary of Commerce that was dependent on the Ministry of Foreign Relations of that era. But the actual ministry itself was realized in October 1941 as Ministry of Commerce and Supply, and by 1942 it was ratified as the Ministry of Economy and Commerce. Subsequently, it was renamed to Ministry of Economy (1953–1960), and hitherto the Ministry of Economy, Development, and Reconstruction.

== Structure ==
The Ministry for the Economy, Development, and Reconstruction is divided into three organizations headed by sub-secretaries:

- Economy Under-Secretariat
- Fisheries Under-Secretariat
- Tourism Under-Secretariat

Government organisations related to, dependent, or under supervision of the Ministry of Economy, Development, and Reconstruction include:

- Servicio Nacional de Pesca (SERNAPESCA)
- Servicio Nacional de Turismo (SERNATUR)
- Servicio Nacional del Consumidor (SERNAC)
- Superintendencia de Electricidad y Combustibles (SEC)
- Millennium Science Initiative
- Instituto Nacional de Estadísticas de Chile (INE)
- Fiscalía Nacional Económica (FNE)
- Comité de Inversiones Extranjeras
- Empresa de Abastecimiento de Zonas Aisladas (EMAZA)
- Sistema de Empresas Públicas (SEP)
- Corporación de Fomento de la Producción (CORFO)
- Comité de Inversiones Extranjeras CINVER

== List of Ministers ==
Minister	Start	End	Party	President
Daniel Mas	11 March 2026	Incumbent	Ind.	José Antonio Kast
