= National Fisheries Service =

Chilean government agency

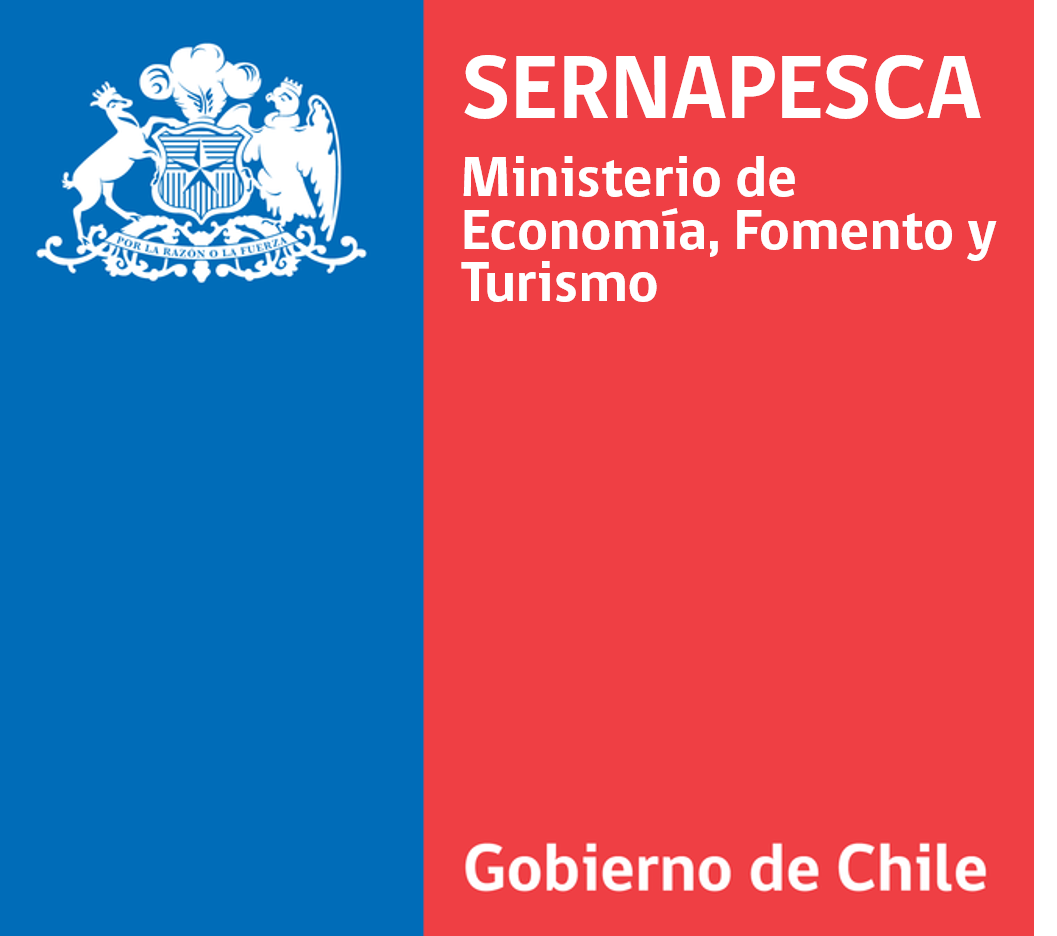
Seal of the National Fisheries Service

National Fisheries Service (Spanish: Servicio Nacional de Pesca y Acuicultura) or SERNAPESCA by its Spanish initials, is a Chilean government agency tasked with protecting hydrobiological resources. SERNAPESCA supervises the use of hydrobiological resources and administers their national sanitary management. It operates under the Ministry of Economy, Development and Tourism.
