= Chilean research ship Cabo de Hornos =

Scientific research ship used by the Chilean Navy

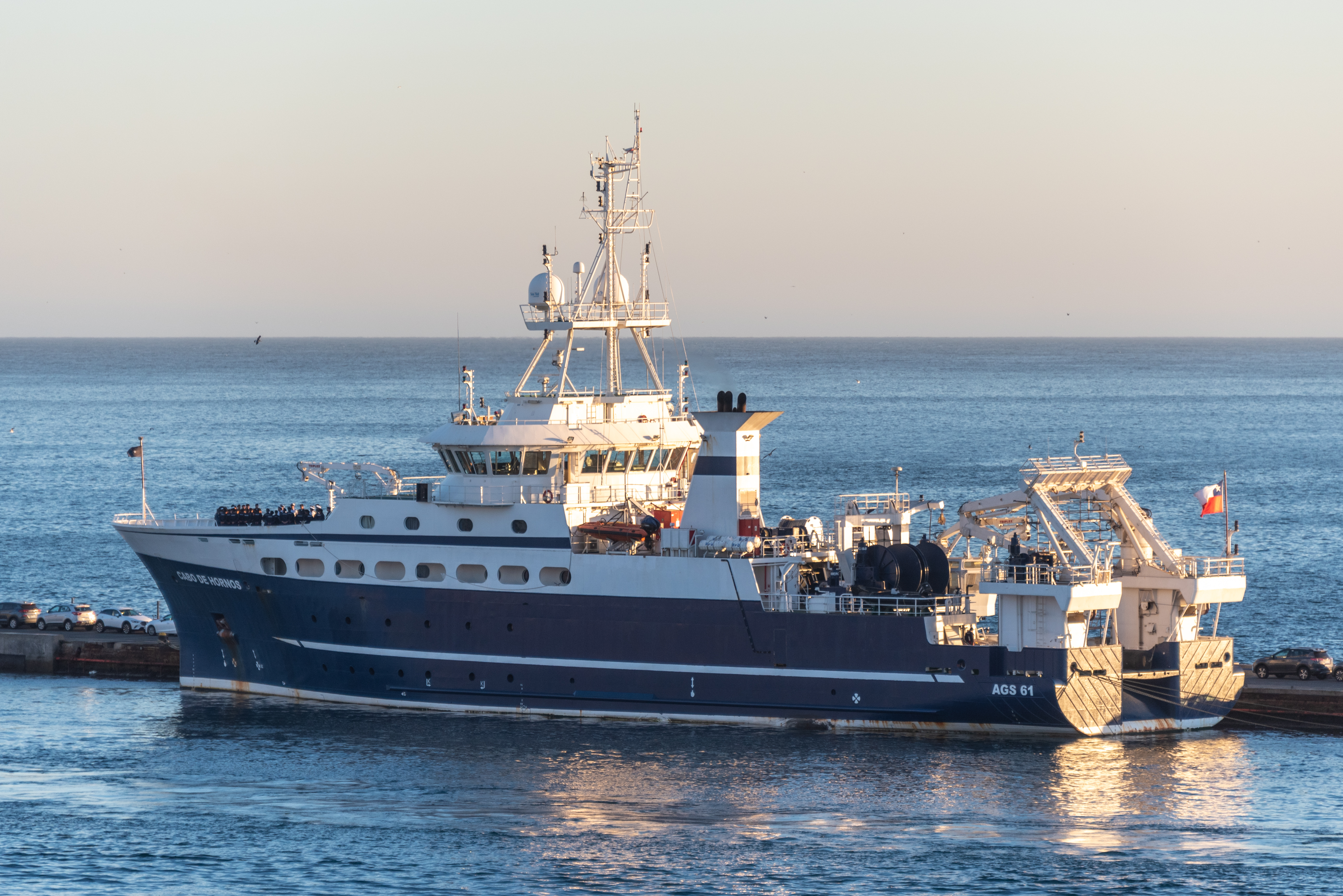
- Chilean Navy research vessel, Cabo de Hornos (AGS-61)

History

Chile
- Name: Cabo de Hornos
- Namesake: Cape Horn
- Owner: Chilean Navy
- Builder: ASMAR, Talcahuano
- Laid down: 2009
- Launched: 28 February 2010
- Identification: Hull number: AGS 61; MMSI number: 725019072; Call sign: CCCH; ICES code: 20HZ
- Status: in active service

General characteristics
- Type: Research vessel
- Tonnage: 3,068 GT
- Length: 74.1 m (243 ft 1 in)
- Beam: 16.6 m (54 ft 6 in)
- Draft: 5.4 m (17 ft 9 in)
- Speed: 15.5 knots (28.7 km/h; 17.8 mph)
- Complement: 68 (43 crew + 25 scientists)

Cabo de Hornos is a scientific research ship used by the Chilean Navy. Built for oceanographic research. The ship is 74.1 metres (243 ft 1 in) long, 19.14 metres (62 ft 10 in) wide, and a gross tonnage of 3,068. The ship can carry a complement of 68 people and cruise at 14.6 knots (27.0 km/h; 16.8 mph).

== History ==
=== Design ===
She was designed by the Norwegian ship designer Skipsteknisk, designated as ST-367.

=== Construction and launch ===
Cabo de Hornos ship began construction in November 2008. The ship was scheduled for launch on 27 February 2010. She was beached by the tsunami which followed the 2010 Chile earthquake early in the morning of the same day, before the launch was scheduled to occur. Following a complicated and involved salvage operation Repairs were made in the shipyard of her construction and the ship was finally delivered to the Navy of Chile in April 2013.
