= Chilean icebreaker Almirante Viel =

Chilean Navy Icebreaker ship

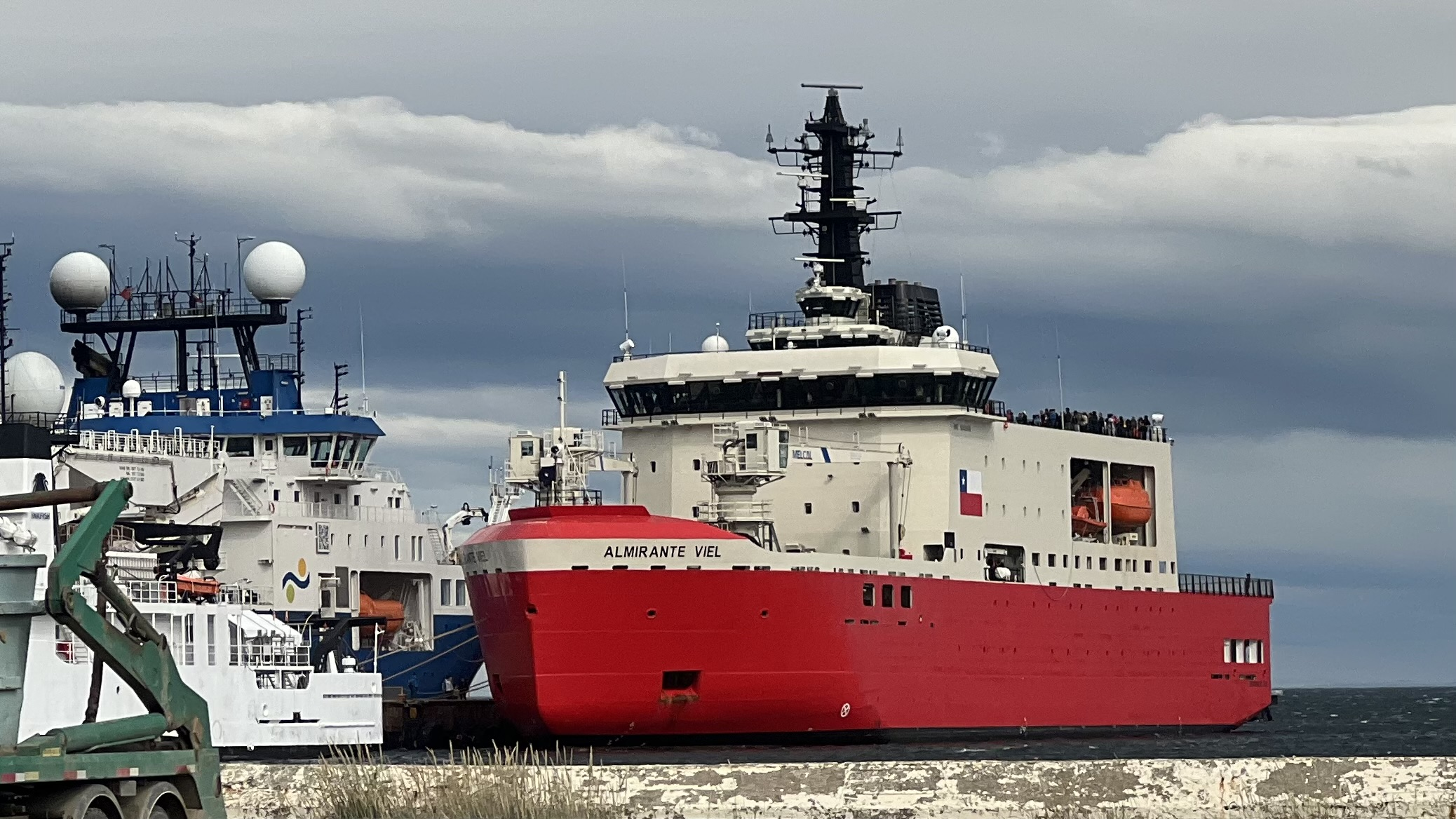
- Icebreaker Almirante Viel at its home port in Punta Arenas

History

Chile
- Name: Almirante Viel
- Namesake: Counter admiral Óscar Viel y Toro
- Operator: Chilean Navy
- Ordered: 1 November 2017
- Builder: ASMAR, Talcahuano
- Cost: US$217 million
- Yard number: 114
- Laid down: 27 August 2019
- Launched: 22 December 2022
- Commissioned: 3 July 2024
- Identification: IMO number: 9843948; MMSI number: 725005198
- Status: In service

General characteristics
- Type: Icebreaker, research vessel
- Tonnage: 10,044 GT; 3,013 NT; 4,088 DWT
- Displacement: 10,400 t (10,200 long tons)
- Length: 111 m (364 ft 2 in)
- Beam: 21 m (68 ft 11 in)
- Draught: 7.2 m (23 ft 7 in)
- Depth: 10.6 m (34 ft 9 in)
- Ice class: Polar Class 5
- Installed power: 2 × Wabtec 16V250MDC; 2 × Wabtec 6L250MDC; 20.7 MW (27,800 hp) (combined)
- Propulsion: Diesel-electric; two shafts (2 × 4.5 MW)
- Speed: 15 knots (28 km/h; 17 mph) in open water; 3 knots (5.6 km/h; 3.5 mph) in 1 m (3.3 ft) ice
- Range: 14,000 nautical miles (26,000 km; 16,000 mi)
- Endurance: 60 days
- Crew: Accommodation for 150
- Aviation facilities: Helipad and hangar for two medium helicopters of the Super Puma or Cougar type

Almirante Viel is a Polar Class 5 icebreaker operated by the Chilean Navy.

== History ==
Previously referred to with the project name Antartica 1, it replaced the 1969-built second-hand vessel Almirante Óscar Viel acquired from Canada in 1994 and decommissioned in 2019. Accounts differ as to when construction of the ship began. It was reported that the first steel was cut by President Bachelet on 9 May 2017, while Jane's Navy International reported construction began in August 2018. The ship was built at the Chilean shipyard ASMAR at Talcahuano. She was classed by Lloyd's Register. Maritime Executive reported in 2016 that she would be comparable to Argentina's ARA Almirante Irízar.

The ship was launched 22 December 2022.

In April 2024, the ship completed its first round of sea trials.

== Design ==
Almirante Viel is 111 metres (364 ft 2 in) long overall and has a beam of 21 metres (68 ft 11 in) and draft of 7.2 metres (23 ft 7 in). She displaces 10,400 tonnes (10,200 long tons). She has accommodation for 150 crew and passengers such as scientists and researchers.

Almirante Viel is strengthened for navigation in ice in accordance with the Unified Requirements for Polar Class Ships developed by the International Association of Classification Societies (IACS). Her ice class, Polar Class 5, is intended for year-round operation in medium first-year ice which may include old ice inclusions.

Almirante Viel has a diesel-electric propulsion system. Her power plant consists of four medium-speed diesel generators: two sixteen-cylinder Wabtec 16V250MDC and two six-cylinder Wabtec 6L250MDC units. The total rating of the power plant is 20.7 megawatts (27,800 hp). The engines meet International Maritime Organization Tier III emission limits for nitrogen oxides without the use of selective catalytic reduction. Her two fixed pitch propellers, each driven by a 4.5-megawatt (6,000 hp) electric propulsion motor, give Almirante Viel speed of 15 knots (28 km/h; 17 mph) and range of 14,000 nautical miles (26,000 km; 16,000 mi) in open water, and ability to break 1-metre (3.3 ft) level ice at a continuous speed of 3 knots (5.6 km/h; 3.5 mph). For maneuvering and dynamic positioning, she has a 2-megawatt (2,700 hp) bow thruster.
