= Asenav =

Chilean ship building company

- Founded: 1974
- Headquarters: Chile, Valdivia
- Key people: Eberhard Kossmann
- Products: shipbuilding
- Website: Asenav.cl

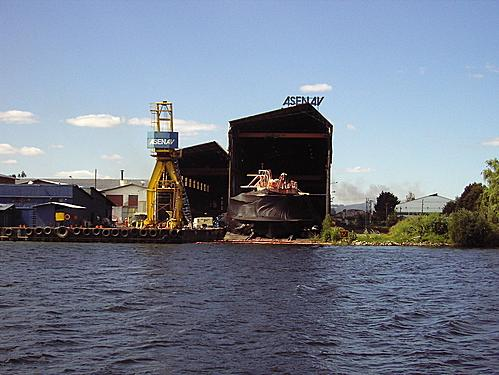
View of the hangars of Asenav in Calle-Calle River

Asenav (Astilleros y Servicios Navales) is a Chilean ship building company, based in Santiago with its main shipyards located in southern Chile in the middle of the city of Valdivia, some 15 km (9.3 mi) from the Bay of Corral at the Pacific coast. The company was established in 1974 by the German immigrant Eberhard Kossmann.

== Ships ==
Ships built by Asenav:

- Ferries
  - Fueguino (1999)
  - Alonso de Ercilla (2001)
  - Patagonia (2006)
  - Cruz del Sur II (2006)
  - Crux Australis (2008)
  - Don Jaime (2012)
  - MV Pelee Islander II
- Tug boats
  - Pulli (1991)
  - Pirehuico (1996)
  - Chan Chan (2000)
  - Riñihue (2002)
  - Svitzer Bedford (2005)
  - Skyring (2007)
  - Loncura (2008)
  - Punta Pereira (2012)
- Tourism ships
  - Patagonia Express (1991)
  - Luciano Beta (1994)
  - Mystique Princess (1996)
  - Mare Australis (2002)
  - Atmosphere (2006)
  - Stella Australis (2010)
  - Ventus Autralis (2017)
  - Magellan Explorer (2019)
- Fishing vessels
  - Tritón (1993)
  - Pehuenco (1994)
  - Corsario I (1997)
  - Christian í Grótinum (1997)
  - El Cazador (1997)
  - Murman II (1998)
- Offshore ships
  - Skandi Stord (1998)
  - Maersk Dispatcher (2005)
  - Maersk Nomad (2009)
  - Maersk Nexus (2010)
- Well boats
  - Don Antonio C (2003)
  - Patagón IV (2003)
  - Patagón V (2004)
  - Patagón VI (2007)
  - Patagón VII (2012)
  - Patagon IX (2020)
