= Chilean submarine O'Higgins =

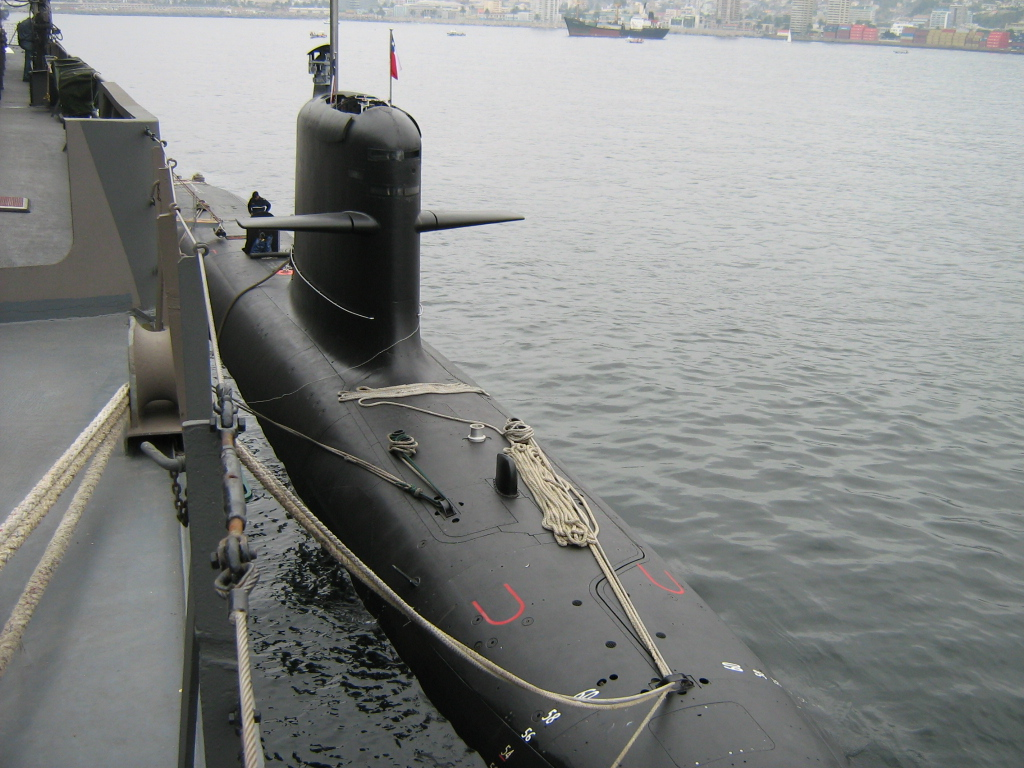
- O'Higgins

History

Chile
- Name: O'Higgins
- Namesake: Bernardo O'Higgins
- Ordered: 1997
- Builder: DCNS Cherbourg & Navantia, Cartagena
- Launched: November 2003
- Commissioned: September 2005
- Home port: Talcahuano
- Status: Active

General characteristics
- Class & type: Scorpène-class submarine
- Displacement: 1,525 long tons (1,549 t) surfaced; 1,668 long tons (1,695 t) submerged
- Length: 66.4 m (217 ft 10 in)
- Beam: 6.2 m (20 ft 4 in)
- Draft: 5.8 m (19 ft 0 in)
- Installed power: Diesel 3,005 kW (4,030 hp) Electric 3,810 kW (5,110 hp)
- Propulsion: Mechanical: 4 diesel engines Electric: 1 main electric motor 1 propeller
- Speed: 12 knots (22 km/h; 14 mph) surfaced; 22 kn (41 km/h; 25 mph) submerged
- Range: 12,000 km (7,500 mi) at 8 kn (15 km/h; 9.2 mph)
- Complement: 31
- Sensors & processing systems: Long-range passive; Intercept; Active sonar
- Armament: 6 × 533 mm (21 in) torpedo tubes for 18 Whitehead Alenia Sistemi Subacquei Black Shark heavyweight torpedoes and 4 SM-39 Exocet anti-ship missiles and 30 mines in place of torpedoes

O'Higgins (SS-23) is a Scorpène-class submarine built for the Chilean Navy by DCNS in Cherbourg, France and Navantia in Cartagena, Spain.

O'Higgins is the first of two units, ahead of Carrera, built to replace the old Oberon-class submarines that served in the Chilean Navy for 30 years. It is currently serving in the Submarine Force with a base port in Talcahuano.
