= KD Tun Abdul Razak =

Scorpène-class submarine

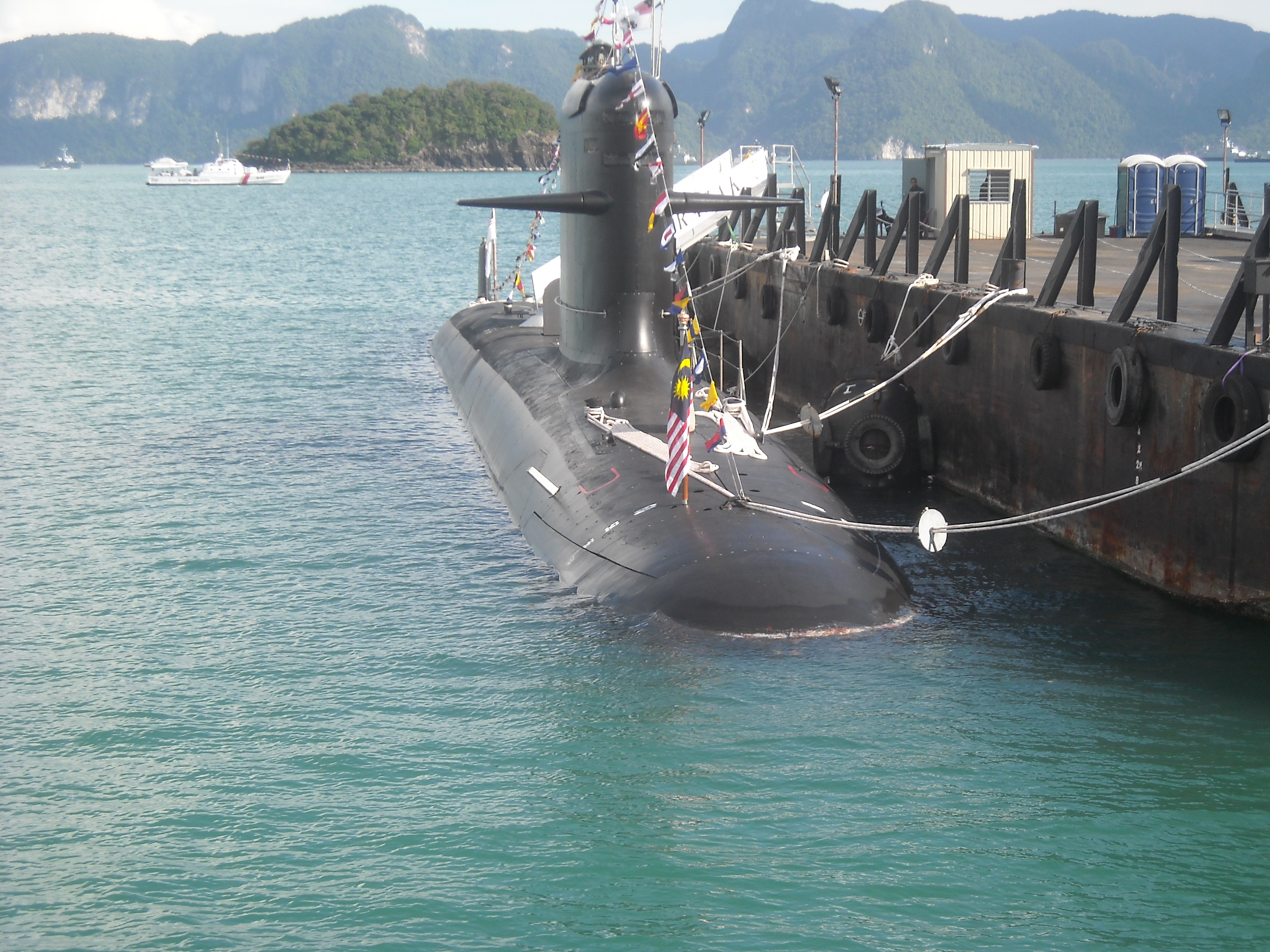
- KD Tun Abdul Razak docked at jetty in Awana Porto Malai in Langkawi during the LIMA 2011

History

Malaysia
- Name: KD Tun Abdul Razak
- Namesake: Tun Abdul Razak
- Ordered: June 2002
- Builder: Navantia, Cartagena
- Laid down: 25 April 2005
- Launched: October 2008
- Acquired: 2 July 2010
- Commissioned: 25 January 2010
- Home port: Sepanggar
- Status: Active
- Badge

General characteristics
- Class & type: Scorpène-class submarine
- Displacement: 1,577 long tons (1,602 t) surfaced; 1,711 long tons (1,738 t) submerged
- Length: 67.4 m (221 ft 2 in)
- Beam: 6.2 m (20 ft 4 in)
- Draft: 5.4 m (17 ft 9 in)
- Propulsion: 2 × SEMT-Pielstick 12 PA4 200SM DS diesels; 1 × Jeumont Industrie motor; 4,700 hp (3,505 kW); 1 shaft
- Speed: 12 knots (22 km/h; 14 mph) surfaced; 20.5 kn (38.0 km/h; 23.6 mph) submerged
- Range: 6,000 nmi (11,000 km; 6,900 mi) at 8 kn (15 km/h; 9.2 mph) surfaced; 360 nmi (670 km; 410 mi) at 4 kn (7.4 km/h; 4.6 mph) submerged
- Test depth: More than 300 m (980 ft)
- Complement: 32
- Sensors & processing systems: I-band navigation radar; Hull mounted, active/passive search and attack, medium frequency sonars
- Electronic warfare & decoys: Thales DR 3000 tactical ESM receiver
- Armament: 6 × 533 mm (21 in) torpedo tubes for 18 Whitehead Alenia Sistemi Subacquei Black Shark heavyweight torpedoes and SM-39 Exocet anti-ship missiles and 30 mines in place of torpedoes

KD Tun Abdul Razak is a Scorpène-class submarine of Royal Malaysian Navy.

== Development and design ==
In 2002, Malaysia ordered two Scorpène-class boats worth €1.04 billion (about RM4.78 billion). Both boats Tunku Abdul Rahman and Tun Abdul Razak commissioned by Royal Malaysian Navy in 2009.

The Scorpène class of submarines has four subtypes: the CM-2000 conventional diesel-electric version, the AM-2000 air-independent propulsion (AIP) derivative, the downsized CA-2000 coastal submarine, and the enlarged S-BR for the Brazilian Navy, without AIP.

== Construction and career ==
She was laid down on 25 April 2005 and launched in October 2008. She was commissioned in December 2009 and assigned to Sepanggar Naval Base, Sabah.

== Gallery ==
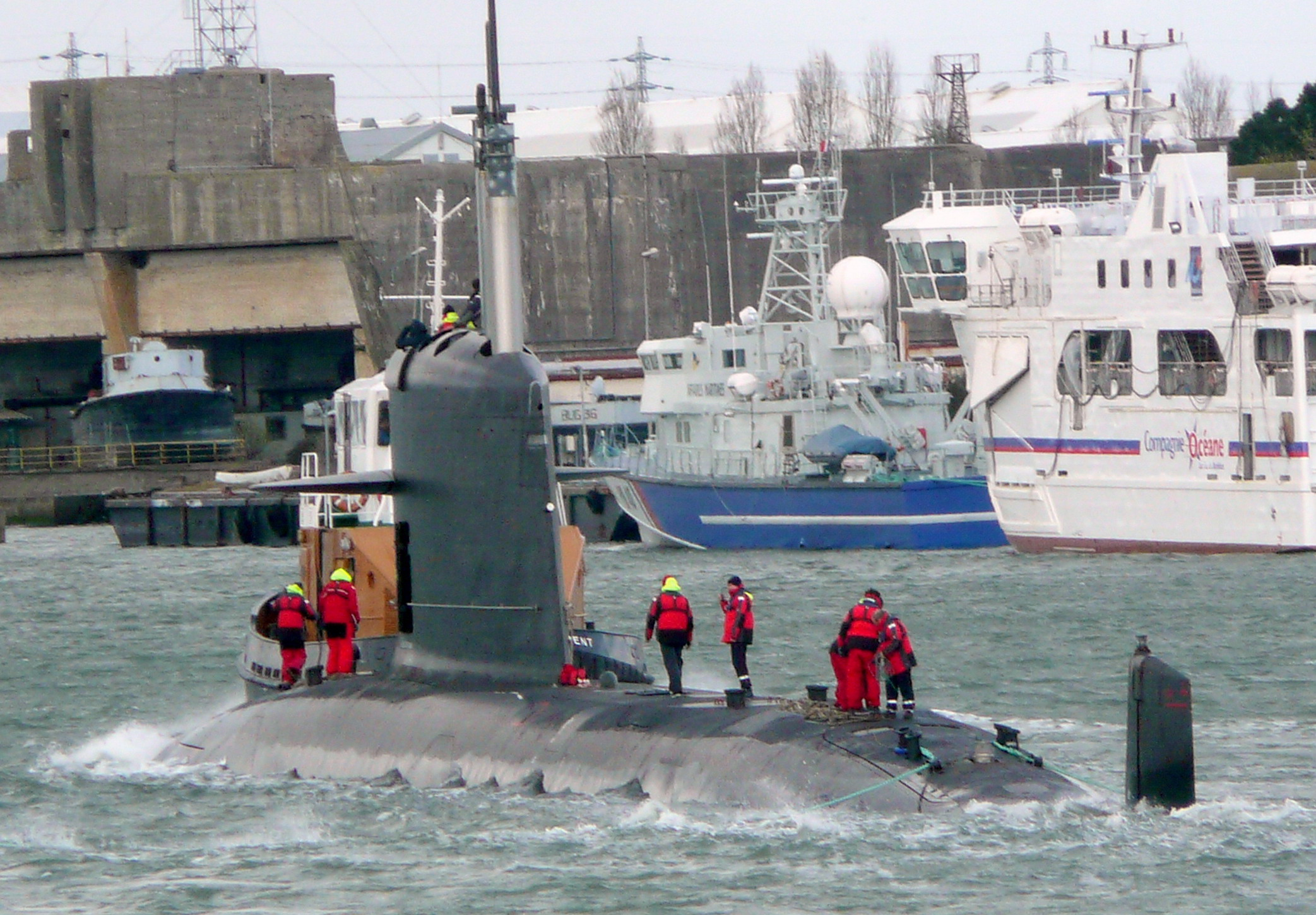
KD Tun Abdul Razak at Lorient in March 2008.

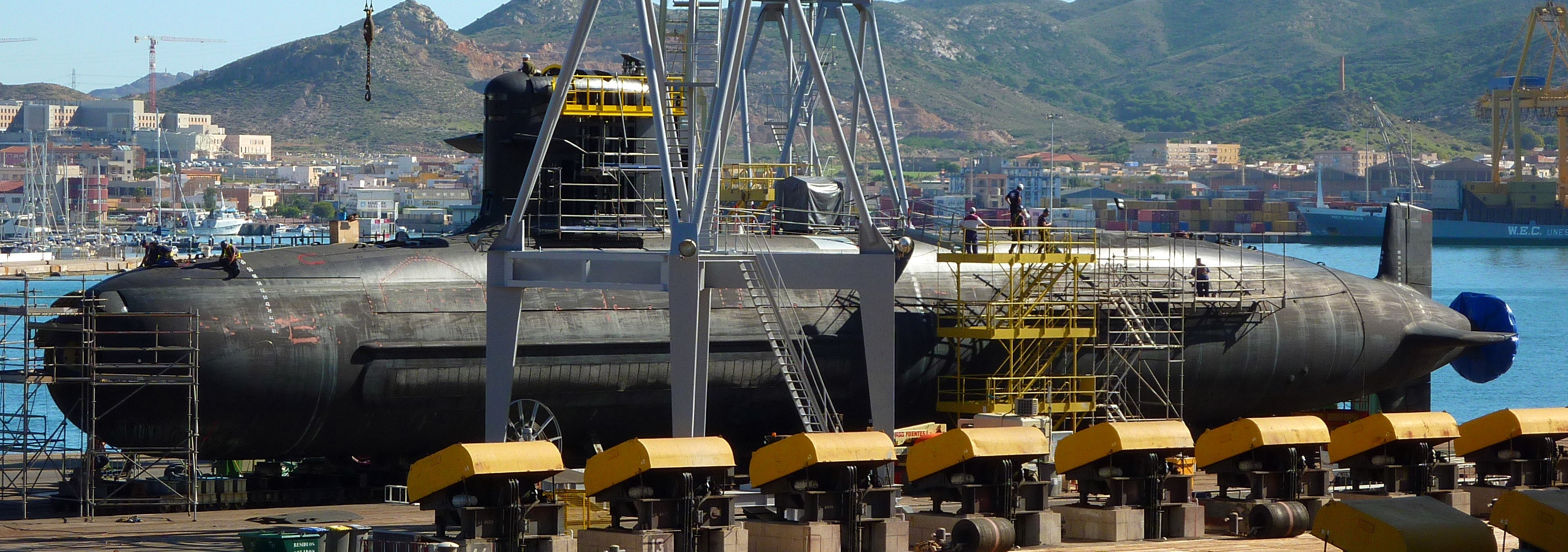
KD Tun Abdul Razak at Navantia on 23 October 2009.
