= Andrasta =

The name Andrasta can signify:

- Andrasta (goddess), in Celtic mythology
- Andrasta class submarine, a French submarine design
- Andrasta (yacht), the prototype Iceni 39 offshore racing yacht
