= Chilean submarine Carrera =

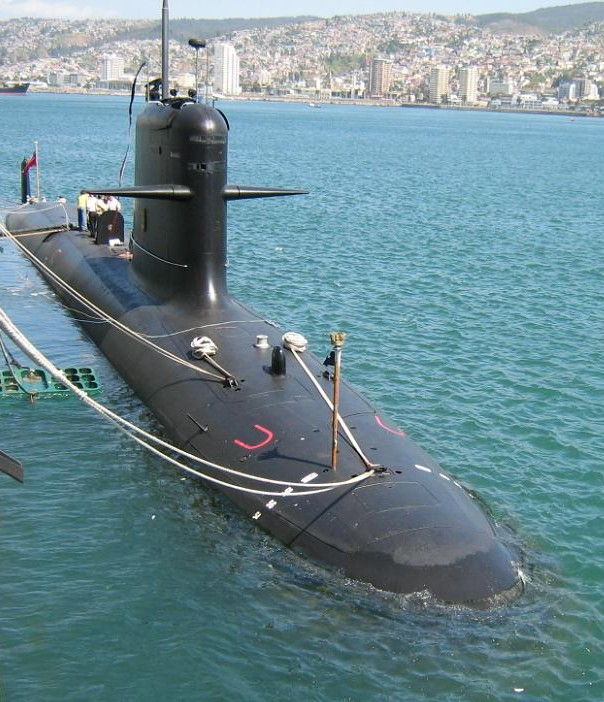
- Carrera

History

Chile
- Name: Carrera
- Namesake: José Miguel Carrera
- Ordered: 1997
- Builder: DCNS Cherbourg & Navantia, Cartagena
- Launched: November 2004
- Commissioned: July 2006
- Home port: Talcahuano
- Status: Active

General characteristics
- Class & type: Scorpène-class submarine
- Displacement: 1,525 long tons (1,549 t) surfaced; 1,668 long tons (1,695 t) submerged
- Length: 66.4 m (217 ft 10 in)
- Beam: 6.2 m (20 ft 4 in)
- Draft: 5.8 m (19 ft 0 in)
- Installed power: Diesel 3005 kW Electric 3810 kW
- Propulsion: Mechanical: 4 diesel engines Electric: 1 main electric motor 1 propeller
- Speed: 12 knots (22 km/h; 14 mph) surfaced; 22 kn (41 km/h; 25 mph) submerged
- Range: 12,000 km (7,500 mi) at 8 kn (15 km/h; 9.2 mph)
- Complement: 31
- Sensors & processing systems: Long-range passive; Intercept; Active sonar
- Armament: 6 × 533 mm (21 in) torpedo tubes for 18 Whitehead Alenia Sistemi Subacquei Black Shark heavyweight torpedoes and 4 SM-39 Exocet anti-ship missiles and 30 mines in place of torpedoes

Carrera (SS-22) is a Scorpène-class submarine built for the Chilean Navy by DCNS in Cherbourg and Navantia in Cartagena, Spain.

Carrera is the second of two units, behind O'Higgins (SS-23) built to replace the old Oberon-class submarines that served in the Chilean Navy for 30 years. It is currently serving in the Submarine Force with a base port in Talcahuano.
