= Scorpène-class submarine =

Class of submarine

- Scorpène class profile

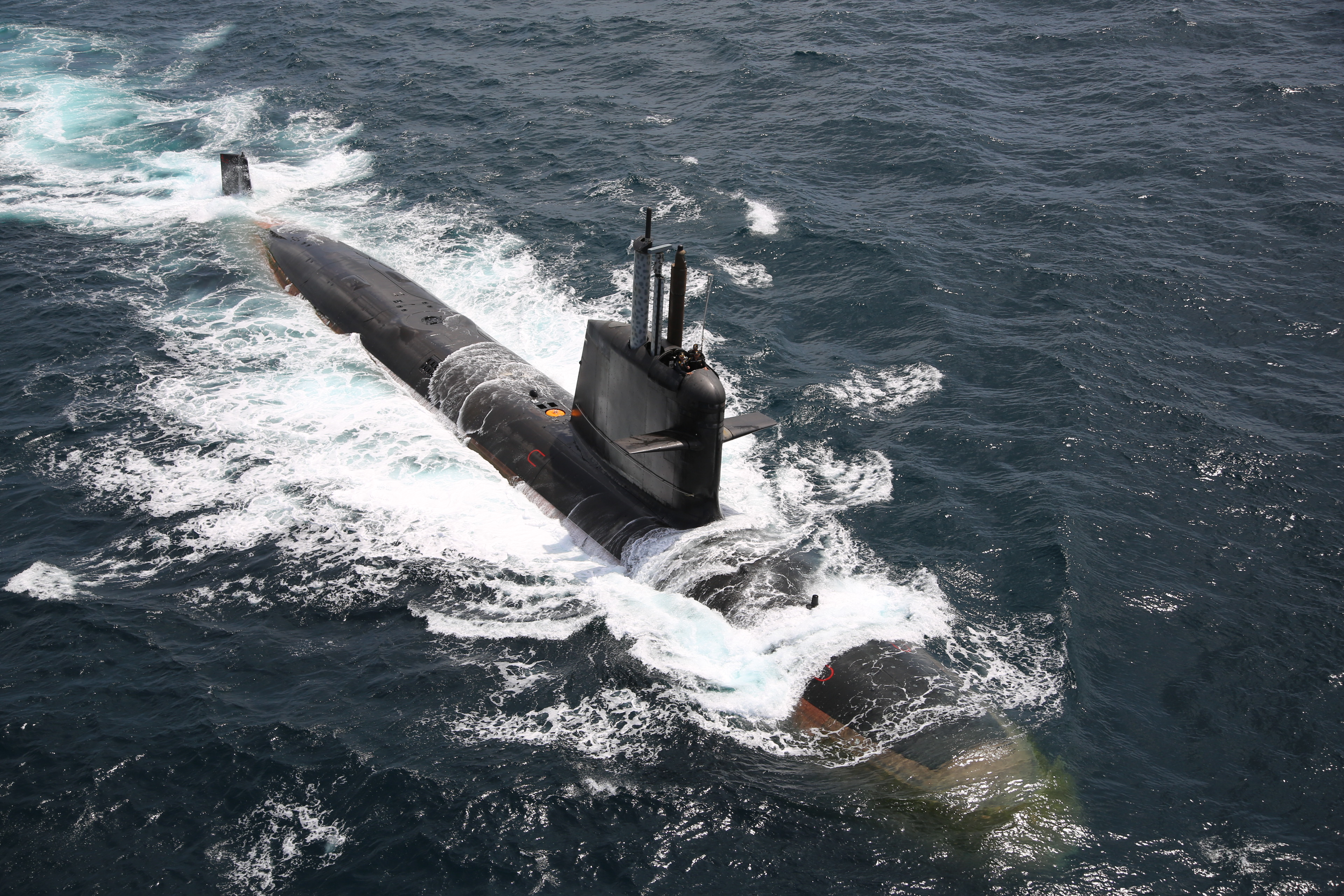
- Indian Navy's INS Kalvari at sea

Class overview
- Name: Scorpène class
- Builders: Naval Group; Navantia; Mazagon Dock Limited; Itaguaí Construções Navais; PAL Indonesia
- Operators: Chilean Navy; Royal Malaysian Navy; Indian Navy; Brazilian Navy
- Succeeded by: S-80 Plus class; Marlin class; Project 75I class (India)
- Subclasses: Kalvari class; Riachuelo class; CA-2000; CM-2000; AM-2000
- Cost: US$450 million
- Built: 1999–present
- In commission: 2005–present
- Planned: 20
- Building: 2
- Completed: 14
- Canceled: 4
- Active: 13

General characteristics
- Type: Submarine
- Displacement: 1,565 t (1,540 long tons) (CM-2000); 1,870 t (1,840 long tons) (AM-2000); 1,900 t (1,900 long tons) (S-BR)
- Length: 61.7 m (202 ft 5 in) (CM-2000); 70 m (229 ft 8 in) (AM-2000); 70.62 m (231 ft 8 in) (S-BR)
- Beam: 6.2 m (20 ft 4 in)
- Draft: 5.8 m (19 ft 0 in)
- Propulsion: Diesel-electric; Batteries; Air-independent propulsion (AIP); MESMA AIP (Naval Group models); DRDO PAFC Fuel Cell AIP (Kalvari class)
- Speed: 20 knots (37 km/h; 23 mph) (submerged); 12 kn (22 km/h; 14 mph) (surfaced)
- Range: 6,500 nmi (12,000 km) at 8 kn (15 km/h; 9.2 mph) (surfaced); 550 nmi (1,020 km; 630 mi) at 5 kn (9.3 km/h; 5.8 mph) (submerged)
- Endurance: 40 days (compact); 50 days (normal); 50 + 21 days (AIP)
- Test depth: >350 m (1,150 ft)
- Complement: 31
- Armament: 6 × 533 mm (21 in) torpedo tubes for 18 Whitehead Alenia Sistemi Subacquei Black Shark heavyweight torpedoes, SM-39 Exocet anti-ship missiles, and A3SM (MICA) anti-air missiles and 30 mines in place of torpedoes

The Scorpène-class submarines are a class of diesel-electric attack submarines jointly developed by the French Naval Group (formerly DCNS) and the Spanish company Navantia. It features diesel propulsion and an additional air-independent propulsion (AIP). It is now marketed as the Scorpène 2000.

== Scorpène characteristics ==
The Scorpène class of submarines has three subtypes:

- CM-2000 - conventional diesel-electric version 61.7 meters long.
- AM-2000 - air-independent propulsion (AIP) derivative.
  - MESMA AIP, length stretched to 70 meters.
- CA-2000 - downsized version for coastal missions.
- S-BR - Brazilian Navy variant, a CM-2000 stretched to 70.62 meters to accommodate more batteries.

The Chilean and Malaysian boats are fitted with the TSM 2233 Mk 2 sonar. The class can also be fitted with a 'S-Cube' sonar suite from Thales.

=== Air-independent propulsion ===
The French Module d'Energie Sous-Marine Autonome (MESMA) system is being offered by the French shipyard Naval Group for the Scorpène-class submarines. It is essentially a modified version of their nuclear propulsion system with heat being generated by ethanol and oxygen. The combustion of the ethanol and stored oxygen, at a pressure of 60 atm (6.1 MPa), generates steam which powers a conventional turbine power plant. This pressure-firing allows exhaust carbon dioxide to be expelled overboard at any depth without an exhaust compressor.

Each MESMA system costs around US$50–60 million. As installed on the Scorpènes, it requires adding a new 8.3-metre (27 ft), 305-tonne hull section to the submarines, and enables a submarine to operate for more than 21 days under water depending on speed.

Naval Group is also developing second-generation hydrogen fuel cell AIP modules for future Scorpène models.

== Scorpène information leak ==
In mid-August 2016, The Australian newspaper published documents containing old technical information about the Scorpène submarines and reported that design details of the Scorpène-class submarine and other ships had been leaked. The leaked information spreads over 22,400 pages and includes detailed information about the submarine's combat and stealth capabilities. The leak also included information about noise levels, submarine frequencies and more. Despite all the information leaks, Indian Navy Chief, Admiral Sunil Lanba, was quoted as saying that the leaks were being viewed "very seriously", but were "not a matter of much worry". The report also suggested that an ex-French Navy officer working as a sub-contractor for Naval Group may have been the source of the leak, and that the leaked data may have been written in France in 2011. However, on 30 August 2016, a court in New South Wales temporarily banned The Australian from releasing any more confidential data on the Indian Scorpène-class submarines.

Naval Group filed a complaint against the newspaper with the Supreme Court of the State of New South Wales in Australia. The Australian court ruled in favour of Naval Group on 29 August and confirmed its decision on 1 September.

== Operators ==
=== Current operators ===
==== Chile ====
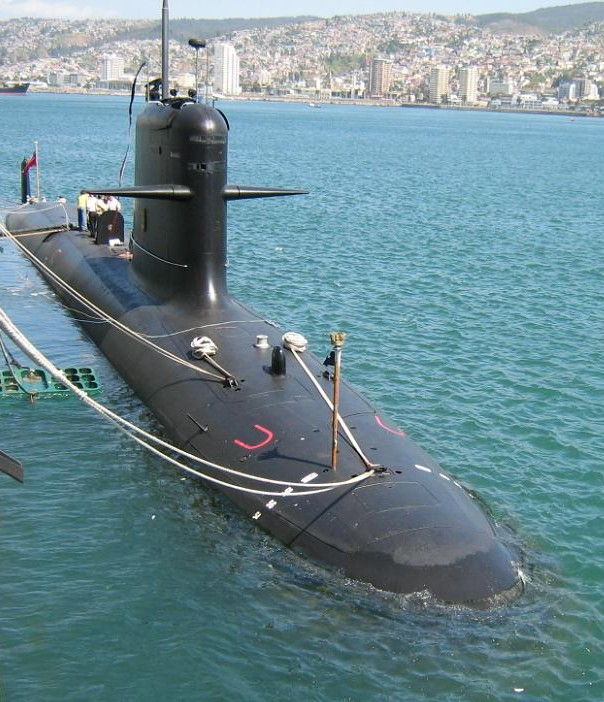
Carrera of the Chilean Navy

The Chilean Navy ordered two Scorpène-class boats, which replaced two Oberon-class submarines retired by the Chilean Navy. The Chilean Scorpène-class O'Higgins and Carrera were completed in 2005 and 2006, respectively.

==== Malaysia ====
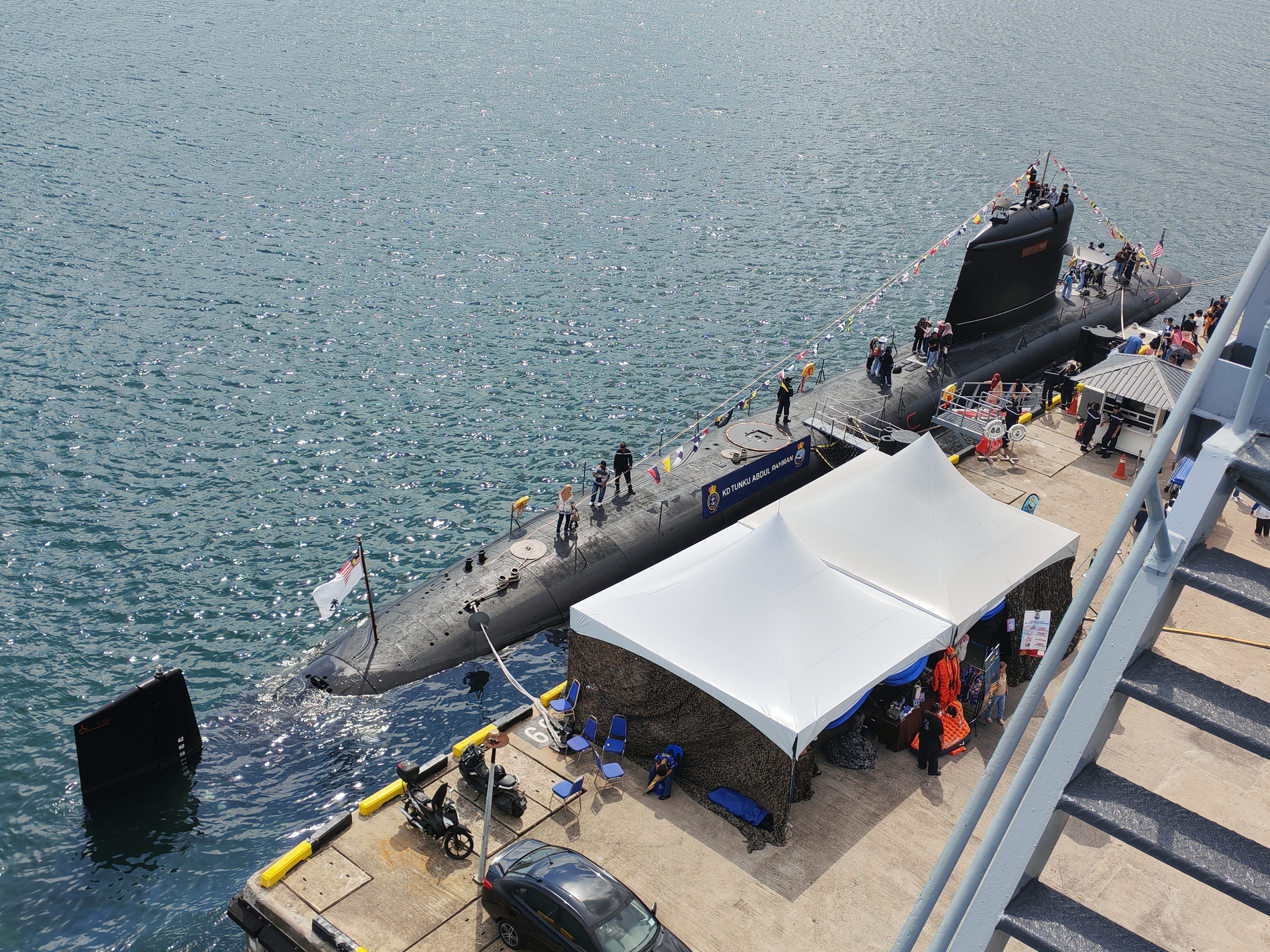
KD Tunku Abdul Rahman of the Royal Malaysian Navy

In 2002, Malaysia ordered two Scorpène-class boats worth €1.04 billion (about RM4.78 billion). Both boats Tunku Abdul Rahman and Tun Abdul Razak commissioned by Royal Malaysian Navy in 2009.

==== India ====
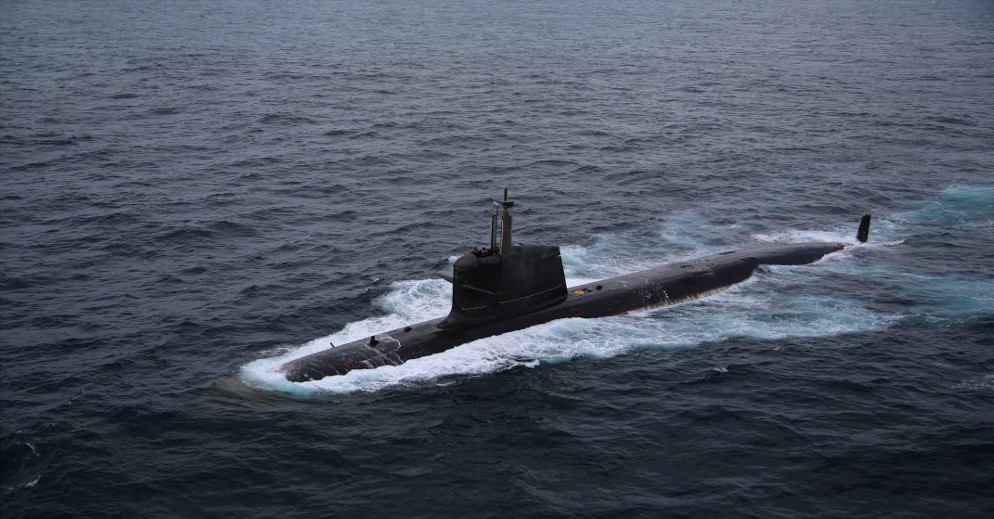
INS Kalvari of the Indian Navy

In 2005, India chose the Scorpène design; purchasing six submarines for US$3 billion (US$500 million per boat). Under a technology transfer agreement, the state-owned Mazagon Docks in Mumbai was to manufacture the submarines, and deliver them between 2012 and 2016, however the project is running six years behind schedule. Construction started on 23 May 2009. In August 2016, over 20,000 confidential pages of the submarine's manual were leaked by Australian media, stirring up a controversy about the impact to India's ambitions of fielding a blue-water navy.

Naval Group answered that those documents were not crucial. After extensive sea trials, Kalvari was commissioned into the Indian Navy on 14 December 2017.

India's Defence Procurement Board (DPB) (a part of the Ministry of Defence) green lit the acquisition of 3 additional boats on 10 July 2023. Following this, the Defence Acquisition Council (DAC) cleared the proposal on 13 July 2023. The deal was expected to be signed during Prime Minister Narendra Modi's visit to France on Bastille Day, 14 July 2023. However, no such deal was signed and the deal is now expected to be signed by end of 2024 with the deliveries beginning by 2031.

On 16 October 2025, Naval Group and Mazagon Dock Shipbuilders signed a Memorandum of Understanding (MoU) to jointly offer evolved Scorpéne submarine to friendly foreign countries.

==== Brazil ====
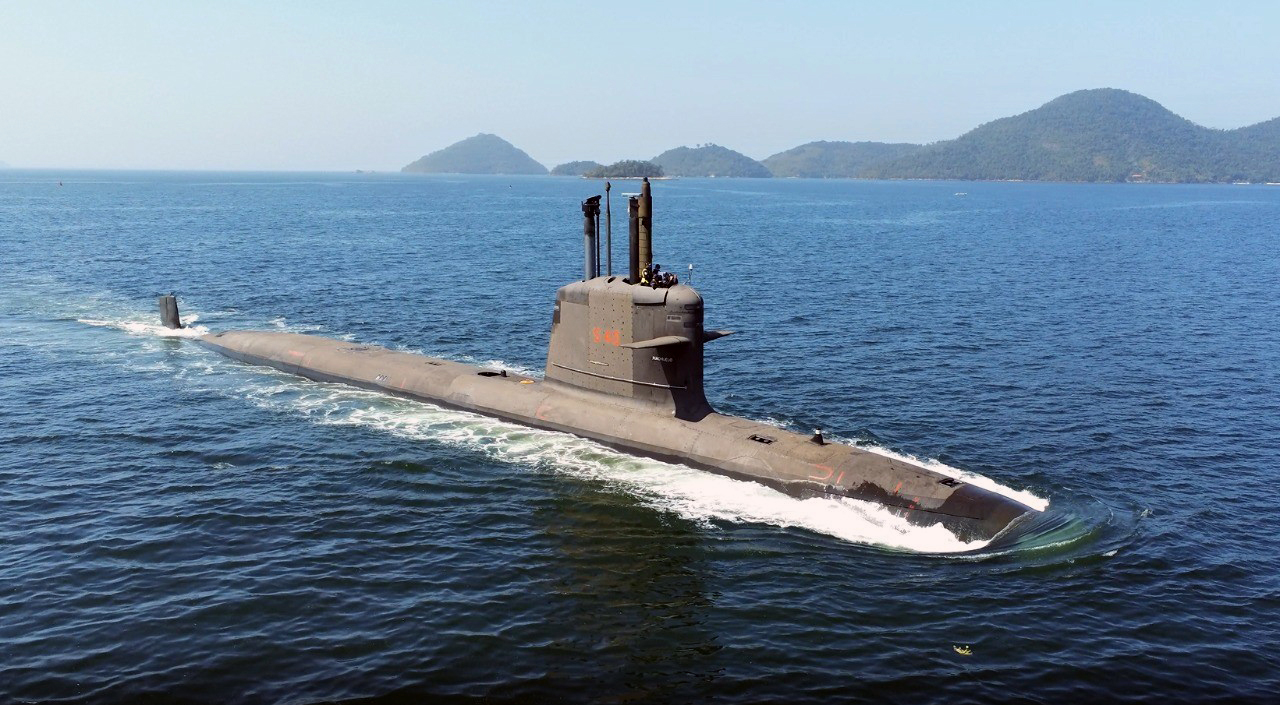
Riachuelo of the Brazilian Navy

In 2009, Brazil purchased four enlarged Scorpènes for US$10 billion with a technology transfer agreement and a second agreement to develop a French/Brazilian nuclear-powered submarine. The Brazilian submarine class was given the designation Riachuelo class. The hull of the first S-BR (S40) was laid down at Cherbourg on 27 May 2010 and is to be jumboized at the Brazilian Navy Shipyard in Sepetiba in late 2012. The latter three submarines will be built there entirely, and are planned to be commissioned in 2020, 2021, and 2022. The nuclear-powered submarine Álvaro Alberto is under construction since 2018, with scheduled launch for 2027.

The first submarine Riachuelo was launched on 14 December 2018, and began sea trials in September 2019. All the submarines are built by the Brazilian defence company Itaguaí Construções Navais.

=== Future operators ===
==== Indonesia ====
As of 2021, Indonesia was considering purchasing a Riachuelo-class submarine, the Scorpène variant constructed for Brazil. Talks for such a purchase started as early as 2016.

On 7 June 2021, Indonesia signed a letter of intent to buy six Scorpène-class submarines and weapons packages from France. On 10 February 2022, the Indonesian Minister of Defence Prabowo Subianto and his French counterpart Florence Parly witness the signing of Memorandum of Understanding (MoU) between Kaharuddin Djenod, CEO of PAL Indonesia and Pierre Eric Pommellet, CEO of Naval Group on cooperation in research and development between PAL Indonesia and Naval Group regarding the plan to purchase Six Scorpène submarines with AIP (Air-independent Propulsion) along with weapons and spare parts as well as training.

In October 2023, Naval Group renewed its proposal by offering the latest variant called Scorpene Evolved equipped with a complete lithium-ion battery (LIB) setup, enabling it to operate for a total of 80 days and travel over 8,000 nautical miles. Scorpene Evolved boasts a reduced acoustic signature and can sustain its maximum speed for extended periods, distinguishing it from the previous variants. Approximately one-third of the total contract value, estimated at about $2.1 billion, will return to Indonesia through offsets and other collaboration initiatives. The offer scheme includes a whole local production.

In April 2024, Naval Group confirmed that Indonesia signed a contract order for two Scorpene Evolved submarines, which will be built in Indonesia. The contract for two submarines has entered into force on 23 July 2025. Construction of the two boats at PAL Indonesia shipyard was started in late July 2025. The first steel cutting ceremony was held on 7 August 2026. Indonesian Navy official stated during the ceremony that the construction progress for the vessel has reached approximately 20.5%. The submarine construction is planned to take 96 months or around 8 years.

=== Potential operators ===
==== Argentina ====
In October 2024 Argentine Minister of Defense, Luis Petri, signed a letter of agreement with French President Emmanuel Macron starting negotiations for the purchase by part of Argentina of three Scorpène submarines that would potentially equip the Argentine Navy. The agreement would involve an estimated investment of $2 billion US by Argentina.

==== Egypt ====
Talks are still ongoing between Egypt and Naval Group regarding the procurement of the Scorpène 2000-class submarine along with a transfer of technology (TOT) agreement. The report also states that the deal may include four submarines, with an option for two more.

==== Philippines ====
In December 2019, Secretary of National Defense of Philippines Delfin Lorenzana announced that the Scorpène-class submarine of France fits the requirements of the Philippine Navy. Lorenzana visited a Scorpène-class submarine when he visited France. On 18 December 2019, Lorenzana said that the Philippines is one step closer to acquiring the French submarine after signing an agreement with France sought to enhance both country's maritime defense. In January 2020, Philippine and French Navy conducted an expert exchange on a submarine to enhance members in the submarine's information about the submarine proper. In July 2023, Naval Group presented its submarine package that includes a submarine base in Subic's Agila Shipyard and training of personnel, aside from getting the project funded by a long term loan arrangement. The submarines are likely patterned from Brazil's Riachuelo-class variant.

==== Romania ====
As of 2022, Romania is considering purchasing two Scorpène-class submarines from the French.

==== Greece ====
In July 2025, a formal process to acquire additional four submarines was started as part of a 20 year modernization plan estimated to cost $25 billion. Type 218, Type 209NG, Scorpène-class, conventional Barracuda-class submarine (France), and Blekinge-class submarine are being considered.

=== Failed bids ===
==== Spain ====
In 2003, the Spanish government ordered four Scorpène AIP submarines worth €1,756 million. However, the Spanish Navy cancelled the order, and ordered four S-80-class submarines, instead. This has caused conflicts and controversies between Naval Group and Navantia, as the latter is still involved in the construction of the submarines sold to India, Malaysia, and Chile, while the S-80 is offered on the export market. As an answer to the competition from the S-80, Naval Group designed its own enhanced version of the Scorpène called the Marlin class, but little is known about this design and the Scorpène is still offered by France on the export market. The dispute was settled when Navantia gave up export rights on the Scorpène class, leaving Naval Group with sole responsibility for the project.

==== Poland ====
On 1 March 2011, the Naval Shipyard Gdynia of Poland and Naval Group offered a license to build a yet undisclosed number of modified Scorpène-class boats. The Scorpène design is competing with that of the German Type 214 submarine. Naval Group participate in the “Orka” submarine procurement programme pursued by the Polish Navy. Ultimately, Poland selected the Blekinge-class submarine.

==== Norway ====
In December 2016, the Norwegian Ministry of Defence announced that Norway would sign a contract for four new submarines before the end of 2019. These would either be Scorpène vessels from Naval Group or German U-boats from ThyssenKrupp. Norway would also be looking into possible cooperation on maintenance and construction with other potential buyers of the same submarines, such as Poland or the Netherlands. In February 2017, the Norwegian Government announced that it intended to procure its new submarines from the German manufacturer, ThyssenKrupp. Norway and Germany will buy submarines together to mutualize expenses. In practice the tender was cancelled and exclusive government to government negotiations were initiated.

== Units ==
| Name | Pennant no. | Laid down | Launched | Commissioned | Homeport |
Chile
| O'Higgins | SS-23 | 18 November 1999 | 1 November 2003 | 8 September 2005 | Talcahuano |
| Carrera | SS-22 | November 2000 | 24 November 2004 | 20 July 2006 | Talcahuano |
Malaysia
| KD Tunku Abdul Rahman | - | 25 April 2004 | 23 October 2007 | January 2009 | Sepanggar |
| KD Tun Abdul Razak | - | 25 April 2005 | October 2008 | December 2009 | Sepanggar |
India
| Kalvari | S-21 | 1 April 2009 | 6 April 2015 | 14 December 2017 | Visakhapatnam / Mumbai |
| Khanderi | S-22 | October 2011 | 12 January 2017 | 28 September 2019 | Visakhapatnam / Mumbai |
| Karanj | S-23 | December 2012 | 31 January 2018 | 10 March 2021 | Visakhapatnam / Mumbai |
| Vela | S-24 | —N/a | 6 May 2019 | 25 November 2021 | Visakhapatnam / Mumbai |
| Vagir | S-25 | —N/a | 12 November 2020 | 23 January 2023 | Visakhapatnam / Mumbai |
| Vagsheer | S-26 | —N/a | 20 April 2022 | 15 January 2025 | Visakhapatnam / Mumbai |
Brazil
| Riachuelo | S40 | 27 May 2010 | 14 December 2018 | 1 September 2022 | Madeira Island, Itaguaí |
| Humaitá | S41 | 9 September 2013 | 11 December 2020 | 12 January 2024 | Madeira Island, Itaguaí |
| Tonelero | S42 | 13 January 2015 | 27 March 2024 | 26 November 2025 | Madeira Island, Itaguaí |
| Almirante Karam | S43 | —N/a | 26 November 2025 | 2026 (expected) | Madeira Island, Itaguaí |
Indonesia
| TBD | | | | | |
| TBD | | | | | |

== Gallery ==
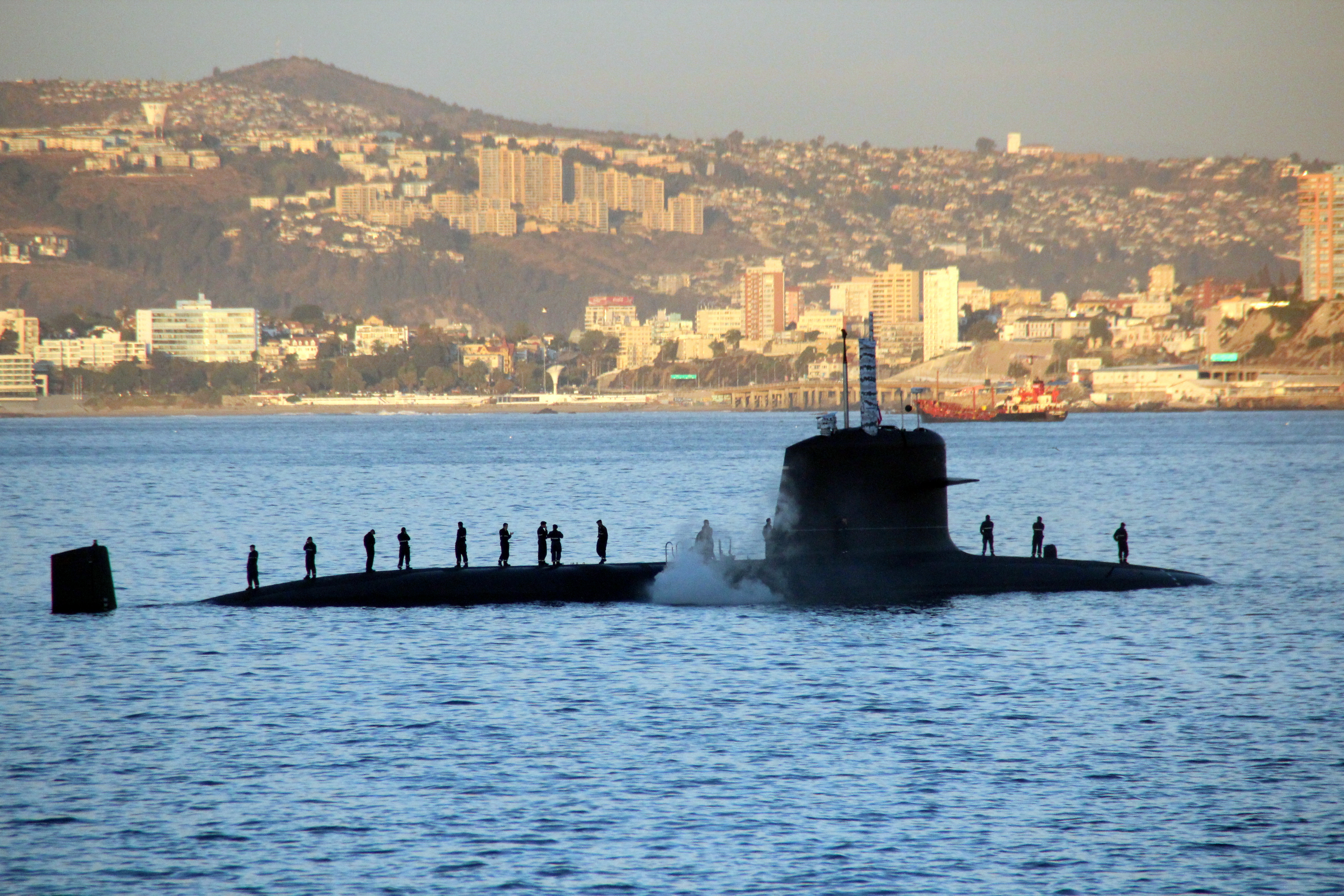
Chilean Navy's Scorpène class

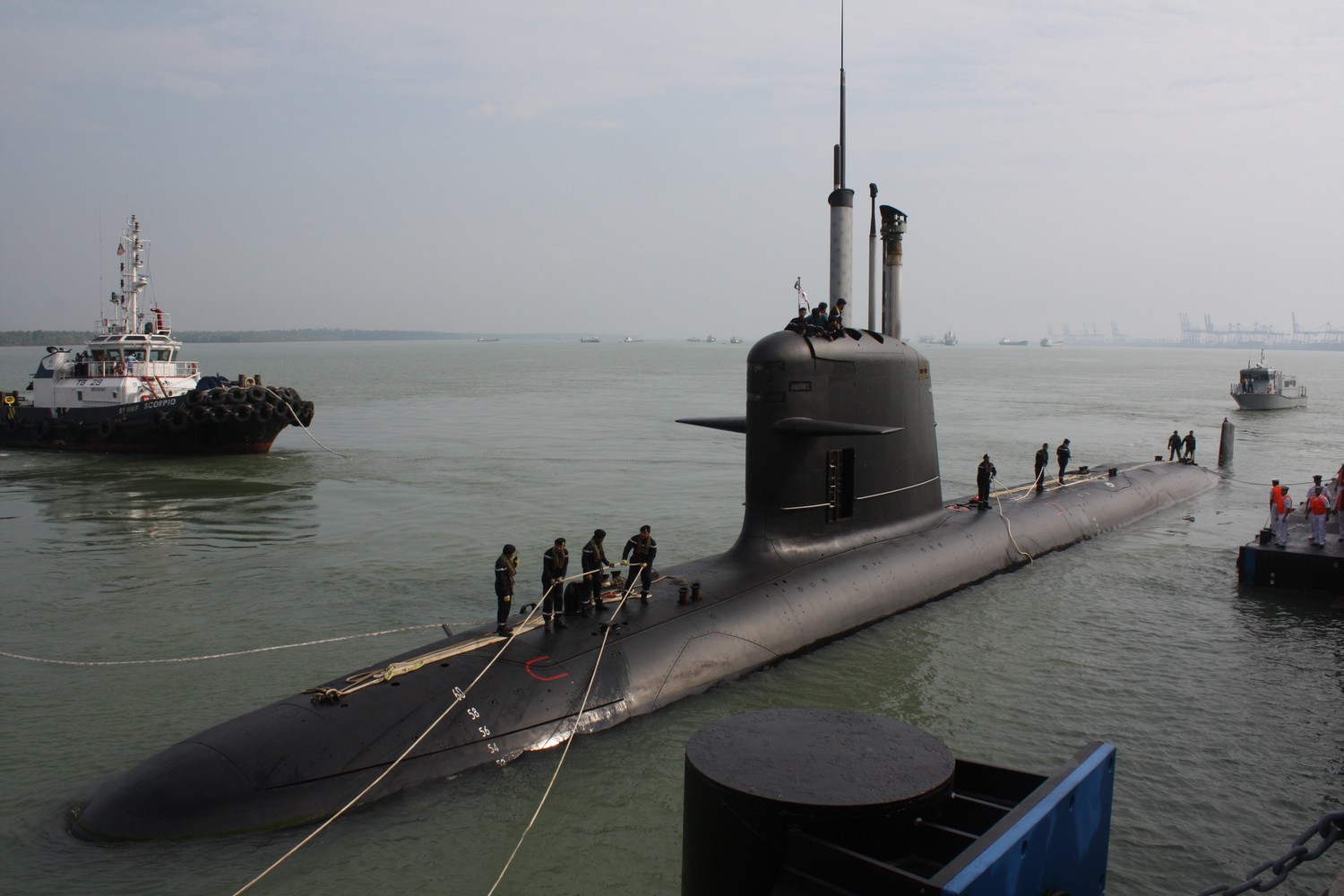
KD Tunku Abdul Rahman of the Royal Malaysian Navy circa 2009

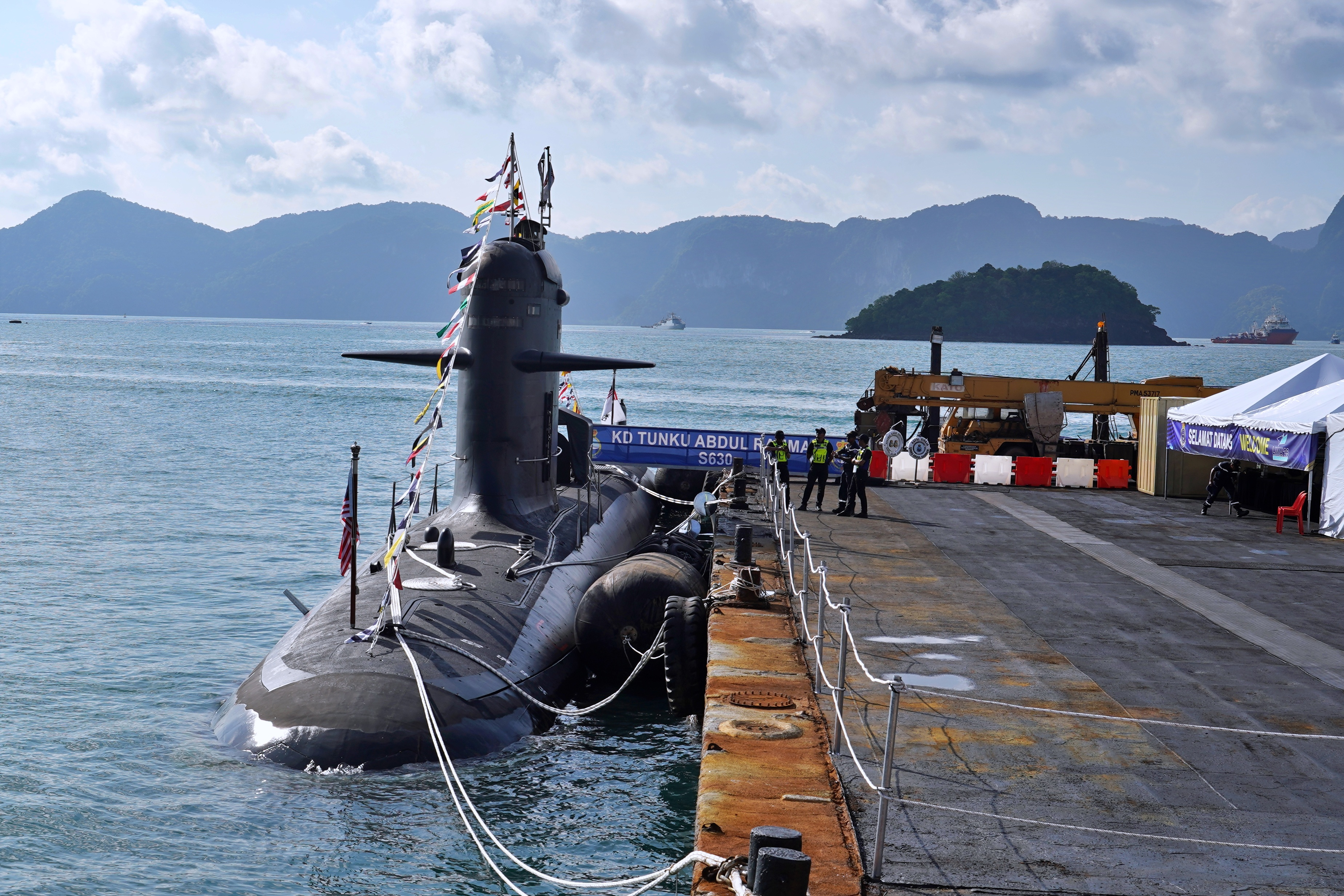
KD Tunku Abdul Rahman of the Royal Malaysian Navy in Langkawi circa 2023

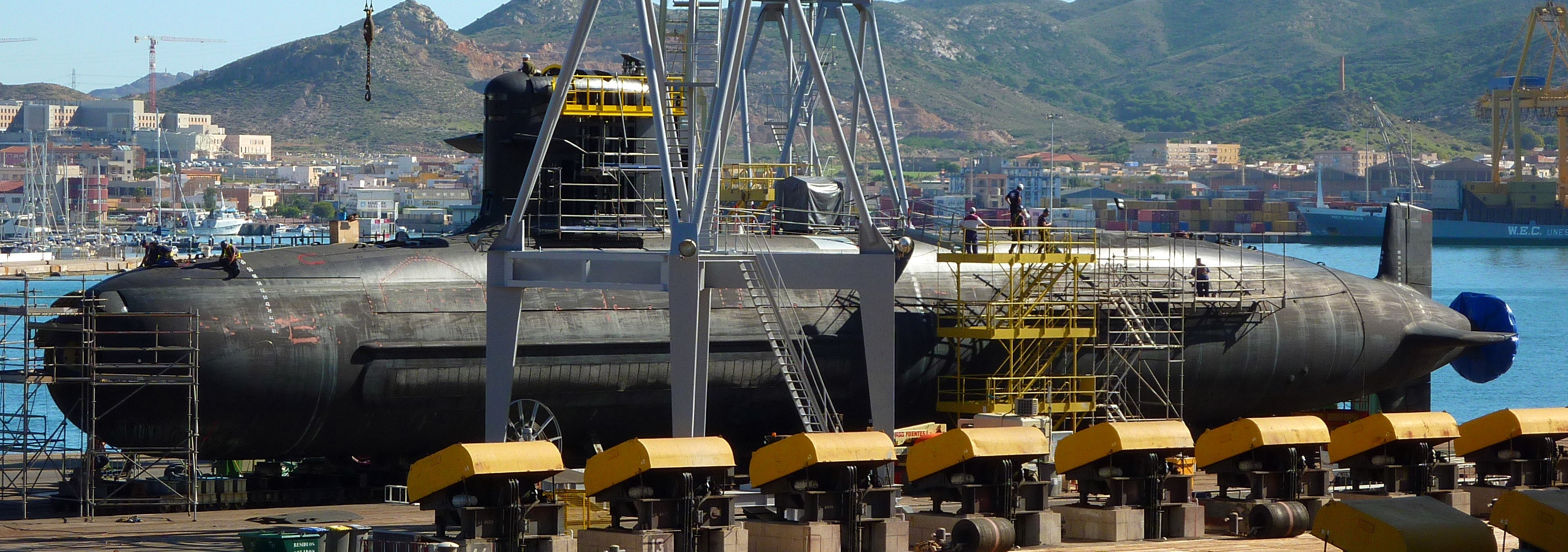
Royal Malaysian Navy's KD Tun Abdul Razak at a Navantia shipyard prior to delivery

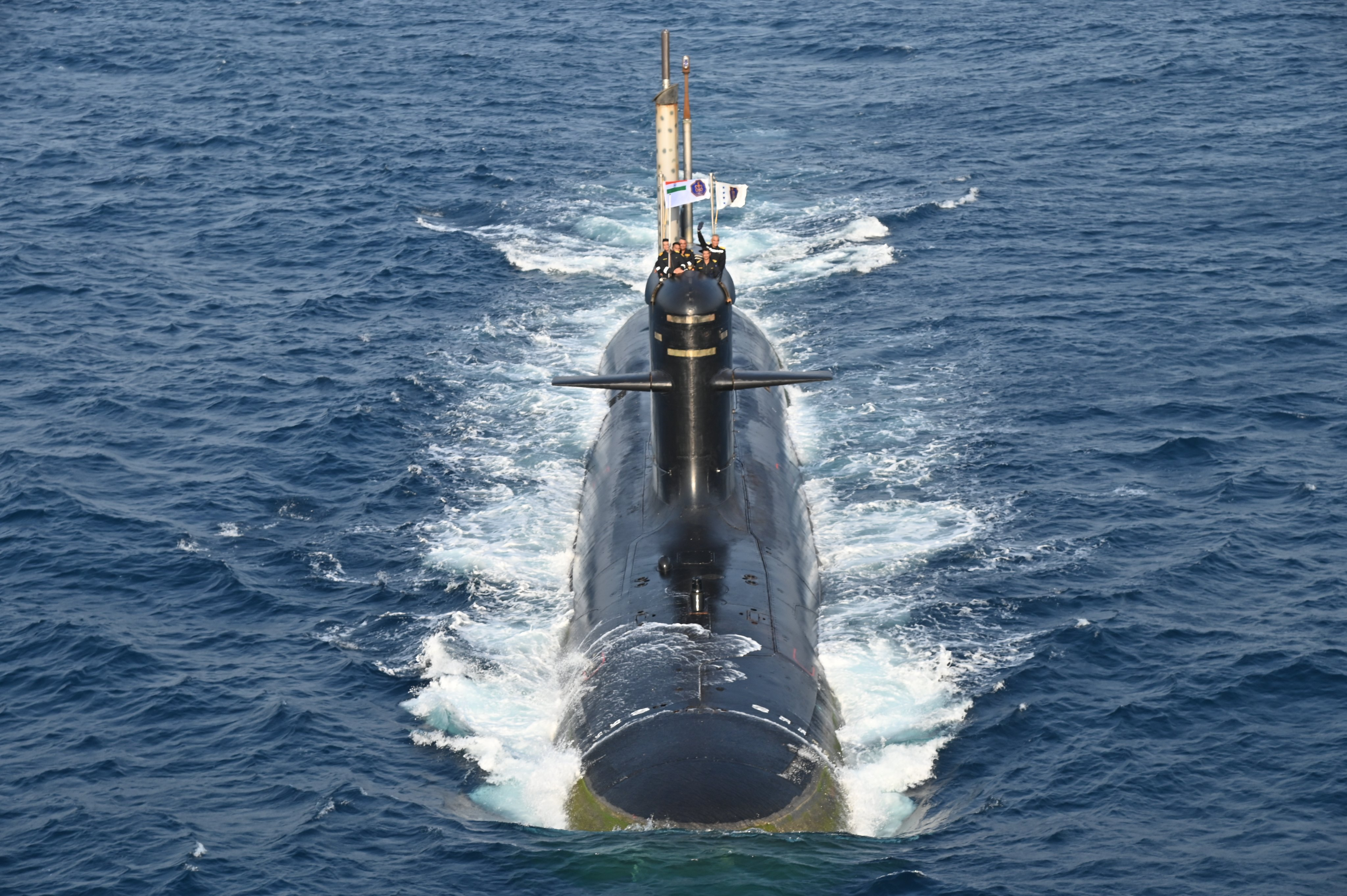
Indian Navy's Scorpène class up close during an exercise

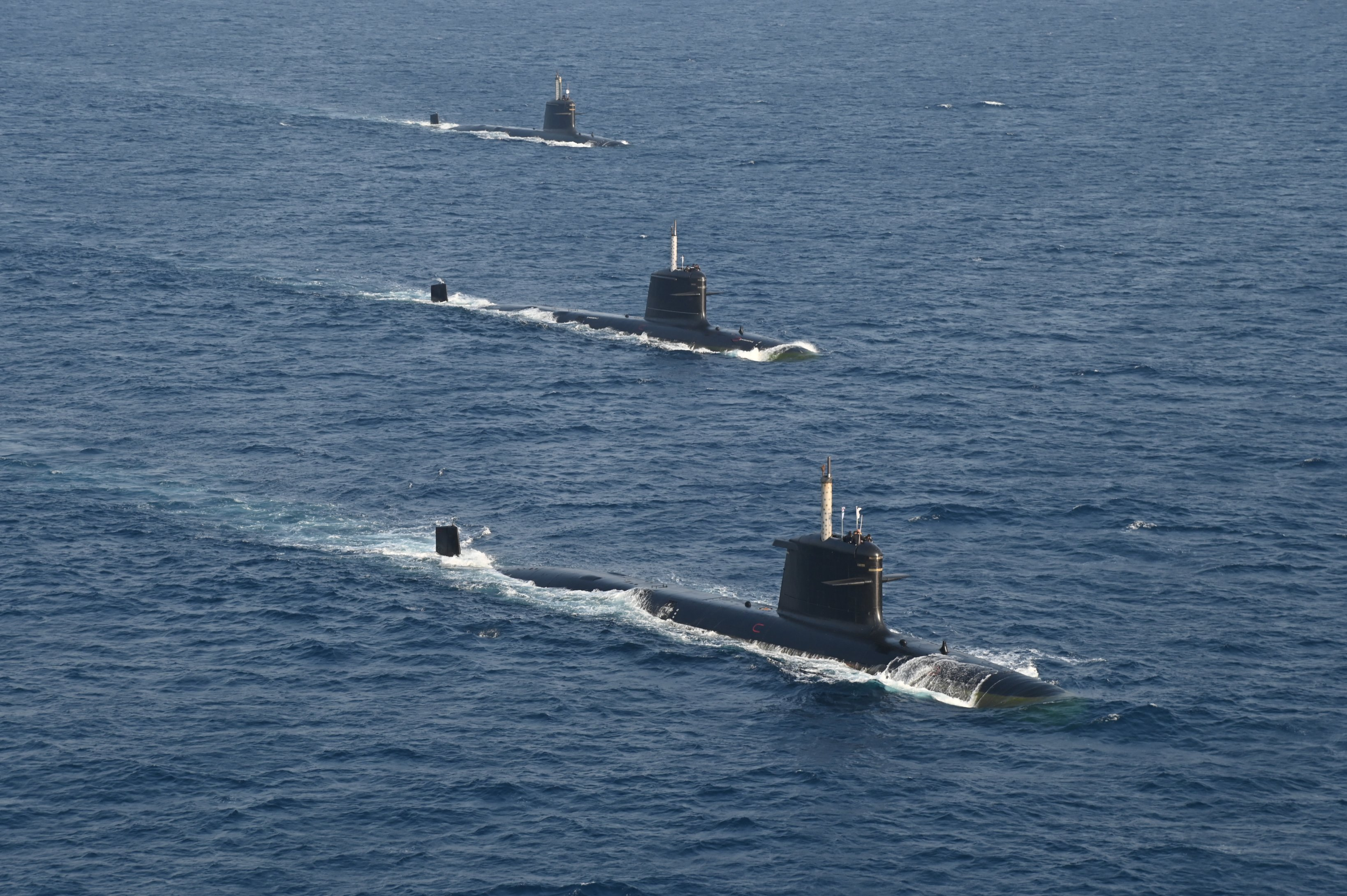
Trio of Indian Navy's Scorpène class during an exercise

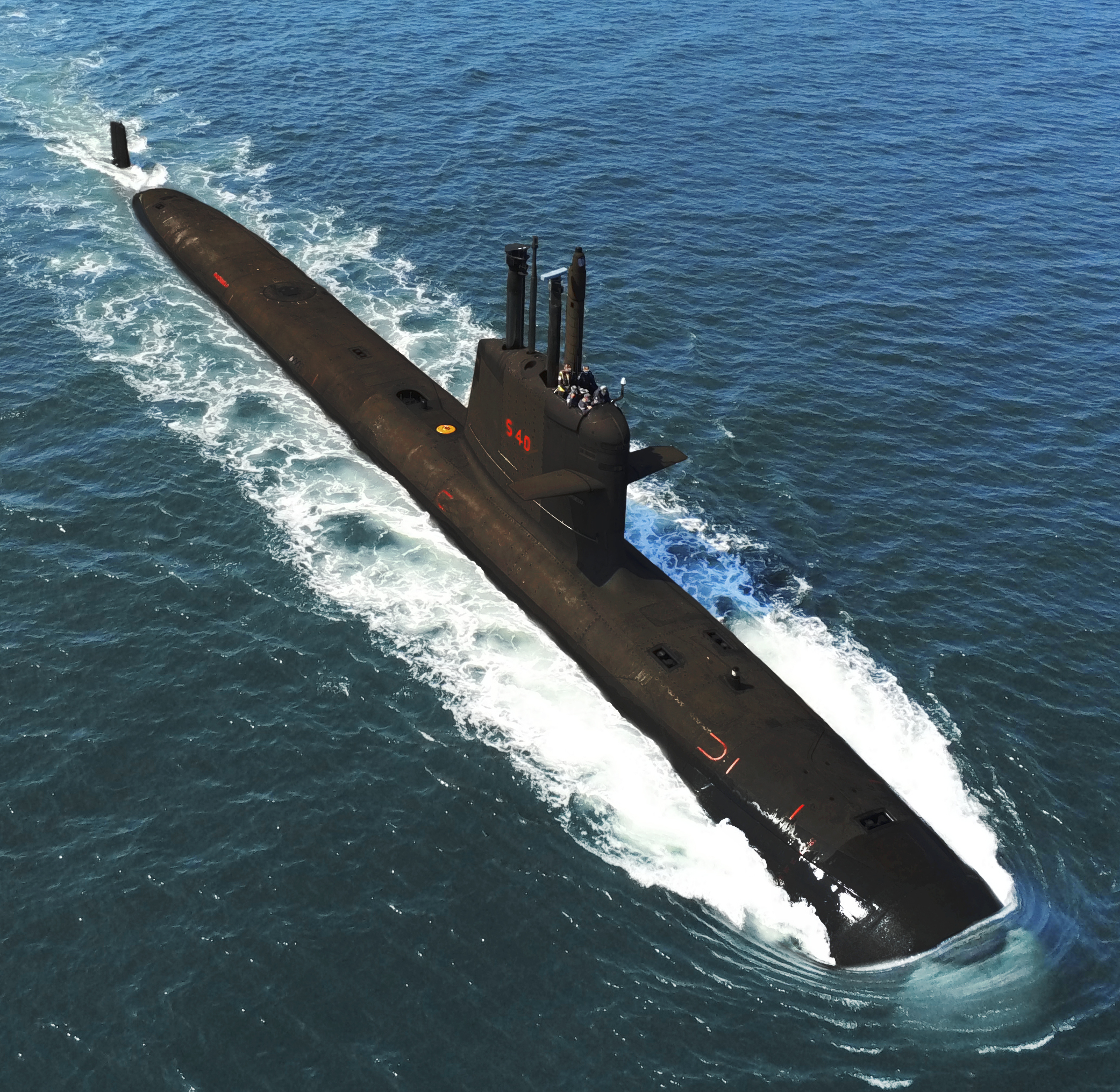
Riachuelo of the Brazilian Navy

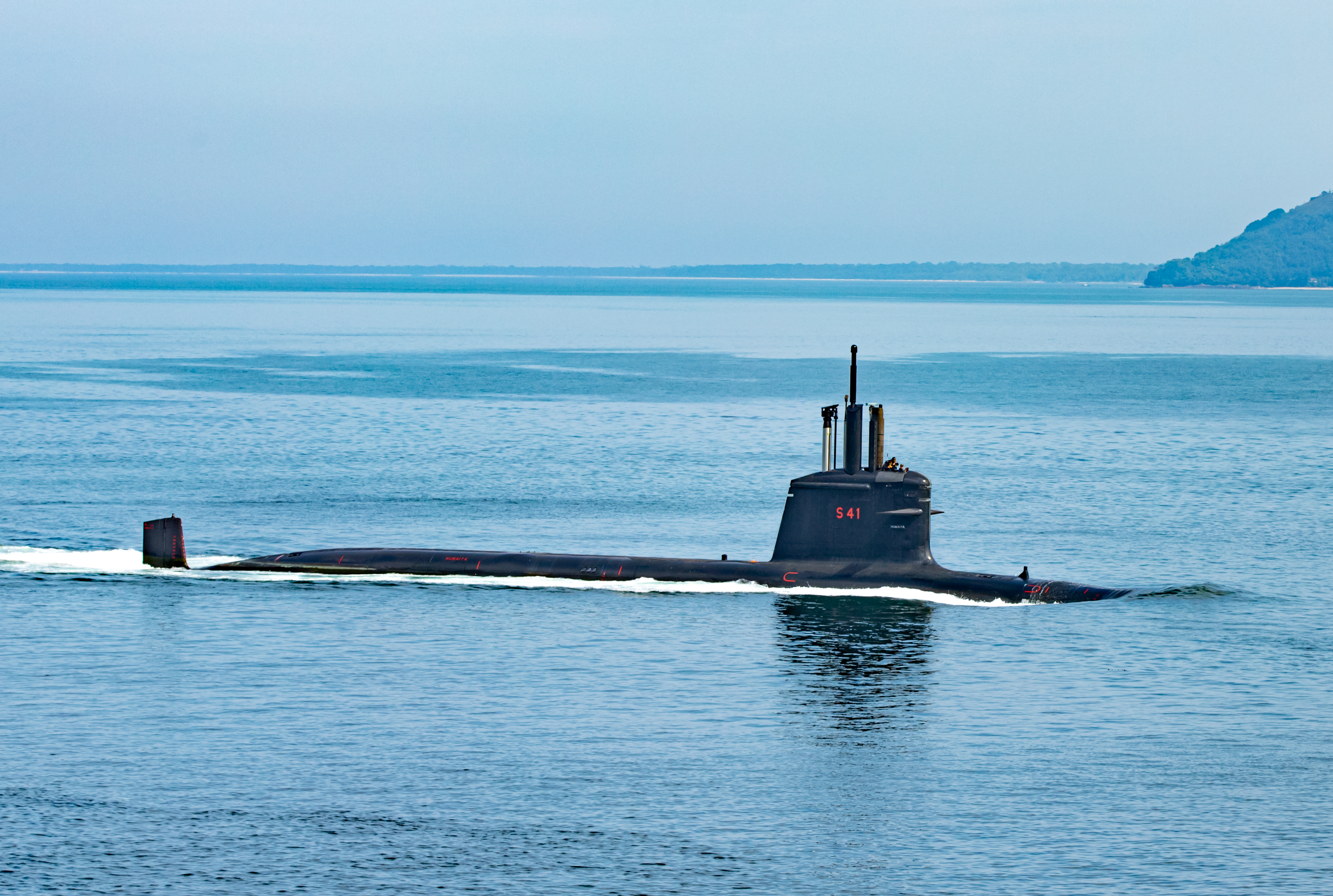
Humaitá of the Brazilian Navy

== Scorpène 1000 ==
See Andrasta-class submarine.

== See also ==
- List of submarine classes in service

=== Equivalent submarines of the same era ===
- Dolphin class
- Gotland class
- Song class
- Type 214
- Lada class
