= KD Tunku Abdul Rahman =

Submarine of the Royal Malaysian Navy

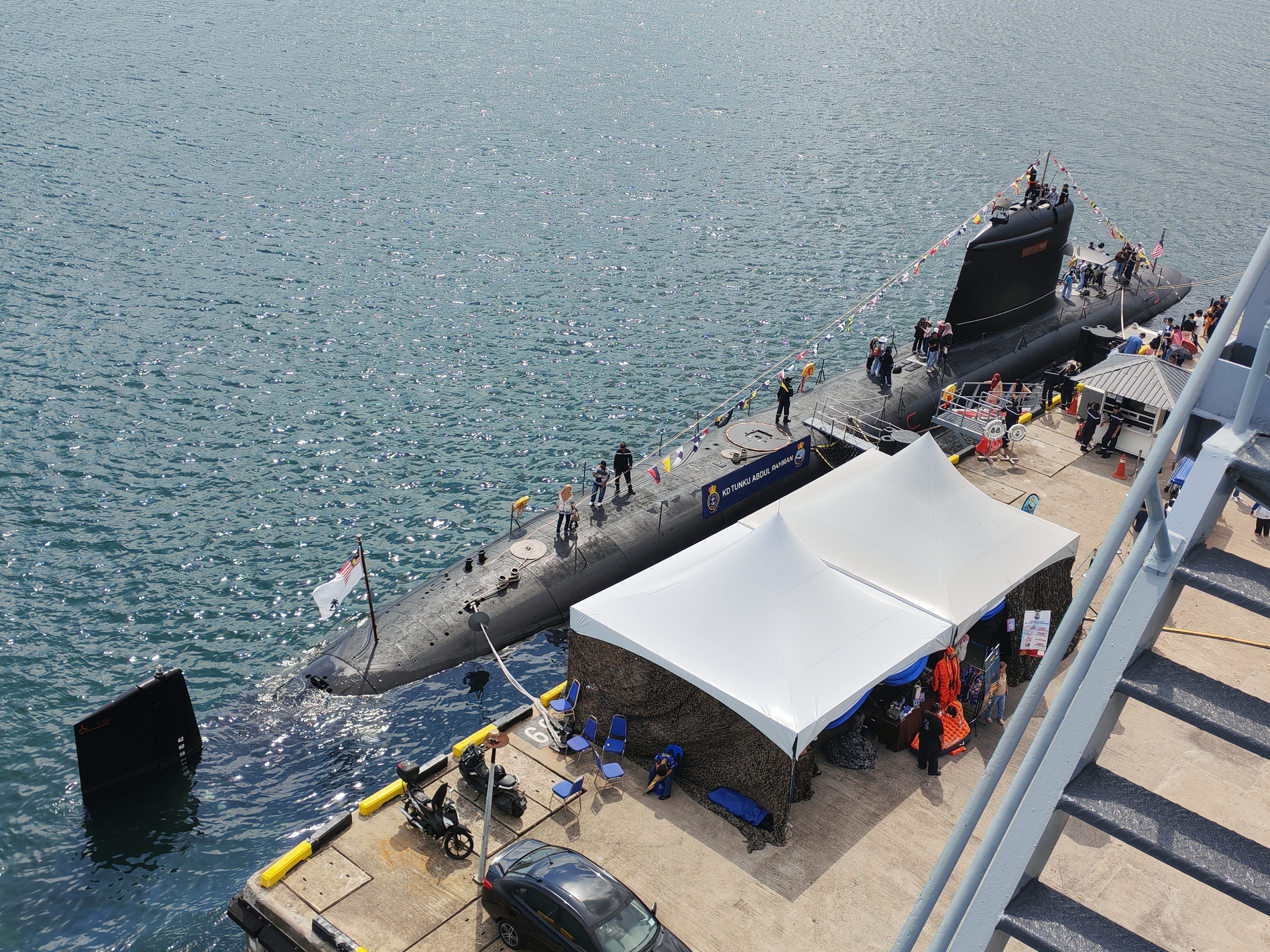
- KD Tunku Abdul Rahman at Sepanggar in May 2026 during Hari Terbuka Armada

History

Malaysia
- Name: KD Tunku Abdul Rahman
- Namesake: Tunku Abdul Rahman
- Ordered: June 2002
- Builder: Naval Group, Cherbourg
- Laid down: December 2003
- Launched: October 2007
- Commissioned: January 2009
- Home port: Sepanggar
- Status: Active
- Badge

General characteristics
- Class & type: Scorpène-class submarine
- Displacement: 1,577 long tons (1,602 t) surfaced; 1,711 long tons (1,738 t) submerged
- Length: 67.4 m (221 ft 2 in)
- Beam: 6.2 m (20 ft 4 in)
- Draft: 5.4 m (17 ft 9 in)
- Propulsion: 2 × SEMT-Pielstick 12 PA4 200SM DS diesels; 1 × Jeumont Industrie motor; 4,700 hp (3,505 kW); 1 shaft
- Speed: 12 knots (22 km/h; 14 mph) surfaced; 20.5 kn (38.0 km/h; 23.6 mph) submerged
- Range: 6,000 nmi (11,000 km; 6,900 mi) at 8 kn (15 km/h; 9.2 mph) surfaced; 360 nmi (670 km; 410 mi) at 4 kn (7.4 km/h; 4.6 mph) submerged
- Test depth: More than 300 m (980 ft)
- Complement: 32
- Sensors & processing systems: I-band navigation radar; Hull mounted, active/passive search and attack, medium frequency sonars
- Electronic warfare & decoys: Thales DR 3000 tactical ESM receiver
- Armament: 6 × 533 mm (21 in) torpedo tubes for 18 Whitehead Alenia Sistemi Subacquei Black Shark heavyweight torpedoes and SM-39 Exocet anti-ship missiles and 30 mines in place of torpedoes

KD Tunku Abdul Rahman is a Scorpène-class submarine built for the Royal Malaysian Navy by Naval Group, formerly known as DCNS in Cherbourg, France and Navantia in Cartagena, Spain.

== Development and design ==
The fore section was built at Naval Group and joined to the aft section, which was built by Navantia.

On 3 September 2009, Tunku Abdul Rahman arrived in Malaysia 54 days after sailing from Toulon for her new home. According to a September 2009 report in Malaysia's English-language The Sun, the submarine was expected to be formally commissioned into the Royal Malaysian Navy in October 2009.

== Gallery ==
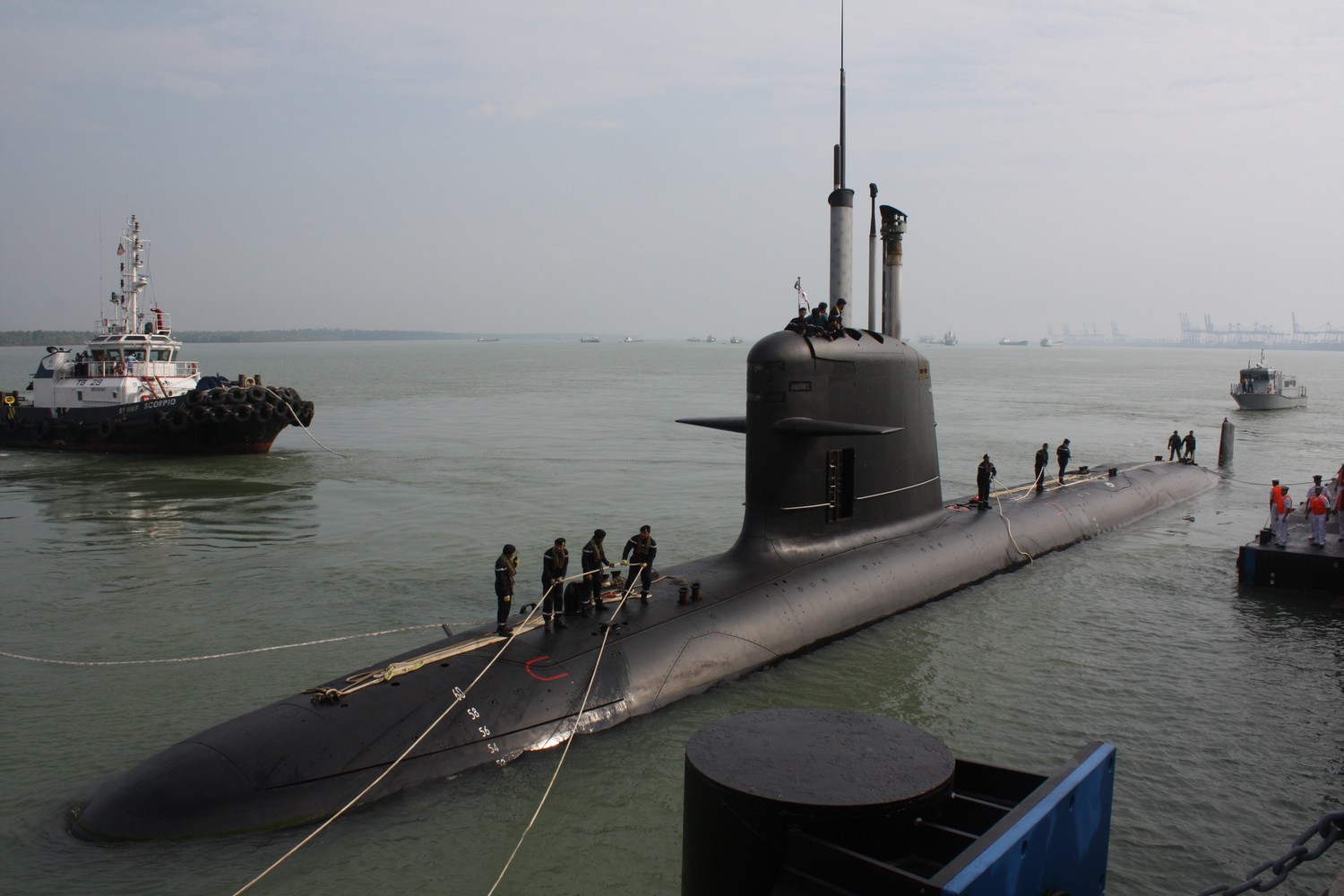
KD Tunku Abdul Rahman in September 2009.

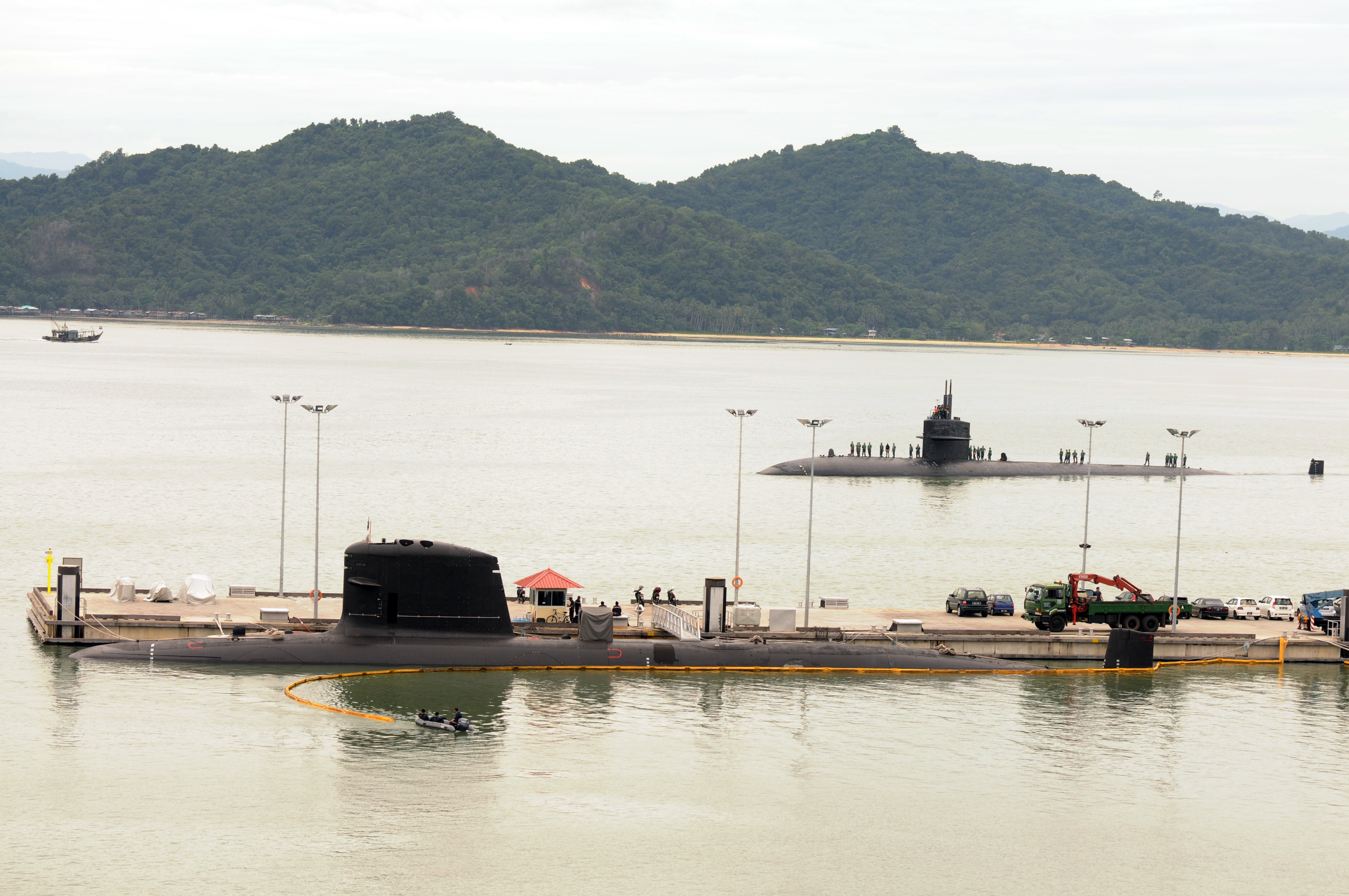
USS Jacksonville passing by KD Tunku Abdul Rahman at Sepanggar on 11 October 2010.

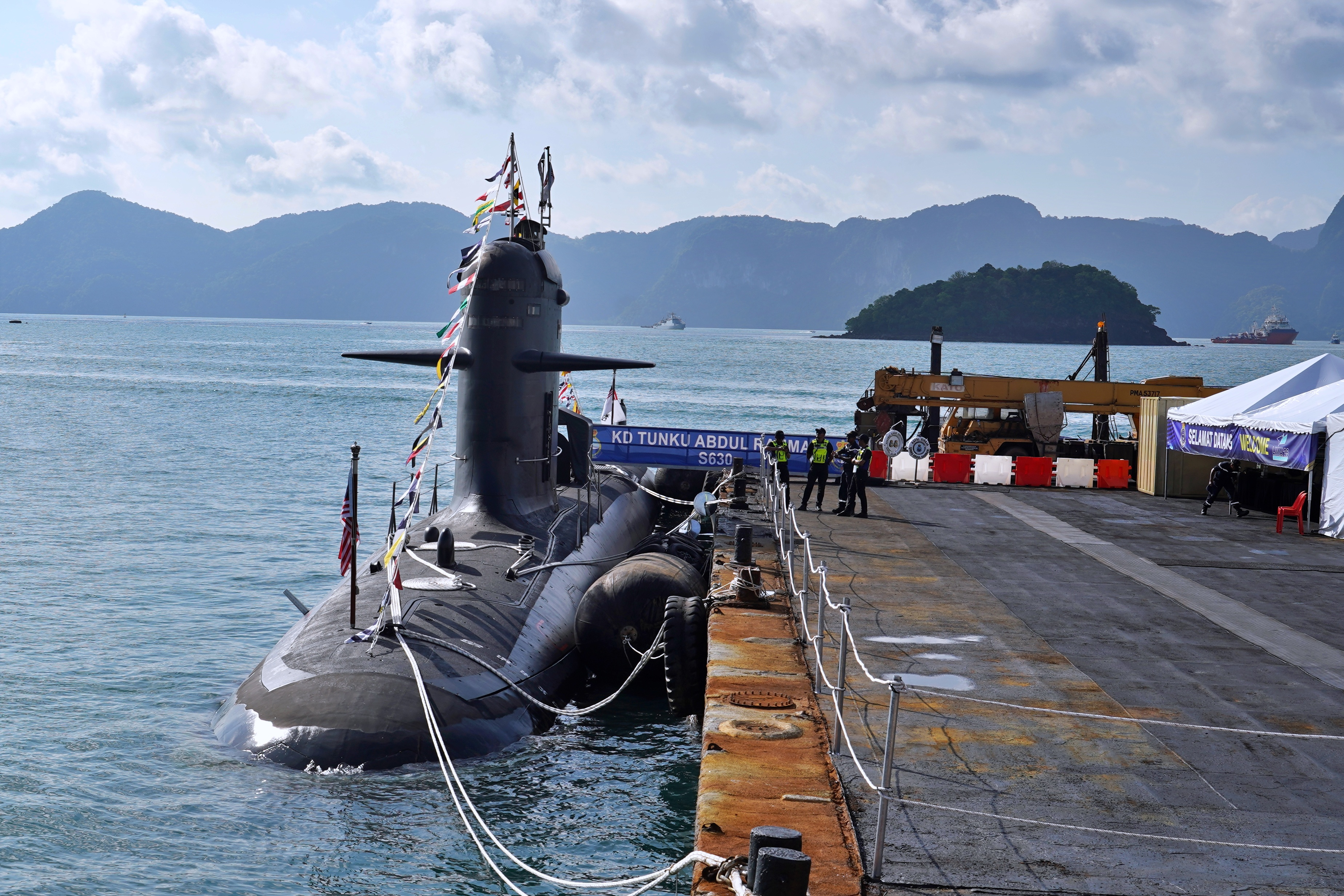
KD Tunku Abdul Rahman at Langkawi in 2023.
