= Andrasta-class submarine =

Submarine design concept

Class overview
- Name: Andrasta
- Active: None

General characteristics
- Type: Submarine
- Displacement: 855 t (841 long tons) (surfaced)
- Length: 48.8 m (160 ft 1 in)
- Draught: 6.5 m (21 ft 4 in)
- Propulsion: Single-screw diesel-electric, with batteries and AIP.
- Speed: 15 knots (28 km/h; 17 mph) (submerged)
- Range: 3,000 nmi (5,600 km; 3,500 mi)
- Endurance: 5 days (submerged)
- Test depth: >200 m (660 ft)
- Complement: 19 crew, plus 2 passengers and 6 divers
- Armament: Six torpedo tubes, which can also fire anti-ship missiles.; A3SM (Mistral SAM) mast option.
- Notes: Design concept only

Andrasta is a submarine design concept announced by the French shipbuilder DCNS in 2008. A development of the Scorpène-class submarine and based on the previous SMX-23 concept, it is a smaller vessel optimised for shallow water operations. DCNS advertising material for the ship concept, in a PDF document with a date-time stamp of 19 October 2008, includes information and digital illustrations that reveal the torpedo tube configuration and other details. The draught of the proposed submarine is apparent from the numbered depth markings shown on the hull in one of the illustrations. It is designed for anti-submarine and anti-surface warfare, as well as intelligence gathering and special operations.

This design evolved into the Scorpène 1000.
