= Naval Group =

Naval defence company based in France

- Formerly: DCNS
- Type: Société anonyme
- Industry: Defence, Shipbuilding, Engineering
- Predecessor: Direction des Constructions Navales
- Founded: 1631; 395 years ago
- Founder: French government under Armand Jean du Plessis de Richelieu
- Headquarters: Paris, Île-de-France, France
- Area served: Worldwide
- Key people: Pierre-Éric Pommellet (CEO)
- Products: Warships, shipboard weapons, offshore engineering, nuclear engineering marine renewable energies
- Revenue: ▲€4.68 billion (2025)
- Operating income: ▲€304 million (2025)
- Net income: ▲€267 million (2025)
- Total assets: ▲€8.49 billion (2024)
- Total equity: ▲€1.98 billion (2025)
- Owner: French state: 62.49% Thales: 35% Company & employees: 2.51%
- Number of employees: 17,170 (2025)
- Subsidiaries: Naval Energies, Sirehna, Kership
- Website: www.naval-group.com

Naval Group is a French industrial group specialising in naval defense design, development and construction. Its headquarters are located in Paris, France.

Heir to the French naval dockyards initiated in 1631 by Cardinal Richelieu and to the Direction des Constructions et Armes Navales (DCAN), which became Direction des Constructions Navales (DCN) in 1991 and then DCNS in 2007, the company was rebranded Naval Group in 2017. Its two main shareholders are the French State (62.25%) and Thales Group (35%).

As of 2024, Naval Group employs 15,261 people across 17 countries.

== History ==
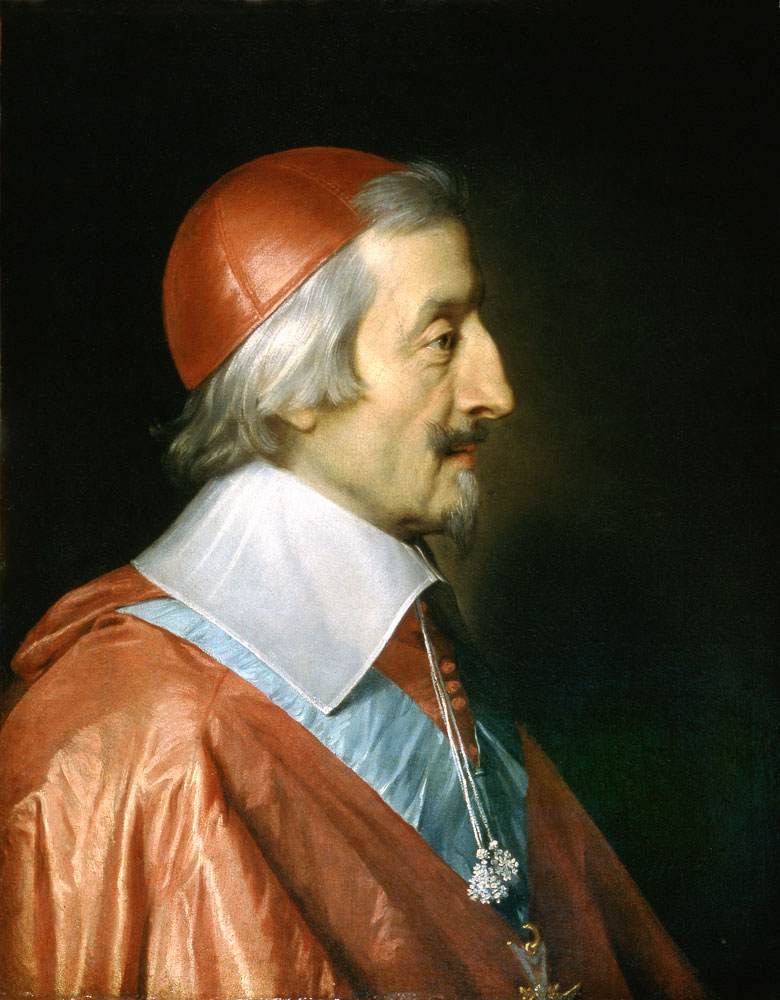
Cardinal Richelieu (1585–1642), founder

Naval Group has a heritage of almost 400 years. Major shipyards were built in France in Brest (1631), Nantes-Indret (1771), Lorient (1778) and, subsequently, Cherbourg (1813). Others were to follow. As early as 1926, what we know as the Naval Group today already had all the facilities now owned by the group in mainland France.

=== The birth of the naval dockyards ===
In 1624, Cardinal Richelieu, who was King Louis XIII's Prime Minister, devised a policy meant to expand France's maritime capabilities. This policy was put into practice from 1631, with the creation of the Ponant fleet in the Atlantic and the Levant fleet in the Mediterranean, the foundation of the Brest dockyards as well as the extension of the Toulon dockyards built under King Henri IV.

The policy was continued by Colbert, Louis XIV's Navy Minister, who developed several major dockyards. He extended the dockyards in Toulon, ordered the excavation of the docks in Brest and founded the Rochefort dockyards. His son, Seignelay, who succeeded him in 1683, followed in his footsteps.

The French Royal Navy's network of dockyards was further strengthened in the 18th century. In 1750, the Marquis de Montalembert converted a former paper mill into a forge producing cannons at Ruelle-sur-Touvre. In 1777, Antoine de Sartine, Louis XVI's Navy Minister, opened a cannon foundry near the naval shipyards in Indret. In the same year, work started on the development of the port in Cherbourg, which was completed in 1813. In 1778, the Lorient naval dockyards succeeded La Compagnie des Indes du port de L’Orient.

The naval dockyards in Rochefort were closed in 1926. In 1937, the establishment in Saint-Tropez was opened on the former site of the company Schneider, which specialised in torpedoes. By this time, most of the Naval Group's French sites already existed, and they have not changed since then.

=== Industrialisation and technical innovations ===
During the 19th century, the naval dockyards underwent a transformation as the fleet of sailing ships and were replaced by motorised vessels. The sites were industrialised and gradually specialised. In 1865, the naval dockyards in Brest became exclusively military, with the closure of the Penfeld port to commercial vessels. In 1898, after specialising in the building of vessels with propellers rather than sails, the shipyards in Cherbourg were tasked exclusively with the construction of submarines. Finally, in 1927, a decree definitively laid out the missions of the various naval dockyards: Brest and Lorient were tasked with the construction of large vessels, Cherbourg with building submarines, while Toulon, Bizerte and Saigon took charge of the maintenance of the fleet.

This rationalisation of the roles of the naval dockyards was accompanied by technical and military innovations and the production of vessels at a higher pace, against the backdrop of an arms race and colonisation. In 1858, Gloire, the first ocean-going battleship in the world sailed out of the dockyards in Toulon. The 1860s saw the arrival of the first torpedo boats and military submarines, with the launch of Plongeur in 1863. The technical problems experienced by this first-ever motorised submarine meant that it remained a prototype rather than an operational war vessel. But it did open the way for the construction of Gymnote in 1886 and Le Narval in 1899, which were the first operational torpedo submarines in history.

The production of heavy surface vessels was also stepped up in the 1910s. Several battleships were built before the start of the First World War, and the fleet was strengthened by the 35,000-ton Richelieu in 1939.

=== Reorganisation of activities ===
In 1946, a review of the French naval dockyards completed the attributions of the various sites announced in the 1927 decree. Brest was tasked with the production and repair of large vessels, Lorient with the construction of medium-sized vessels, Cherbourg with submarines and Toulon with repairing and maintaining the fleet. Amongst the inland sites, Indret took over the vessel propulsion activities, Ruelle the construction of guns, large parts and electronics, Saint-Tropez the production of torpedoes and Guérigny the construction of naval chains and anchors. Five sites are located overseas: Mers el-Kébir, Bizerte, Dakar, Diego-Suarez and Papeete.

Until 1961, the French navy maintained and repaired its fleet itself, through the Directions des Constructions et Armes Navales (DCAN) in the naval dockyards. The engineers working in the DCANs were officers in the French navy's engineering division. At this time, the dockyards broke away from the Navy, creating the opportunity for the diversification of their activities in the 1970s.

A single DCAN covered all the mainland and overseas naval dockyards, reporting to the Direction Technique des Constructions Navales (DTCN). In turn, the DTCN was answerable to the Délégation Ministérielle pour l’Armement (DMA), set up by Michel Debré. In 1977, the DMA became the Délégation Générale de l’Armement (DGA). The purpose of this reform was to centralise all the armed forces' design and construction capacities in a single inter-armed forces delegation operating under the government's authority.

In 1958, the official launch by General de Gaulle of the French military nuclear programme and deterrent policy prompted the restructuring of the defence industry and defence technology.

The Cœlacanthe project brought together the DTCN and the French Alternative Energies and Atomic Energy Commission, and in 1971, Redoutable, the first French missile-launching nuclear submarine, came into service.

=== Transformation into a company ===
The international economic climate and decolonisation in the 1970s lead the DCAN to venture into new markets. The loss of the overseas naval dockyards was compounded by the French Navy's reduced need for vessels and the increased difficulty in obtaining funding. This trend gathered more pace after the end of the Cold War, despite the diversification of the DCAN activities, which now included maintaining the electric power network and clearing mines from the coastline. Some sites also specialised in civilian projects: Brest built trucks, Guérigny made agricultural machinery and Toulon produced civilian vessels (yachts, liners).

But, looking beyond the order books, it was the public status of the DCAN that was gradually called into question, and it came to be considered as an administrative obstacle to the development of the potential of France's naval dockyards.

This transformation occurred in several stages. In 1991, the DCAN was christened the DCN (Direction des Construction Navales). In the same year, DCN International was created. The mission of this PLC was to promote the activities of the DCN on an international scale and to facilitate the export of its products.

In 1992, the DCN's activities for the state were attached to the Naval Programmes department (SPN), which was the contracting authority for vessels for the French navy. Since then, the DCN has only been responsible for industrial activities, while remaining part of the DGA. This change of status has allowed DCN International to provide the DCN with commercial and legal support in the development of its international trade since the end of the 1990s.

The development strategy pursued by DCN International resulted in the signing of several major contracts. In 1994, three Agosta-class submarines were delivered to Pakistan, and, in 1997, two Scorpène-class submarines were built for Chile. A contract was also won in 2000 to supply six Formidable-class frigates to Singapore. In 2007, a contract was signed with Malaysia for two Scorpène submarines, through the subsidiary Armaris.

The DCN has also won contracts in the field of off-shore drilling for oil. In 1997, the Brest site modernised the Sedco 707 platform and now builds SFX type oil rigs.

In 1999, the DCN became an agency with national authority (SCN), reporting directly to the Ministry of Defence. Finally, in 2001, the French government decided to transform the DCN into a fully state-owned private limited company. The change of status came into effect in 2003. The DCN became just DCN, which no longer stood for Direction des Constructions Navales.

=== The development and continuation of the DCNS group ===
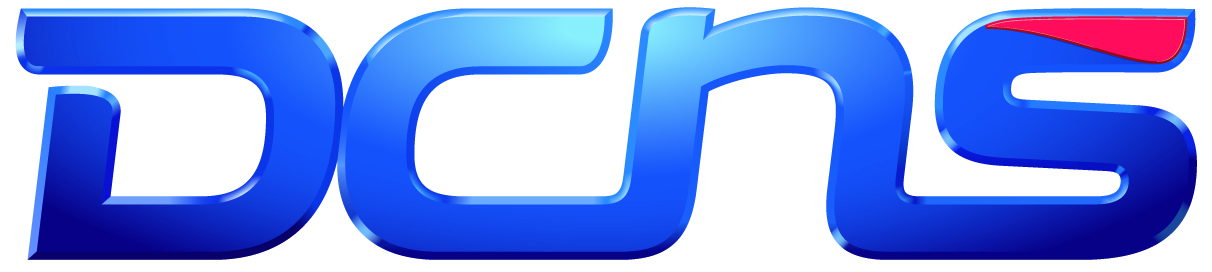
DCNS Logo from 2007 to 2017

In 2007, DCN acquired the French naval activities branch of Thales, Armaris, a former subsidiary that was equally shared between DCN and Thales, and MOPA2, the company in charge of the project to build a second aircraft carrier. To stress its new identity, the resulting group was named DCNS. Thales acquired a 25% stake in the group's capital. In 2011, Thales increased its share of DCNS' capital to 35%.

Construction of the stealthy multi-function frigates (FREMM) started in 2007. In 2008, an aerial drone landed on the deck of a frigate at sea for the first time in history. In 2013, the group set up DCNS Research to promote its research activities. DCNS India, today Naval Group India was founded in 2008, thanks to two contracts signed in 2005 and 2008 for the delivery of six conventional Scorpène-class submarines. Similarly, in 2013, a submarine construction site was opened in Brazil. The group created the DCNS University in 2013 to deliver internal and external training.

On 28 June 2017, DCNS changed its name to Naval Group.

== Activities ==
Naval Group's activities can be broken down into two main sectors: naval defence, the group's historical core business (ships, submarines, operational readiness management of the forces). In 2021, Naval Group stops its activities in the area of maritime renewable energy.

Naval Group designs, develops and manages the operational readiness of surface and underwater naval systems, and their associated systems and infrastructures. As a project manager and integrator of armed vessels, Naval Group intervenes all along the value chain, from strategic programme planning, to design, construction and the management of operational readiness.

The group works with the French navy and other navies, for conventional products, and with the authorisation of the French government. It also offers its military expertise to the French Air Force to design automated navigation and combat systems, and to renovate aircraft.

=== Surface naval systems ===
- Aircraft carriers: French aircraft carrier Charles de Gaulle, Future French aircraft carrier
- Helicopter carriers: Mistral-class LHD
- Multi-mission frigates: FREMM-class frigates & Frégate de défense et d'intervention-class frigates (planned); La Fayette-class frigate
- Multi-mission frigates: Design of Second Generation Patrol Vessel for the Royal Malaysian Navy, based on the Gowind-class corvette
- Air defence frigates: Horizon-class frigates
- Medium-tonnage vessels: Gowind-class corvettes
- Construction of aerial drones for the navy
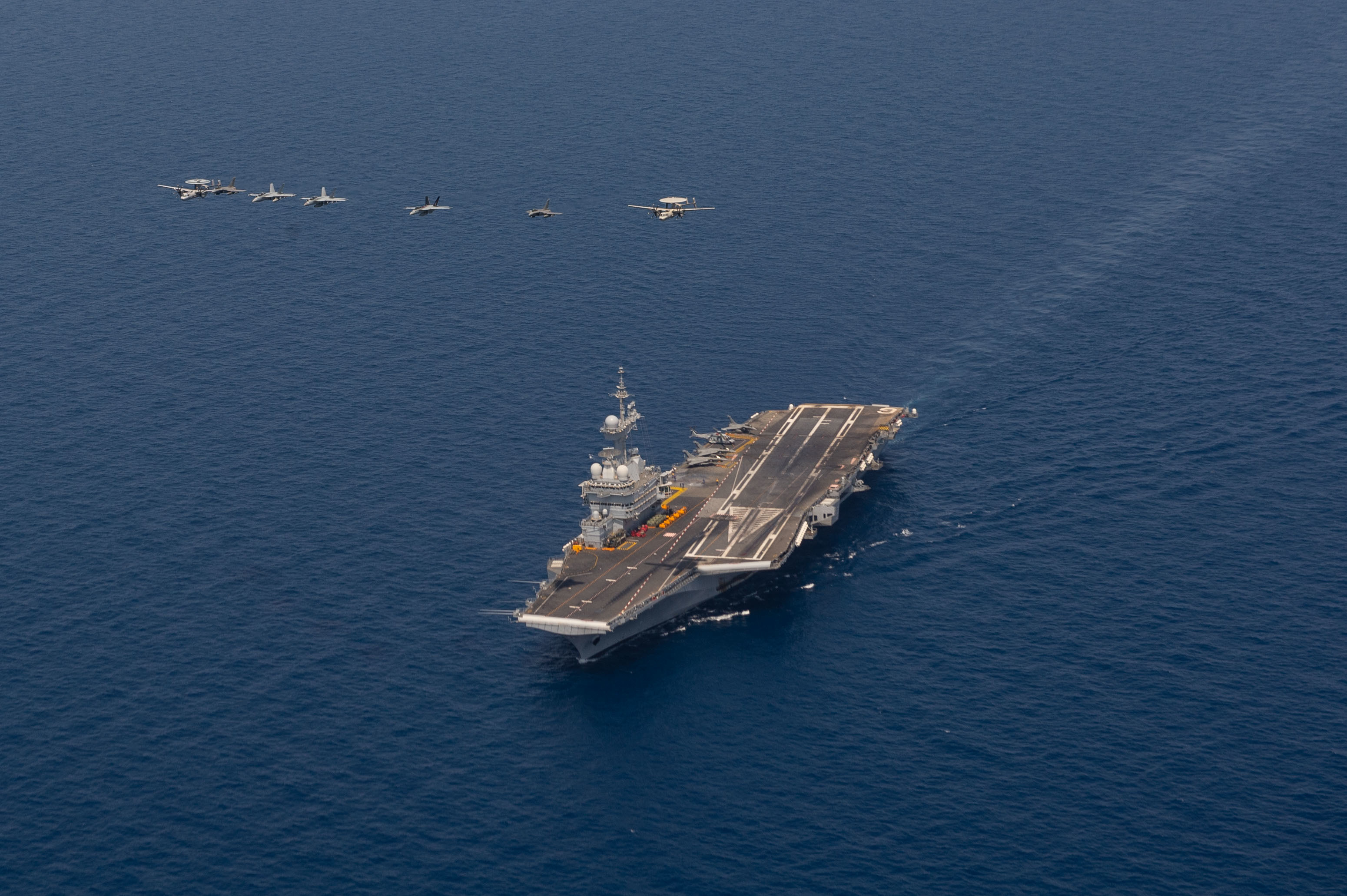
French nuclear aircraft carrier Charles De Gaulle

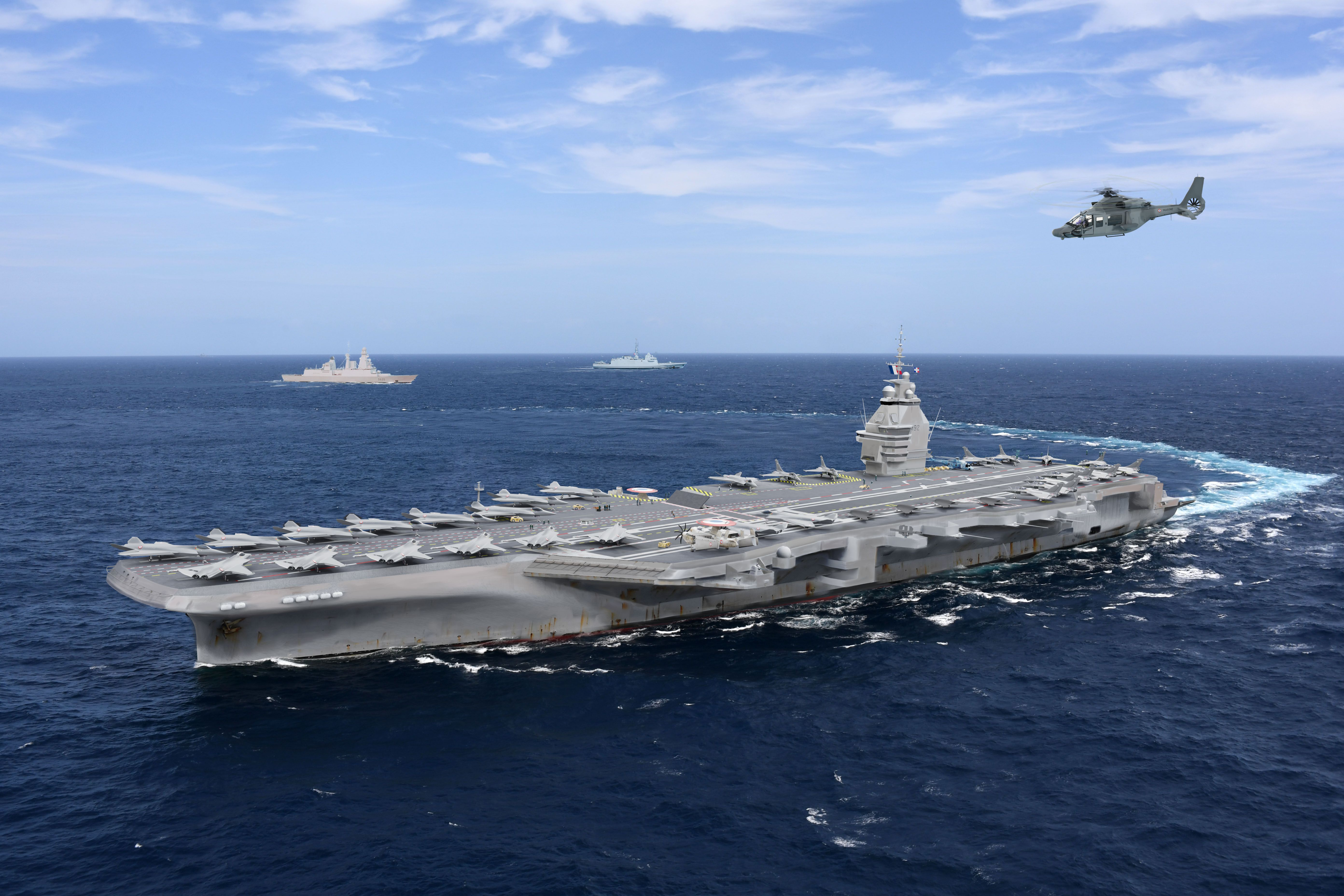
Future French aircraft carrier PANG

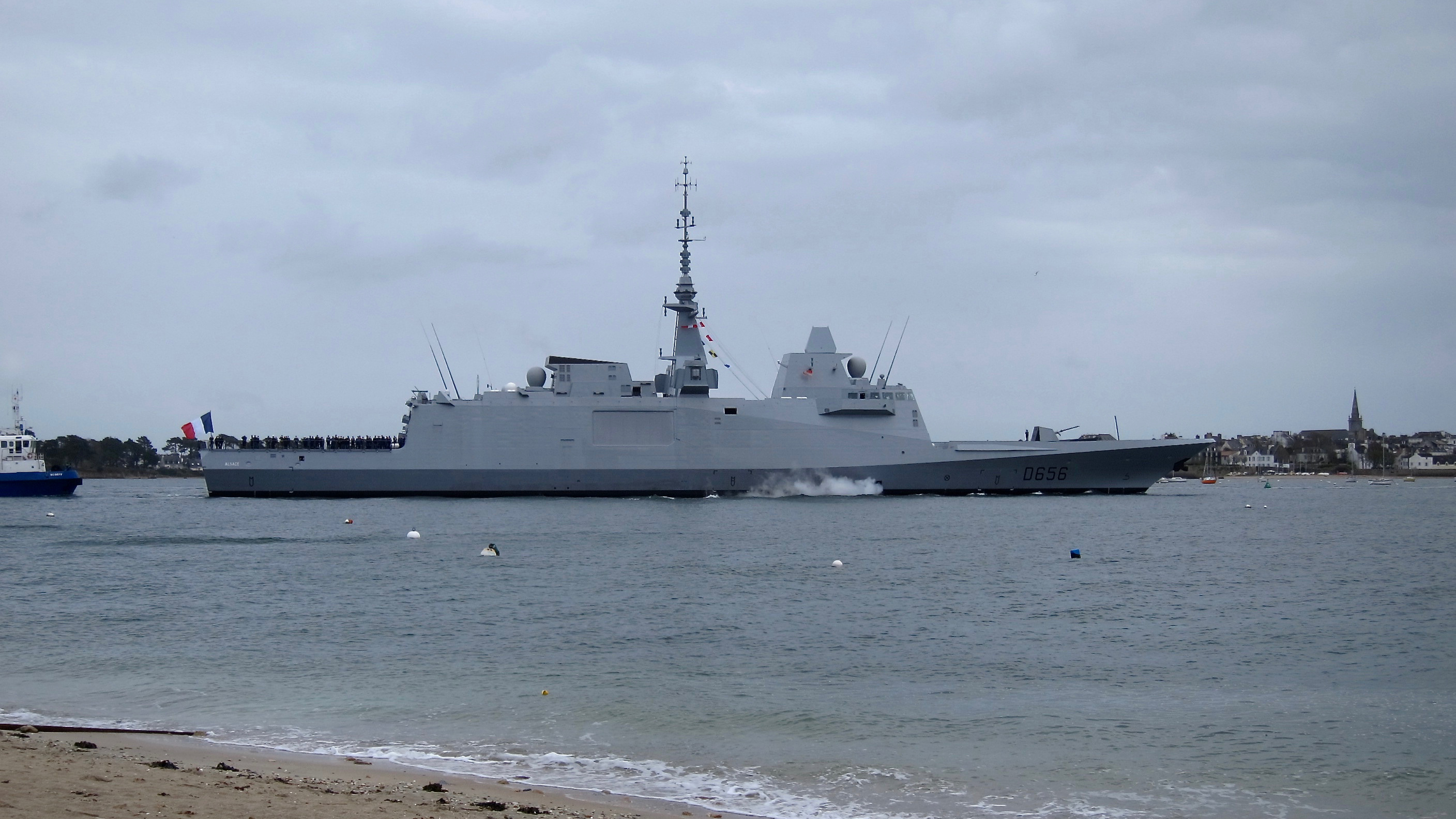
Multi-mission frigates FREMM

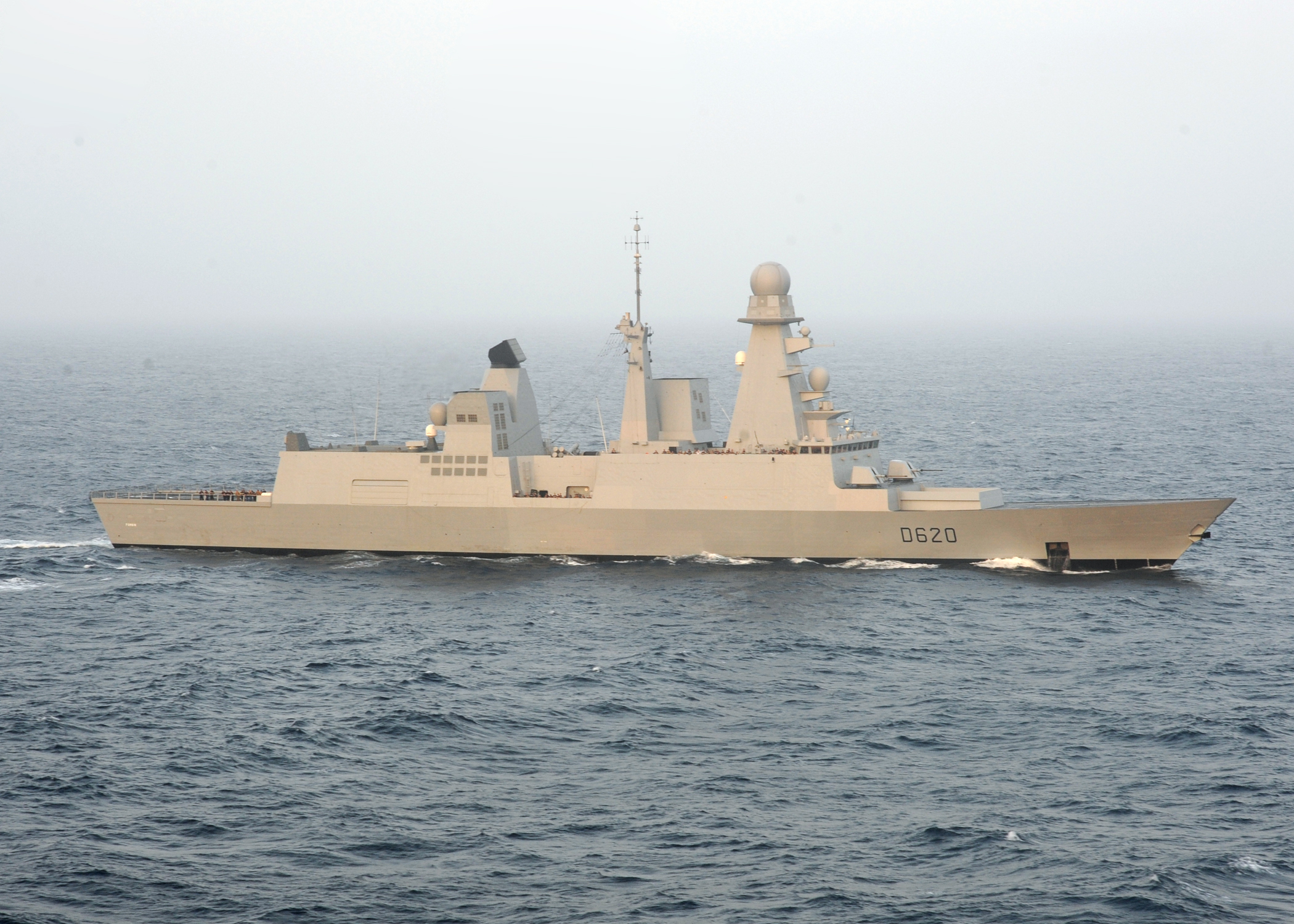
Air defence destroyers Horizon

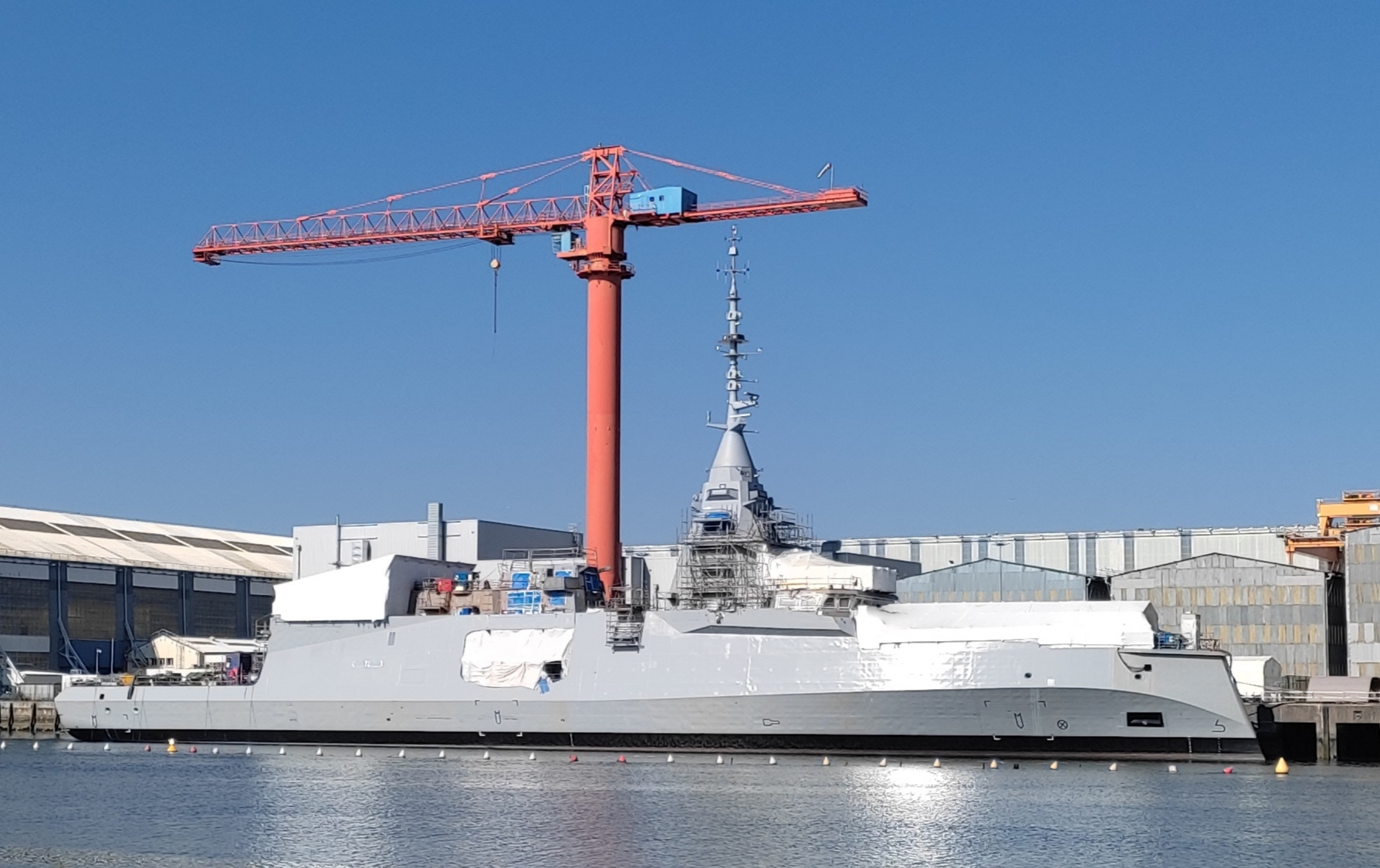
Defence and intervention frigate FDI

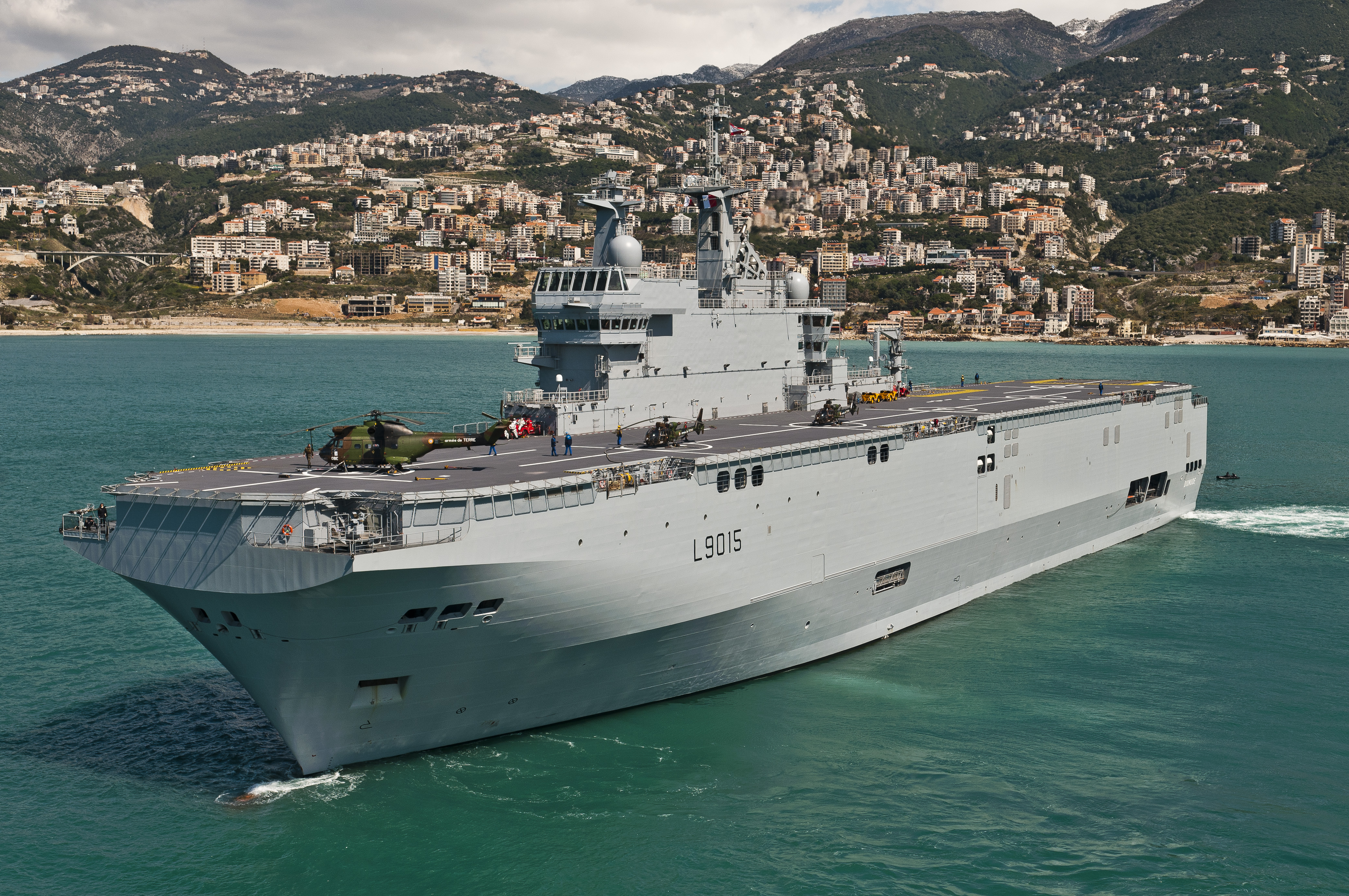
Helicopter carriers Mistral

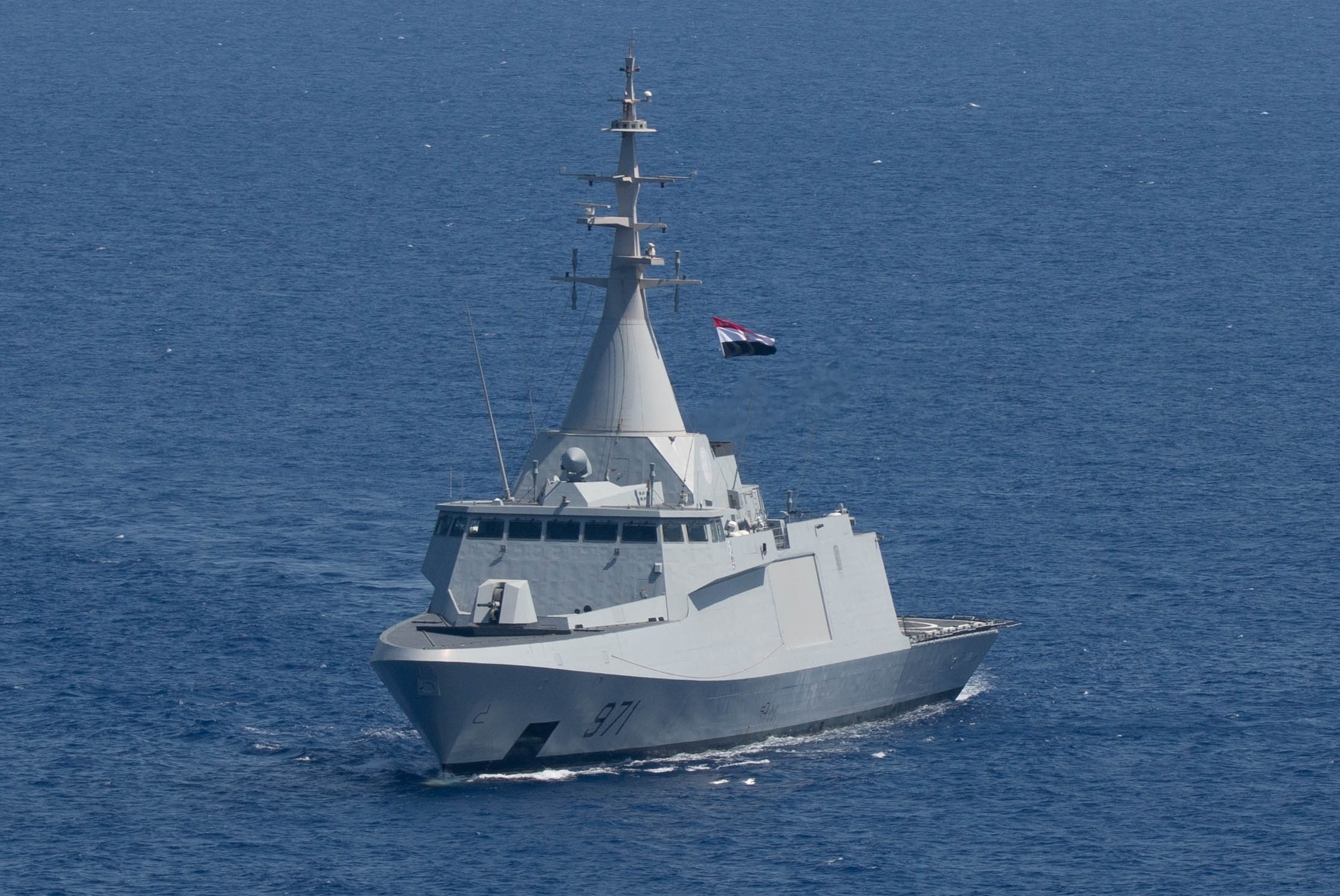
Corvettes and offshore patrol vessels GOWIND

=== Submarines and underwater weapons ===
- Conventional submarines: Orka class, Scorpène class, Andrasta class and Attack class
- Nuclear submarines: ballistic missile nuclear submarines Triomphant class and Redoutable class
- Nuclear submarines: nuclear attack submarines Rubis class and Barracuda class
- Hybrid concepts: the company's Sous-Marin Experimental (SMX) series explores advanced concepts for submarine warfare. One in the series—the SMX-25—was designed to arrive in theatre rapidly through high surface speed and then operate as normal underwater.
- Suffren class: Nuclear submarines: nuclear attack submarines Rubis class and Barracuda class: Barracuda (class Suffren)
- F21 heavy-weight torpedoes
- MU90 light-weight torpedoes

=== Energy and marine infrastructures ===
The group collaborates with EDF, the CEA and AREVA in the construction of EPR power plants and the maintenance of nuclear power plants. Naval Group also builds thermal electric power plants and naval bases. The group designed the electric power plants in Mayotte, La Réunion and Saint-Pierre-et-Miquelon. Since 2008, they have been studying a concept of a small nuclear power plant (50 to 250 MWe) named Flexblue. The project was put on hold in 2014.

Naval Group was investing in four renewable marine technologies: wave energy, marine current turbines, ocean thermal energy conversion (OTEC), and floating wind turbines. Naval created Naval Energies in 2017. Since it gained control of the Irish company OpenHydro in 2013, Naval Group has been able to progress from the research and development phase to industrial production. In 2021, Naval Group stopped the Naval Energies activities.

== Organisation ==
Naval Group is a private limited company in which the French state holds a 62.49% stake. The Thales groups holds 35% of the capital, and the remaining 2.51% is made up of company and employee shares. At the end of 2016, Naval Group employed 12,771 people, more than half of whom are private sector workers, while the other half are public sector workers. The group is present in 18 countries and has entered several partnerships outside France through its subsidiaries and joint ventures. Sites:

=== In France ===
Naval Group operates 10 sites in France. Each site is specialised in a particular activity.

- Bagneux: information and surveillance systems (site closed in 2026)
- Brest: services, operational readiness of vessels and submarines, maintenance of the Navy's industrial port infrastructures, renewable marine energies. The site is located in the Brest dockyards, on the Froutven zone and on the Île Longue. It is a stakeholder in Pôle Mer Bretagne.
- Cherbourg: production of submarines
- Toulon-Ollioules: information and surveillance systems
- Lorient: surface naval defence systems
- Nantes-Indret and Technocampus Ocean: submarines, research and development, nuclear propulsion. Co-founder of the EMC centre of excellence
- Paris: head office of the group
- Ruelle-sur-Touvre: submarines, automated systems, simulators, training
- Saint-Tropez: underwater weapons (torpedoes)
- Toulon: services, maintenance of submarines and the Charles de Gaulle aircraft carrier

=== Worldwide ===
Naval Group owns representative offices in Australia, Saudi Arabia, Brazil, Chile, the United Arab Emirates, Greece, India, Indonesia, Malaysia. The group is also represented all over the world by its subsidiaries and joint ventures, which are wholly owned or operated in association with other companies.

==== Europe-Middle East ====
- France:
  - Sirehna, a 100% owned subsidiary: naval hydrodynamics, navigation solutions for ships and landing solutions for marine, land or aerial vehicles and drones
  - Défense Environnement Services, a 49%-owned subsidiary, in partnership with Veolia Environnement: multi-service infrastructures
  - Kership, a 45%-owned partnership, with Piriou: medium-tonnage vessels for the French state
- The Netherlands:
  - Naval Group BV Den Haag, Naval Group Far East is a wholly owned subsidiary of Naval Group.
- Belgium:
  - Naval Group Belgium is a wholly owned subsidiary of Naval Group.
- Ireland:
  - OpenHydro, a 62% owned subsidiary of Naval Energies: marine current turbines
- Saudi Arabia:
  - Naval Group Support, a 100% owned subsidiary: assistance for the Naval Group group's operational readiness missions

==== Africa ====
- Egypt: Naval Group Alexandria is a wholly owned subsidiary of Naval Group.

==== Asia-Pacific ====
- Australia
  - Naval Group Australia, a 100% owned subsidiary: awarded SEA1000 contract in 2016 as DCNS Australia by the Australian Government. Responsible for the design of twelve future submarines for the Royal Australian Navy. The contract was cancelled in September 2021.
- India:
  - Naval Group India, a 100% owned subsidiary: support for technical and research activities in the local naval shipyards
- Malaysia:
  - Naval Group Malaysia, a 100% owned subsidiary: assistance for the Naval Group in its local activities
  - Boustead Naval Group Naval Company, a 40% owned subsidiary, in partnership with Boustead: operational readiness of submarines
- Singapore:
  - Naval Group Far East, a 100% owned subsidiary: logistics and maintenance for naval and air and sea systems

==== Americas ====
- Brazil:
  - Naval Group do Brasil, a 100% owned subsidiary: the group's sales office in Brazil
  - Prosin, a 100% owned subsidiary of Naval Group do Brasil: The responsibility for naval systems engineering in Brazil
  - Itaguaí Construções Navais, a 41% owned subsidiary, in partnership with Brazilian Government: construction of submarines as part of the contract signed by DCNS with the Brazilian Navy.
- Canada:
  - Naval Group Technologies Canada Inc, a 100% owned subsidiary: the group's sales office in Canada

=== Governance ===
- Chairman and CEO: Pierre Eric Pommellet
- Senior Executive Vice President, Development: Alain Guillou
- Senior Executive Vice President, Finance, Legal & Purchasing: Frank Le Rebeller

=== Financial data ===
	2012	2013	2019	2020	2021	2022
Turnover (billion €)	3.36	2.93	3.6	3.3	4.0	4.0
Firm orders (billion €)	2.53	2.27	5.3	3.4	3.0	5.6
Order book (billion €)	14.46	13.22	15.01	15.2	14.0	15.3
Operating profit (million €)	208.5	166.4	261.6	3.3	232.7	96.8
Net profit (million €)	163.7	104.1	145.2	-56.3	192.5	327.8

== Controversies ==
=== Karachi affair ===
The Karachi affair (French: affaire Karachi) was a major military scandal that took place in the second administration of Prime Minister Benazir Bhutto, involving the presidencies of François Mitterrand and Jacques Chirac in 1992–97. The scandal involved the payment of massive commissions and kickbacks between France and Pakistan over the negotiations to acquire Agosta 90B-class submarines.

=== Taiwan frigate scandal ===
The DCN / DCNS plays a major role in "one of France's biggest political and financial scandals of the last generation [that left] a trail of eight unexplained deaths, nearly half a billion dollars in missing cash and troubling allegations of government complicity" connected to a sale of warships to Taiwan in the 1990s.

Apart from the issues surrounding the sale of ships to Taiwan mentioned above, French prosecutors started investigating a wide range of corruption charges in 2010 involving different submarine sales, with possible bribery and kickbacks to top officials in France. In particular interest by the prosecutors are sales of Scorpène-class submarines to countries like India and Malaysia.

=== Malaysia ===
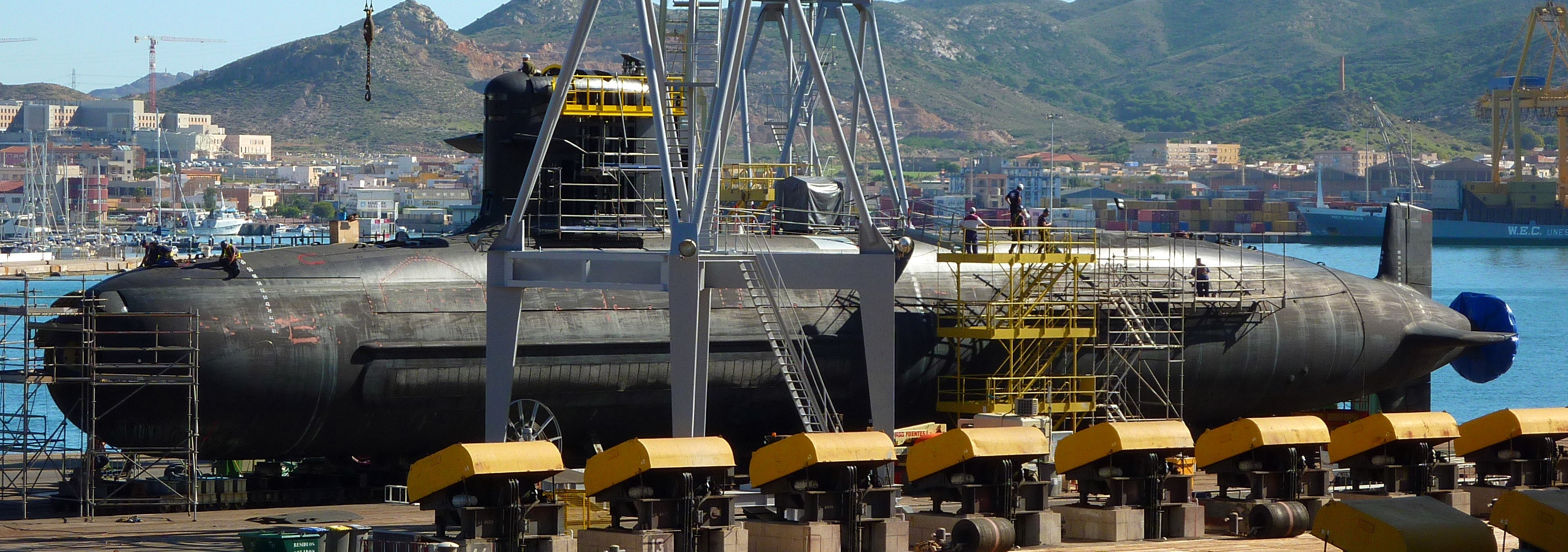
Scorpène-class submarine before delivery to Malaysia

The investigation in Malaysia has been prompted by human rights group Suaram as it involved Prime Minister Najib Razak when he was defence minister and his friend Abdul Razak Baginda whose company Primekar was alleged to be paid a huge commission during the purchase of two Scorpène submarines. French investigators are interested in the fact that Primekar was formed only a few months before the contract was signed with the Malaysian government and DCNS and that Primekar had no track record in servicing submarines and did not have the financial capability to support the contract. Investigations have also revealed that a Hong Kong-based company called Terasasi Ltd in which the directors are Razak Baginda and his father, sold classified Malaysian navy defence documents to DCNS. Also under scrutiny are allegations of extortion and the murder of Shaariibuugiin Altantuyaa, a translator who worked on the deal.

On 15 December 2015, French courts indicted Bernard Baiocco, former president of Thales International Asia for paying kickbacks to Abdul Razak Baginda. At the same time director of shipbuilder DCN International was indicted for misuse of corporate assets.

=== Indian Navy data leak ===
On 24 August 2016, it was reported by the newspaper The Australian that a 22,000-page report leak has taken place regarding the unrelated Scorpène-class submarine currently being built by India as a part of a 3.5 billion dollar deal. The suspected leak of sensitive information for the Scorpène was claimed to contain information regarding stealth, sensors, the noise level of the submarine at different sea depths, acoustic information and more. The Indian Navy passed the blame for the data leak onto unnamed overseas sources, possibly from the hacking of sensitive data. Naval Group filed a complaint against the newspaper with the Supreme Court of the State of New South Wales in Australia for having illegally published documents containing old technical information about the Scorpene. The Australian court ruled in favour of Naval Group on 29 August and confirmed its decision on 1 September.

== Communication ==
Naval Group operates several programmes to promote training and professional integration. The group has signed the Pacte PME, which fosters relations between large companies and smaller enterprises and sets up partnerships with leading universities and academic institutions. Between 2006 and 2013, DCNS organised the Trophée Poséidon for students in engineering schools, which rewarded student projects in the fields of innovation and the maritime environment.

Between 2008 and 2014, Naval Group also ran a professional integration programme for both persons with technical qualifications and persons without any qualifications, called the Filières du Talent. In 2010, this programme was rewarded by the Trophée national 2010 de l’entreprise citoyenne.

DCNS has also been involved in the world of yachting for many years by sharing its technologies and through its sponsoring and mentoring activities. The group is a partner of the Grand-Prix de l'École Navale, a regatta that has been held near the Crozon peninsula since 2001. It has also been a partner of the Pôle France Voile in Brest since 2007, and works for the professional integration of former sportsmen and sportswomen.

In 2008, DCNS built the single-hull DCNS 1000, a yacht designed for round-the-world races, which featured in the 2013 film En Solitaire, by Christophe Offenstein, starring François Cluzet.

Today, Naval Group also shared its technical expertise in composites for hulls and in navigation systems by building the experimental trimaran L'Hydroptère, and it partnered with the Areva Challenge team that took part in the America's Cup in 2007. The Naval Group industrial site in Toulon has been a partner of Toulon rugby club since 2005.
