= List of current equipment of the Chilean Army =

Equipment of the Chilean Army

This is a list of equipment of the Chilean Army currently in use. It includes firearms, indirect fire weapons, military vehicles, aircraft and watercraft.

== Aircraft ==
=== Unmanned aerial vehicles ===
Name	Image	Origin	Type	Role	Number	Details
Láscar	—	Chile	UAV fixed-wing	Intelligence, surveillance and reconnaissance	N/A	UAV developed by the Chilean Army since 2008.
SpyLite		Israel	Miniature UAV	Intelligence, surveillance and reconnaissance	N/A	An unknown number of these UAVs were acquired in 2013.
DJI Inspire 1 V2		China	UAV quadcopter	Intelligence, surveillance and reconnaissance	N/A	—
DJI Inspire 2		China	UAV quadcopter	Intelligence, surveillance and reconnaissance	2	Acquired by the Comando de Ingenieros (Cinge) of the Chilean Army.
DJI Mavic Pro		China	UAV quadcopter	Intelligence, surveillance and reconnaissance	N/A	—
DJI Mavic 2 Enterprise Advanced		China	UAV quadcopter	Intelligence, surveillance and reconnaissance	4	Units acquired for the BOE in 2021.
DJI Mavic 3		China	UAV quadcopter	Intelligence, surveillance and reconnaissance	2	A Mavic 3 Thermal and a Mavic 3 Classic were acquired for the Fuerza de Tarea "Los Ángeles" of the Chilean Army for patrol work in the Macrozona Sur.
DJI Air 3		China	UAV quadcopter	Intelligence, surveillance and reconnaissance	2	Acquired by the Escuela de Artilleria of the Chilean Army.

=== Helicopters ===
Name	Origin	Type	Number	Note	Image
Airbus Helicopters	France	military helicopter	10	6 AS532AL Cougar 2 AS532ALe Cougar 2 SA 330 Puma	
McDonnell Douglas MD 500 Defender	US	military helicopter	9	MD530 Nightfox - MD530F	

== Weapons ==
=== Pistols ===
Name	Image	Origin	Type	Cartridge	Details
FAMAE FN-750		Czech Republic / Chile	Semi-automatic pistol	9×19 mm	Pistol is a clone of the CZ 75 produced locally by FAMAE and used by the Chilean Army.
CZ P-07		Czech Republic	Semi-automatic pistol	9×19 mm	—
Taurus PT809		Brazil	Semi-automatic pistol	9×19 mm	—
Glock 17		Austria	Semi-automatic pistol	9×19 mm	—
Beretta Px4 Storm		Italy	Semi-automatic pistol	9×19 mm	Used by the Lautaro Special Operations Brigade (BOE).

=== Submachine guns ===
Name	Origin	Type	Cartridge	Image	Details
Taurus SM-12	(Brazil) BR	Submachine gun	9×19 mm		—
Heckler & Koch MP5	(Germany) DE	Submachine gun	9×19mm		Used by the BOE.
Ingram MAC-10	(United States) US	Submachine gun	9×19mm		—
FN P90	(Belgium) BE	Submachine gun	5.7×28 mm		—
SAF-FAMAE	(Chile) CL	Submachine gun	9×19mm		Submachine guns produced and manufactured by FAMAE.
Mini SAF-FAMAE	(Chile) CL	Submachine gun	9×19mm		Submachine guns produced and manufactured by FAMAE.

=== Battle / assault rifles ===
Name	Image	Origin	Type	Cartridge	Details
SIG SG 510-4 FAMAE		Switzerland / Chile	Battle rifle	7.62×51 mm	Manufactured locally by FAMAE. As of 2014 they began to be progressively replaced by the IWI Galil ACE co-produced by FAMAE.
IMI Galil		Israel	Assault rifle	5.56×45 mm	—
SIG SG 540/540-1 FAMAE		Switzerland / Chile	Assault rifle	5.56×45mm	Locally manufactured by FAMAE since 1991. As of 2014 they began to be progressively replaced by the IWI Galil ACE co-produced by FAMAE.
SIG SG 542/542-1 FAMAE		Switzerland / Chile	Battle Rifle	7.62×51mm	Locally manufactured by FAMAE since 1991. As of 2014 they began to be progressively replaced by the IWI Galil ACE co-produced by FAMAE.
SIG SG 543/543-1 FAMAE		Switzerland / Chile	Assault rifle	5.56×45mm	Manufactured locally by FAMAE.
Colt M-4 Panther		United States	Assault rifle	5.56×45mm	Used by the BOE. It is a special operations optimized rifle model (SOPMOD). As of 2021 they began to be gradually replaced by the IWI ARAD, after more than a decade of service.
SIG SG 556		Switzerland	Assault rifle	5.56×45mm	A smaller number acquired in the 2000s.
Heckler & Koch G36		Germany	Assault rifle	5.56×45mm	—
IWI Galil ACE 22 NC		Israel / Chile	Assault rifle	5.56×45mm	Standard army rifle co-produced at FAMAE from 2015.
IWI ARAD		Israel	Assault rifle	5.56×45mm	Acquired by the BOE around 2021.

=== Sniper rifles ===
Name	Origin	Type	Cartridge	Image	Details
Barrett M82A1	(United States) US	Anti-materiel sniper rifle	12.7×99 mm		Used by the BOE.
SIG Sauer SSG 3000	(Switzerland) CH	Sniper rifle	7.62×51 mm		—
PGM 338	(France) FR	Sniper rifle	8.6×70 mm		Used by the BOE.
APR 338	(Switzerland) CH	Sniper rifle	8.6×70mm		Used by the BOE.
MARS-H	(United States) US	Sniper rifle	7.62×51mm		Acquired by the BOE in 2021.

=== Machine guns ===
Name	Origin	Type	Cartridge	Image	Details
Browning M2	(United States) US	Heavy machine gun	12.7×99 mm		Machine gun used in the Chilean Army since 1943. Currently used in M109 howitzers, M113 armored personnel carriers, Mowag Piranha 6x6 and 8x8 armoured fighting vehicles, HMMWV 4x4 vehicles, among others.
MG 1/MG 3	(Germany) DE	General-purpose machine gun	7.62×51 mm		The Chilean Army was one of the first operators of the machine gun. Used as an infantry weapon, and also as a coaxial weapon on Leopard 2A4 tanks and Marder 1A3 infantry fighting vehicles.
FN MP3	(Belgium) BE	Heavy machine gun	12.7×99mm		Machine guns pods on MD-530F helicopters of the Chilean Army Aviation Brigade (BAVE).
FN MAG	(Belgium) BE	General-purpose machine gun	7.62×51mm		Used as a coaxial weapon on Leopard 1V tanks.
FN M3M (GAU-21)	(Belgium) BE / (United States) US	Heavy machine gun	12.7×99mm		Machine guns mounted on helicopters AS532 Cougar of the BAVE.
FN MAG 58M (FN LPH)	(Belgium) BE	General-purpose machine gun	7.62×51mm		Machine guns mounted on helicopters AS532 Cougar of the BAVE.
FN Minimi	(Belgium) BE	Light machine gun	5.56×45 mm 7.62×51mm		The procurement process for this machine gun began in the 2010s. It can be mounted on HMMWV 4x4 vehicles.
M249	(Belgium) BE / (United States) US	Light machine gun	5.56×45mm		—

=== Shotguns ===
Name	Origin	Type	Cartridge	Image	Details
Meriva Standard Pump	(Philippines) PH	Riot shotgun	12 bore		Acquired by the Chilean Army Logistics Division in 2020.
Armsel Striker	(South Africa) SA	Combat shotgun	12 bore		Used by the BOE.

=== Grenade launchers ===
Name	Origin	Type	Cartridge	Image	Details
Mk 19	(United States) US	Automatic grenade launcher	40×53 mm		Mounted on HMMWV 4x4 vehicles, M113 armored personnel carriers and Mowag Piranha 6x6 and 8x8 armoured fighting vehicles.
Milkor MGL	(South Africa) SA	Revolver grenade launcher	40×51 mm		—
M203	(United States) US	Coupled grenade launcher	40×46 mm		—
IWI GL 40	(Israel) IL	Coupled grenade launcher	40×46 mm		It is used in Galil ACE 22 NC and IWI Arad rifles.
CIS 40 AGL MK-10	(Singapore) SG	Automatic grenade launcher	40x53 mm		Automatic grenade launchers acquired in 2014.

== Indirect fire weapons ==
=== Anti-material weapons ===
Name	Origin	Type	Cartridge	Image	Details
M40A1	(United States) US / (Spain) ES	Recoilless rifle	106 mm		There are a significant number of M40A1s built in the 1970s by the company Santa Bárbara Sistemas, and modernized over a decade ago. They are used from M249 Storm 4X4 vehicles. 213 M40A1s as of 2016.
Carl Gustaf M3	(Sweden) SE	Man-portable recoilless rifle	84 mm		Version in service more than 10 years ago.
M72 LAW	(United States) US	Rocket-propelled grenade	66 mm		—
AT4	(Sweden) SE	Disposable anti-tank launcher	84 mm		—
Spike LR Spike ER	(Israel) IL	Anti-tank guided missile	130 mm 170 mm		The Spike LR was acquired in 2006 and in 2014 began receiving the ER version. They are used from portable launchers and also from mounts on AIFV armoured vehicles and HMMWV 4x4 vehicles. Total 2,200 Spike MR, Spike LR and Spike ER missiles.

=== Self-propelled artillery ===
Name	Image	Cartridge	Type	Origin	Numbers	Details
M109A3 CL M109A5 CL		155 mm/39 caliber	Self-propelled artillery	(United States) US	48	The army has 48 units, of which 24 are M109A3s purchased second-hand in Switzerland in 2004 and another 24 used units are M109A5s acquired in the United States; 12 between 2013 and 2014, and the other 12 in 2015. Units purchased from the United States were upgraded prior to delivery and received upgrades such as the M284 cannon and its M182 mounting. The M109 has the M2 Browning machine gun as a secondary weapon.

=== Air defense systems ===
Name	Origin	Type	Image	Details
Mistral 1	(France) FR	Short range air defense		Air defense system acquired in 1997. They are mounted on Mercedes-Benz Unimog 1300 4x4 trucks and use EL/M-2106 NG tactical radars from Elta Systems.

=== Rocket artillery ===
Name	Image	Cartridge	Type	Origin	Numbers	Details
LAR-160		160 mm	Multiple rocket launcher	(Israel) I	8	Acquired in the mid-1990s. They are mounted on Mercedes-Benz MB 2653 6x6 trucks and are armed with the 35 km Mark IV rocket, which is manufactured by FAMAE.
SLM MLRS		70 mm 122 mm 160 mm 306 mm	Multiple rocket launcher	(Chile) CL	prototype	Fire Command and Control System (SMCF Nekulpan) developed in Chile Tested with EXTRA rockets

=== Howitzers ===
Name	Image	Cartridge	Type	Origin	Numbers	Details
M101		105 mm/33 caliber	Towed howitzer	(United States) US	136	The NA M101/33 towed howitzer is the institution's oldest serving artillery model, purchased from the United States after World War II. The army acquired 190 of these howitzers, of which 136 were modernized in the late 1990s, changing from a 22-caliber barrel to a 33-caliber one for greater range. They can use trucks like the Mercedes-Benz Unimog 4x4 to tow them.
OTO Melara M-56/14 P		105 mm/14 caliber	Mountain howitzer	(Italy) IT	< 53	59 M-56/14 P mountain howitzers acquired in 1963.
Soltam M-71		155 mm/39 caliber	Towed howitzer	(Israel) IL	< 60	36 Soltam M-68s purchased in the 1970s and later upgraded to Soltam M-71 standard and 24 Soltam M-71 howitzers purchased in the 1980s. They use MAN 22-361 and Mercedes-Benz AK 2632 artillery tractor trucks, both 6x6.

=== Mortars ===
Name	Origin	Type	Cartridge	Image	Details
—	—	Light mortar	60 mm		The BOE uses a commando-type mortar of this caliber.
M29	(United States) US	Medium-weight mortar	81 mm		—
—	(Israel) IL	Medium-weight mortar	81 mm		The army uses mortars of this caliber from Soltam Systems and FAMAE.
—	(Chile) CL	Medium-weight mortar	81 mm		The army uses mortars of this caliber from Soltam Systems and FAMAE.
Soltam M-65	(Israel) IL	Heavy mortar	120 mm		Mortars acquired in the late 1970s. Can be towed by military vehicles such as the Mercedes-Benz Unimog U1300 4x4 truck.
—	(Chile) CL	Heavy mortar	120 mm		Used as a mortar carrier on Mowag FAMAE Piranha 6x6 armoured fighting vehicles.
Elbit TT6	(Israel) IL	Heavy mortar	120 mm		Used on M106A2 mortar carriers.
Cardom	(Israel) IL	Recoil mortar system	—		—

== Vehicles ==
=== Tanks ===
Name	Image	Caliber	Type	Origin	Quantity	Details
Leopard 1V		105 mm	Main battle tank	(Germany) DE	< 200	In 1997, 200 second-hand tanks belonging to the Royal Netherlands Army were purchased. They arrived in Chile between 1999 and 2000. In 2008, they began to be replaced by Leopard 2A4 tanks in the north of the country. Currently, there are only units in service in southern Chile. As main weapon it uses the L7A3 rifled gun, and as secondary weapons he mounts two FN MAG machine guns; having one of the machine guns anti-aircraft function.
Leopard 2A4CHL		120 mm	Main battle tank	(Germany) DE	186	In 2006, 140 second-hand tanks were purchased in Germany, with more units later. It is estimated a total of 186 tanks purchased by the army, which were destined for northern Chile. As main weapon it uses the L/44 smoothbore gun, and as secondary weapons it mounts two MG 3 machine guns; having one of the machine guns anti-aircraft function.

=== Armoured infantry vehicles ===
Name	Image	Type	Origin	Quantity	Details
M113A1 M113A2		Armoured personnel carrier / utility	(United States) US / (Chile) CL	≃ 408	60 M113A1s purchased in the 1970s. 128 second-hand M113A2s purchased in Italy in 1996. This was followed by a batch of 14 M113A2 Plus with dozer blades, minesweepers and polymer tube slingshot launchers with a recovery crane for engineers. 158 second-hand M113A2s purchased in the United States in 2003. The army has other versions of the M113. It has an anti-armor version, M106A2 mortar carrier and M577 command units. There are 48 M548 ammunition vehicles purchased from Canada, plus units from the United States and Italy. FAMAE converted 22 German M113s into ambulances and 8 M548s into fuel tankers. The M113s are armed with Browning M2 machine guns and Mk 19 grenade launchers. The anti-armor version is armed with the KBA-B cannon and the M106A2 with the Elbit TT6 mortar.
M108 VBCL		Armoured utility carrier	(United States) US	21	They are units that serve for command and control. (Former Belgian Army)
Mowag Piranha		Armoured fighting vehicle / utility	(Switzerland) CH / (Chile) CL	≃ 177	Some 200 6x6 units were built under license by Cardoen Industries and FAMAE in the 1980s. The army originally received the version armoured combat vehicle for troop transport (VTP), 120 mm mortar carrier vehicle, anti-aircraft vehicle with turreted Ramta TCM-20 and Elta/M 2106 anti-aircraft defense radar vehicle. (Note: The vehicles with turreted Ramta TCM-20 were converted to command, telecommunications and VTP vehicles, with the turrets being withdrawn from service.) Later, some units were transformed by FAMAE into ambulances, command post vehicles, armored anti-armor vehicles and minesweepers. Also, 22 8x8 units that were built under license by FAMAE in the 1990s. The Mowag 6x6 and 8x8 are armed with Browning M2 machine guns and Mk 19 grenade launchers. The anti-armor version is armed with the KBA-B cannon. The army has ceded 45 units to the Carabineros de Chile between 2018 and 2022.
M1151A1 HMMWV M1165 HMMWV		Armoured tactical vehicle	(United States) US	565 (includes M1097A2 variant)	The BOE uses the M1165 HMMWV 4x4 vehicle. They have a central mount for a Browning M2 HB machine gun or a Mk 19 grenade launcher, and also have a side mount in the passenger position and in the cargo area for an FN Minimi machine gun.
AIFV-B YPR-765		Infantry fighting vehicle / utility	(United States) US	169	139 AIFV-B vehicles belonging to the Belgian Army acquired in 2006. There is the personnel transport version with 12.7×99 mm machine guns, the version with tower and KBA-B02 cannon, the command version, the telecommunications version and the version with dozer blade. Some personnel carriers integrated the Spike LR missile. Later, YPR-765s were purchased in the Netherlands. It is estimated that the army has a total of 169 units between AIFV-B and YPR-765.
Marder 1A3		Infantry fighting vehicle	(Germany) DE	180 to 270	146 second-hand units purchased in Germany in 2008. Further purchases were made later, and the estimated total number reached 270 units. Through the Centurion project, 180 units were enabled. As its main weapon it has a Mk 20 Rh-202 cannon, and as a secondary weapon an MG 3 coaxial machine gun.

=== Light utility vehicles ===
Name	Image	Type	Origin	Quantity	Details
Toyota FJ45		Sport utility vehicle	(Japan) JP	N/A	4x4 vehicles that by 2020 are few in service and are used as telecommunications vehicles.
M240 Storm I		Off-road utility vehicle	(Israel) IL	N/A	These 4x4 vehicles are also used to mount the M40A1 recoilless rifles.
Land Rover Defender 90 / 110 / 130		Off-road utility vehicle	(United Kingdom) UK / (Chile) CL	N/A	These 4x4 vehicles use Spanish Arpa trailers.
Land Rover Defender Toqui A-2		Off-road utility vehicle	(United Kingdom) UK / (Chile) CL	N/A	These 4x4 vehicles were built in Chile for long-range reconnaissance missions.
Honda XR250 Tornado		Off-road motorcycle	(Japan) JP	N/A	—
M1097A2 HMMWV		Light utility vehicle	(United States) US	N/A	At the end of 2005 the first 4x4 vehicles of this variant were received. There are them for exploration and reconnaissance missions, transport of troops, command and communications, among others. There is also a Spike ER missile launcher version.
Honda CB250 Twister		Road-going motorcycles	(Japan) JP	3	3 motorcycles acquired in 2019 for the Intelligence Regiment No. 1 Soberanía.
Can-Am Outlander		Off-road quad bike	(Canada) CA	N/A	Off-road quad bike 4x4 used by the BOE.

=== Support trucks ===
Name	Image	Type	Origin	Quantity	Details
Mack Granite		Heavy duty truck	(United States) US	6	6 6x4 trucks donated by the United States government in 2018; 4 are dump trucks and 2 tankers.
Nissan NP300 Navara		Light pickup truck	(Japan) JP	N/A	4x4 pickup trucks purchased in 2021 and used for utility functions.
Chevrolet Colorado LT MT 4WD		Light pickup truck	(United States) US	12	12 4x4 pickup trucks purchased in 2022 by the Logistics Division of the Chilean Army.
International LT625		tractor truck	(United States) US	2	2 6x4 traction trucks acquired in 2023 by the Logistics Division of the Chilean Army for cargo transportation.

=== Engineering vehicles ===
Name	Image	Type	Origin	Quantity	Details
Mowag Piranha		Minesweeper armoured vehicle	(Switzerland) CH / (Chile) CL	N/A	6x6 units converted by FAMAE for Pearson Engineering plow minesweeper functions.
M113A2 Plus		Utility armoured vehicle	(United States) US	14	14 M113 with dozer blades, minesweepers and polymer tube slingshot launchers with a recovery crane for engineers.
BrPz Biber AVLB		Armoured vehicle-launched bridge	(Germany) DE / (Chile) CL	3	These are modified versions of the Leopard 1 tank for engineering work. In 2001, the army acquired 3 BrPz Biber AVLBs, 3 PIPZ-1 AEVs, 2 tanks for detonating mines with the Pearson Engineering system, and 3 vehicles converted to transport bridge sections. In 2017, the army received a class 70 folding steel bridge prototype developed by FAMAE and Dictuc, similar to the aluminum bridge on the BrPz Biber AVLB, but expanding its transit capacity for larger-tonnage vehicles.
PIPZ-1 AEV		Armoured recovery vehicle	(Germany) DE	3	These are modified versions of the Leopard 1 tank for engineering work. In 2001, the army acquired 3 BrPz Biber AVLBs, 3 PIPZ-1 AEVs, 2 tanks for detonating mines with the Pearson Engineering system, and 3 vehicles converted to transport bridge sections. In 2017, the army received a class 70 folding steel bridge prototype developed by FAMAE and Dictuc, similar to the aluminum bridge on the BrPz Biber AVLB, but expanding its transit capacity for larger-tonnage vehicles.
—		Minesweeper armoured vehicle	(Germany) DE	2	These are modified versions of the Leopard 1 tank for engineering work. In 2001, the army acquired 3 BrPz Biber AVLBs, 3 PIPZ-1 AEVs, 2 tanks for detonating mines with the Pearson Engineering system, and 3 vehicles converted to transport bridge sections. In 2017, the army received a class 70 folding steel bridge prototype developed by FAMAE and Dictuc, similar to the aluminum bridge on the BrPz Biber AVLB, but expanding its transit capacity for larger-tonnage vehicles.
—		Armoured vehicle transports bridge sections	(Germany) DE	3	These are modified versions of the Leopard 1 tank for engineering work. In 2001, the army acquired 3 BrPz Biber AVLBs, 3 PIPZ-1 AEVs, 2 tanks for detonating mines with the Pearson Engineering system, and 3 vehicles converted to transport bridge sections. In 2017, the army received a class 70 folding steel bridge prototype developed by FAMAE and Dictuc, similar to the aluminum bridge on the BrPz Biber AVLB, but expanding its transit capacity for larger-tonnage vehicles.
Bergepanzer 2000 (BPZ 2000) Bergepanzer 2000 WISENT (BPZ 2000-W)		Armoured recovery vehicle	(Germany) DE	35	These are modified versions of the Leopard 1 tank for engineering work. They were acquired by the army in the early 2000s.
Leguan		Armoured vehicle-launched bridge	(Germany) DE	N/A	These are modified versions of the Leopard 1 tank for engineering work. They were acquired by the army in the early 2000s.
Pionierpanzer 2 Dachs		Armoured recovery vehicle	(Germany) DE	N/A	These are modified versions of the Leopard 1 tank for engineering work. They were acquired by the army in the early 2000s.
Viablft		Armoured breaching vehicle and tube fascine launcher	(Germany) DE / (Chile) CL	7	Vehículo de Ingenieros Abridor de Brechas y Lanzafajinas de Tubos (Viablft) developed by FAMAE that is mounted on a Leopard 1 chassis. The first 2 units were delivered to the army in 2004, and in 2015 the delivery of 5 more units was completed.
VIPP		Armoured vehicle transports bridge sections	(Germany) DE / (Chile) CL	N/A	Vehículo de Ingenieros Porta Puente (VIPP) developed by FAMAE that complements the BrPz Biber AVLB bridge-launching armoured vehicle, transporting sections of bridge that are transferred to the latter.
AIFV-B		Utility armoured vehicle	(United States) US	N/A	They are units that use dozer blades.
MW 370		Mine clearing vehicle	(Germany) DE / (United Kingdom) UK	2	In 2008, 2 MW 370 were acquired from MineWolf Systems (now part of Pearson Engineering) and 3 Bozena 5 from Way Industry.
Bozena 5		Mine clearing vehicle	(Slovakia) SK	3	In 2008, 2 MW 370 were acquired from MineWolf Systems (now part of Pearson Engineering) and 3 Bozena 5 from Way Industry.
Sifting Excavator		Mine clearing excavator	(United States) US	1	The army operates 1 Sifting Excavator unit and 1 Demining Loader unit.
Demining Loader		Mine clearing loader	(United States) US	1	The army operates 1 Sifting Excavator unit and 1 Demining Loader unit.
HAMM 3410		Road roller	(Germany) DE	1	1 unit donated by the United States government in 2018.

== Watercraft ==
Name	Image	Origin	Type	Number	Details
Zodiac		France	Inflatable boat	N/A	—
Pumar		Chile	Inflatable boat	N/A	The army has acquired various models of Pumar boats produced by ASMAR shipyards over the years.
Lancha de Transporte de Pasajeros (LTP)		Chile	Passenger transport boat	1	Boat Capitán IHL ordered to be built by the army in ASMAR, Talcahuano in 2015. Incorporated into the army in 2016 and destined for O'Higgins Lake for troop transport functions.
—	—	Chile	Transport barge	1	Barge Aunashaka built by Sociedad Astilleros Tenglo Ltda., Puerto Montt in 2018 and intended for transport functions in the Beagle Channel.

== See also ==
- List of current equipment of the Chilean Air Force
- List of current equipment of the Chilean Navy
- List of active ships of the Chilean Navy
- List of active Chile military aircraft
