= List of current equipment of the Chilean Navy =

This is a list of equipment used by the Chilean Navy, the branch of the Chilean Armed Forces that specializes in naval warfare.

== Infantry equipment ==
=== Handguns ===
Name	Origin	Type	Cartridge	Image	Details
Colt .45 caliber	(United States) US	Semi-automatic pistol	11.43×23 mm/.45 ACP		Used by personnel who perform functions as members of security units.
IWI Jericho 941	(Israel) IL	Semi-automatic pistol	9×19 mm		The Chilean Marine Corps has the IWI Jericho 941 RPSL. Used by the Expeditionary Amphibious Brigade (BAE) and the Marine Infantry Commandos.

=== Battle / assault rifles ===
Name	Origin	Type	Cartridge	Image	Details
Heckler & Koch HK33A2	(Germany) DE	Assault rifle	5.56×45 mm		Rifles used since the late 60s, renovated and recovered over time. It is currently used by support, facility security, service and reserve units of the Chilean Marine Corps.
Heckler & Koch HK33SG1	(Germany) DE	Assault rifle	5.56×45 mm		—
Colt M4A1	(United States) US	Assault rifle	5.56×45 mm		Used by the Marine Infantry Commandos. It is a special operations optimized rifle model (SOPMOD).
FN SCAR-L	(Belgium) BE	Assault rifle	5.56×45 mm		The SCAR-L replaced the Heckler & Koch HK33A2 as the standard light weapon for riflemen in the Chilean Marine Corps, and the SCAR-H replaced the Heckler & Koch HK33SG1 as the weapon used by select marksmen of the naval squadron. The SCAR-L, incorporated from 2014, corresponds to the standard 14" and long 18" barrel version, and has accessories such as Elcan Specter optical sights and Eotech red dot sights, FN40GL-L 40 mm grenade launcher and sound suppressors.
FN SCAR-H	(Belgium) BE	Battle rifle	7.62×51 mm		The SCAR-L replaced the Heckler & Koch HK33A2 as the standard light weapon for riflemen in the Chilean Marine Corps, and the SCAR-H replaced the Heckler & Koch HK33SG1 as the weapon used by select marksmen of the naval squadron. The SCAR-L, incorporated from 2014, corresponds to the standard 14" and long 18" barrel version, and has accessories such as Elcan Specter optical sights and Eotech red dot sights, FN40GL-L 40 mm grenade launcher and sound suppressors.

=== Sniper rifles ===
Name	Origin	Type	Cartridge	Image	Details
Barrett M82A1	(United States) US	Anti-materiel sniper rifle	12.7×99 mm		Barrett M82A1 is used by the BAE and Marine Infantry Commandos, while the Barrett Model 98B is used by the BAE only. Both weapons mount the Schmidt & Bender 5-25x56 PM II LP optical sight.
Barrett Model 98B	(United States) US	Sniper rifle	8.6×70mm/.338 Lapua Magnum		Barrett M82A1 is used by the BAE and Marine Infantry Commandos, while the Barrett Model 98B is used by the BAE only. Both weapons mount the Schmidt & Bender 5-25x56 PM II LP optical sight.

=== Submachine guns ===
Name	Origin	Type	Cartridge	Image	Details
Heckler & Koch MP5	(Germany) DE	Submachine gun	9×19 mm		It is used by the Marine Infantry Commandos.

=== Machine guns ===
Name	Origin	Type	Cartridge	Image	Details
L43A1	(United Kingdom) UK	General-purpose machine gun	7.62×51 mm		British version of the FN MAG mounted on the FV101 Scorpion light tank of reconnaissance as a secondary weapon.
Browning M2 HB	(United States) US	Heavy machine gun	12.7×99 mm		Mounted on HMMWV 4x4 armoured tactical vehicles.
Heckler & Koch MG4	(Germany) DE	Light machine gun	5.56×45 mm		Machine guns acquired in 2014 to replace the Ultimax 100 MK 3 and MG3, respectively. MG4 used by BAE and Marine Infantry Commandos, while MG5 is used by BAE only.
Heckler & Koch MG5	(Germany) DE	General-purpose machine gun	7.62×51 mm		Machine guns acquired in 2014 to replace the Ultimax 100 MK 3 and MG3, respectively. MG4 used by BAE and Marine Infantry Commandos, while MG5 is used by BAE only.
FN MAG	(Belgium) BE	General-purpose machine gun	7.62×51 mm		Secondary weapon of the LAV III (NZLAV) 8x8 light armoured vehicles.

=== Grenade launchers ===
Name	Origin	Type	Cartridge	Image	Details
Mk 19	(United States) US	Automatic grenade launcher	40 mm		Mounted on HMMWV 4x4 armoured tactical vehicles.
FN40GL-L	(Belgium) BE	Coupled grenade launcher	40 mm		Accessory for the FN SCAR-L.

=== Anti-armor weapons ===
Name	Origin	Type	Cartridge	Image	Details
M72 LAW	(United States) US	Rocket-propelled grenade	66 mm		In 2018, a new variant of this weapon was reported to be in service.
AT4	(Sweden) SE	Anti-tank weapon	84 mm		—

== Indirect fire weapons ==
=== Mortars ===
Name	Origin	Type	Cartridge	Image	Details
M60	(Austria) AT	Light mortar	60 mm		In 2015, the mortars of 60 mm and 81 mm from the Austrian company Hirtenberger Defense Systems were incorporated. Used by the BAE to provide fire support to the sections and companies of the Marine Corps.
M81	(Austria) AT	Medium-weight mortar	81 mm		In 2015, the mortars of 60 mm and 81 mm from the Austrian company Hirtenberger Defense Systems were incorporated. Used by the BAE to provide fire support to the sections and companies of the Marine Corps.

=== Howitzers ===
Name	Origin	Type	Cartridge	Image	Details
KH-178	(South Korea) KOR	Towed howitzer	105 mm		16 howitzers that were acquired in 1991. Used by the Combat Support Battalion No. 41 Hurtado of the BAE.
G-4	(Israel) IL	Towed howitzer	155 mm		24 howitzers that were acquired second-hand from South Africa in 1992. Used for coastal defense by Marine Infantry Detachments No. 1 Lynch and No. 4 Cochrane. Mercedes-Benz Zetros MB 1833 4x4 trucks are used to tow them.

=== Anti-ship weapons ===
Name	Origin	Type	Image	Details
Excalibur	(United Kingdom) UK	Anti-ship missile		A coastal defense version that was developed in the United Kingdom and deployed to Gibraltar from 1985 to 1997. It uses Exocet MM-38 ground-launched missiles. In 1993 steps were taken that concluded with the acquisition of a battery for the Chilean Marine Corps. In 2019, it is still reported to be in service with Marine Infantry Detachment No. 1 Lynch for coastal defense roles.

== Vehicles ==
=== Armoured vehicles ===
Name	Origin	Type	Image	Details
BV-206D (VT-206) / M-973	(Sweden) SE / (Chile) CL	Tracked articulated vehicle		The first vehicles arrived in 1988. Some of these vehicles were assembled by Cardoen Industries.
FV101 Scorpion	(United Kingdom) UK	Light tank of reconnaissance		In 1993 steps were taken in the United Kingdom that concluded with the acquisition of 12 second-hand units. In 2008, these units were replaced by 15 second-hand units from Spain. These latter units are modified and have a 200 hp Perkins T6/3544 six-cylinder diesel engine and optronic systems consisting of a laser rangefinder, night vision devices and an electronic calculator.
M1151/M1152 HMMWV	(United States) US	Armoured tactical vehicle		4x4 vehicles acquired after the acquisition of the M998 HMMWV in 2006. Armed with Mk 19 grenade launcher and Browning M2 HB machine gun. These vehicles partly replaced the PVPs that had been acquired in 2009 and then gradually transferred to Carabineros de Chile.
LAV III (NZLAV)	(Canada) CA	Light armoured vehicle		22 second-hand 8x8 units purchased in New Zealand in April 2022. They will be delivered in two batches, one in 2022 and one in 2023. Vehicles armed with a M242 Bushmaster cannon as primary weapon and two FN MAG machine guns as secondary weapons.
Kia KLTV181/182	(South Korea) KOR	Armoured tactical vehicle		4x4 vehicles of the troop transport version acquired in December 2022.

=== Utility vehicles ===
Name	Origin	Type	Image	Details
Kia KM 420	(South Korea) KOR	Light utility vehicle		4x4 vehicles acquired in the early 2000s.
M998 HMMWV	(United States) US	Light utility vehicle		4x4 transport version vehicles acquired second-hand in 2006.
Polaris Sportsman 500	(United States) US	All-terrain vehicle		6x6 ATVs purchased over a decade ago.
Honda XR250	(Japan) JP	Off-road motorcycle		—

=== Shelter vehicles ===
Name	Origin	Type	Image	Details
—	—	Shelter vehicle		In 2020, the purchase of a shelter vehicle was tendered to replace the one operated by the Marine Infantry Detachment No. 1 Lynch. But it was canceled due to the contingency of the COVID-19 pandemic.

=== Support trucks ===
Name	Origin	Type	Image	Details
M-35 A2	(United States) US	Cargo truck		6x6 trucks acquired in the 1990s. Most replaced by Kia KM 250 and KM 500 trucks.
Kia KM 250	(South Korea) KOR	Cargo truck		6x6 multi-purpose military trucks acquired in the 2000s.
Kia KM 450	(South Korea) KOR	Light cargo truck		4x4 multi-purpose military trucks acquired in the 2000s.
Kia KM 500	(South Korea) KOR	Cargo truck		6x6 multi-purpose military trucks acquired in the 2000s.
Kia KM 255	(South Korea) KOR	Fuel tanker truck		6x6 trucks used as fuel tanker.
Kia KM 451	(South Korea) KOR	Ambulance pickup truck		4x4 trucks used as ambulances.
Kia KM 502	(South Korea) KOR	Wrecker truck		6x6 trucks used as wrecker.
Mercedes-Benz Zetros MB 1833	(Germany) DE	Cargo truck		4x4 trucks acquired in 2014 and used to tow the G-4 howitzers.
International DT 4600	(United States) US	—		It is 4x4 trucks.

== Aircraft ==
=== Unmanned aerial vehicles ===
Name	Image	Origin	Type	Role	Number	Details
Skua	—	Chile	Miniature UAV	—	N/A	Developed by Seawind SA Ltda. in 2010 and acquired in 2012 by the Chilean Marine Corps. It is the first reconnaissance UAV fully incorporated into a Chilean military force.
Chercán	—	Chile	Compact quadcopter	—	N/A	Developed by SISDEF and deployed in 2015 by the Chilean Marine Corps in MINUSTAH.
Mavic Pro		China	Compact quadcopter	—	—	4 units acquired between 2018 and 2019.
Mavic 2 Enterprise Dual		China	Compact quadcopter	—	—	3 units acquired in 2020.

== See also ==
- List of current equipment of the Chilean Air Force
- List of current equipment of the Chilean Army
- List of active ships of the Chilean Navy
- List of active Chile military aircraft
