= List of active Chile military aircraft =

List of active Chile military aircraft is a list of military aircraft currently in service with the Chilean Armed Forces.

== Chilean Air Force ==
USAF F-35 in Chile

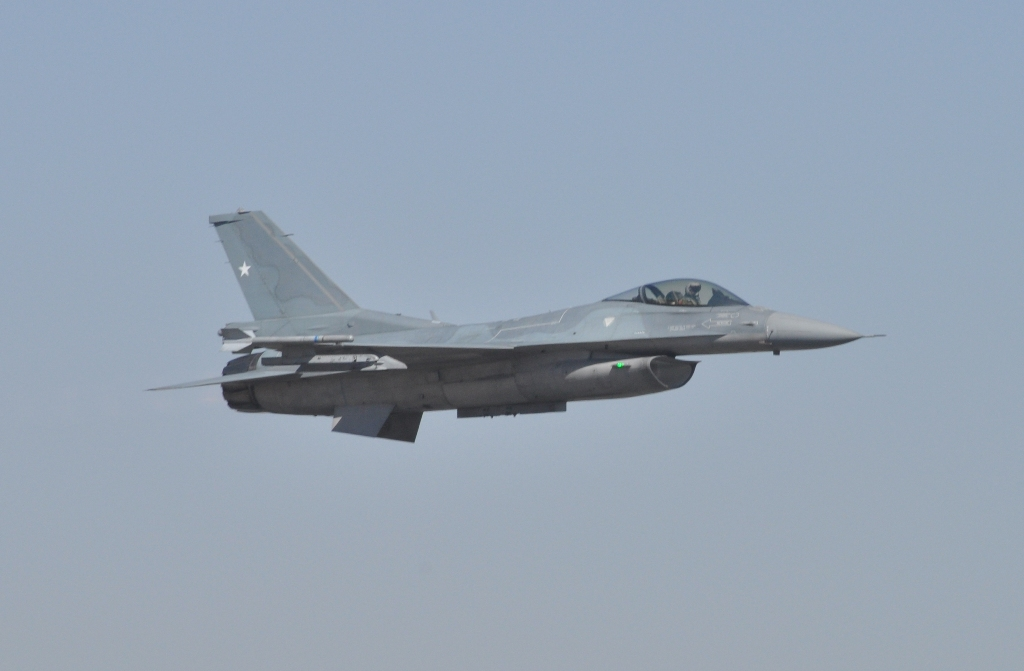
F-16C Block 50

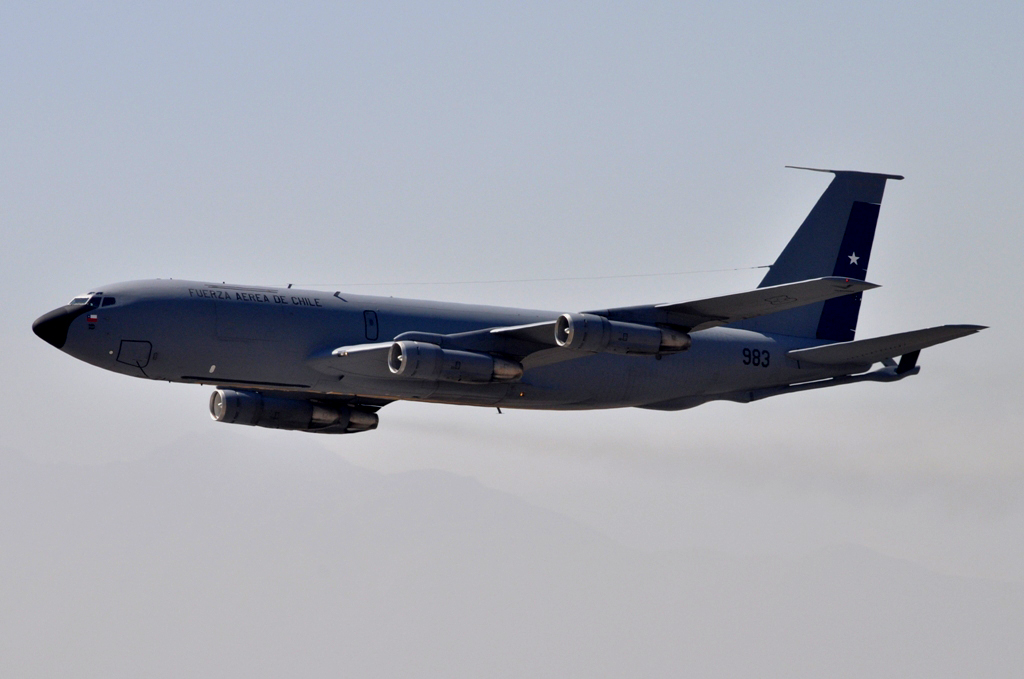
KC-135E Stratotanker

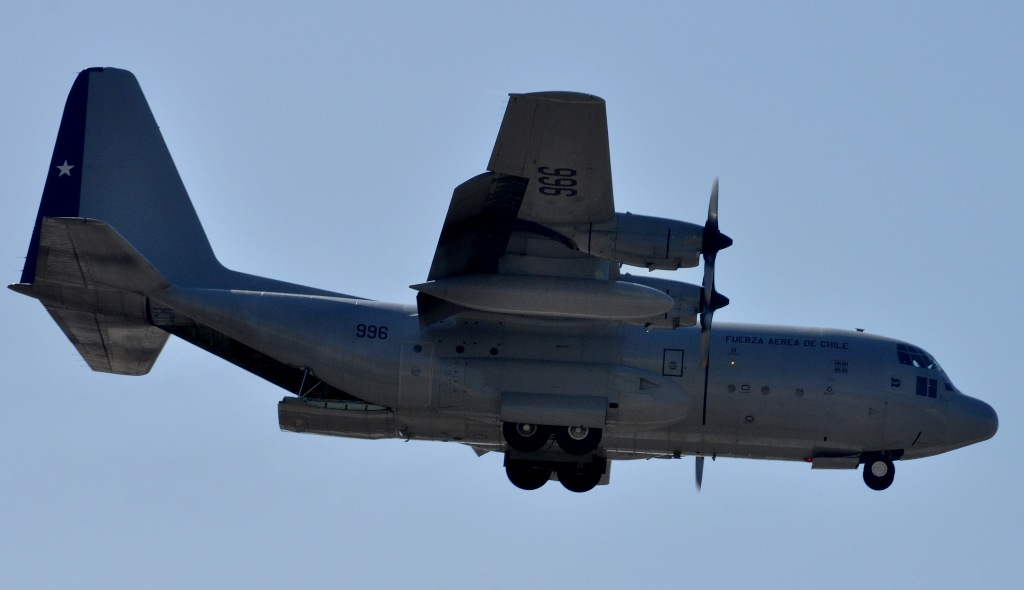
C-130H Hercules

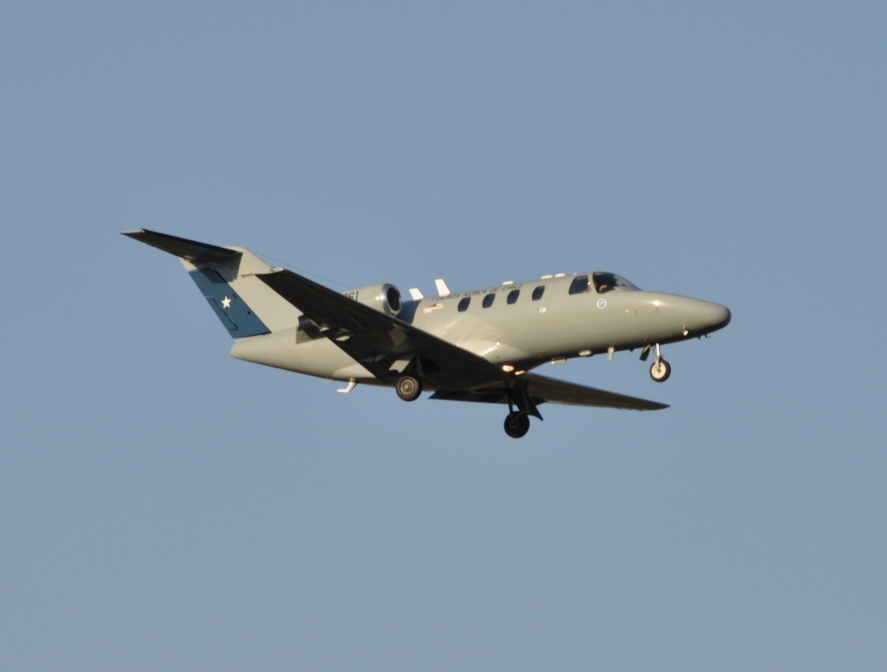
Cessna CitationJet CJ1

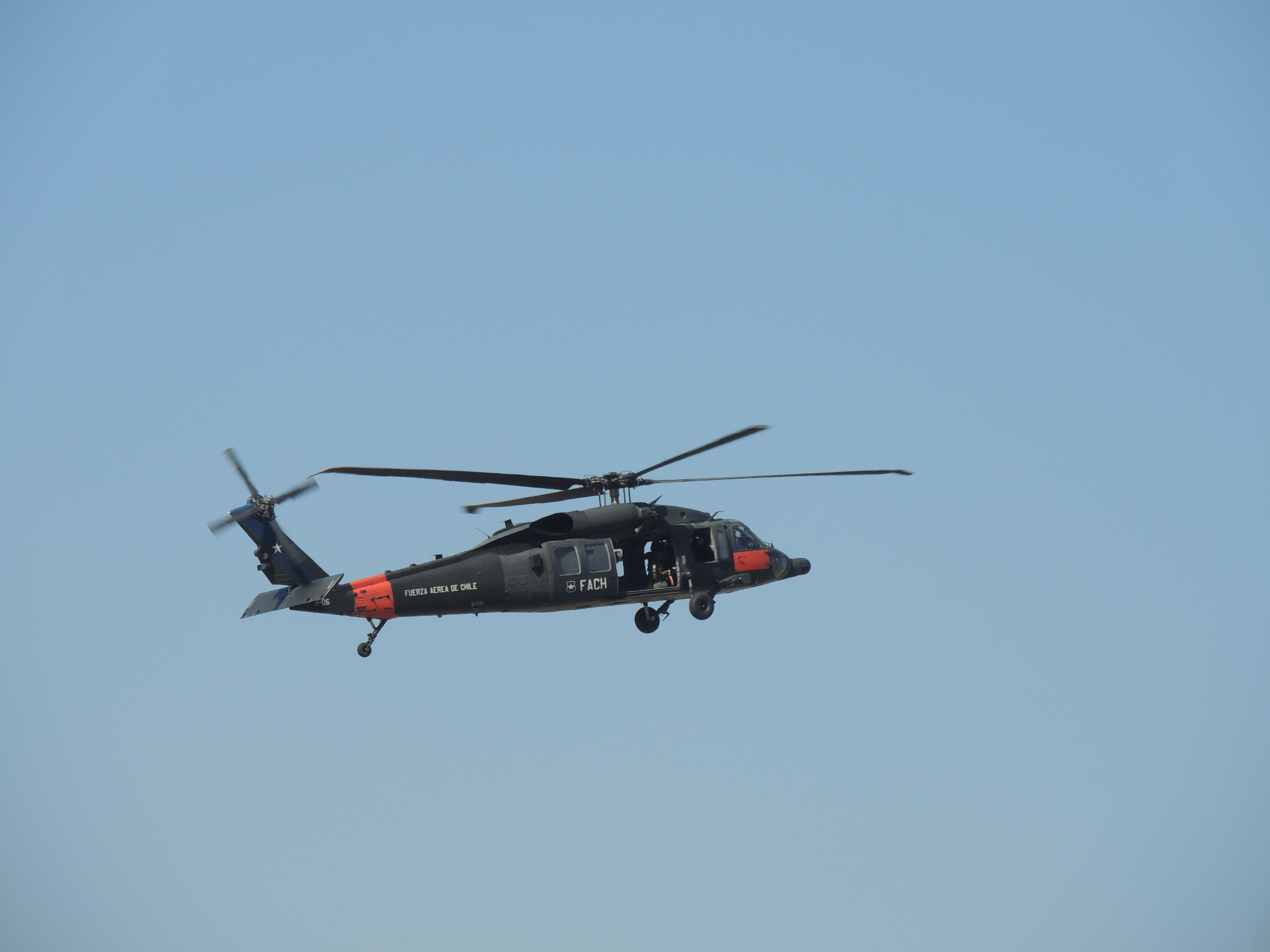
Sikorsky S-70i Black Hawk

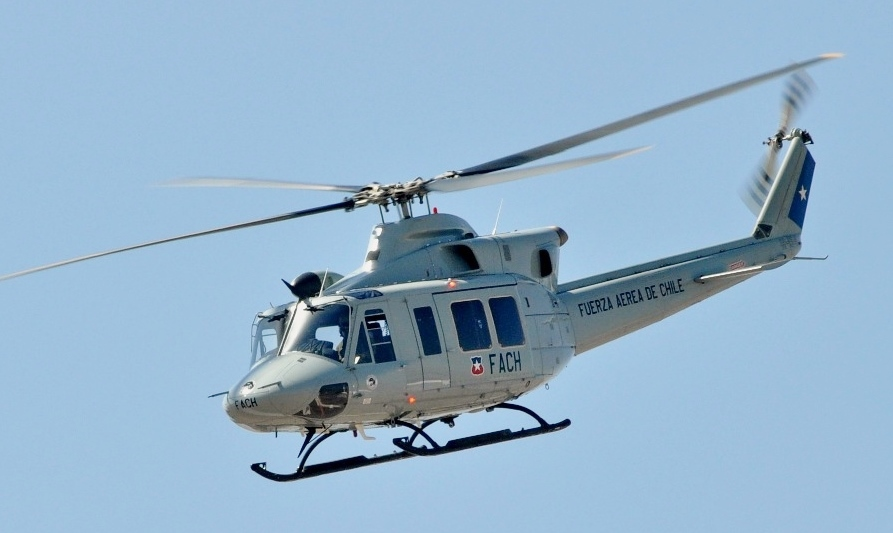
Bell 412

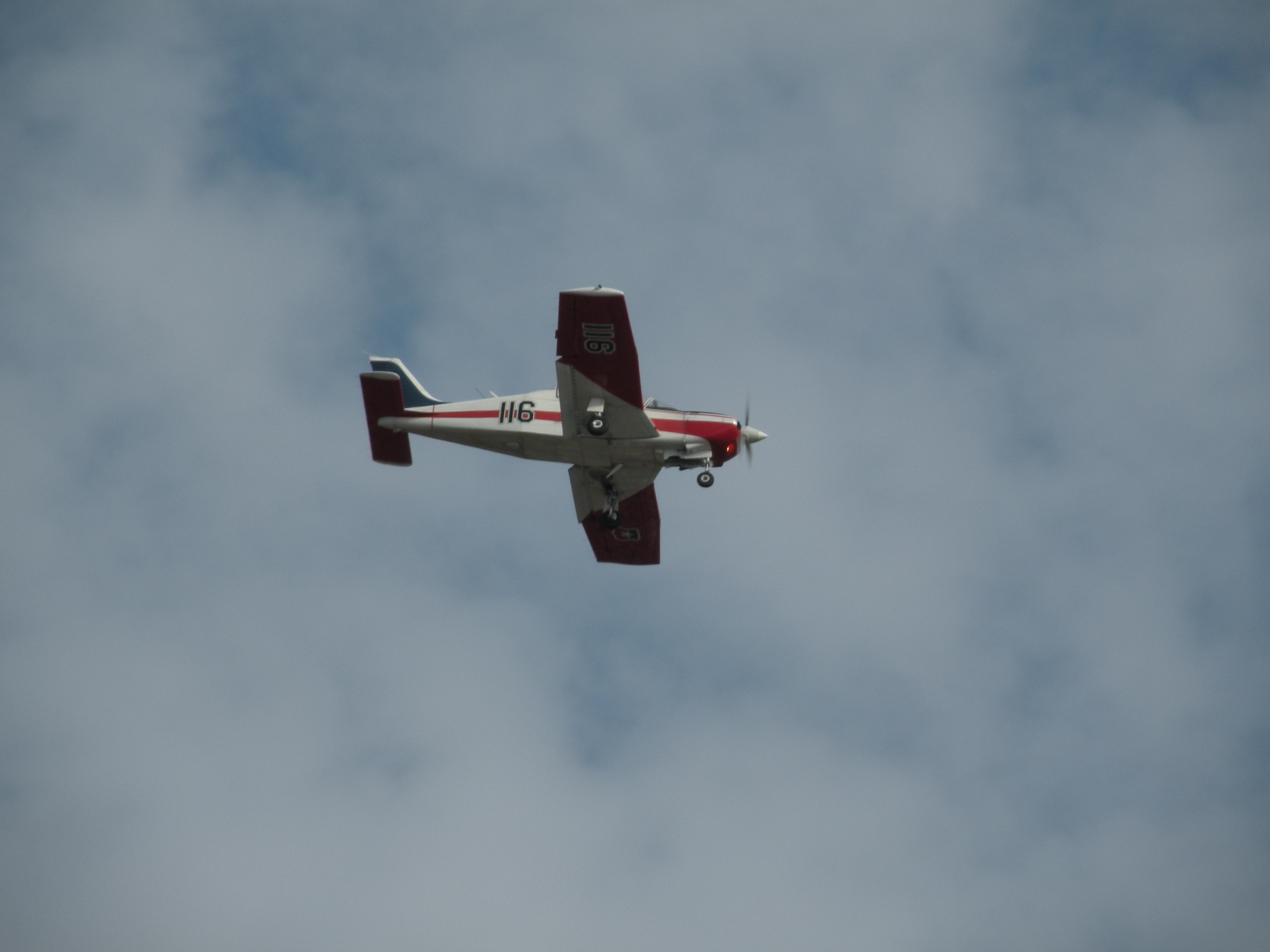
T-35 Pillán

Aircraft	Origin	Role	Variant	In service	Notes
Combat aircraft
F-35A Lightning II	United States	Multirole	F-35A	still under consideration	it was chosen to replace the aging F-5s and complement the F-16s
Northrop F-5	United States	Light fighter	F-5E F-5F	8 3	Originally, 18 F-5E/F Tiger IIs were acquired in 1975. In the 1990s, they were upgraded to the F-5 Tiger III variant. F-5F used as trainers.
F-16 Fighting Falcon	United States	Multirole	F-16C/D F-16A/B MLU	10 36	10 F-16C/D Block 50 received from the US in 2006 and 36 F-16 AM/BM MLU Block 15/20 from the RNLAF between 2006 and 2011. 11 F-16B/D used as trainers.
AEW&C
E-3 Sentry	United States	AEW&C	E-3D MK1	2	3 units received from the RAF in 2022, one for spare parts.
Reconnaissance
Cessna L-19	United States	Liaison / SAR	L-19A	3	Originally, 6 units were acquired in 1955.
Cessna O-2 Skymaster	United States	Liaison / SAR	O-2A	2	
Tanker
KC-135 Stratotanker	United States	Aerial refueling / transport	KC-135E	3	3 units received from the USAF between 2010 and 2012.
KC-130 Hercules	United States	Transport / aerial refueling	KC-130R	3	Originally, 4 units of this transport variant were received from the USN between 2015 and 2016. They have the capability to refuel the F-5E/F Tiger III in flight.
Transport / Utility
DHC-6 Twin Otter	Canada	Utility / transport	DHC-6-100 DHC-6-300	13	Originally, 20 units were acquired; 8 of the 100 series in 1966, 6 of the 300 series to LAM in 1974 and 6 more of the 300 series in 1978.
C-130 Hercules	United States	Transport	C-130H	4	2 units of this transport variant were received from Lockheed Martin between 1972 and 1973. In 2021, 2 more units were received from the USAF, with a third unit being contemplated.
C-212 Aviocar	Spain	Transport	C-212-200 C-212-300	2 1	Originally 4 units received since March 1995; 2 C-212-200 and 2 C-212-300.
Boeing 737	United States	Transport	330QC 58N	1 1	
Cessna CitationJet	United States	VIP transport / trainer	CJ1	4	4 units received in 2001.
Gulfstream G-IV	United States	VIP transport / utility		4	4 aircraft in total; the first acquired in 2005, the second in 2015, the third in 2020 and the fourth in 2021.
Boeing 767	United States	Transport	300ER	1	1 unit incorporated in 2008.
Helicopters
UH-1 Iroquois	United States	Utility	UH-1H	13	Its replacement is contemplated by 14 units of a helicopter to choose from during the second half of 2023.
Bell 206	United States	Utility	206B Jet Ranger III	5	
UH-60 Black Hawk	United States	Transport / utility	S-70A-39 (UH-60L) S-70i (MH-60M)	1 6	1 unit acquired in 1998. 6 units of PZL Mielec in 2018.
Bell 412	United States	Utility	412SP 412EP	16	
Trainer aircraft
T-35 Pillán	Chile	Trainer	T-35A T-35B T-35BE	30	Various units received from ENAER starting in 1986. They will be replaced from the 2027-2028 period by 33 T-35 Pillán II aircraft.
A-29 Super Tucano	Brazil	Advanced trainer / attack	A-29B	22	22 units in total acquired from Embraer; 12 received since 2009, 6 in 2018 and 4 in 2020.
Cirrus SR22	United States	Trainer	SR-22T	8	8 units in total; 2 received in 2013, 2 in 2015, 2 in 2016 and 2 in 2017.
Aerobatic competition aircraft
GB1 GameBird	United Kingdom	Aerobatics		6	Originally 7 units received from Game Composites in 2019.
UAV
Hermes 900	Israel	Surveillance		3	3 units purchased from Elbit Systems in 2011.
Mantis	Spain	Surveillance		2	UAVs acquired around 2014.

== Chilean Naval Aviation ==
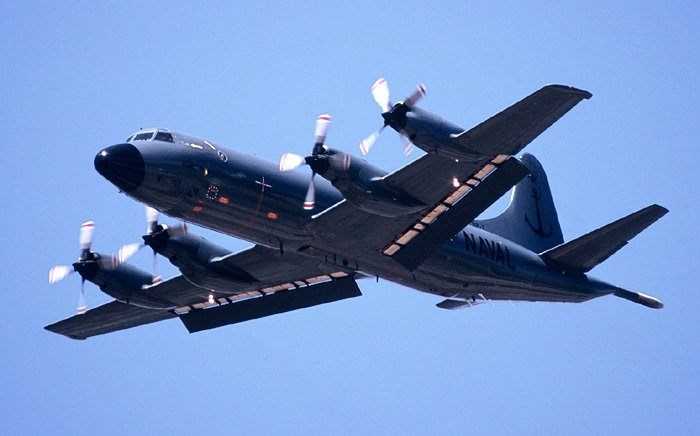
P-3ACH Orion

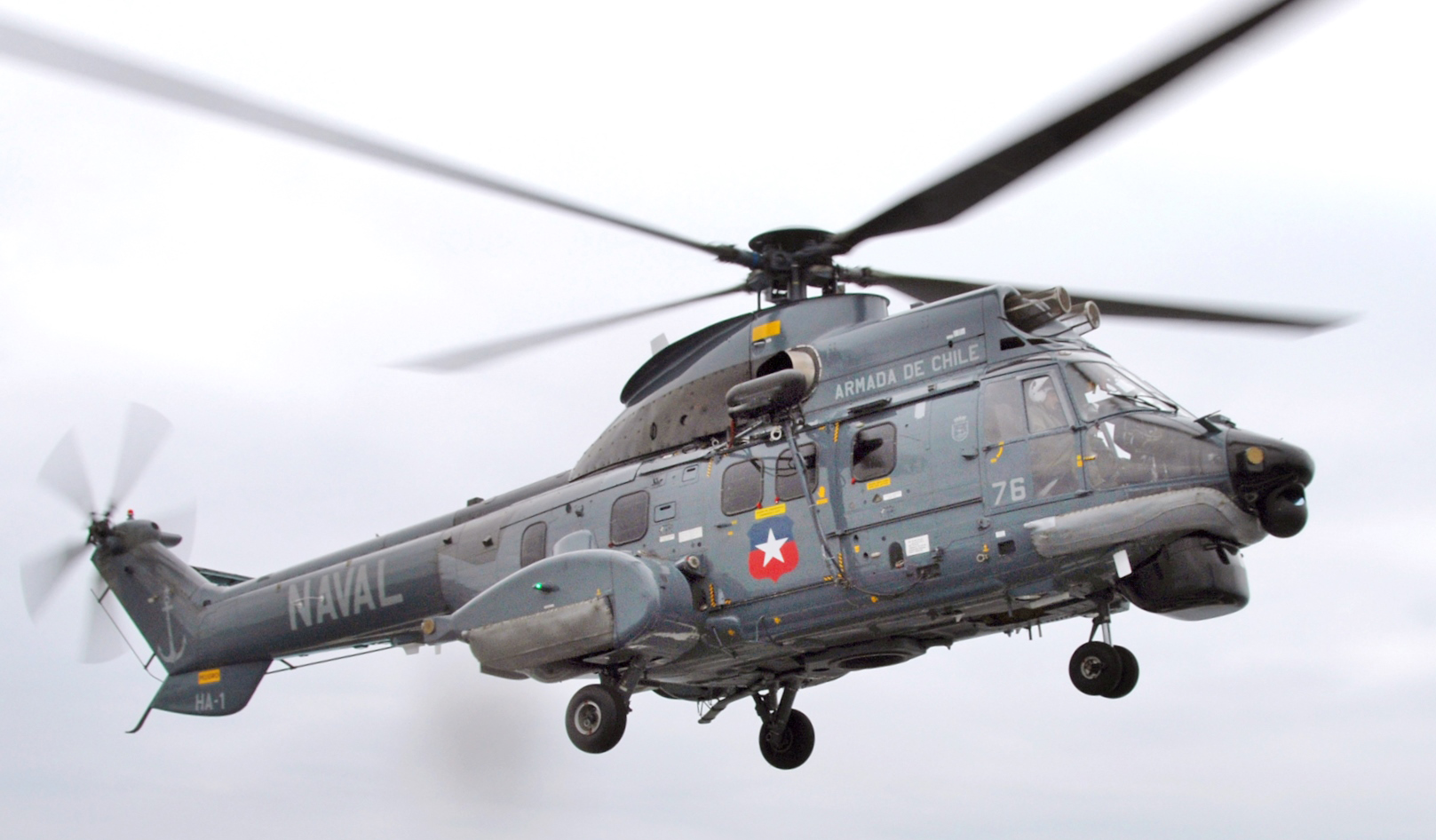
AS332 Super Puma

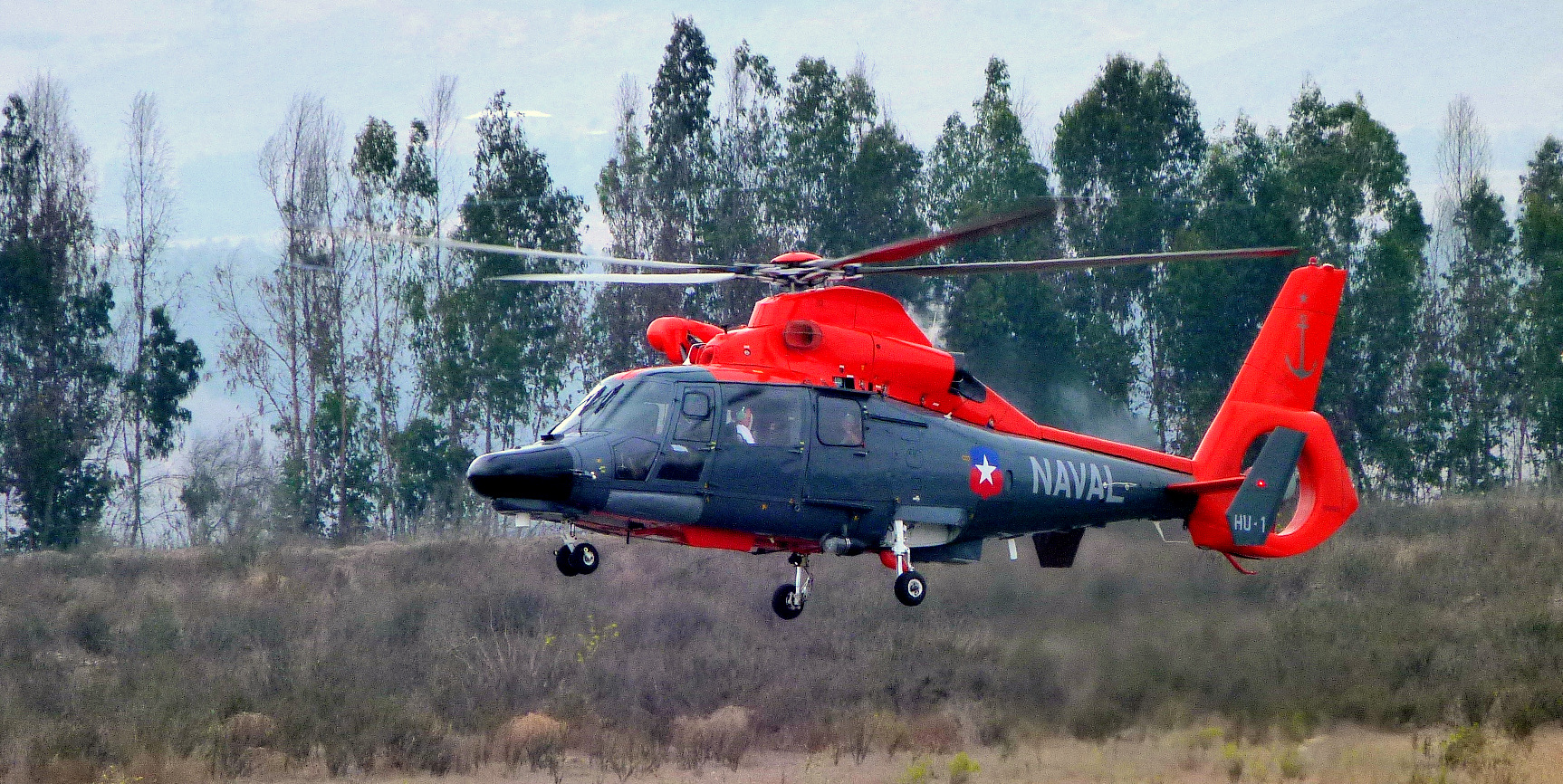
AS365 Dauphin

Aircraft	Origin	Role	Variant	In service	Notes
Maritime patrol
EMB 110 Bandeirante	Brazil	MPA	EMB 111AN (P-111)	4	Originally, 6 aircraft of this variant were acquired in 1976; receiving 3 in 1978 and 3 in 1979.
P-3 Orion	United States	MPA / ASW	P-3ACH Orion	2	Originally, 6 second-hand aircraft were received from the US as of 1993; 2 from the P-3A anti-submarine version and 6 from the UP-3A transport version. Half of the aircraft was put into service and the rest for technical training. The 2 current units were delivered modernized in 2019 and 2021 by IMP Aerospace.
C-295 Persuader	Spain	MPA MPA / ASW	C-295 MPA C-295 MPA/ASW	1 2	3 aircraft purchased from EADS CASA in 2007 and received between 2010 and 2011.
Partenavia P.68	Italy	Recce / utility	P68 Observer 2	7	7 units purchased from Vulcanair Aircraft in 2015.
Transport
EMB 110 Bandeirante	Brazil	Transport	EMB 110C (C-111)	1	Originally 3 aircraft of this variant acquired in 1975.
Helicopters
Bo 105 Bölkow (UH-05)	Germany	Utility	Bo 105CBS	4	Originally, 7 units were incorporated in the early 1990s.
AS332 Super Puma	France	ASuW / ASW / utility	AS332F1 (SH-32) AS332L (HH-32)	5 2	
AS365 Dauphin (HH-65)	France	Utility		9	9 second-hand units in total; 4 received between 2005 and 2006, 4 more acquired in 2008 and the ninth unit received in 2021.
AS350/H125 (HH-50) Écureuil	France	Utility		5	5 units acquired in 2019; 1 received in 2020, 2 in 2021, 1 in 2022 and the last one in 2023.
Trainer aircraft
Pilatus PC-7 Turbo Trainer	Switzerland	Trainer / attack		7	Originally there were 10 aircraft; 8 received in 1980 and 2 in 1981.

== Chilean Army Aviation Brigade ==
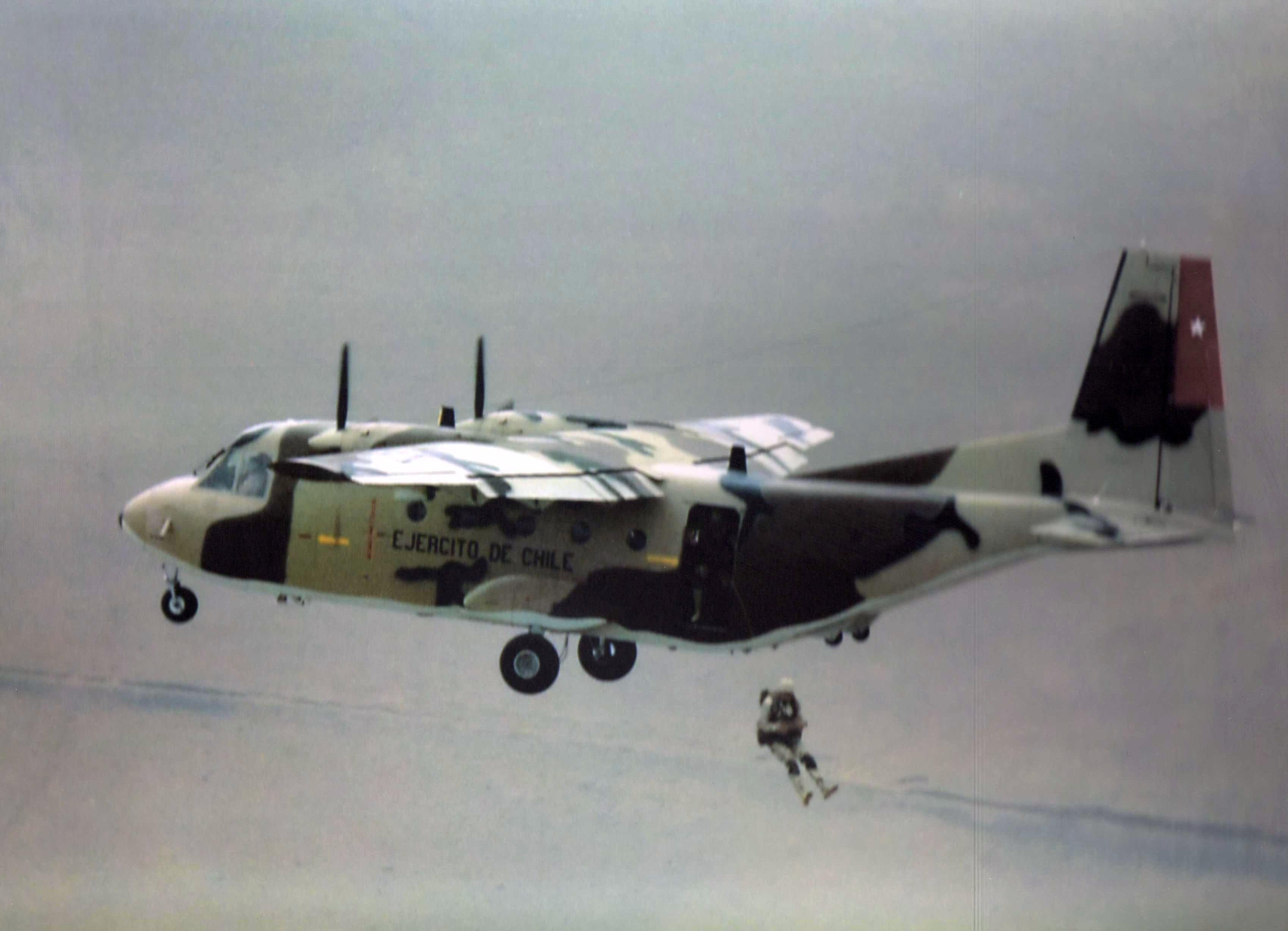
C-212 Aviocar

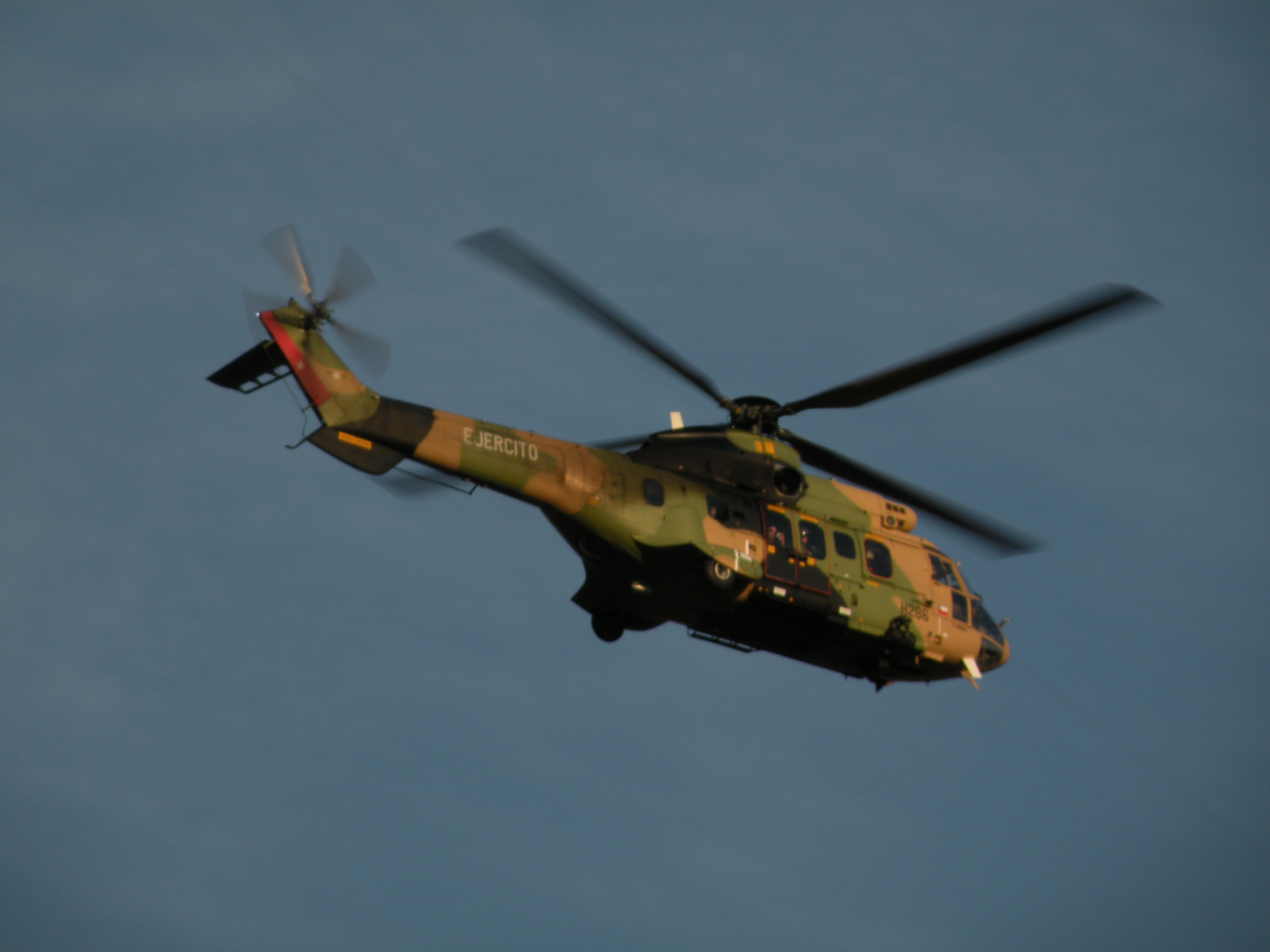
AS532 Cougar

Aircraft	Origin	Role	Variant	In service	Notes
Transport / Utility
CN-235	Spain	Transport	CN-235-100	3	3 units of this variant acquired at the end of the 80s. 1 unit lost in 1992 and replaced by another CN-235 of the same variant.
Cessna 208 Caravan	United States	Transport / utility	208B Grand Caravan	3	
C-212 Aviocar	Spain	Transport	C-212-300	2	Originally 3 units of this variant received in 1998.
Cessna Citation C-680 Sovereign	United States	Transport / utility		1	
Helicopters
SA330 Puma	France	Transport / utility	SA330L	2	
MD 500 Defender	United States	Recce / attack	MD 530F	8	Originally 20 units were acquired; a first batch in 1989 and then two more batches in 1993 and 1994.
AS350/H125 Écureuil	France	Utility	AS350B2 AS350B3	2 2	
AS355 Écureuil 2	France	Utility	AS355N	1	
AS532/H215M Cougar	France	Transport / utility	AS532AL AS532Ale	8 2	8 units of this variant received between 2008 and 2016. 2 units of this variant received in 2013 and 2014.
Trainer aircraft
Cessna 172	United States	Trainer	172S	2	2 aircraft that were incorporated in 2015.

== See also ==
- List of current equipment of the Chilean Army
- List of current equipment of the Chilean Navy
- List of active ships of the Chilean Navy
