= List of current equipment of the Chilean Air Force =

This is a list of equipment used by the Chilean Air Force (FACH), the branch of the Chilean Armed Forces that specializes in aerial warfare.

== Equipment ==
=== Aircraft ===
==== Aircraft main armaments ====
AIM-120 AMRAAM

AGM-65 Maverick

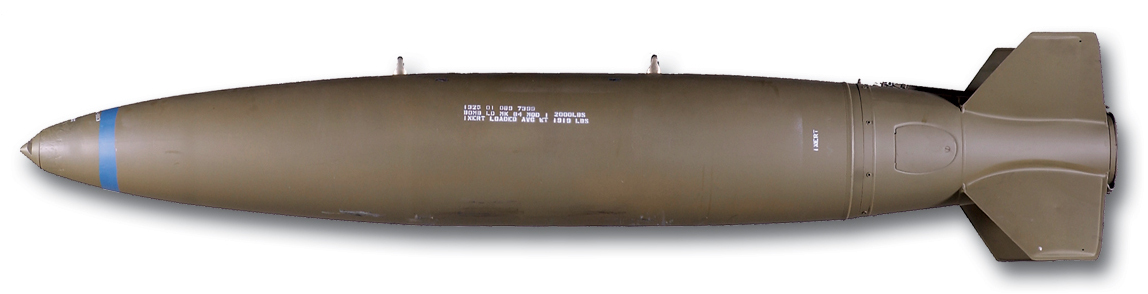
Mark 84

GBU-24 Paveway III

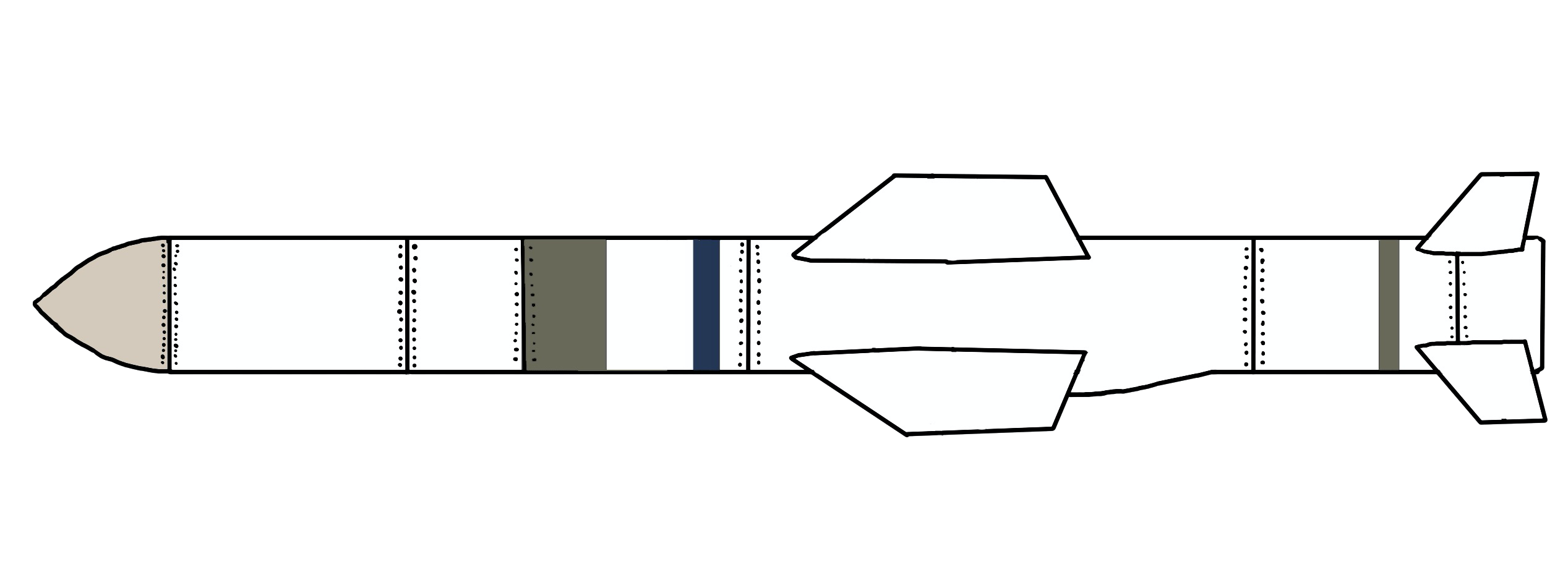
AGM-84 Harpoon

Name	Origin	Type	Variant
Air-to-air missile (AAM)
AIM-9 Sidewinder	United States	Short-range air-to-air missile	AIM-9L AIM-9M
AIM-120 AMRAAM	United States	Beyond-visual-range missile	AIM-120C5 AIM-120C7
Python	Israel	Short-range air-to-air missile	Python IV Python V
Derby	Israel	Beyond-visual-range missile	
Air-to-surface missile (ASM)
AGM-65 Maverick	United States	Air-to-ground missile	AGM-65F AGM-65G
General-purpose bomb
Mark 82	United States	Unguided bomb	
Mark 83	United States	Unguided bomb	
Mark 84	United States	Unguided bomb	
GBU-10 Paveway II	United States	Laser-guided bomb	
GBU-12 Paveway II	United States	Laser-guided bomb	
GBU-24 Paveway III	United States	Laser-guided bomb	
JDAM	United States	Precision-guided munition	
LJDAM	United States	Laser joint direct attack munition	
Spice	Israel	Precision-guided munition	
Anti-ship missile
Harpoon	United States	Anti-ship missile	AGM-84

=== Air defense systems ===
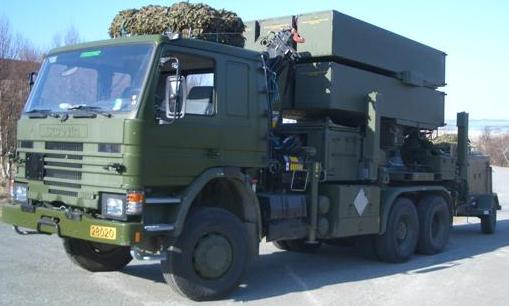
NASAMS

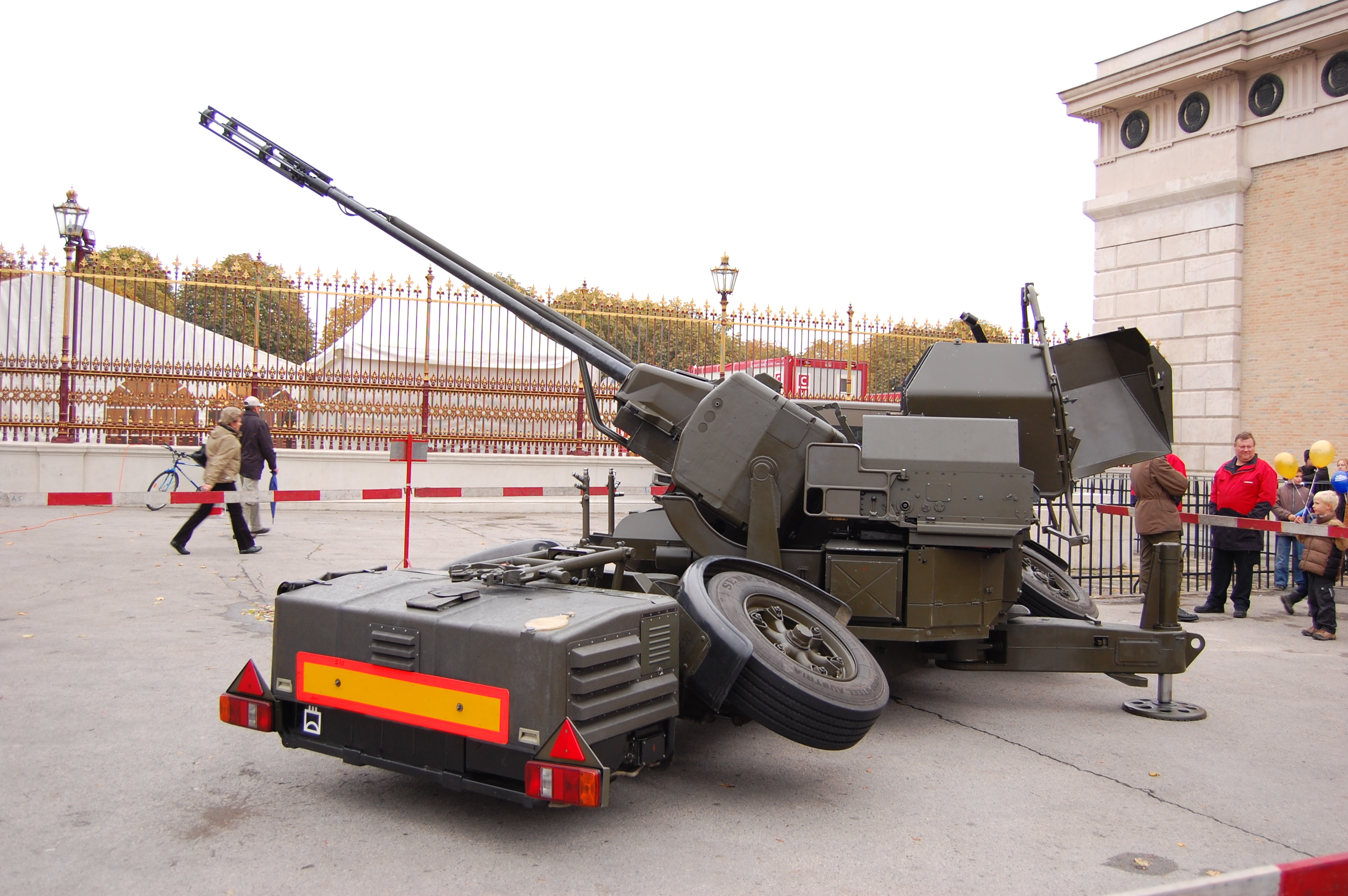
Oerlikon GDF

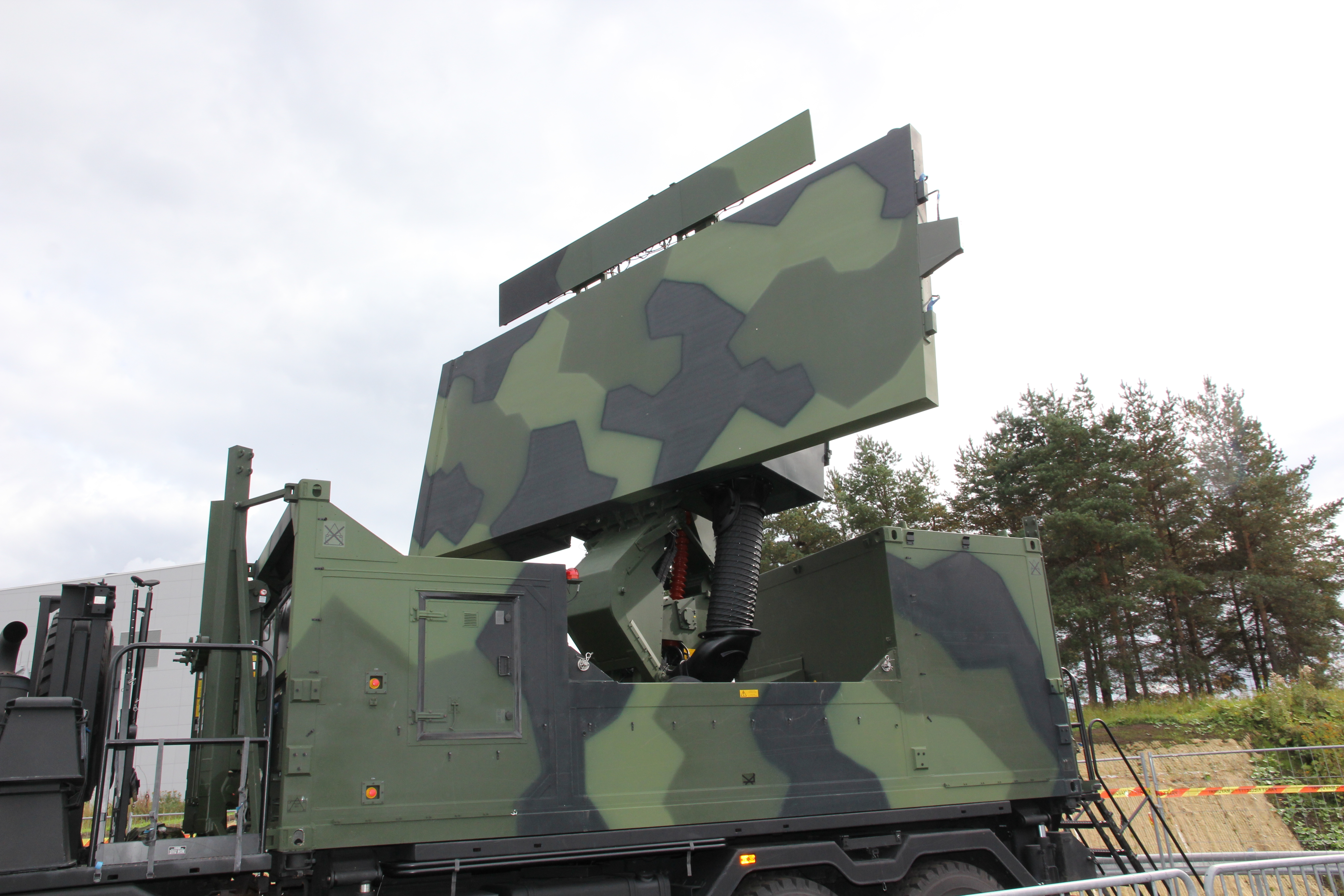
GM400

Name	Origin	Type	Variant	Notes
Surface-to-air missile (SAM)
Mistral	France	Short range air defense	Mistral 1	Mistral 1 in portable configuration, and can be mounted on DAF YA 4440 4x4 trucks.
Mygale	France	Short range air defense	Mistral 1	Base defense system composed of a Thomson-CSF (Thales) Samantha mobile radar, installed on ACMAT VLRA 6X6 and Mercedes-Benz LAK 1418 4x4 trucks, and Aspic firing units with 4 Mistral 1 missiles each, mounted on Peugeot P4 4x4 vehicles.
NASAMS	Norway / United States	Short-medium range air defense	NASAMS II	3 batteries purchased in 2010; 2 static batteries and 1 mobile battery. They use AIM-120D AMRAAM missiles and are associated with AN/MPQ-64F1 Sentinel radars. NASAMS systems and Sentinel radars can be mounted on Scania P-340D 4x4 and Mercedes-Benz Zetros 2733 6X6 trucks, respectively.
Anti-aircraft artillery
M163 VADS	United States	Self-propelled anti-aircraft gun	M-163A1	Associated with ELTA EL/M-2106 radars on M-113 vehicles.
M167 VADS	United States	Towed anti-aircraft gun		
Oerlikon GDF	Switzerland	Towed anti-aircraft gun	GDF-005 GDF-007	They use the FCS Sky Guard III shooting director.
Individual radar
GM400	(France) FR	Long range air defense 3D radar		Mounted on Mercedes-Benz Zetros 2733 6X6 trucks.

=== Satellite system ===
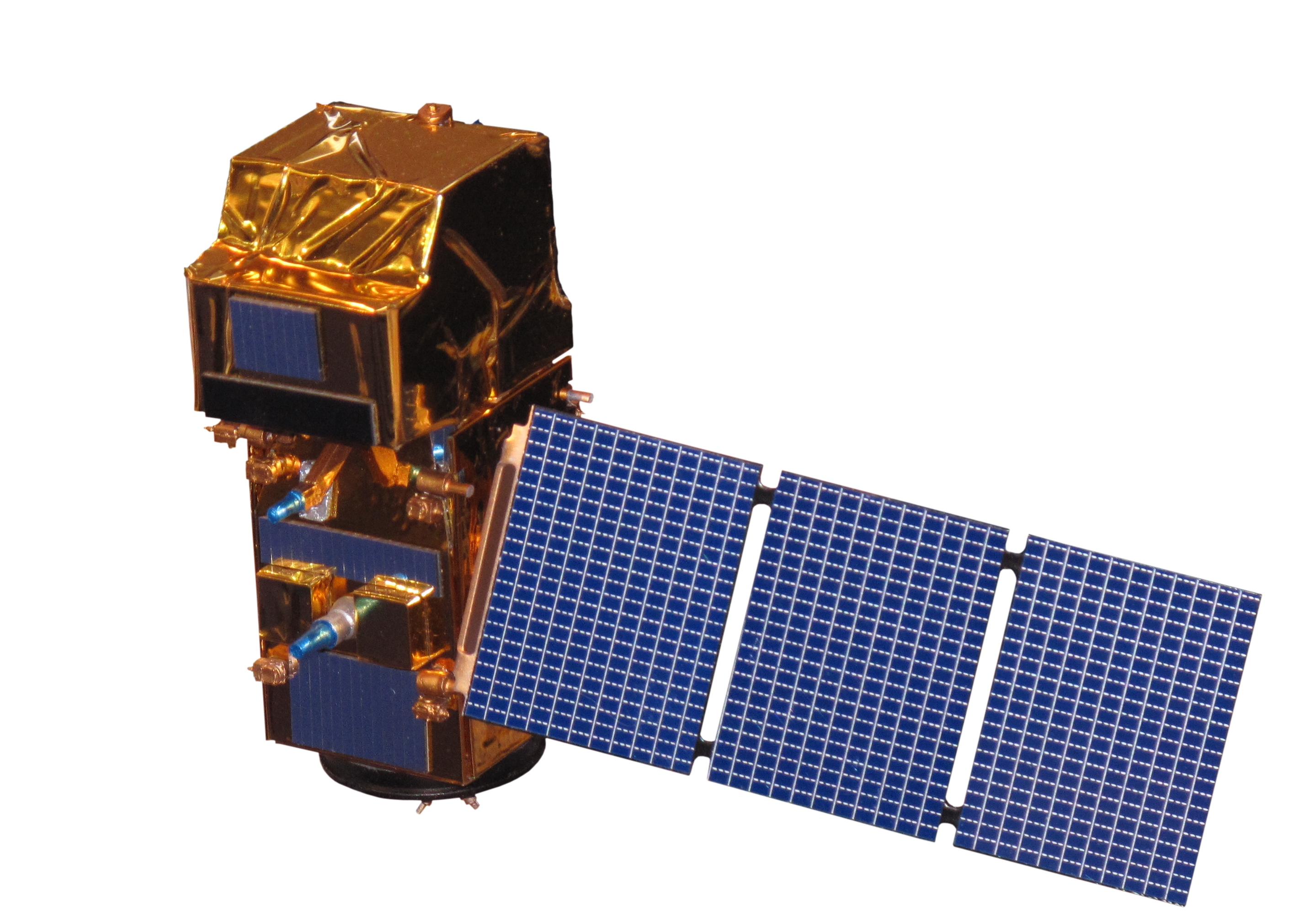
Earth observation satellite

Unit	Origin	Type	Notes
Fasat-Charlie	France	Earth observation satellite	Satellite put into orbit in 2011, and which was built in France by the Astrium company, currently Airbus Defense and Space.
Fasat-Delta	Israel / United States	Multipurpose remote sensing satellite	It is a SmallSat satellite, of the Runner class, developed by the Israeli company ImageSat International (ISI) and the American company Tyvak, which was launched in June 2023. This satellite marks the beginning of Chile's national satellite system; which contemplates, among other things, the construction of two more satellites of the same class and seven minisatellites.

=== Vehicles ===
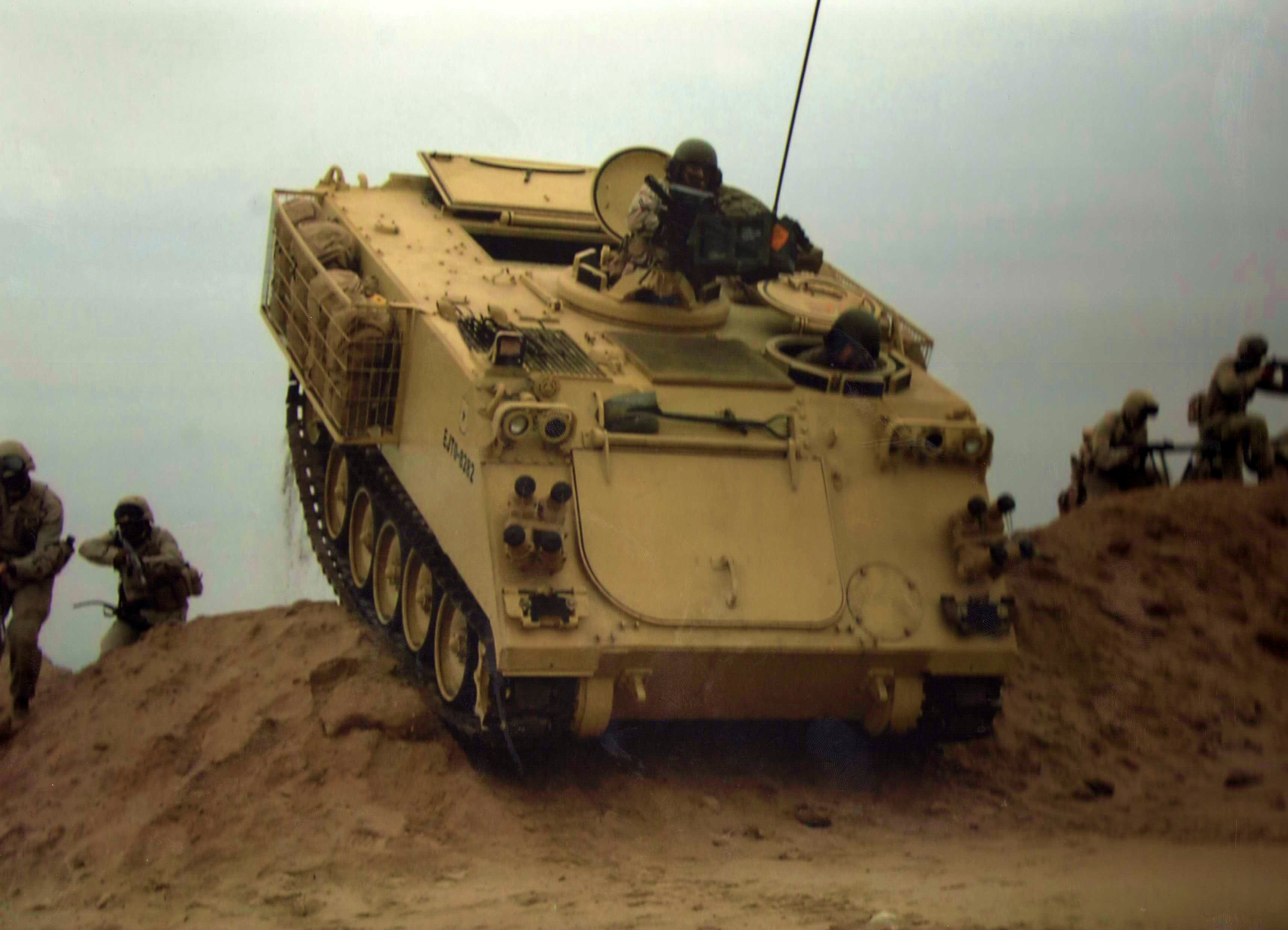
M113

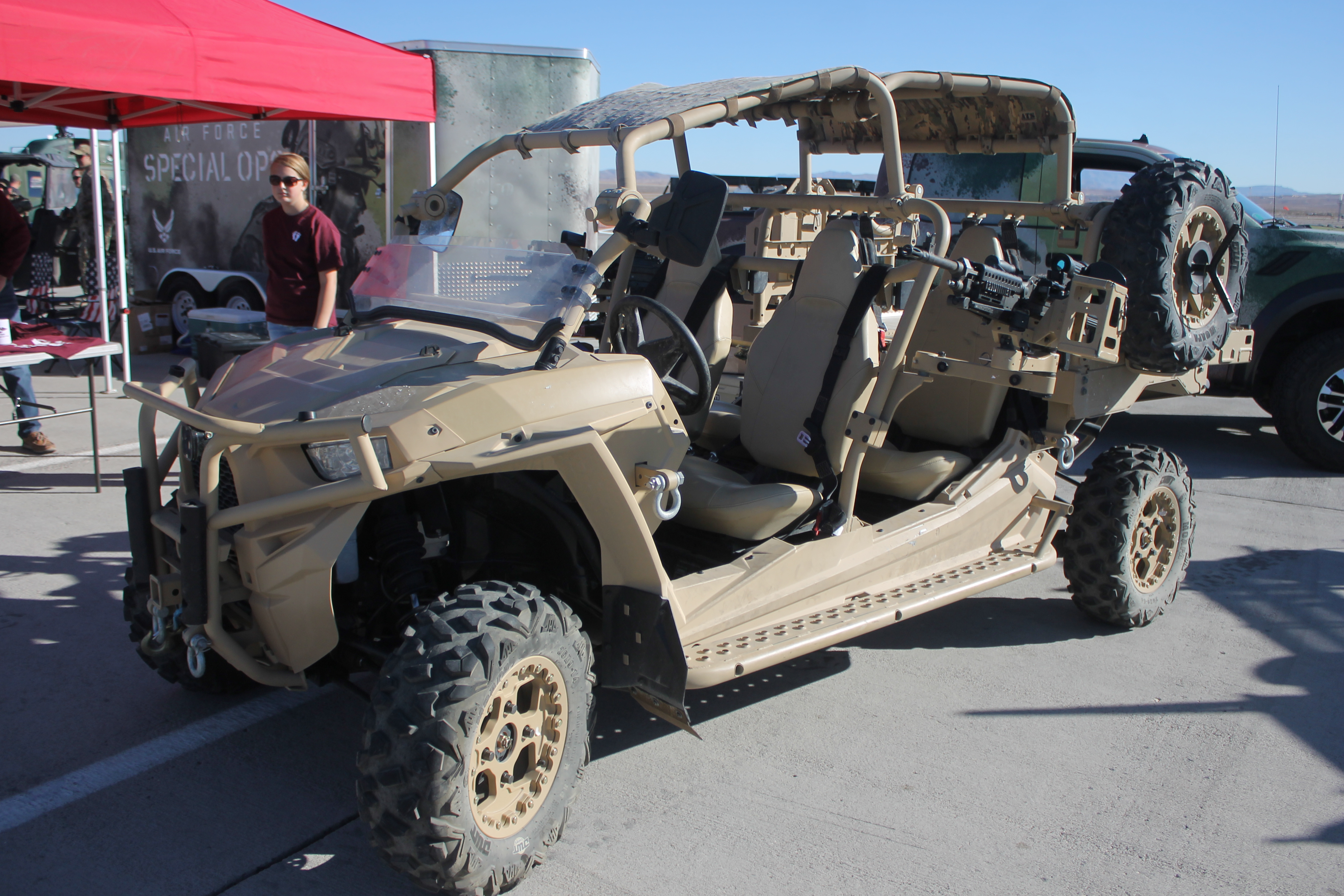
Polaris Defense MRZR

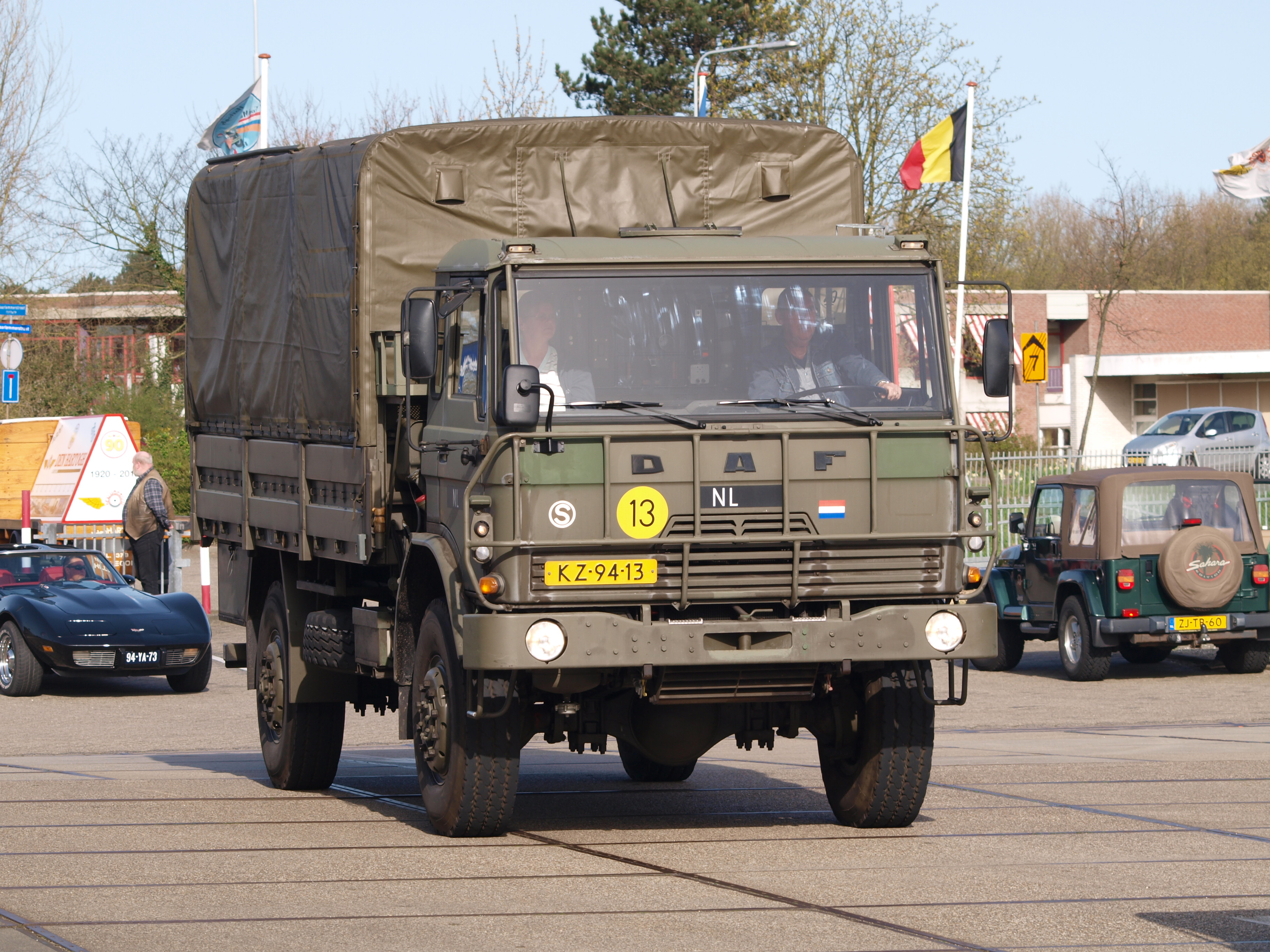
DAF YA 4440

Name	Origin	Role	Notes
Armoured vehicle
M113 / M163 VADS	(United States) US	Armoured personnel carrier	Several M-163s have been converted to troop transport vehicles.
YPR-765	(United States) US	Infantry fighting vehicle	
Utility vehicle
Peugeot P4	(France) FR	Light utility vehicle	4X4 vehicles used as part of the Mygale air defense system.
Honda XR250 Tornado	(Japan) JP	Off-road motorcycle	
M1113 HMMWV	(United States) US	Expanded capacity vehicle	4x4 vehicles used as shelter for telecommunications and detection.
Kia KM 420	(South Korea) KOR	Light utility vehicle	4x4 vehicles used for reconnaissance and logistic support. They have mounts for FN MAG machine guns.
ATV Polaris Defense MRZR D2	(United States) US	Side-by-side	4X4 vehicles used for reconnaissance and logistic support.
Support truck
DAF 1700	(Netherlands) NL	Utility truck	It is 4x4 trucks.
DAF YFZ 2300 / YTH-2300	(Netherlands) NL	Utility truck	It is 4x4 trucks.
DAF YA 4440/4442	(Netherlands) NL	Utility truck	4x4 trucks used for the transport and shelter of communication equipment.
ACMAT VLRA	(France) FR	Shelter truck	6X6 trucks used as part of the Mygale air defense system.
Unimog 1300L	(Germany) DE	Utility truck	It is 4x4 trucks.
Mercedes-Benz LAK 1113	(Germany) DE / (Brazil) BR	Utility truck	It is 4x4 trucks.
Mercedes-Benz LAK 1418	(Germany) DE / (Brazil) BR	Shelter truck	4X4 trucks used as part of the Mygale air defense system.
Freightliner FL-80	(United States) US	Tanker truck	6X6 tanker trucks.
Chevrolet 3500 SEI	(United States) US	Utility truck	4x4 pickup trucks.
Ford F-550 Hazmat	(United States) US	Utility truck	4x4 pickup trucks.
Mercedes-Benz Zetros 2733	(Germany) DE	Utility truck	6X6 trucks used as transport and to mount radars.
Scania P-340D	(Sweden) SE	Utility truck	4x4 trucks used to mount the NASAMS systems.
XCMG QY70K-I	(China) CN	Truck crane	8x8 trucks with cranes acquired in 2015.
BeiBen 1634	(China) CN	Utility truck	4x4 trucks of the cistern and troop transport models.
BeiBen 4840	(China) CN	Truck crane	It is 8x8 trucks.
Ford Super Duty F-350	(United States) US	Shelter truck	4x4 pickup truck used as a telecommunications shelter.
Hyundai Mighty EX8	(South Korea) KOR	Hospital truck	It is 4x4 trucks.
Kia KM 451	(South Korea) KOR	Ambulance truck	It is 4x4 light trucks.

=== Infantry weapons ===
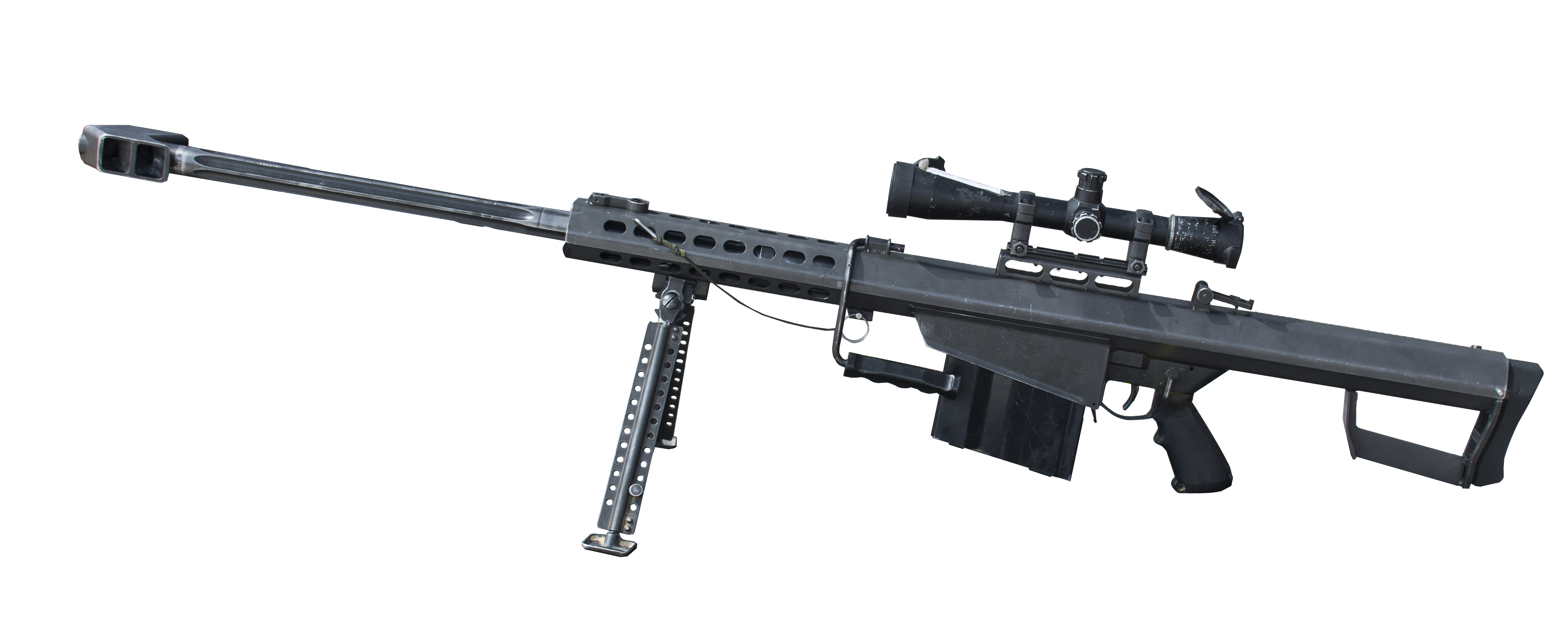
Barrett M82A1

Name	Origin	Type	Cartridge	Notes
Handgun
Colt .45 caliber	(United States) US	Semi-automatic pistol	11.43×23 mm	
Walther PPQ M2	(Germany) DE	Semi-automatic pistol	9×19 mm	
Battle / assault rifle
IMI Galil	(Israel) IL	Assault rifle	5.56×45 mm	There are ARM, SAR and Sniper variants.
FN SCAR-L	(Belgium) BE	Assault rifle	5.56×45 mm	
Sniper rifle
IMI Galil Sniper	(Israel) IL	Designated marksman rifle	5.56×45 mm	
Barrett M82A1	(United States) US	Anti-materiel sniper rifle	12.7×99 mm	
Accuracy International AX50	(United Kingdom) UK	Anti materiel sniper rifle	12.7×99 mm	
Submachine gun
Mini Uzi	(Israel) IL	Submachine gun	9×19 mm	
Heckler & Koch MP5	(Germany) DE	Submachine gun	9×19 mm	
Machine gun
Heckler & Koch HK21	(Germany) DE	General-purpose machine gun	5.56×45 mm	
FN Minimi	(Belgium) BE	Light machine gun	5.56×45 mm	
FN MAG	(Belgium) BE	General-purpose machine gun	7.62×51 mm	Mounted on Kia KM 420 vehicles.
Grenade launcher
Milkor MGL Mk1	(South Africa) SA	Revolver grenade launcher	40 mm	
FN MK13 EGLM	(Belgium) BE	Coupled grenade launcher	40 mm	
Anti-armor weapon
Instalaza C90	(Spain) ES	Rocket-propelled grenade	90 mm	
Mortar
—	(Israel) IL	Light mortar	60 mm	

== See also ==
- List of current equipment of the Chilean Army
- List of current equipment of the Chilean Navy
- List of active ships of the Chilean Navy
