= FAMAE =

Chilean state-owned weapons manufacturing company

Fábricas y Maestranzas del Ejército de Chile
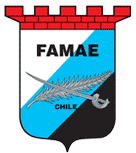
- Native name: Spanish: Fábricas y Maestranzas del Ejército de Chile
- Company type: State-owned company
- Industry: defense
- Founded: 1811; 215 years ago
- Headquarters: Santiago, Chile
- Area served: Worldwide
- Key people: Rony Jara Lecanda (President)
- Products: Munitions; Firearm; Artillery; Explosive; Combat vehicle
- Website: www.famae.cl

FAMAE (Spanish: Fábricas y Maestranzas del Ejército, lit. 'Factories and Workshops of the Army') is a Chilean state-owned firearms manufacturer. Its products are used by the Chilean armed forces and the Carabineros police force. The company produces the FAMAE CT-30 carbine, the FAMAE SAF submachine gun, the FAMAE FD-200 sniper rifle, the SLM MLRS, and the FAMAE revolver, among other types of weaponry.

== History ==
FAMAE began on October 8, 1811, when Francisco Ramon Vicuña was mandated to commission an arms factory.

The name has changed a number of times over the years:

- In 1817, the factory was renamed the Arsenal de Artillería.
- In 1822, the factory was renamed the Fábrica de Armas de la Nación.
- In 1923, the factory was renamed the Fábricas y Maestranzas del Ejército.
- In 1930, the factory was renamed the Fábricas y Maestranzas del Ejército de Chile.
- In 1953, the factory was renamed the Fábricas y Maestranzas del Ejército de Chile FAMAE.

== Projects ==
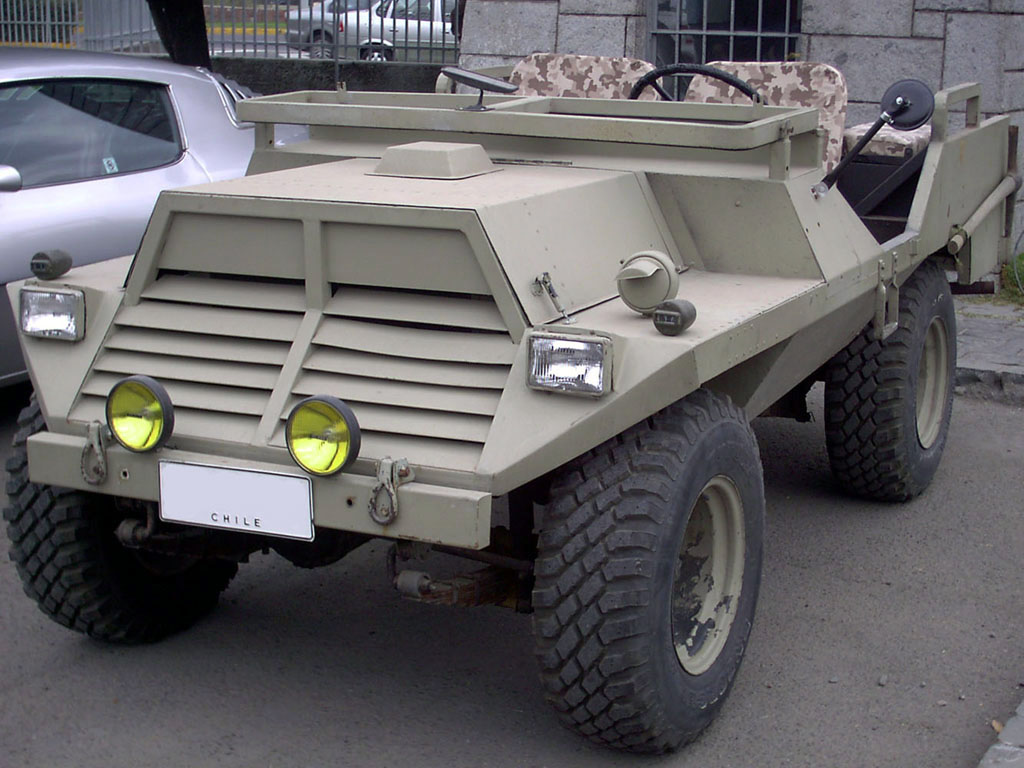
The 1975 FAMAE Corvo light 4x4 never went beyond the prototype stage

- Projects to supply weapons for tanks and armored units.
- Draft carts and arms supplies for mechanized infantry battalions.
- Projects for modernization of shells for light artillery units.
- Projects for provision, integration, and modernization of weapons systems, tanks, weaponry, and auxiliary trolleys for larger units that make up the infantry, armor, artillery and engineering.

The development of defense engineering projects also includes the SETAC Simulation System "Training System for Tactical Commanders", which consists of a computerized tactical training simulator that is in use in major Latin American armies.

In the 1960s, FAMAE began to export its products to other countries. The company's products are now used by the armed forces of over 20 countries.

In recent years, FAMAE has focused on research and development. Among its projects are the licensed versions of the Swiss-designed SIG SG 510-4 rifle, and SIG SG 542 rifle; FAMAE SAF submachine gun (also known as "Famas"), Corvo military knives and Rayo MLRS and its related development the SLM MLRS. FAMAE is responsible for modifying and maintaining the tanks, aircraft and other military devices that are used by the Chilean Army.

FAMAE specializes in research projects and weapon system modernization.
