= Lautaro Special Operations Brigade =

Chilean military command unit

The Lautaro Special Operations Brigade (Brigada de Operaciones Especiales "Lautaro," BOE) is the unified combatant command charged with overseeing the various special warfare brigade component commands of the Chilean Army. The brigade is part of the Chilean Army. It is made up of units of special forces and special operations forces operators including airborne forces, counterterrorism and hostage rescue, jungle, mountain, military communication, military education and training, military intelligence, military logistic, military polices, snipers, tactical diving, and urban.

Lautaro Special Operations Brigade is involved with clandestine and covert operations activity such as air assault and airborne operations to infiltrate areas behind enemy lines, combat search and rescue, counter-narcotics, counterinsurgency, counterterrorism and hostage rescue crisis management, direct action towards important military strategics, executive protection, foreign internal defense, irregular warfare, ISTAR, long-range penetration, manhunting high value targets, providing security in areas at risk of attack or terrorism, psychological warfare, and special reconnaissance. And including black operations to carry out intelligence or military operations that are extremely risky and sensitive to international relations.

The brigade is located in the town of Peldehue, in the military camp of the same name (the former Arteaga fortress), in the commune of Colina, north of the city of Santiago de Chile. To enable the activation of the brigade, Infantry Regiment No. 22 "Lautaro" and 4th Armored Group Cuirassiers had to be disbanded.

Among its reported units are the 1st Parachute Battalion "Pelantaru"; the 1st Commandos Company "Iquique;" the 10th Commandos Company; the 13th Commandos Company "Escorpión;" and the Grupo Especial de Montaña (Special Mountain Group). In 2010 the IISS Military Balance said the Chilean Army had one special operations brigade with four battalions.

== Units ==
- Parachute and Special Forces School (ESC. PAIR. FEs) [TRAINING]
- Pelantaru Parachute Battalion (BTN. PARAC. N-1)
- Commando Group N°5 "Lientur" (AGRUCOM)
- Commando Group N°6 "Leucotón" (AGRUCOM)
- Commando Group N°12 "Galvarino" (AGRUCOM)
- Special Forces Group (AFE's) [CLANDESTINO]
- Special Mountain Group (AGREM)
- Intelligence Brigade (BRINTEL)
- Telecommunications Platoon (PEL.TEL)
- Administrative Logistics Company (C. L. A)
- Barracks Unit (Military Police - PM)
- Headquarters (GC)

== Equipment ==
The soldiers, often covered in a balaclava, are armed with an M4 Panther carbine with eight magazines as standard – although if they prefer they can use the SIG SG 540 line of rifles or the new IWI Galil ACE – which they often customize with ACOG, Aimpoint CompM2 sights (more common in the military) or AN/PEQ-2 laser; They also carry a flashlight and the standard pistol they use is the Beretta PX4 Storm with 4 magazines of 17 rounds 9×19mm Parabellum. As a submachine gun there is the FAMAE SAF, but they also have the Heckler & Koch MP5 available. As a light machine gun they use the FN Minimi and as a sniper rifle the Barrett M82 stands out, but they have also been seen using the French PGM 338 and Swiss APR 338. In night operations, ATN 6015-4 night visors are added to their helmets.

== Cobra Commando Anti-Terrorist Unit (UAT Cobra) ==
Cobra Company (U.A.T.) and Cobra A.E were an anti-terrorist unit of the former School of Paratroopers and Special Forces (ESPAR and FF. EE) of the Chilean Army. Reorganized around 2006 in the form of a brigade, there is no data to be sure when it was disbanded or whether it was disbanded or not. Official sources consider that it ceased to exist between 1998 and 2000; and that the descendants of the Cobra (UAT) or their evolution in the BOE may be the Groups: (N°12 GALVARINO) or (Special Forces) of the Army.
