= Kia KM250 =

6x6 tactical truck

KM250
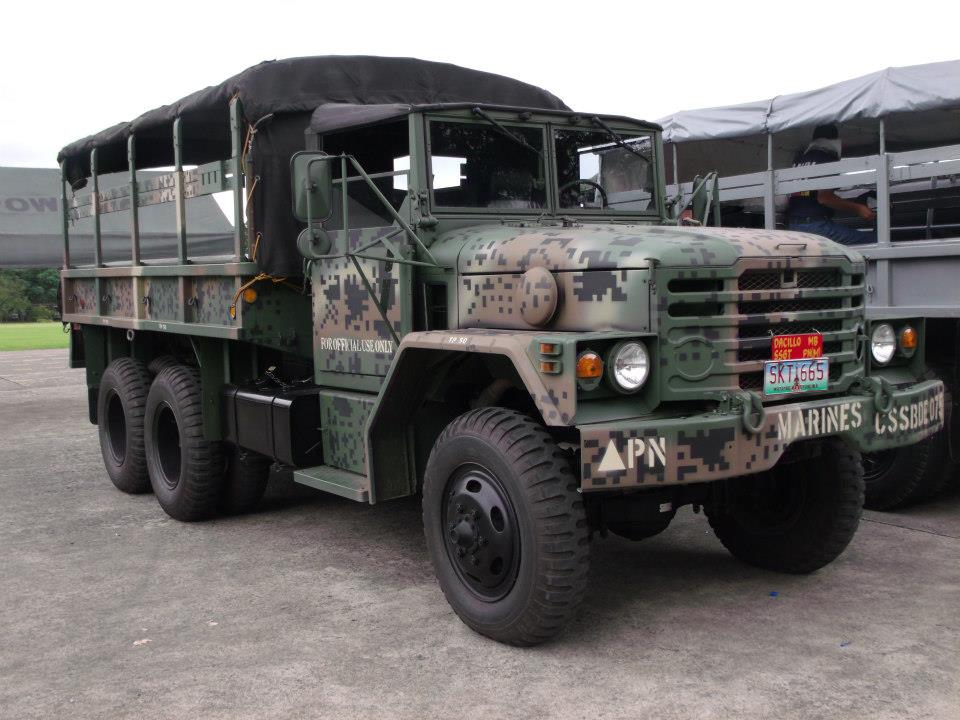
- KM-25 (6X6) Truck of the Combat Service Support Brigade of the Philippine Marine Corps.
- Type: 2 1/2-ton (2,270kg) 6×6 cargo truck
- Place of origin: South Korea

Production history
- Designer: KIA
- Manufacturer: KIA Motors
- Produced: 1978–present

Specifications
- Mass: 25,353 lb (11,500 kg) (gross)
- Length: 267.72 in (6.80 m)
- Width: 98.43 in (2.50 m)
- Height: 114.17 in (2.90 m)
- Crew: 2 + 20 passengers
- Engine: KK-7.4; 180 hp (130 kW)
- Transmission: 5 Speed manual transmission and 2 Speed transfer case
- Suspension: Differential locking device mounted on the differential on the rear axles
- Operational range: 600 mi (970 km)
- Maximum speed: 95 km/h (59 mph)

The KM250, alternately K511, is a family of 6x6 tactical truck manufactured by Kia Motors in South Korea. It is an updated version of the US-made M35A2 cargo truck. While retaining the classic American look of long bonnet, soft-topped cab and a large carrying area, KIA has integrated the truck with several modern features.

== History ==
The KM250 is developed on the basis of the classic American truck M35A2, which was manufactured under license.

In April 2020, a $1.4 billion deal was signed for a total of 10,000 new trucks. These vehicles are set to replace the Republic of Korea Army's (RoKA's) in-service K511 (KM250) and K71 (KM500) vehicles which have been in service with the RoKA and a few other countries for more than 40 years. In particular, the KM250 will be replaced by a truck with a hoodless cab and the possibility of installing additional reservations.

== Description ==
The KM250 is powered by the 180 hp KK-7.4 diesel engine. The truck is capable of cruising at 95 km/h with torque generation recorded to as much as 490Nm. Weighing 6.1 tonnes, the truck, designed with 6x6 configuration, is equipped with a fuel tank, with a capacity of 200 litres of fuel. The 200-litre tank capacity replaces the payload limitation by enabling the vehicle to reach a destination as far as 955 km. It has a payload capacity of 2,270 kg off-road and 4,550 kg on hard surface roads. The vehicle can accommodate up to 22 passengers including 20 fully equipped troops and a crew of two. It is equipped with a pintle hook for towing heavy cargo trailers and 105 millimeter howitzers. It can exert a maximum braking force by utilizing the air over hydraulic technology. The removable slated body walls serve as troop seats when folded down. The canvas top and supporting structure can be removed from both the cab and cargo body. The windshield can be also folded for maximum versatility. A front-mounted winch was optional.

== G.A.T.O.R ==
The GATOR (General-purpose Amphibious Truck, Overside Removable kit) is a Philippine-designed Modular Amphibious Kit for 6x6 truck. It is based on the KIA KM250 6x6 truck or any 6x6 military truck. It has a removable 200HP Mercury jet engine and in-country production thru Self-Reliance Defense Posture [SRDP] Program in partnership with Stoneworks [PH] which is part of the Philippine Army SRDP Project.

== Variants ==
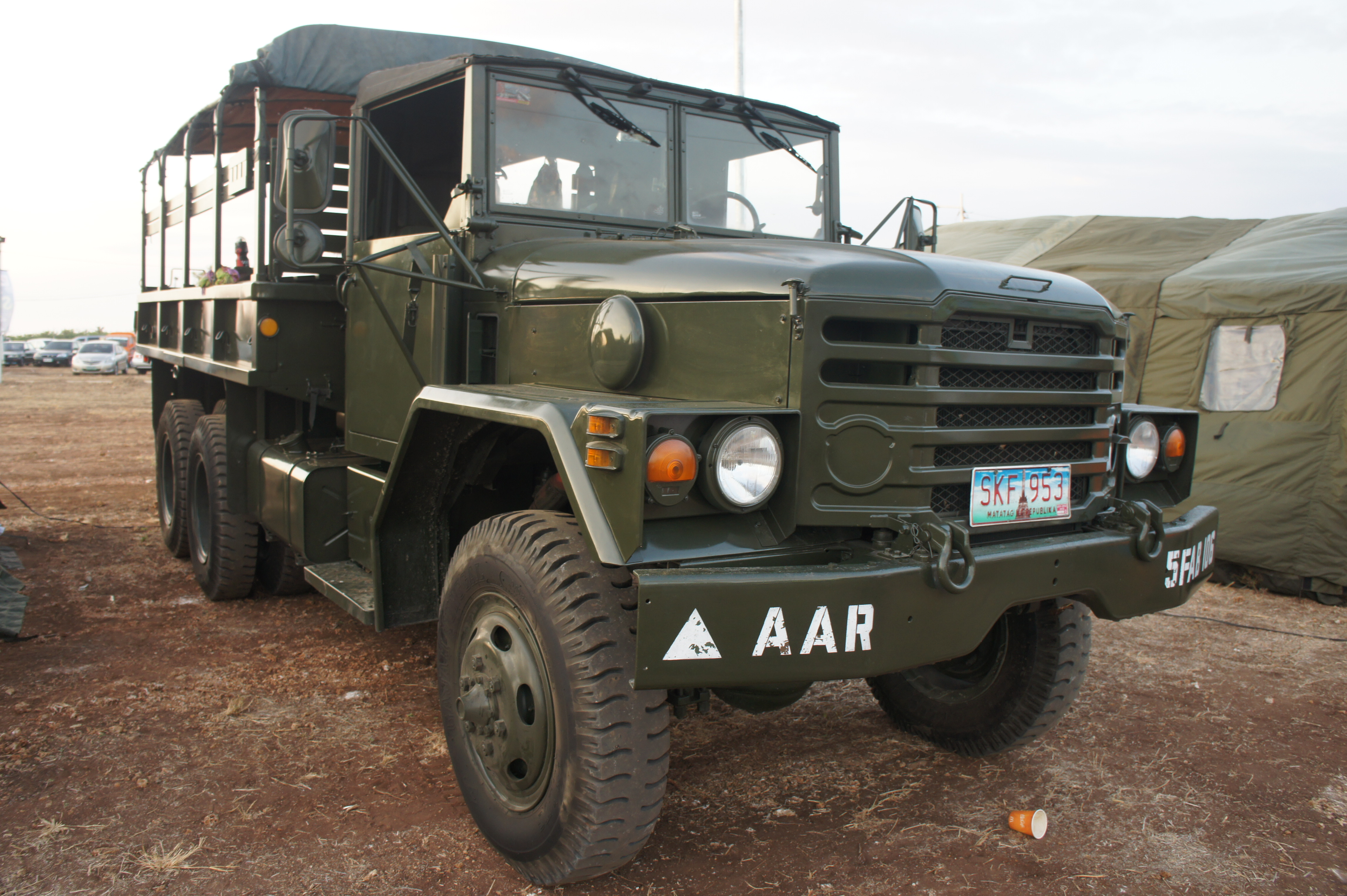
KM250 of the Philippine Army.

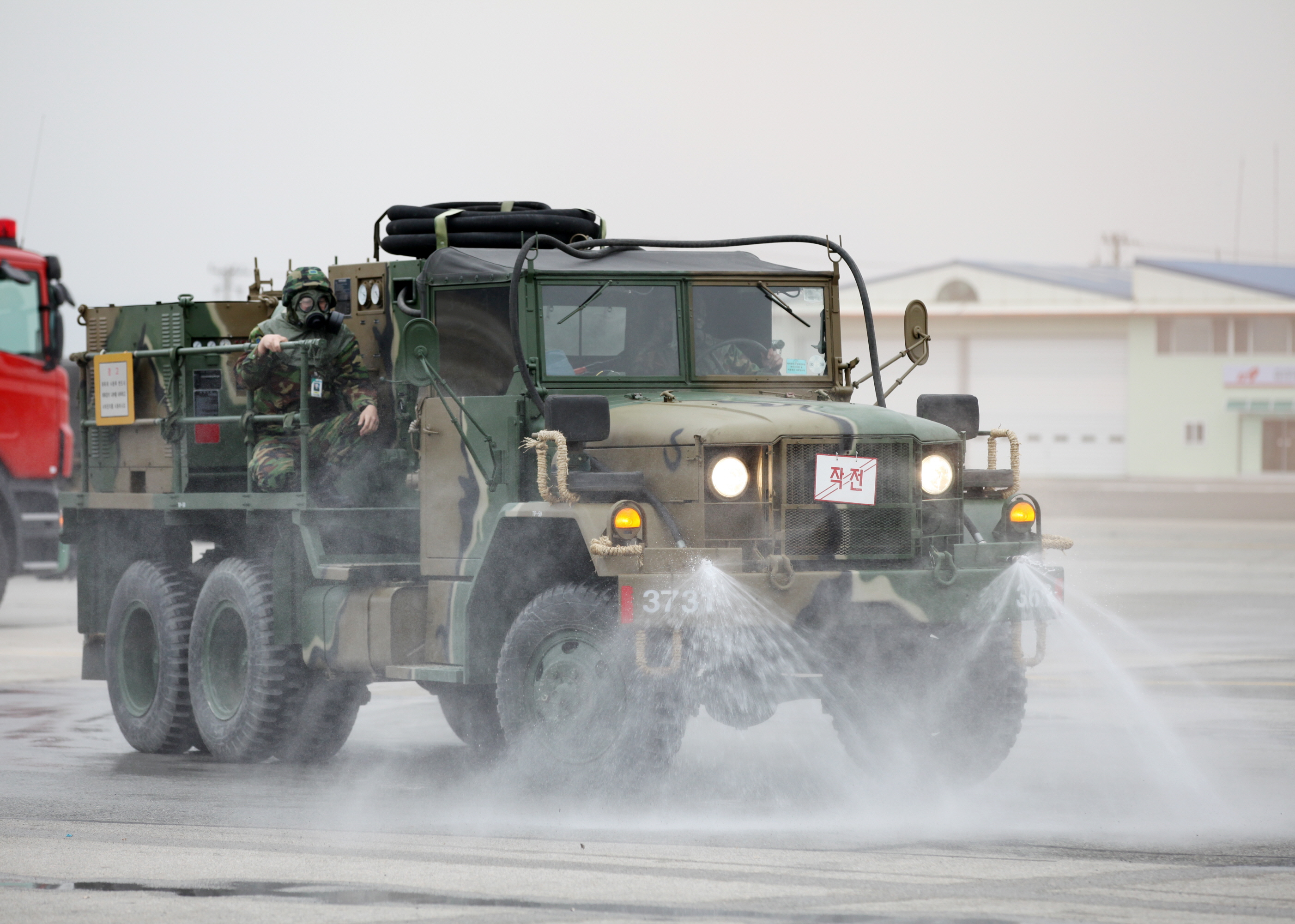
KM259 of the Republic of Korea Air Force.

- KM250 (K511) - Cargo truck.
- KM251 (K517) - Cargo truck with extended wheelbase.
- KM255 (K513) - Fuel tanker, capable of carrying up to 4,540 liters of fuel.
- KM256 (K515) - Water tanker, capable of carrying up to 3,800 liters of water.
- KM258 (K512) - Shop van. It has various tools and spacious work area.
- KM259 (KM9) - Decontamination truck.
- (K516) - Surveillance / Decoding's shop van.
- (K5XX) - Water purification.

== Operators ==
Chile

- Chilean Marine Corps

Cambodia

- Royal Cambodian Army

Iraq

- Iraqi Army

Indonesia

- Indonesian Army

South Korea

- Republic of Korea Air Force
- Republic of Korea Army

Philippines

- Philippine Air Force
- Philippine Army
- Philippine Marine Corps

Thailand

- Royal Thai Army

Yemen

- Yemeni Army
