= FAMAE SAF =

Chilean submachine gun

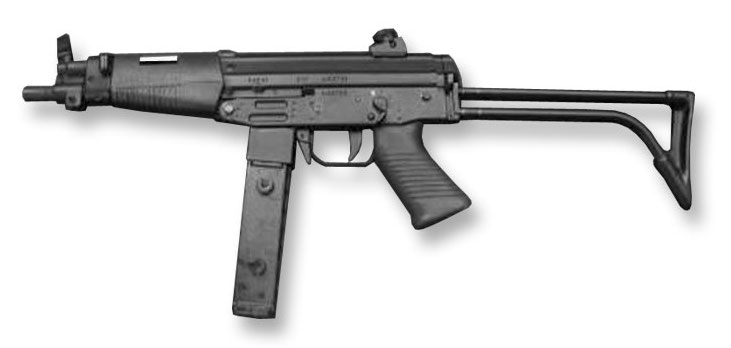
- A left-side view of the FAMAE SAF
- Type: Submachine gun
- Place of origin: Chile

Service history
- Used by: See Users

Production history
- Designer: FAMAE
- Designed: 1993
- Manufacturer: FAMAE
- Produced: 1993–present
- Variants: Mini-SAF

Specifications
- Mass: 2.7 kg (5.95 lb)
- Length: 640 mm (25.2 in) stock extended / 410 mm (16.1 in) stock folded
- Barrel length: 198 mm (7.8 in)
- Cartridge: 9×19mm Parabellum.40 S&W
- Action: Blowback, closed bolt
- Rate of fire: 1,120–1,280 rounds/min
- Effective firing range: 150 m
- Feed system: 20- or 30-round detachable box magazine
- Sights: Iron sights

The FAMAE SAF is a submachine gun produced and manufactured by FAMAE (Fábricas y Maestranzas del Ejército) since 1993.

Since 1999, Taurus have produced the SAF under license in .40 S&W for Brazilian law enforcement.

Semi-automatic-only variants manufactured by FAMAE are mostly marketed for sale in Canada.

== Design ==
The SAF is a blowback-operated select-fire submachine gun, firing from a closed bolt. It is based on the Swiss SIG SG 540 assault rifle which was produced under license in Chile in the 1980s. The design is a shortened version of the SIG 540 rifle, but the rifle's rotating bolt has been replaced with a simple blowback bolt. The SAF also has a bolt hold-open catch that engages after the final shot. Otherwise, the receiver, stock, fore-end, trigger/hammer assembly and floating firing pin design are from the SIG 540. (It also retains the folding trigger guard for winter glove use.)

The upper and lower receiver as well as the trigger guard are steel, and the pistol-grip and handguards are all made from polymer. The ambidextrous safety/fire selector switch, as well as the interchangeability with SIG 552/553 handguards are a feature found on the latest versions. Older versions used their own handguards.

The magazines for 9mm ammunition is built with transparent polymer, allowing the number of available rounds to be determined visually. The magazine is fitted with protruding lugs on one side and corresponding slots on the other, allowing two or three magazines to be clipped together for a quicker magazine change. The .40 S&W magazines are made of steel and hold 30 rounds.

The selector has four settings: safe, single shot, 3-round burst and fully automatic. Some models were made in a semi-auto only configuration for law enforcement and civilian customers.

== Variants ==
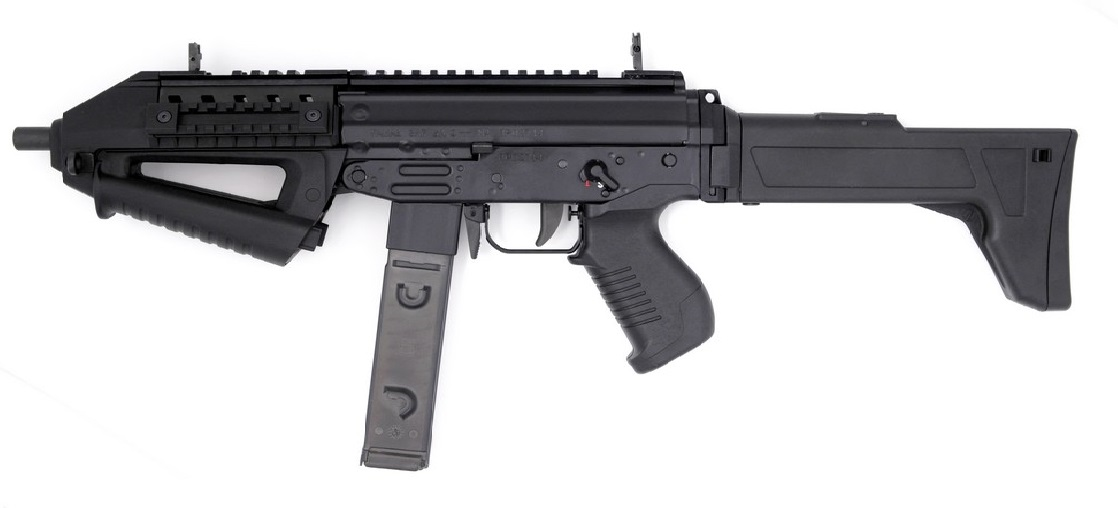
The FAMAE SAF-200 with an unloaded magazine.

The SAF is manufactured in four different variants: standard configuration with a fixed polymer buttstock, standard configuration with a left-side-folding tubular metal buttstock, SAF SD, which used an integral suppressor and folding buttstock, and the Mini-SAF.

The SAF SD is a suppressed variant with a slightly longer barrel length of 220 millimetres (8.7 in). It has a lowered fire rate of 980 rpm and a muzzle velocity of 300m/s.

The Mini-SAF is a more compact variant, at only 12 inches (300 mm) long. It has a short 4.5-inch (110 mm) barrel, no shoulder stock (although the left-side-folding tubular metal buttstock of the standard SAF can be attached), and a vertical foregrip. The Mini-SAF can use the standard 30-round magazines, but comes with special 20-round magazines for a smaller profile. All versions have post-front-sights with adjustable elevation, and aperture-rear-sights, adjustable for windage.

The SAF-200 is a modernised variant, which is being tested by FAMAE and the Chilean Army. It includes a new retractable and foldable stock, a new handguard and Picatinny rails provided for modern optics and lateral attachments. The rails are optional for the other SAF variants, but is standard on the SAF-200.

== Users ==
- Argentina: In service Airport Security Police and Mendoza Provincial Police.
- Brazil: In service Federal Highway Police and Military Police of São Paulo State.
- Chile: In service with the Chilean Armed Forces and police.
- El Salvador: Service in The National Civilian Police.
- Portugal: Was used by the National Republican Guard.
